= List of Commissioners' churches in London =

A Commissioners' church is an Anglican church in the United Kingdom built with money voted by Parliament as a result of the Church Building Act 1818, and subsequent related Acts. Such churches have been given a number of titles, including "Commissioners' Churches", "Waterloo Churches" and "Million Act Churches". In some cases the Commissioners provided the full cost of the new church; in other cases they provided a grant and the balance was raised locally. This list contains the Commissioners' churches in London.

== Key ==
Grade	Criteria
I	Buildings of exceptional interest, sometimes considered to be internationally important.
II*	Particularly important buildings of more than special interest.
II	Buildings of national importance and special interest.
"—" denotes a work that is not graded.

== Churches ==
Name and location	Photograph	Date	Grant in £	Architect	Notes and refs.	Grade
St Paul's Shadwell, Stepney; 51.5094°N 0.0520°W		1817–21	—	John Walters	Rebuilding of an earlier church, with a tower and spire.	II*
St Philip, Stepney	—	1818–19	3,500	John Walters	Gothic Revival with pinnacles. Demolished.	—
St Philip, Regent Street, Westminster	—	1819–22	2,000	George Repton	Greek Revival with a portico and cupola. Demolished about 1875.	—
St Anne, Wandsworth; 51.4549°N 0.1876°W		1820–22	14,511	Robert Smirke	Neoclassical Ionic with a portico and tower. Chancel added 1896.	II*
St Luke's Church, Chelsea; 51.4897°N 0.1694°W		1820–24	8,333	James Savage	Gothic Revival with a tower and a west arcade.	I
St Mary, Bryanston Square; 51.5198°N 0.1619°W		1821–23	14,955	Robert Smirke	Neoclassical Ionic with a south portico and tower.	I
St James, Hackney West	—	1821–23	17,910	Robert Smirke	Neoclassical Doric with a portico, and cupola. Bombed 1940–41.	—
St Clement's; King Square, Finsbury; 51.5277°N 0.0978°W		1822–23	14,200	Thomas Hardwick	Neoclassical Ionic with a portico and steeple. Altered in 1870. Bombed but restored.	II
St Matthew, Brixton; 51.4597°N 0.1160°W		1822–24	7,917	Charles Porden	Neoclassical Doric with a west portico and an east tower. Restored.	II*
St George, Camberwell; 51.4817°N 0.0851°W		1822–24	5,000	Francis Octavius Bedford	Neoclassical Doric with a portico and tower. Altered in 1893 and 1909; closed in 1970. Now in residential use.	II
St Mark, Kennington; 51.4814°N 0.1120°W		1822–24	7,651	David Roper and A. B. Clayton	Neoclassical Doric with a portico and steeple. Bombed but restored in 1949.	II*
All Souls, Langham Place, Marylebone; 51.5180°N 0.1432°W		1822–24	12,819	John Nash	Greek Revival with a portico and spire. Restored in the 1950s.	I
Christ Church, Cosway Street, Marylebone; 51.5216°N 0.1665°W		1822–24	13,804	Thomas Hardwick	Neoclassical Ionic with a portico and tower. Redundant.	II*
St Mary, Greenwich	—	1823–24	11,285	George Basevi	Neoclassical Ionic with a portico and tower. Demolished in 1935.	—
Holy Trinity, Newington; 51.4985°N 0.0939°W		1823–24	8,960	Francis Octavius Bedford	Neoclassical Corinthian with a north portico and a tower. Converted 1975 into a concert hall.	II
St Peter, Walworth; 51.4866°N 0.0926°W		1823–24	9,354	John Soane	Greek Revival with a tower.	I
St John, Waterloo; 51.5045°N 0.1121°W		1823–24	9,976	Francis Octavius Bedford	Neoclassical Doric with a portico, tower and spire. Bombed but restored.	II*
St George (Hanover Chapel), Regent Street, Westminster		1823–24	5,556	Charles Robert Cockerell	Neoclassical Ionic with a portico and two west towers. Demolished in 1896.	—
St Luke, West Norwood; 51.4323°N 0.1035°W		1823–25	6,449	Francis Octavius Bedford	Neoclassical Corinthian with a portico and steeple. Altered 1870.	II*
St John the Baptist, Hoxton; 51.5305°N 0.0836°W		1824–26	16,444	Francis Edwards	Neoclassical Ionic with a tower.	II*
St Peter, Eaton Square, Belgravia; 51.4979°N 0.1493°W		1824–27	5,556	Henry Hakewill	Neoclassical Ionic with a portico and tower.	II*
St Mark, Clerkenwell; 51.5301°N 0.1088°W		1825–27	15,893	William Chadwell Mylne	Gothic Revival with a tower.	II
St Mary, Haggerston		1825–27	15,803	John Nash	Gothic Revival with a tower. Bombed 1940–41.	—
St Mark, North Audley Street, Westminster; 51.5131°N 0.1532°W		1825–27	5,556	J. P. Gandy-Deering	Neoclassical Ionic with a portico and turrets. Altered in 1878 and 2005.	I
Holy Trinity, Marylebone; 51.5245°N 0.1437°W		1826–27	19,041	Sir John Soane	Greek Revival with a tower. Chancel added 1878. Internal reconstruction 1956.	II*
St John, Bethnal Green; 51.5276°N 0.0550°W		1826–28	18,226	John Soane	Greek Revival with a tower. Damaged by fire in 1870; additions made in 1888.	I
Holy Trinity, Islington; 51.5374°N 0.1082°W		1826–28	9,231	Charles Barry	Restored.	II
St John, Islington; 51.5638°N 0.1303°W		1826–28	9,958	Charles Barry	Gothic Revival with a west tower in brick.	II*
St Paul, Islington; 51.5465°N 0.0878°W		1826–28	8,654	Charles Barry	Gothic Revival with an east tower in brick. Converted in 2004.	II*
Holy Trinity, Brompton; 51.4978°N 0.1700°W		1826–29	7,407	Thomas Leverton Donaldson	Gothic Revival with a tower. Chancel added in 1878.	II
St Bartholomew, Sydenham; 51.4279°N 0.0581°W		1826–31	9,325	Lewis Vulliamy	Gothic Revival with a tower. Chancel 1857; further additions in 1883.	II*
St George, Battersea	—	1827–28	3,111	Edward Blore	Gothic Revival with a bell turret. Demolished.	—
St James, Croydon; 51.3816°N 0.0950°W		1827–28	1,474	Robert Wallace	Gothic Revival with a belfry. Chancel added 1881.	II*
St Mary the Less, Lambeth	—	1827–28	5,801	Francis Octavius Bedford	Gothic Revival with a bell turret and spire. Demolished about 1960.	—
St John, Walham Green; 51.4812°N 0.1988°W		1827–28	6,957	George Ledwell Taylor	Gothic Revival with a west tower and lancet windows.	II
St Paul, Winchmore Hill; 51.6354°N 0.1059°W		1827–28	3,250	John Davies	Gothic Revival with a bell turret. Chancel added in 1873.	II
St James, Bermondsey; 51.4970°N 0.0668°W		1827–29	17,666	James Savage	Greek Revival with a tower.	II*
All Saints, Beulah Hill, Croydon; 51.4111°N 0.0869°W		1827–29	5,026	James Savage	Gothic Revival in brick with four turrets. Chancel added in 1861.	II
St Peter, Hammersmith; 51.4914°N 0.2420°W		1827–29	9,099	Edward Lapidge	Neoclassical Doric with a west tower.	II*
St Barnabas, Kensington; 51.4991°N 0.2064°W		1827–29	7,983	Lewis Vulliamy	Gothic Revival with corner turrets. Additions in 1861 and 1909.	II
Holy Trinity, Chelsea	—	1828–29	6,729	James Savage	Gothic Revival with two west towers and a spire. Demolished 1890.	—
Holy Trinity, Hounslow	—	1828–29	3,730	Henry Mawley	Gothic Revival with turrets and dwarf spires. Enlarged 1857; damaged by fire 1943; replaced 1961.	—
St Mary, Plaistow, Newham	—	1828–29	3,100	Edward Blore	Gothic Revival with turrets and a belfry. Replaced in 1889–94.	—
Holy Trinity, Tottenham Green; 51.5883°N 0.0715°W		1828–29	3,205	James Savage	Gothic Revival with two east and two west turrets.	II
All Saints, Skinner Street, City of London	—	1828–30	10,686	Michael Meredith	Gothic Revival style. Demolished about 1869.	—
Holy Trinity, Camden	—	1829–31	8,521	Francis Octavius Bedford	Gothic Revival with a turret and spire. Replaced 1910.	—
St John the Baptist, Hampton Wick; 51.4118°N 0.3128°W	—	1829–31	4,558	Edward Lapidge	Gothic Revival with a bell turret. Chancel added 1888.	—
St Mary, Ilford; 51.5616°N 0.0878°E	—	1829–31	3,117	James Savage	Gothic Revival with a tower. Chancel added 1920.	—
St John, Richmond; 51.4642°N 0.3004°W		1829–31	3,133	Lewis Vulliamy	Gothic Revival with a cupola. Chancel added 1904–05.	II
St James, Enfield Highway; 51.6559°N 0.0471°W		1830	2,146	William Conrad Lochner	Gothic Revival style. Chancel added 1864.	II
St John the Evangelist, Hyde Park		1830–31	6,275	Charles Fowler	Gothic Revival with a belfry. Altered 1888.	II
St Michael, Highgate; 51.5689°N 0.1503°W		1830–32	4,811	Lewis Vulliamy	Gothic Revival with a tower and a spire. Chancel added 1881.	II*
St Peter, Saffron Hill, Camden Town	—	1830–32	16,219	Charles Barry	Gothic Revival with two west turrets. Demolished 1955.	—
Christ Church, Woburn Square, Bloomsbury	—	1831–32	5,097	Lewis Vulliamy	Gothic Revival with a tower and a spire. Demolished.	—
St Philip, Clerkenwell	—	1831–32	4,893	Edward Buckton Lamb	Gothic Revival with a belfry. Demolished.	—
St John the Evangelist, Stratford, Newham; 51.5418°N 0.0030°E		1832–33	6,200	Edward Blore	Gothic Revival with a west tower and spire. Chancel added in 1882.	II
St Michael, Burleigh Street, Westminster	—	1832–34	7,478	James Savage	Gothic Revival with a spire and clerestory. Demolished about 1909.	—
Holy Trinity, Woolwich	—	1833	10	John Douglas Hopkins	Georgian Revival, stuccoed with a west tower. Demolished.	—
St Mary the Virgin, Vincent Square, Westminster	—	1835–36	2,898	Edward Blore	Gothic Revival with a steeple. Demolished.	—
Holy Trinity, Gough Square, City of London	—	1837	1,000	John Shaw, Jr.	Gothic Revival with a tower. Demolished 1913.	—
Holy Trinity, Holborn	—	1837–38	6,109	James Pennethorne	Greek Revival with a tower. Demolished.	—
Holy Trinity, Rotherhithe	—	1837–38	1,161	Sampson Kempthorne	Gothic Revival with a tower. Bombed; demolished.	—
St Luke, Berwick Street, Westminster	—	1837–39	2,500	Edward Blore	Gothic Revival with a belfry. Demolished.	—
Holy Trinity, Blackheath	—	1838–39	1,000	James William Wild	Gothic Revival with two eastern turrets and spires. Bombed; demolished.	—
Holy Trinity, Lambeth	—	1838–39	1,000	Edward Blore	Norman Revival style with a tower. Bombed; demolished.	—
All Saints, Rotherhithe	—	c. 1839	949	Sampson Kempthorne	Gothic Revival style. Demolished.	—
Holy Trinity, Barkingside; 51.5895°N 0.0766°E		1839–40	355	Edward Blore	Norman Revival with a belfry. Chancel added in 1875.	II
St Mary Magdalene, Camberwell	—	1839–40	1,000	Robert Palmer Browne	Gothic Revival with a tower and a spire. Bombed; demolished.	—
St Saviour, Chelsea; 51.4976°N 0.1627°W		1839–40	500	George Basevi	Norman Revival style with turrets. Enlarged 1878; chancel added 1890.	II
St James, Clapton; 51.5574°N 0.0563°W		c. 1840	912	Edward Charles Hakewill	Gothic Revival style. Chancel added 1902.	II
St Philip, Dalston	—	c. 1840	1,000	Henry Duesbury	Gothic Revival style. Demolished.	—
St Andrew, Bethnal Green	—	1840–41	500	Thomas Henry Wyatt and Brandon	Lombard style with a northeast tower. Demolished 1960.	—
St Peter, Bethnal Green; 51.5302°N 0.0646°W		1840–41	500	Lewis Vulliamy	Norman Revival style with a west steeple; in flint.	II
St Michael, Stockwell; 51.4718°N 0.1172°W		1840–41	1,200	William Rogers	Gothic Revival with an east tower and spire. Since restored.	II
Christ Church, Streatham; 51.4445°N 0.1216°W		1840–41	300	James William Wild	Byzantine Revival with a southwest campanile. Bombed; restored.	I
St Paul, Wilton Place, Westminster; 51.5014°N 0.1558°W		1840–41	1,000	Thomas Cundy (junior)	Gothic Revival with a tower. Altered in 1870 and 1891.	II*
St James-the-Less, Bethnal Green; 51.5318°N 0.0479°W		1840–42	500	Lewis Vulliamy	Norman Revival style. Bombed 1940; restored 1961.	II
St Thomas, Noak Hill, Havering; 51.6237°N 0.2247°E	—	1841	150	George Smith	Tudor Revival style with a tower, spire and transepts.	II
St Peter, Norbiton, Kingston upon Thames; 51.4109°N 0.2914°W		1841	500	George Gilbert Scott and Moffatt	Norman Revival style. Chancel added 1866.	II
St Philip, Bethnal Green	—	1841–42	500	Thomas Larkins Walker	Norman Revival style with two west towers in brick. Converted.	—
Emmanuel, Camberwell	—	1841–42	992	Thomas Bellamy	Norman Revival with two stunted west towers. Demolished about 1957.	—
St Mary Magdalene, Southwark	—	1841–42	1,696	Benjamin Ferrey	Gothic Revival with a turret and transepts.	—
St James, Sussex Gardens, Paddington; 51.5131°N 0.1763°W		1841–43	2,000	John Goldicutt and George Gutch	Gothic Revival with a tower and spire. Rebuilt in 1881, incorporating the chancel as a chapel.	II*
Christ Church, Turnham Green; 51.4921°N 0.2651°W		1841–43	500	George Gilbert Scott and Moffatt	Gothic Revival style. Chancel added 1889.	II
St Batholomew, Bethnal Green	—	1842–43	800	William Railton	Gothic Revival style. Converted into flats 1983.	—
Christ Church, Broadway, Westminster	—	1842–43	1,441	Ambrose Poynter	Gothic Revival style. Demolished 1954.	—
St Jude, Chelsea	—	1842–44	500	George Basevi	Gothic Revival with southwest tower. Demolished 1934.	—
St Paul, Herne Hill; 51.4548°N 0.0993°W		1843–44	700	George Alexander	Gothic Revival with a west tower and spire. Rebuilt after a fire in 1858.	II*
St John the Evangelist, Kensal Green; 51.5280°N 0.2153°W		1843–44	500	Henry Kendall	Norman Revival with two west towers. Chancel added later.	II
Christ Church, Camden	—	1844	1,000	Benjamin Ferrey	Gothic Revival with a spire. Demolished about 1931.	—
St James, Kensington; 51.5083°N 0.2132°W		1844–45	500	Lewis Vulliamy	Gothic Revival with a tower. Chancel added 1876.	II
All Saints, Lambeth	—	1844–45	6,513	William Rogers	Norman Revival style with a tower. Demolished about 1899.	—
Holy Trinity, Paddington	—	1844–46	1,000	Thomas Cundy (junior)	Gothic Revival with a tower and spire. Demolished.	—
St John the Evangelist, St Pancras	—	c. 1845	300	Hugh Smith	Romanesque Revival style with a southwest tower. Bombed; demolished.	—
St Jude, Bethnal Green	—	1845–46	500	Henry Clutton	Lombard style with a transeptal towers. Bombed; demolished.	—
St Jude, Whitechapel	—	1845–46	2,103	Frederick John Francis	Gothic Revival with a southwest tower. Demolished 1927.	—
St John, Woolwich; 51.5027°N 0.0429°E	—	1845–46	2,012	Francis E. H. Fowler	Gothic Revival style. Restored 1912.	—
St Barnabas, Homerton; 51.5489°N 0.0426°W		1845–47	1,050	Arthur Ashpitel	Gothic Revival with a west tower. Bombed; restored 1956.	II
St John of Jerusalem, South Hackney; 51.5404°N 0.0461°W		1845–47	1,000	Edward Charles Hakewill	Gothic Revival with a west steeple and transepts.	II*
St Andrew, Marylebone	—	1846	800	Samuel Daukes	Gothic Revival with a tower and spire. Re-erected at Kingsbury 1933.	—
St Simon Zelotes, Bethnal Green	—	c. 1846	500	Benjamin Ferrey	Gothic Revival with a bellcote. Demolished.	—
St Matthias, Bethnal Green	—	1846–47	1,200	Thomas Henry Wyatt	Italianate with a southwest tower and spire. Demolished 1957.	—
All Saints, Paddington	—	1846–47	100	Henry Clutton	Gothic Revival with a bell turret. Burnt down 1895.	—
St Paul, Bermondsey	—	1846–48	400	Samuel Sanders Teulon	Gothic Revival style. Chancel added 1901. Demolished.	—
Christ Church, Bermondsey	—	1847–48	300	William B. Hays	Norman Revival style. Demolished.	—
Christ Church, Highbury; 51.5525°N 0.0987°W	—	1847–48	50	Thomas Allom	Gothic Revival with a central octagon. Altered in 1872 and 1911.	—
St Paul, Camden Square, Camden Town	—	1847–49	500	Frederick Ordish and John Johnson	Gothic Revival with a tower and spire. Demolished.	—
Christ Church, Greenwich	—	1847–49	450	John Brown	Gothic Revival with a tower. Bombed; converted.	—
St Stephen, St John's Wood	—	c. 1848	500	Samuel Daukes	Gothic Revival with a southeast tower. Demolished.	—
Christ Church, Battersea	—	1848–49	200	Lee and Thomas Bury	Gothic Revival style. Demolished 1944.	—
All Saints, Ennismore Gardens, Westminster; 51.5006°N 0.1691°W		1848–49	2,000	Lewis Vulliamy	Italian Romanesque Revival with a tower. From 1955 Russian Orthodox Cathedral.	II*
St James, Edmonton	—	1849	100	Edward Ellis	Gothic Revival style. Redundant.	—
St Barnabas, Lambeth	—	c. 1849	200	Joseph Clarke and James Humphreys	Gothic Revival style.	—
St Paul, Rotherhithe	—	c. 1849	150	William Beatson	Demolished.	—
Holy Trinity, Camden Town; 51.5441°N 0.1450°W		1849–50	400	Thomas Henry Wyatt and Brandon	Gothic Revival with a tower and spire.	II
St Thomas, Charlton; 51.4887°N 0.0466°E		1849–50	500	Joseph Gwilt	Norman Revival style. Apse added 1893.	II
St Mary, The Boltons, Kensington; 51.4891°N 0.1842°W		1849–50	85	George Godwin	Gothic Revival with a Greek cross plan. Bombed; restored.	II
St Stephen; Shepherd's Bush; 51.5058°N 0.2290°W		1849–50	370	Anthony Salvin	Gothic Revival with a tower.	II
St Matthew, Great Peter Street, Westminster; 51.4970°N 0.1309°W		1849–50	2,000	George Gilbert Scott	Gothic Revival style. Restored 1984 after a fire.	II
St Peter, Croydon; 51.3634°N 0.0955°W		1849–51	250	George Gilbert Scott	Gothic Revival with a tower and spire.	II
Holy Trinity, Bessborough Gardens, Westminster; 51.4887°N 0.1306°W	—	1849–52	10	John Loughborough Pearson	Gothic Revival style. Demolished 1954.	—
St Saviour, Hampstead; 51.5449°N 0.1580°W		1849–56	5	Edward Middleton Barry	Gothic Revival style.	II
St Matthew, Islington	—	c. 1850	50	Alexander Dick Gough	Gothic Revival style. Bombed; demolished.	—
Emmanuel, Forest Gate; 51.5462°N 0.0262°E		1850–51	125	George Gilbert Scott	Gothic Revival style.	II
Christ Church, Broad Green, Croydon	—	1851	3,000	Samuel Sanders Teulon	Gothic Revival with transepts. Chancel enlarged in 1860.	—
Christ Church, Stratford Marsh	—	1851	350	John Johnson	Gothic Revival with a tower. Replaced about 1974.	—
St Mark, Camden Town; 51.5379°N 0.1523°W		1851–53	250	Thomas Little	Gothic Revival with a tower and spire. Enlarged 1890; restored 1957.	II
St Matthias, Stoke Newington; 51.5525°N 0.0795°W		1851–53	250	William Butterfield	Gothic Revival with a central tower. Bombed; restored.	I
Christ Church, Forest Hill; 51.4381°N 0.0484°W		1851–56	140	Ewan Christian	Gothic Revival with a west steeple. Converted into residential accommodation 2004.	II
St Mark, South Norwood, Croydon; 51.3989°N 0.0704°W		1852	100	Thomas Finden and Thomas Lewis	Gothic Revival with a west bell turret. Aisles added in 1864, chancel 1869.	II
St John the Evangelist, Angell Town, Brixton; 51.4675°N 0.1093°W		1852–53	10	Benjamin Ferrey	Gothic Revival with a west tower. North transept added 1876; damaged by fire in 1947 and restored.	II
St John the Evangelist, Limehouse	—	1852–53	400	Henry Clutton	Gothic Revival with a turret. Demolished.	—
St Andrew, Islington; 51.5411°N 0.1153°W		c. 1852–54	350	Francis Newman and John Johnson	Gothic Revival with a southwest tower and transepts.	II
St Mark, Islington; 51.5651°N 0.1158°W		c. 1853	210	Alexander Dick Gough	Gothic Revival style. Aisles added 1884.	II
St James, Hatcham	—	1853–54	400	Walter Granville	Gothic Revival style. Now a dance centre.	—
St Andrew, Ashley Place, Westminster	—	1853–55	2,000	George Gilbert Scott	Gothic Revival with a turret. Demolished about 1955.	—
St John, Blackheath; 51.4758°N 0.0186°E		c. 1854	5	Arthur Ashpitel	Gothic Revival style.	II
St Luke, Marylebone	—	c. 1854	10	Ewan Christian	Gothic Revival with a south tower. Demolished other than the tower.	—
St Jude, Islington; 51.5489°N 0.0805°W		1854–55	250	Alexander Dick Gough	Gothic Revival with south tower and spire. Chancel and clerestory added 1871.	II
Christ Church, Lancaster Gate, Bayswater; 51.5120°N 0.1804°W	—	1854–55	10	Frederick and Horace Francis	Gothic Revival style. Body converted into residential use; tower remains.	II
Christ Church, Lambeth	—	1855	5	Vernon Arnold	Italianate style. Demolished 1899.	—
St Andrew, Lambeth	—	c. 1855	230	Samuel Sanders Teulon	Gothic Revival with northwest steeple. Demolished 1955.	—
St John the Baptist, Isleworth; 51.4721°N 0.3365°W		1855–56	10	James Deason	Gothic Revival style.	II
St Saviour, Warwick Avenue, Paddington	—	c. 1855–56	5	Thomas Little	Gothic Revival style. Chancel added 1883. Demolished.	—
St Stephen's Church, Westbourne Park, Paddington		c. 1855–56	10	Frederick and Horace Francis	Gothic Revival with a tower and spire. Apse added 1900.	II
All Saints, Shoreditch; 51.5391°N 0.0735°W		1856	200	Philip Hardwick	Gothic Revival style.	II

== See also ==
- List of Commissioners' churches in eastern England
- List of Commissioners' churches in the English Midlands
- List of Commissioners' churches in Northeast and Northwest England
- List of Commissioners' churches in southwest England
- List of Commissioners' churches in Wales
- List of Commissioners' churches in Yorkshire
