= Giles Goddard =

British priest

The Reverend Canon Giles Goddard
- Vicar of St John's Church, Waterloo
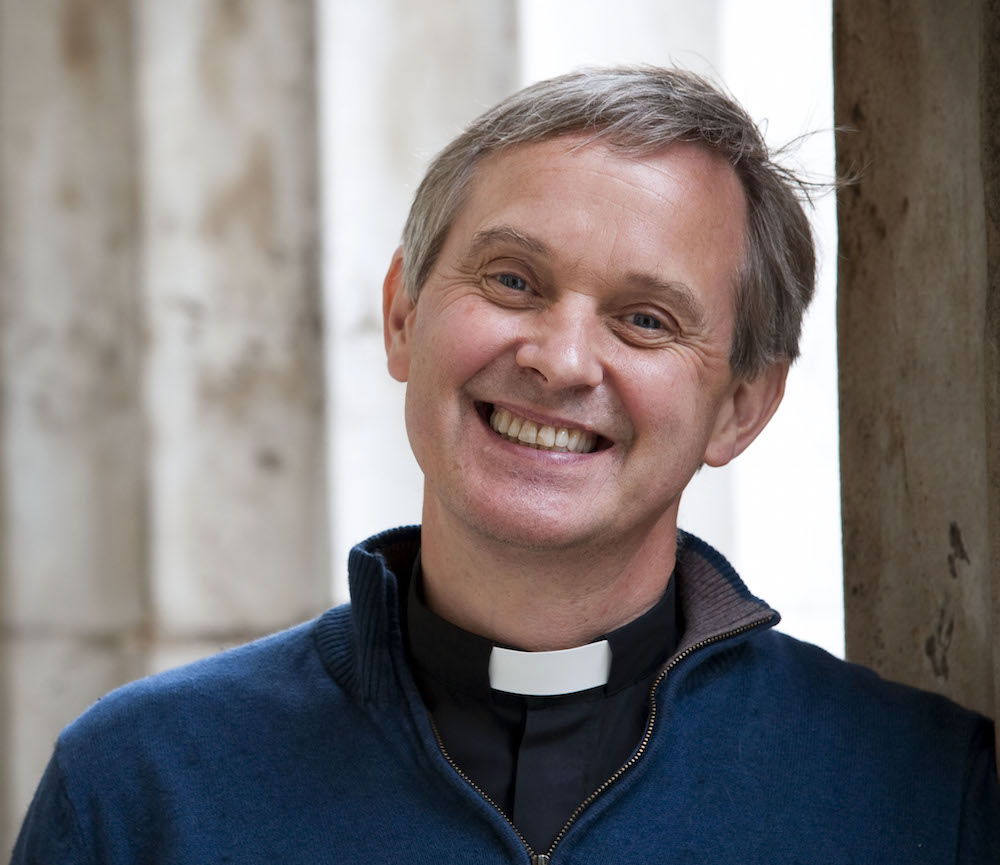
- Goddard in 2006
- Church: Church of England
- Diocese: Diocese of Southwark
- In office: September 2009 to present
- Other posts: Rector of St Peter's Church, Walworth (1998–2009); Area Dean of Southwark and Newington (2003–2008)

Orders
- Ordination: 1995 (deacon); 1996 (priest)

Personal details
- Born: Giles William Goddard; 22 June 1962 (age 64)
- Education: Clare College, Cambridge

Giles William Goddard (born 22 June 1962 in England) is a British Church of England priest. He is Vicar of St John's Church, Waterloo.

== Early life ==
Goddard studied theology at Clare College, Cambridge, and graduated from the University of Cambridge with a Bachelor of Arts (BA) degree in 1984; as per tradition, this was later promoted to a Master of Arts (MA (Cantab)) degree.

He then worked at John Lewis Plc. In 1988 he joined the Housing Corporation, the government agency then responsible for funding social housing. He became development director for ASRA Housing Association in 1989, before joining the newly formed Southwark and London Diocesan Housing Association in 1991 as its founding Director, until he was ordained.

== Ordained ministry ==
Goddard was ordained in the Church of England as a deacon in 1995 and as a priest in 1996. He became Curate at St Faith's, North Dulwich. In 1998 he became Rector of St Peter's Church, Walworth, where in 2003 he set up InSpire, a centre for learning, arts and community. From 2003 - 2008 he was Area Dean of Southwark & Newington. On 1 September 2009, he was officially welcomed as Priest-in-Charge of St John's Church, Waterloo. In 2014, he was made Vicar of the parish.

Goddard is co-founder of Faith for the Climate, the interfaith environmental action group. In 2014, he presented a motion to the General Synod, calling for leadership on the issue of climate change. The Synod voted overwhelmingly in favour of the motion. Goddard said: 'This vote proves that there is a hunger for us to do more on climate change as a church. But this is not the end, it's the beginning.'

A former chair of Inclusive Church, Goddard was a member of the General Synod Human Sexuality Group from 2009 - 2017 and works to ensure full inclusion of LGBT people in the Church of England. He appeared in a Channel 4 documentary that considered the question of gay vicars and as a vicar in a short film called "Getting In". In October 2007, Giles was made an honorary Canon of Southwark Cathedral, along with four other clergy members from the Diocese of Southwark.

Space for Grace - Creating Inclusive Churches, was published by Canterbury Press in 2008. Generous Faith - Creating Vibrant Christian Communities was published by Canterbury Press in 2024. "Exploring Spirit - Finding What Matters in a Broken World" was published by Canterbury Press in 2026.

In March 2015 Goddard was obliged to apologise for inviting Muslims to conduct Muslim prayers in St John's Waterloo an action that caused national controversy.
