= St John's Church, Waterloo =

Coordinates: 51.5045°N 0.112°W

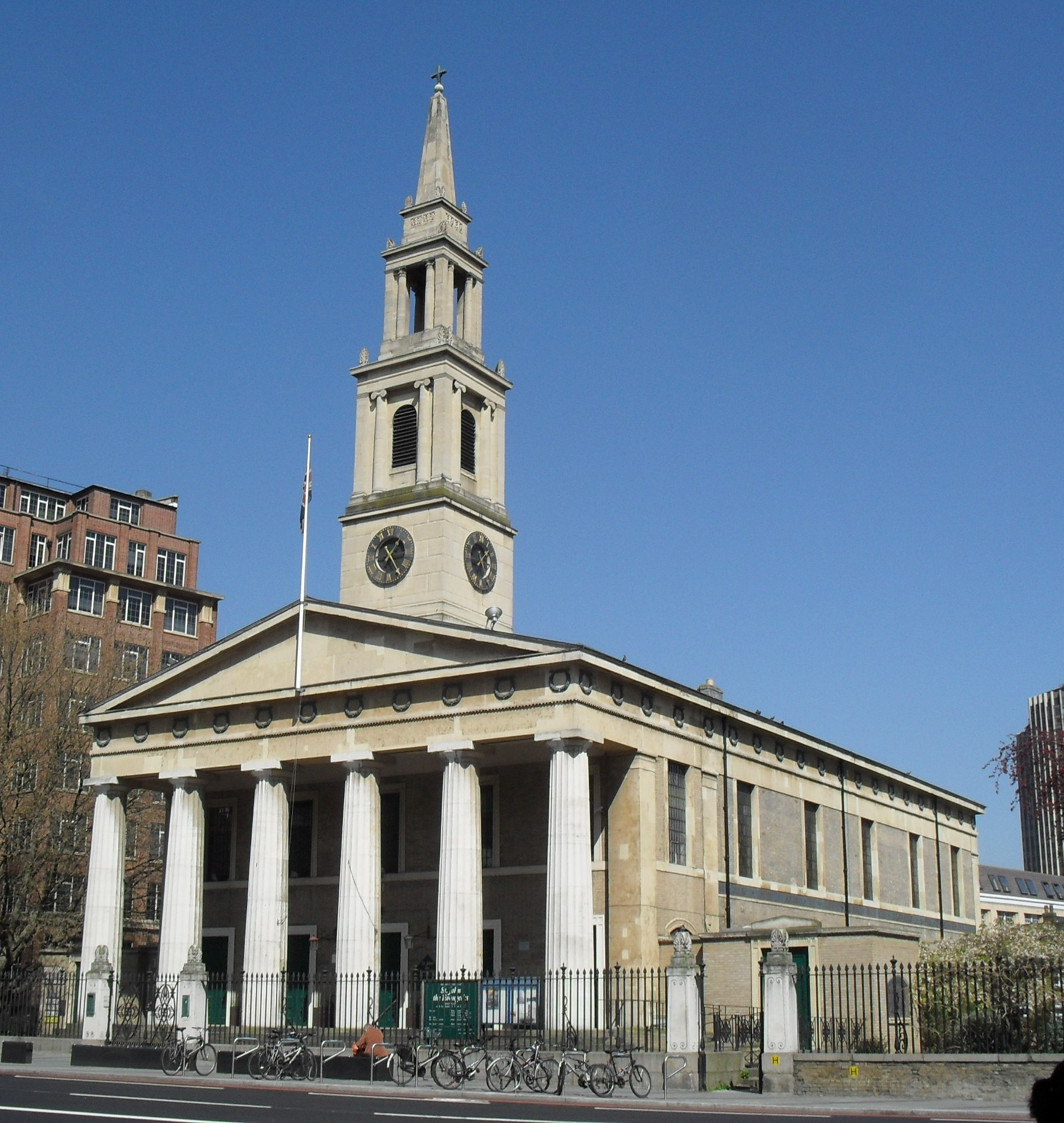
- St John's Church in 2010
- St John's Church, Waterloo
- Location: Waterloo Road, London
- Country: England
- Denomination: Church of England
- Churchmanship: Liberal Catholic
- Website: stjohnswaterloo.org

History
- Status: Active
- Founded: 1822
- Dedication: St John the Evangelist
- Dedicated: 3 November 1824

Architecture
- Functional status: Parish church
- Architect: Francis Bedford
- Years built: 1822–1824

Administration
- Diocese: Diocese of Southwark
- Archdeaconry: Archdeaconry of Lambeth
- Deanery: Lambeth North
- Parish: Waterloo, St. John with St. Andrew

Clergy
- Bishop: The Revd Canon Dr Martin Gainsborough
- Vicar: The Revd Canon Giles Goddard

St John's Church, Waterloo, is an Anglican Greek Revival church in South London, built in 1822–24 to the designs of Francis Octavius Bedford. It is dedicated to St John the Evangelist, and with St Andrew's, Short Street, forms a united benefice.

== Location ==
The church is located in Waterloo, opposite the London IMAX, close to Waterloo station and the Waterloo campus of King's College London. In 1818, when the country was settling down into a period of peace after the Napoleonic Wars and the population was beginning to expand rapidly, Parliament decided to allocate a sum not exceeding a million pounds for the building of additional churches in populous parishes and "more particularly in the Metropolis and its Vicinity." Of this sum, the Commissioners for Building New Churches appropriated £64,000 in 1822 for the needs of the parish of Lambeth. It was decided that a new church should be built on the Waterloo Bridge approach, with a piece of ground on the east side of the road to be purchased from the Archbishop of Canterbury and his lessee and the sub-lessee, Gilbert East and a man named Anderson.

== History ==
The Church of St John was built to the designs of the architect Francis Octavius Bedford in 1824. Bedford designed three other churches for the Commissioners, St George's, Camberwell, St Luke's Church, West Norwood and Holy Trinity, Newington. They were all built in the same Greek style inspired by Bedford's background as a well-respected Greek scholar and antiquarian. Bedford's churches were fiercely criticised by contemporary critics at a time when the tide was turning away from the Greek revival towards Gothic. St John's however gained more critical appreciation mainly because of its fine spire which used classical detail to build up a more traditional English parish church shape.

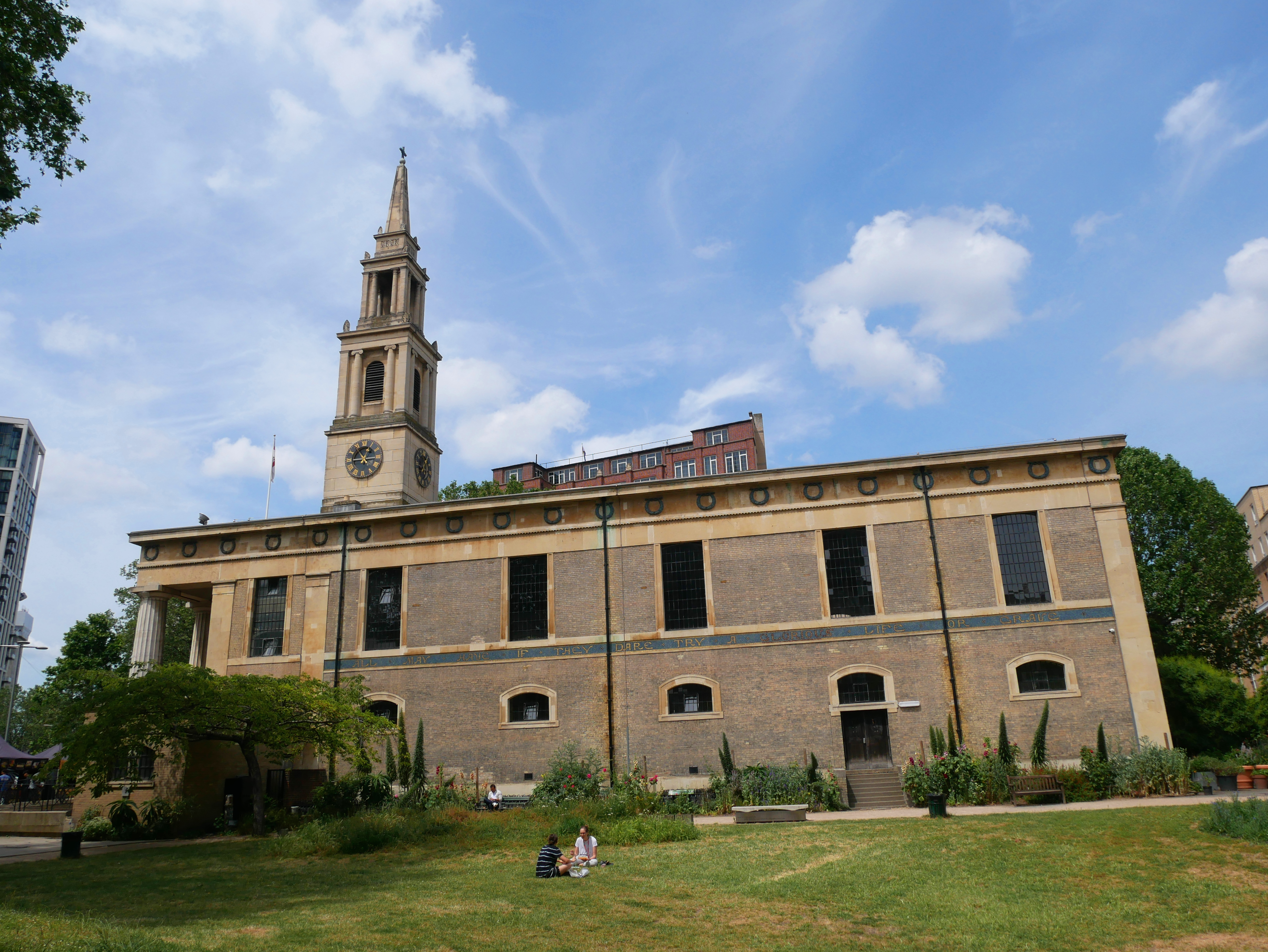
The south face of the Church of Saint John

The ground was very swampy, consisting in part of a pond, and the advice of John Rennie the Younger was sought as to the most suitable type of foundation. His recommendation that piling should be used under all the walls was adopted with such success that, after the lapse of 125 years, heavy damage by bombing and ten years' exposure to the weather, the walls were still strong and sound enough to be used in the renovated church.

The churchyard was converted into a garden in 1877. In 1883 Lord Brabazon, the Chairman of the newly formed Metropolitan Public Gardens Association, gave a swing and giant stride as part of a children's playground; the MPGA itself provided parallel bars, a seesaw and six seats. In more recent years the garden had become neglected, but has since been restored. The playground equipment is no longer present.

The church was renovated by Reginald Blomfield in 1885 and altered internally by Ninian Comper in 1924. The church was struck by a bomb in 1940, when the roof and much of the interior was destroyed. Services were then held in the crypt, and the church described itself as St John's-in-the-crypt. The building stood open for ten years until it was restored and remodelled internally by Thomas Ford in 1950. In 1951 the church was rededicated as the Festival of Britain Church.

Thomas Ford removed the galleries and a new decorative scheme was installed using Greek ornamental motifs, gilt and light pastel shades. A mural by Hans Feibusch was commissioned and replaced the damaged Victorian reredos Two paintings by David Morris depicting Christ in parables in views from Waterloo Bridge were installed in the 1990's to either side of the mural. The overall effect was vastly different from the essentially Victorian interior that previously existed.

The much-modified organ was by Bishop & Sons, dating from the construction of the church in 1824. Badly damaged by the war-time bombing, it was restored in 1951 by Noel Mander. There is a ring of 8 bells, all by Thomas II Mears of the Whitechapel Bell Foundry and all dating from 1825.

During the construction of the Jubilee line, the structural stability of the church was closely monitored as the soil underneath the church began to dry out as a result of the building of the new London Underground line. Still supported by the piles driven into the marshy soil in 1824, millions of gallons of water had to be pumped into the foundations of the church to prevent its collapse as a result.

The church received a 14-month restoration of the nave and crypt in 2021–22, led by Eric Parry Architects. The work included meticulous restoration of the Feibusch mural. It received the Presidents' Award from the National Churches Trust in 2023 and an RIBA Regional Award in 2024.

== Today ==
The church that exists today is a thriving and inclusive multicultural congregation in the Anglican catholic tradition that has strong links with the local community. Every June it hosts the popular Waterloo Festival. It is also home to The Bridge at Waterloo and a large and thriving Churchyard garden. It has a strong commitment to justice and environmental work and won an EcoChurch Gold award in 2022.

There is a choir under a musical director. The church also hosts the Okusinza Church, which is a Luganda language church with a mainly Ugandan congregation. The church has Food Court stalls outside selling a range of cuisines from Monday – Friday every week.

== List of vicars ==
- 1824–1832: Jonathan Tyers Barrett
- 1832–1848†: Robert Irvine (curate since 1828)
- 1848–1871†: James Aitken Johnston (curate 1847–48)
- 1871–1874†: Hugh Wilson Bateman
- 1874–1880: Arthur J. Robinson
- 1881–1893: Arthur W. Jephson
- 1893–1895: Arthur H. Powell
- 1895–1902: Francis Bainbridge-Bell
- 1902: Edward Gordon
- 1921: John Woodhouse
- 1925: Charles Hutchinson
- 1944: Edwin Rhys
- 1972: John Ford
- 1976: David Jack Wickert AKC
- 1987: Robert J. Yeomans AKC
- 1994: Richard Truss
- 2009: Giles Goddard

† Vicar died in post
