= Inclusive Church =

British Christian movement founded in 2003

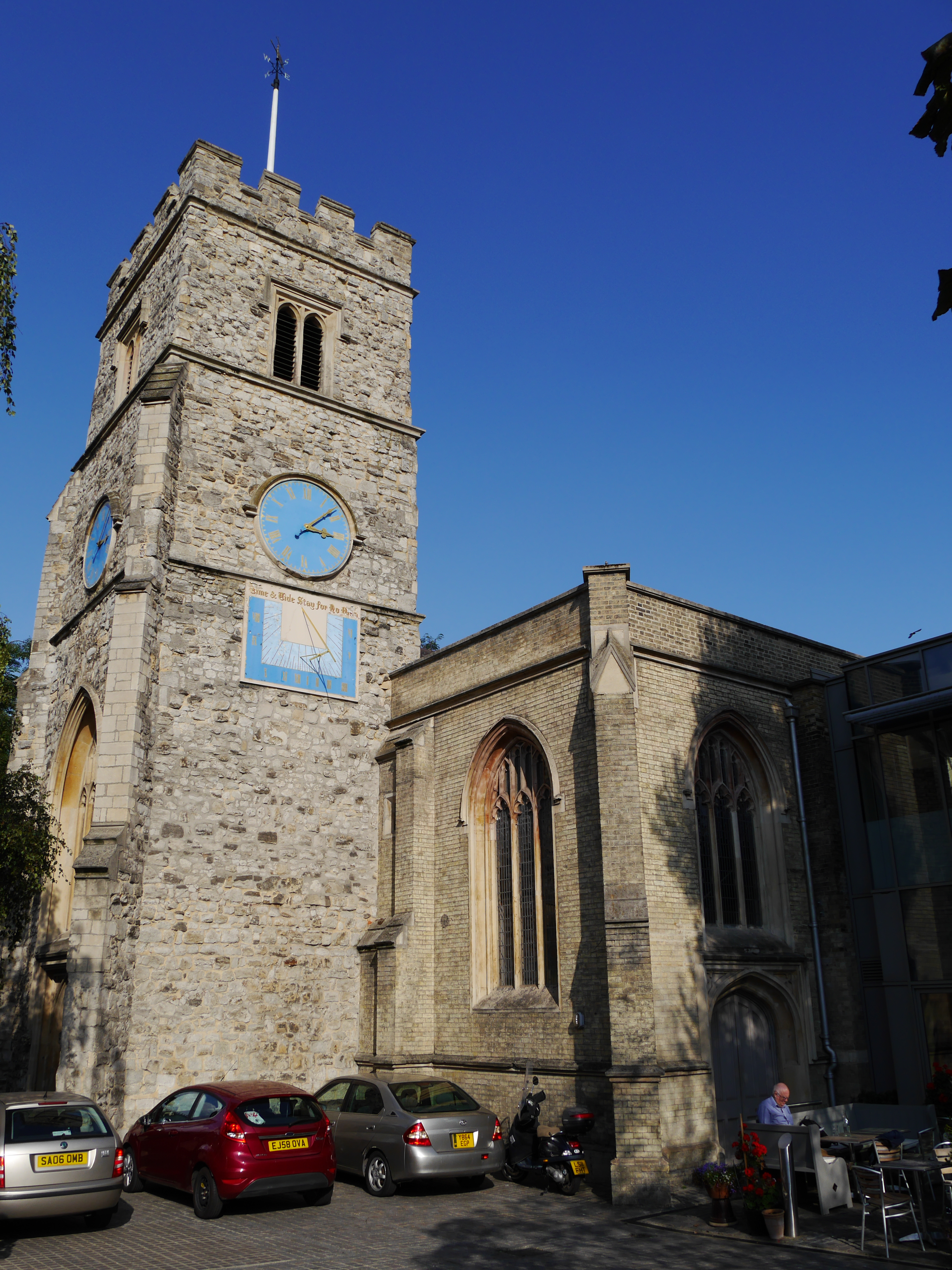
The meeting that led to the creation of Inclusive Church was held at St Mary's, Putney, in 2003.

Inclusive Church is an organisation founded in 2003 that advocates for the full inclusion of all people regardless of disability, economic power, ethnicity, gender, gender identity, learning disability, mental health, neurodiversity, and sexual orientation, in the Christian churches (especially the Church of England), including in the threefold order of bishops, priests and deacons. More broadly, it seeks "to raise awareness about the ways that people feel excluded by the church".

== Founding and organisation ==
Inclusive Church was founded in 2003, following the resignation of Jeffrey John, a celibate gay priest, as Bishop-designate of Reading, following controversy over his homosexuality. It was also founded as a response to the Church of England's then-rejection of women as bishops. The organisation's petition against John's resignation achieved nearly 10,000 signatures. Its first chair (until 2005) was Giles Fraser, then vicar of St Mary's, Putney and later Canon Chancellor of St Paul's Cathedral; later chairs have been Giles Goddard (2005–2012), Dianna Gwilliams (2012–2022), Dan Barnes-Davies (2022–2025) and Allie Kerr (since 2025; also Archdeacon of Bromley & Bexley since 2023).

In the decade after its creation, Inclusive Church's focus broadened away from gender and sexual orientation. The organisation seeks to include all who feel excluded from churches. In 2014–2015, the organisation published a series of books under the title Inclusive Church Resource, dealing with disability, mental health, sexuality, poverty, ethnicity, and gender.

Inclusive Church's national co-ordinator is Chantal Noppen. Its board includes elected independent trustees alongside representatives from other organisations with similar aims, such as Changing Attitude, the Association of Black Clergy, Women and the Church, and Modern Church. Most member churches are part of the Church of England, but there are also member churches from the Methodist Church, the United Reformed Church, independent churches and churches outside the UK.

== Lectures ==
In 2013, Inclusive Church started hosting an annual lecture related to the organisation's goals. The inaugural lecture was given by Martyn Percy, then principal of Ripon College, Cuddesdon, and later Dean of Christ Church, Oxford, and was entitled "Beyond Inclusion: Whose Church Is It Anyway?"

In 2014, the lecture was given by Linda Woodhead, Professor of Sociology of Religion at Lancaster University, and was entitled "Whatever happened to Liberal Christianity?"

== 2015 General Synod campaign ==
In January 2015, Inclusive Church, in partnership with other organisations, began a campaign focused on the General Synod of the Church of England elections taking place later that year. The campaign aimed to "work against discrimination" in the Church of England during the five-year synod term. It was described by the campaign co-ordinator as "an attempt to increase the number of people on General Synod, both lay and clergy, who would take an inclusive line against discrimination on areas of gender, race and sexual orientation".
