= Thomas Ford (architect) =

English architect and translator (1891–1971)

Thomas Francis Ford FRIBA
- Born: 9 May 1891; Bedford, England
- Died: 11 January 1971 (aged 79)
- Education: Bedford Modern School; Royal Institute of British Architects

Thomas Francis Ford FRIBA (9 May 1891 – 11 January 1971) was a prolific ecclesiastical architect, Diocesan Architect for Southwark, an Ashpitel Prize winner at the Royal Institute of British Architects, founder of Thomas Ford Architects, and with his brother Ralph, who owned the largest and most complete collection of English Bibles in England, a translator in 1948 of the New Testament.

== Early years ==
Ford was born in Bedford on 9 May 1891 and educated at Bedford Modern School. In 1908 he moved to London to study architecture and was initially apprenticed to a firm of architects before commencing studies at the Royal Academy School of Architecture in 1912. Ford's studies were interrupted by the advent of World War I during which he was a conscientious objector on account of his religious faith. After the war, Ford resumed his studies and won the acclaimed Ashpitel Prize for top marks in his final Royal Institute of British Architects examinations in 1919.

== Architectural career ==
Ford's architectural career began in the office of W A Forsyth where he was briefly a partner before starting his own architectural practice in 1926, initially concentrating on commercial work. By 1929 the practice was called Ford and Harkess and based at 12 City Road in the City of London. Ford lived at Eltham from 1930 and worked extensively in south east London where he started to specialise in churches and became diocesan architect for Southwark.

Ford was "not known for his love of advanced modern architecture and his churches derive from a number of styles, though many show primarily the influence of Sir John Soane (1753–1837) and other architects of the Regency". After World War II, during which he was head air raid warden, he was engaged in the rebuilding of damaged churches as well as designing new ones. Most of his "post-war buildings are modest", reflecting post-war privation, although he regularly engaged Hans Feibusch to paint murals.

== The New Testament translation ==
In 1948 Ford and his brother, Ralph Ewart Ford, published "a blue-bound, 7 1/2"x 5" New Testament of 377 pages" entitled The Letchworth Version.

Born in Bedford, both brothers had been influenced at an early age by John Bunyan. In their preface to The Letchworth Version of the New Testament, the brothers praise the King James Version and state their aim to be the simplification of its language so that it could be comprehensible to a modern ear and the vast majority of ordinary people, a view they had gained over the years working with the poor and for Ralph, as a scripture reader to the forces during World War II. On 23 June 1945, Thomas Ford "read his paper entitled the 'Need for a Revision of the English Bible' before the Ecclesiological Society in London". Although "they were not experts in Greek, Mr. R. E. Ford owned the largest and most complete collection of English Bibles in England" (the collection was displayed at the Chapter House of Westminster Abbey during the coronation of Queen Elizabeth II in 1953) and thus the brothers were able to compare them all to ensure that they were adhering closely to the meaning.

The Letchworth Version was published in 1948 on a print run of 3,000. Due to "misunderstanding the brothers' aims and the refusal of the university presses to permit the use of the name Authorized Version in the Ford's preface, reviewers criticized the version rigorously and it has not been reprinted".

== Family life ==
In August 1920, Ford married Grace with whom he had two boys and one girl. Ford's two sons and son-in-law were employed in Ford's architectural practice which continues today. Ford's "hobby was bookbinding, at which he excelled, including the intricate gold tooling".

== Selected architectural work ==
- Crawley – Church of St Alban, Gossops Green (1962)
- Eltham – Church of St Barnabas (restored Sir Gilbert Scott's work following war damage in 1944)
- New Eltham – All Saints Church
- Paulsgrove – Church of St Michael and All Angels (1955)
- Storrington – Church of St Mary, where Ford added a vestry south of the chancel in 1933
- Tulse Hill – Church of St Matthias (repairs)
- Walworth - The Church of St Peter Walworth, Liverpool Grove and Trafalgar Street (restoration work completed 1953)
- Waterloo - St John's Church (restored and remodelled after bomb damage)
- Welling – Church of St Mary the Virgin
- Wickham – Church of St Michael
- Woolwich – Church of St Mary Magdalene (repairs)

== Gallery ==
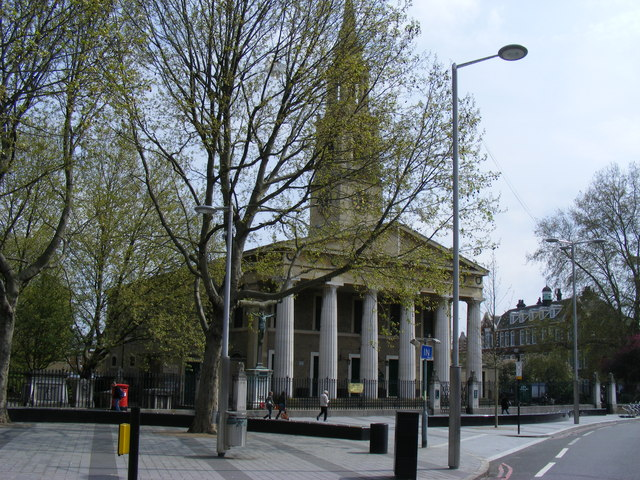
St John's Church, Waterloo, remodelled by Ford after bomb damage

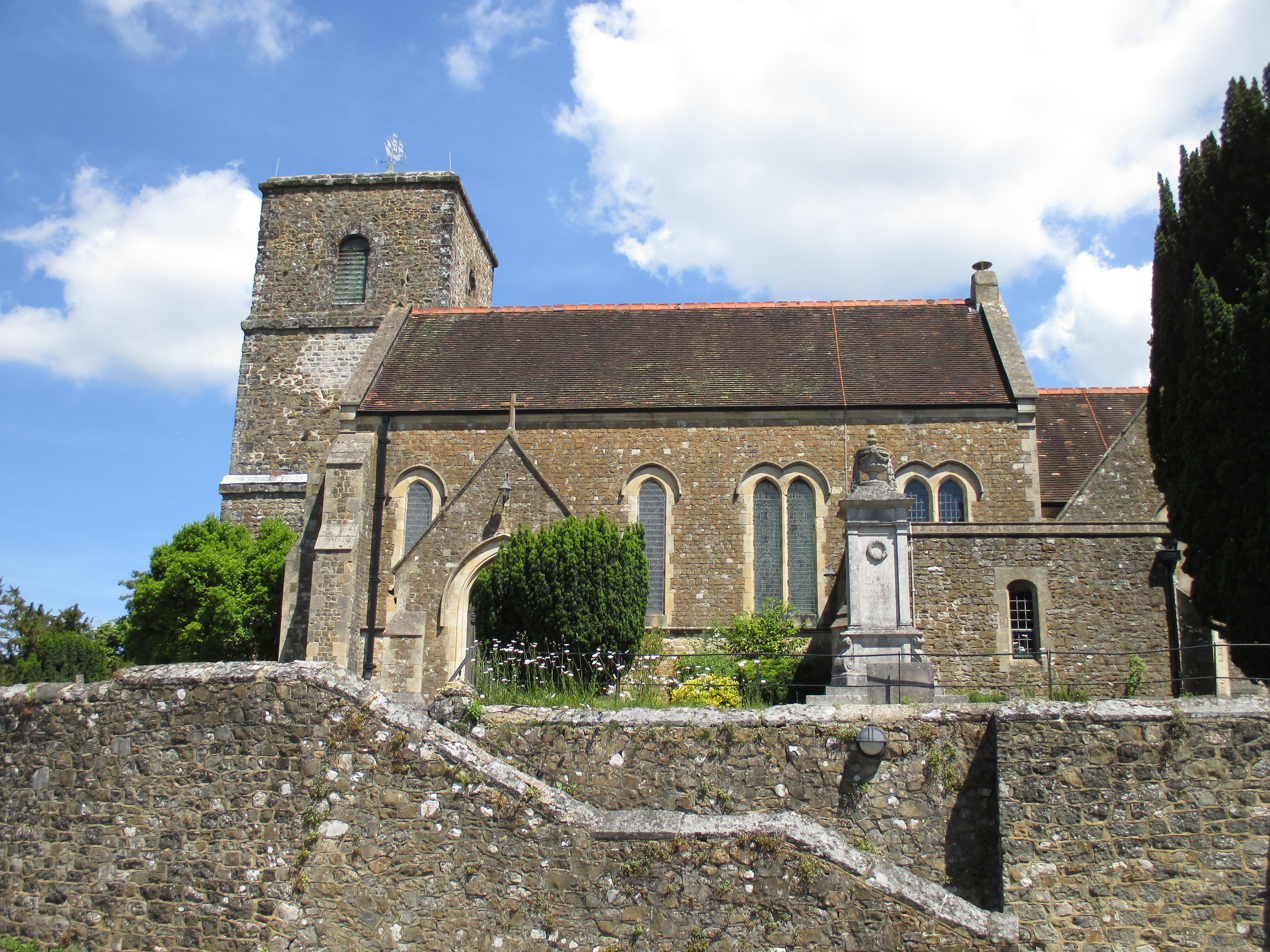
St Mary's Church, Storrington, where Ford added a vestry south of the chancel, 1933

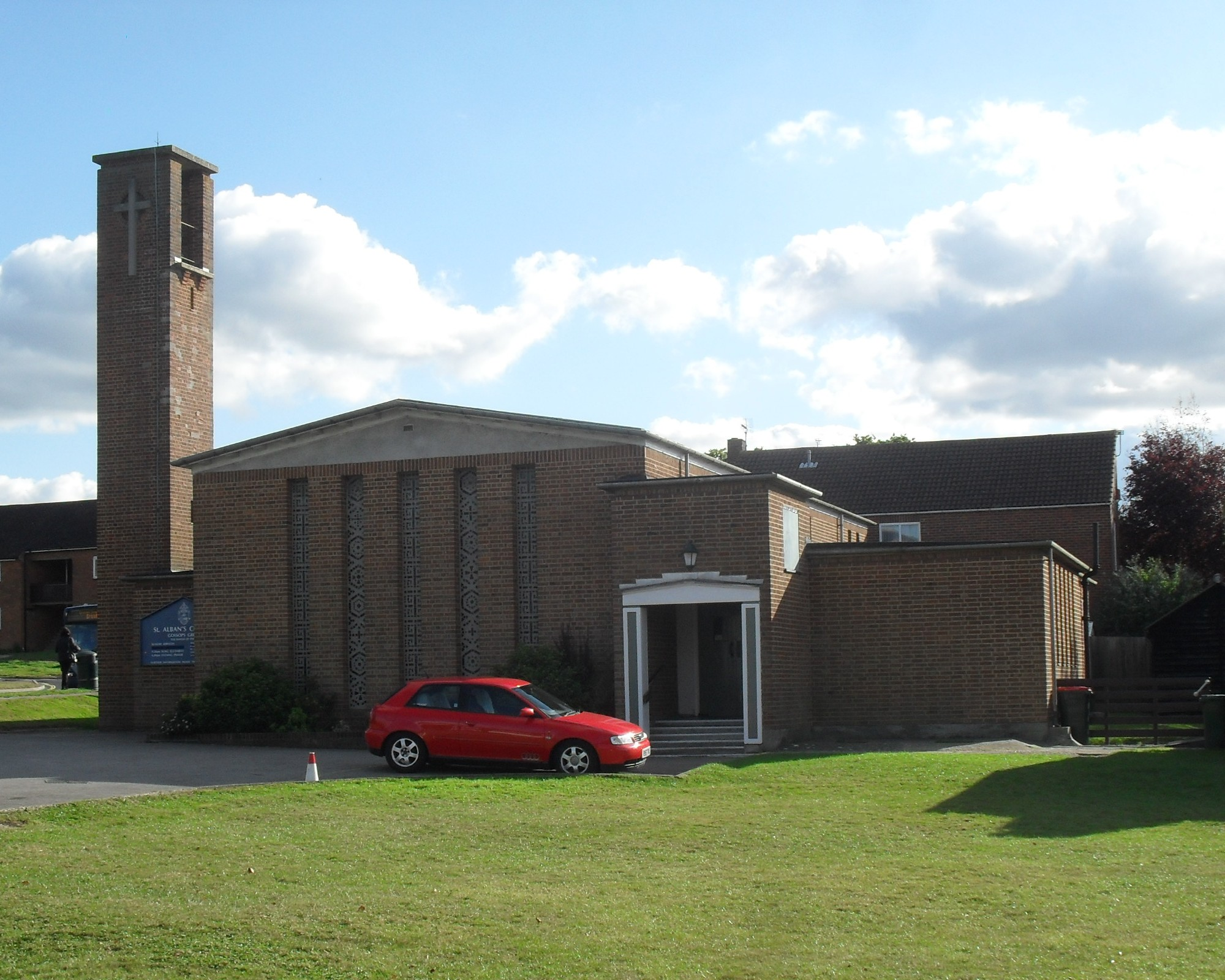
St Alban's Church, Crawley

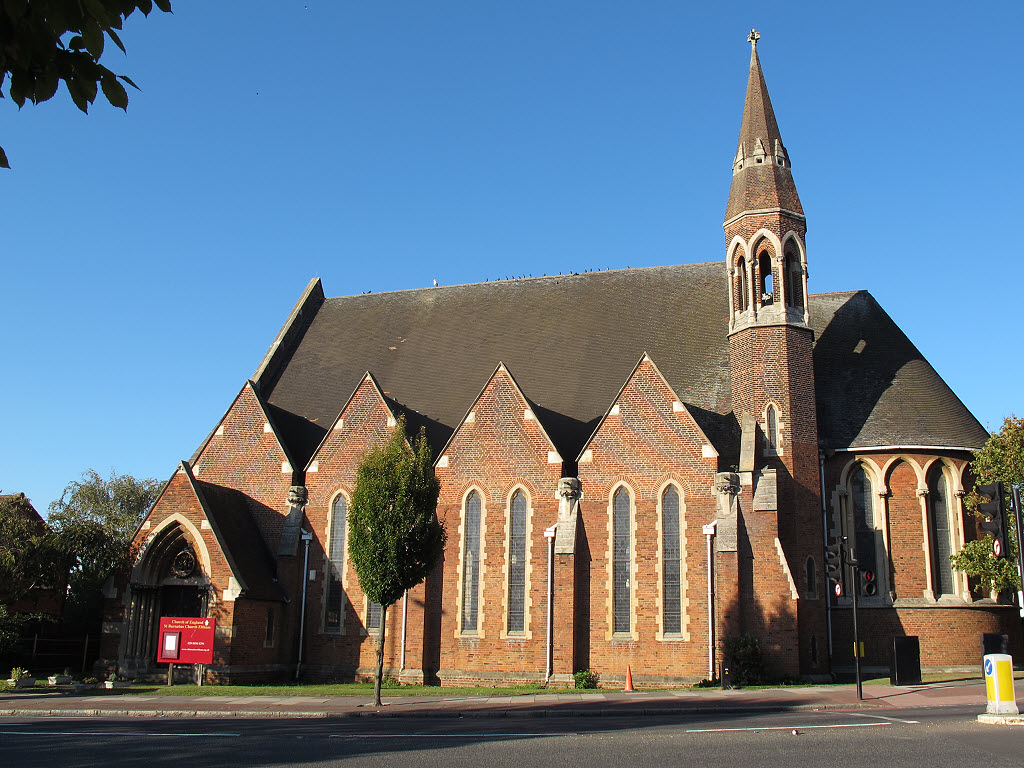
St Barnabas Church, Eltham, where he restored Sir Gilbert Scott's work following war damage in 1944

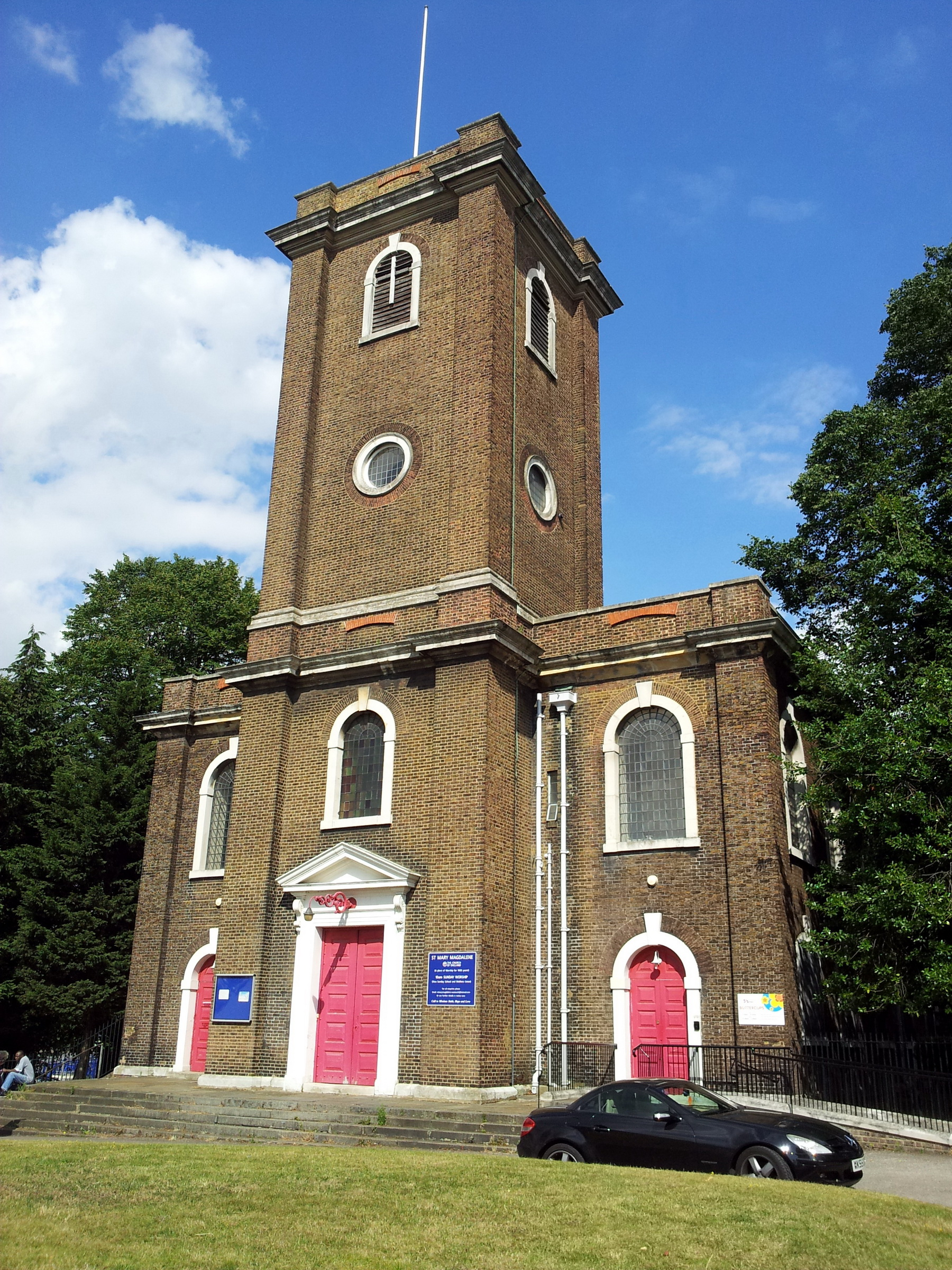
St Mary Magdalene Woolwich

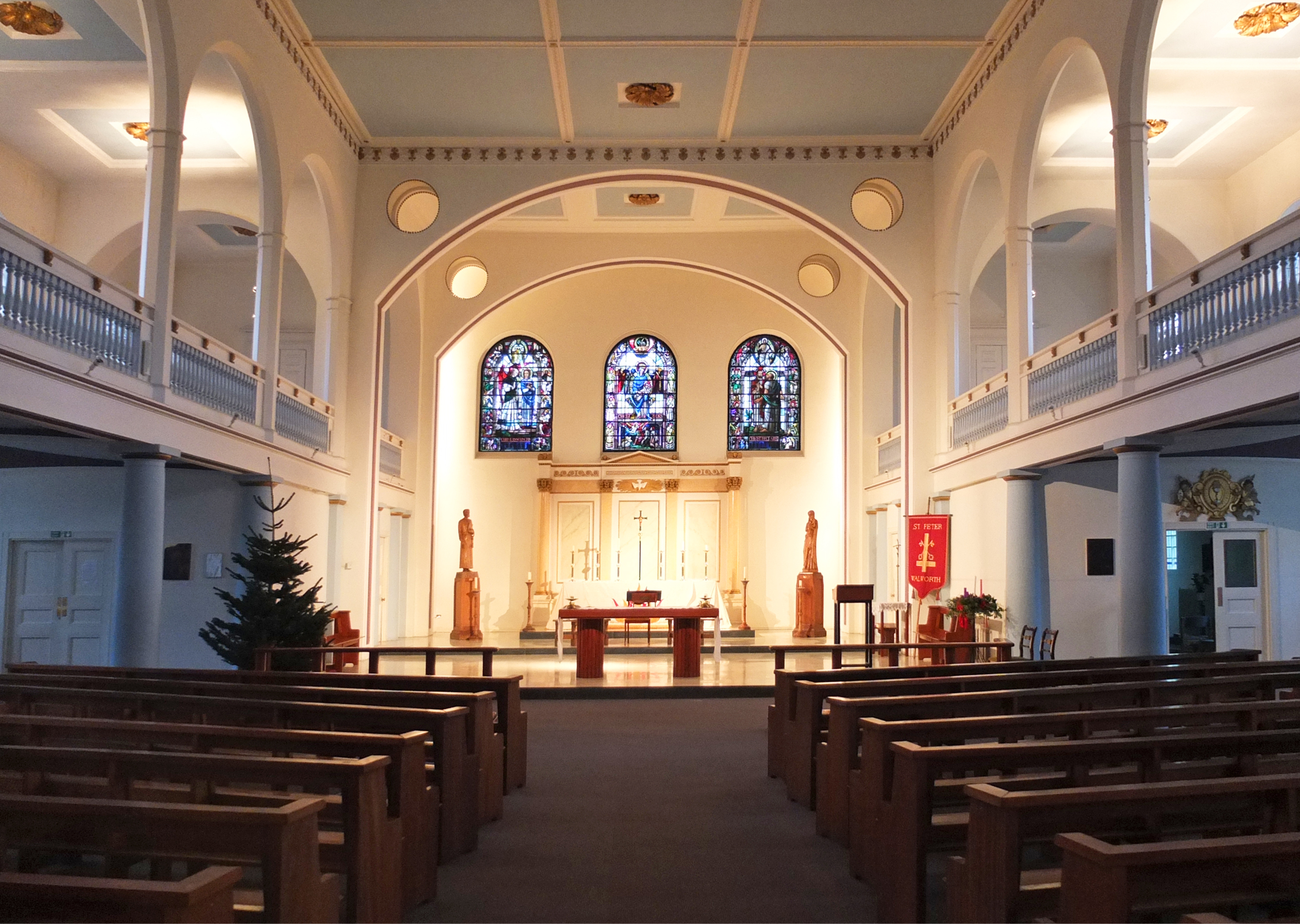
St Peter's Church, Walworth, where Ford completed restoration work in 1953
