= St Mary's Church, Welling =

Parish church in London

Coordinates: 51.466394°N 0.092021227°E

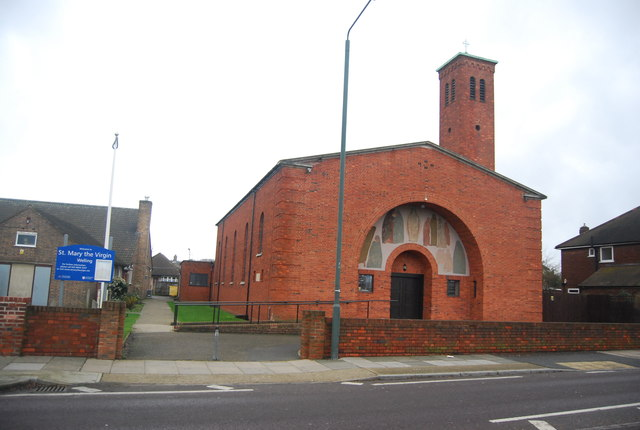
St Mary the Virgin, Welling

St Mary the Virgin Church is a parish church in Welling in the London Borough of Bexley. It is dedicated to the Virgin Mary. The church is in the Archdeaconry of Lewisham & Greenwich, in the Diocese of Southwark. It is notable for the range of 20th-century art contained within it.

== History ==
In 1934, population growth necessitated the construction of a mission hall in the parish of St Michael, East Wickham. The parish records date from 1934. Plans for a permanent church were postponed by WWII. Eventually, the church (which is orientated west) was designed by the Southwark Diocesan architect, Thomas Ford, in 1954, and opened in 1955, when the parish was formally established.

== Features ==
Thomas Ford, the Southwark Diocesan architect, was strongly influenced by Sir John Soane, and many of his churches show signs of Soanian Classicism. His works, however, were more complex than a mere pastiche of Soane. St Mary's, Welling is a good example of Ford's complex designs. Externally, it is in a brick-built Italian Romanesque style, with a partially disengaged campanile in the liturgical north-west. Internally, however, it is in a Soanian Greek revival style.

The church features a large number of works by eminent 20th-century ecclesiastical artists. The liturgical west door is surmounted by a tympanum, which is decorated with sgraffito, an art form rarely found in Britain, but which matches the external design. Sgraffito is a form of tempera mural painting. The artist was Augustus Lunn, the leading proponent of the style in the mid-20th-century. The subjects of the sgraffito are the Joyful Mysteries of the Blessed Virgin Mary. Inside, the reredos on the liturgical east wall is a painted mural of the Ascension by the German émigré artist, Hans Feibusch, with whom Ford often collaborated. On the walls on either side of the Feibusch mural are stained glass windows, by Claire Dawson. They depict two archangels: St Michael (the patron saint of St Mary's mother church) and Uriel. Dawson was also the artist responsible for mural paintings under the arcades, designed according to the doctrine of typology, whereby the events of the Old Testament foreshadow those of the New Testament. The statue of Virgin and Child is carved of limewood, and was the work of the sculptor Philip Bentham (1913-85). The Stations of the Cross were a later introduction, in 1992. They are ceramic, and were installed by John Dawson.

The side chapel is dedicated to St Thomas of Canterbury; the blessed sacrament is reserved in an aumbry in the chapel.

The organ dates from the church's construction, in 1955, and was built by Mander Organs. It is a four-manual, 23-stop instrument. The campanile houses a single bell.

The church is not listed, but was added to the London Borough of Bexley local list in 2011.

== Church groups ==
The church hosts 2nd East Wickham Scout Group and 3rd East Wickham Guide Company.

== Clergy ==
The incumbent is a vicar; some incumbents have been priests-in-charge.

- Robert Cecil Walter Dampier, 1955–60. Dampier had been Curate-in-Charge of St Mary's, Welling Conventional District since 1952.
- Timothy John Raphael, 1960–63. Raphael was subsequently Dean of Dunedin (1965-72) and Archdeacon of Middlesex (1983-96).
- John Broughall, 1964-73
- Noël Walter, 1974-82
- Michael Augustine Owen Lewis, 1984–91. Lewis was subsequently Bishop of Middleton (1999-2007), a suffragan in the Diocese of Manchester. Since 2007 he has been Bishop in Cyprus and the Gulf and since 2019 he has been President Bishop and Primate of the Province of Jerusalem and the Middle East.
- Charles Everett Blankenship, Priest-in-Charge 1991–92, Vicar 1992-99
- Lucille Catherine Gale, 2000-09
- Kim Elizabeth Aston, 2010-17
- Neil Nicholls, Priest-in-Charge since 2019
