= Augustus Lunn =

English tempera and mural painter

Henry Augustus Lunn (always known as Augustus Lunn) (16 August 1905 – 1986) was a British artist and art teacher, best known for works with tempera and large mural paintings.

== Early life ==
Lunn was born in Liverpool in 1905, the son of George Henry Lunn, a clergyman, and his wife Blanche Edith Maude (née Cane Spicer).

== Career ==
Lunn studied at Kingston School of Art, and then won a scholarship to the Royal College of Art, where he won the Edwin Abbey Mural Scholarship at the British School at Rome. He joined the staff at Kingston, but also undertook private commissions. He is regarded as one of the leading figures in the revival of tempera painting in Britain. He exhibited in the New English Art Club and the Royal Academy. In 1943 he applied to the War Artists' Advisory Committee to be a war artist, but was rejected. There was a solo exhibition of his work in 1985, the year before his death, at the Michael Parkin Fine Art Gallery in London.

== Selected works ==
Lunn is barely represented in public art collections. Art UK lists just three works: Composition (1937) in the Jerwood Collection, Fish (1940) in the Wolverhampton Art Gallery, and Objects Observed on a Beach (1945) in the Government Art Collection.

Many more works are held in private collections. Works sold at recent auctions have included Organic Elements (undated) sold by Bonhams in 2005, Pavilion by the Sea, Lowestoft (undated) sold by Christie's in 2008 Gale Warning (1937) sold by Christie's in 2006, Jacob's Dream (1944) sold by Christie's in 2010 Tower on a Hill in a Brooding Landscape (1947) sold by John Nicholsons in 2020; Other works in private hands include Christ Expelling the Money Changers (undated, 1930s) and House under Construction (1937).

His sgraffito mural paintings are his best-known works.

- The reredos depicting Christ preparing his followers to preach the gospel at Bishop Hannington Memorial Church, Hove (1940).
- The cement and plaster mural entitled Sgraffito, depicting a collage of industrial youth engaging in woodworking and reading at desks with the central theme of a bee above a microscope and violin, at Woodberry Down Community JMI School, Woodberry Grove, London Borough of Hackney. The mural was salvaged from the Festival of Britain's South Bank 'Seaside' exhibition (1951).
- Sgraffito mural in the open-air courtyard and patio at The Building Centre on Store Street, London (1952) (since hidden or lost).
- The Joyous Mysteries of the Blessed Virgin Mary on the tympanum surmounting the west door of St Mary's Church, Welling (1955).
- Stencils of Mary the Mother of Jesus and St John the Evangelist either side of the Cross (forming a traditional rood) in the side chapel of St Alfege with St Peter in St Alfege, Greenwich (1956).
- A large (300 sq ft) mural painting depicting the Call of All Creation to Bless the Lord on the wall dividing the hall from the church at St Philip's Church, Hove (1958).
- A grisaille mural of the Epiphany, showing Our Lady above a cot with Christ Child, and influenced by Carlo Crivelli, at Christ Church, Battersea (1959).

== Personal life ==
He married Alice Inez Dawson in 1932. They had one daughter, Blanche (1933–1962). She married Richard Pemberton in 1961, but died the following year. Lunn died in 1986.
