= Henry Wood Hall, London =

Rehearsal and recording hall in London

Coordinates: 51.4987°N 0.0939°W

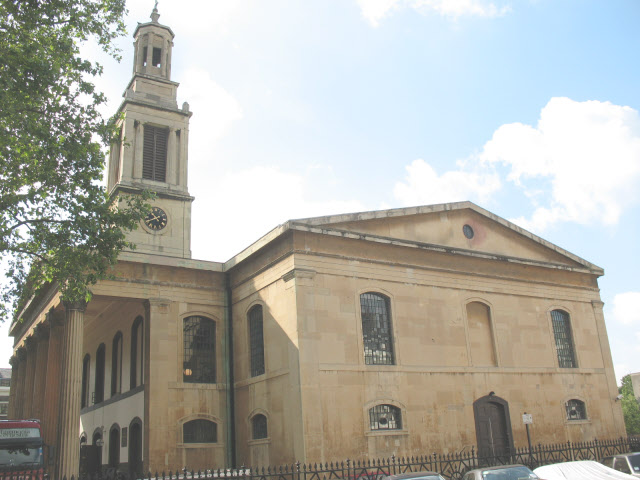
Henry Wood Hall in Southwark

The Henry Wood Hall is a redundant church and orchestral rehearsal and recording studio in Trinity Church Square, Southwark, London, named after the conductor Sir Henry Wood. Formerly the Holy Trinity Church, it was designed in 1823–24 by Francis Octavius Bedford.

In 1970, The London Philharmonic and London Symphony Orchestras carried out an assessment of various churches in London with a view to creating a new permanent orchestral rehearsal studio in London. Following their research into disused churches, the Holy Trinity Church in Southwark was identified and subsequently opened in 1975.

The hall was named after Sir Henry Wood, an English conductor best known for his association with London's annual series of promenade concerts, informally known as the Proms, after receiving a substantial donation from the Henry Wood Fund (set up to rebuild the blitzed Queen's Hall).

Visiting orchestras include the St Petersburg Philharmonic and the Japan Philharmonic which have recorded and rehearsed at the venue with many others.
