= St Luke's Church, West Norwood =

Coordinates: 51°25′57″N 0°6′13″W

St Luke's, West Norwood
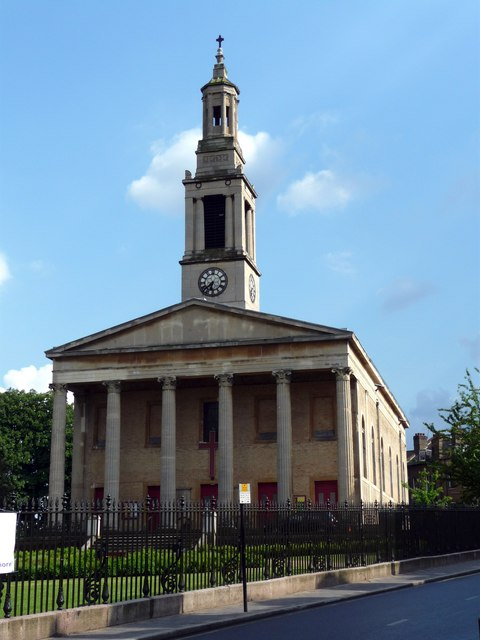
- St Luke's, West Norwood
- Denomination: Church of England
- Churchmanship: Evangelical
- Website: stlukeswestnorwood.wordpress.com

Architecture
- Architect: Francis Octavius Bedford

Administration
- Province: Canterbury
- Diocese: Diocese of Southwark
- Archdeaconry: Lambeth
- Deanery: Lambeth South

Clergy
- Vicar: Rev'd Donald Davis

St Luke's Church in West Norwood is an Anglican church that worships in a Grade II* listed building. It stands on a prominent triangular site at the south end of Norwood Road, where the highway forks to become Knights Hill and Norwood High Street.

== Parish ==
When St Luke's church was first built, the area was sparsely populated and mainly comprised meadows cleared from woodland. The relatively few houses included a mixture of modest cottages and villas for the rich. The only significant public buildings at that stage were the Independent (later Congregationalist) chapel in Chapel Road, which was completed in 1821, and a House of Industry for the Infant Poor in Elder Road. An outline of the vast subsequent changes to the locality appears in the article about West Norwood.

During the nineteenth century, a number of new parishes were created that took in parts of the original parish of St Luke's. These were Holy Trinity Tulse Hill, Christ Church Gipsy Hill, Emmanuel West Dulwich, St Peter Streatham and All Saints West Dulwich.

In 1886, the population of St Luke's parish amounted to 10,377 and was served by four clergy. The total (morning and evening) attendance as a proportion of the parochial population at that time stood at 9.1%. In 1901, the population of the parish stood at 16,180, but in the following year, only one clergyman was in post at St Luke's and attendance at services there represented 6.0% of the parochial population.

Based on statistics from the UK census, the Diocese of Southwark estimates the population of St Luke's parish was 15,400 in 2001 and 16,500 in 2011.

== Building ==
St Luke's Church was designed by Francis Octavius Bedford in 1822, as a result of the Church Building Act 1818, which had been passed in response to the end of the Napoleonic Wars and the growing urban population. It is known as a "Commissioners' church" because it received a grant from the Church Building Commission towards the cost of its construction; the church cost £12,947 to build, and the grant was £6,447. It was constructed along with St. Matthew's, Brixton, St. Mark's, Kennington and St. John's, Waterloo Road. These four "Waterloo churches", each dedicated to one of the four authors of gospels of the New Testament, were specified to have 1800-2000 sittings, vaults for burials, be constructed of brick with stone dressing and cost no more than £13,000 each.

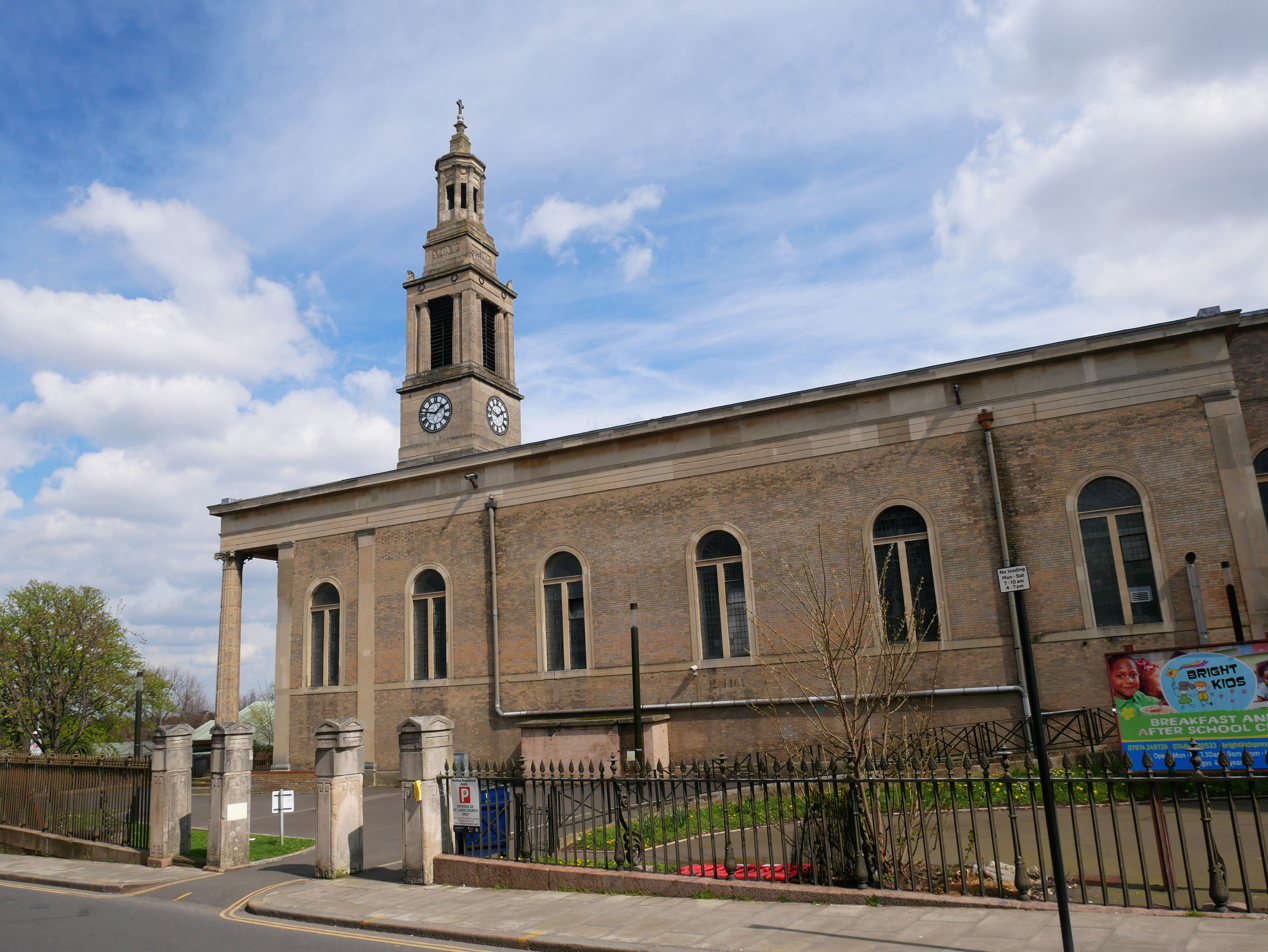
The west face of the Church of Saint Luke

Unusually for a church, it is oriented north–south instead of east–west. This is due to a stipulation in the original planning permission that no building in Lower Norwood should be built within 100 feet of an existing building without the permission of the owner of the other building. An objection from the owner of the Horn's Tavern meant St Luke's had to be built in a north–south orientation to avoid falling within 100 feet of the tavern.

The builder was Mrs Elizabeth Broomfield of Walworth and the foundation stone was laid by the Archbishop of Canterbury on 14 April 1823. The church was consecrated by the Bishop of Winchester on 25 July 1825. The main front, in a rather simplified version of the Corinthian order, has a stone portico with six fluted columns. A tower rises in three stages from the roof just behind the portico. The church is very similar in appearance to St John's, Waterloo, and to two other churches by the same architect: St George, Wells Way, Camberwell, and Holy Trinity, Trinity Square, Southwark.

At first the building was furnished with box pews, galleries and a triple-decker pulpit, with seating for a total congregation of 1,412. The original design had only provided one gallery, above the entrance, facing the altar. This made it possible to have one row of large windows on each of the long sides of the church rather than two storeys of smaller ones Bedford used in churches with side galleries. However, before the church opened, a decision was made to increase its capacity by installing an extra gallery. To avoid blocking the windows, this was put at the end opposite the entrance, and the altar was placed against one of the long walls, with the pulpit and reading desk against the other. Thomas Allen in his History and Antiquities of the Parish of Lambeth (1827) wrote:

Whoever looks at the exterior of this edifice will be greatly disappointed on entering it to find the church has been turned on one side; where he expects to meet with the altar he will find a gallery; if he looks for the pulpit, it meets his eye in an unusual and awkward situation, rendered still more apparent by its relative situation to the altar.

In 1872-3 the building was extensively altered by G. E. Street, who dramatically rearranged the interior, creating a conventional chancel at the end opposite the entrance, and dividing up the nave with Romanesque arcades supporting a plaster barrel vault. The galleries were removed, reducing the seating by more than half. Over the years, various stained glass windows have also been added.

In 1976 the chancel was divided into an upper and lower hall with toilet and kitchen facilities. The kitchen has since been repositioned to occupy the southwestern area of the building, which had previously been used as a Lady Chapel. In 2005 the pews were replaced by red chairs that are usually arranged to face south.

== Churchyard ==
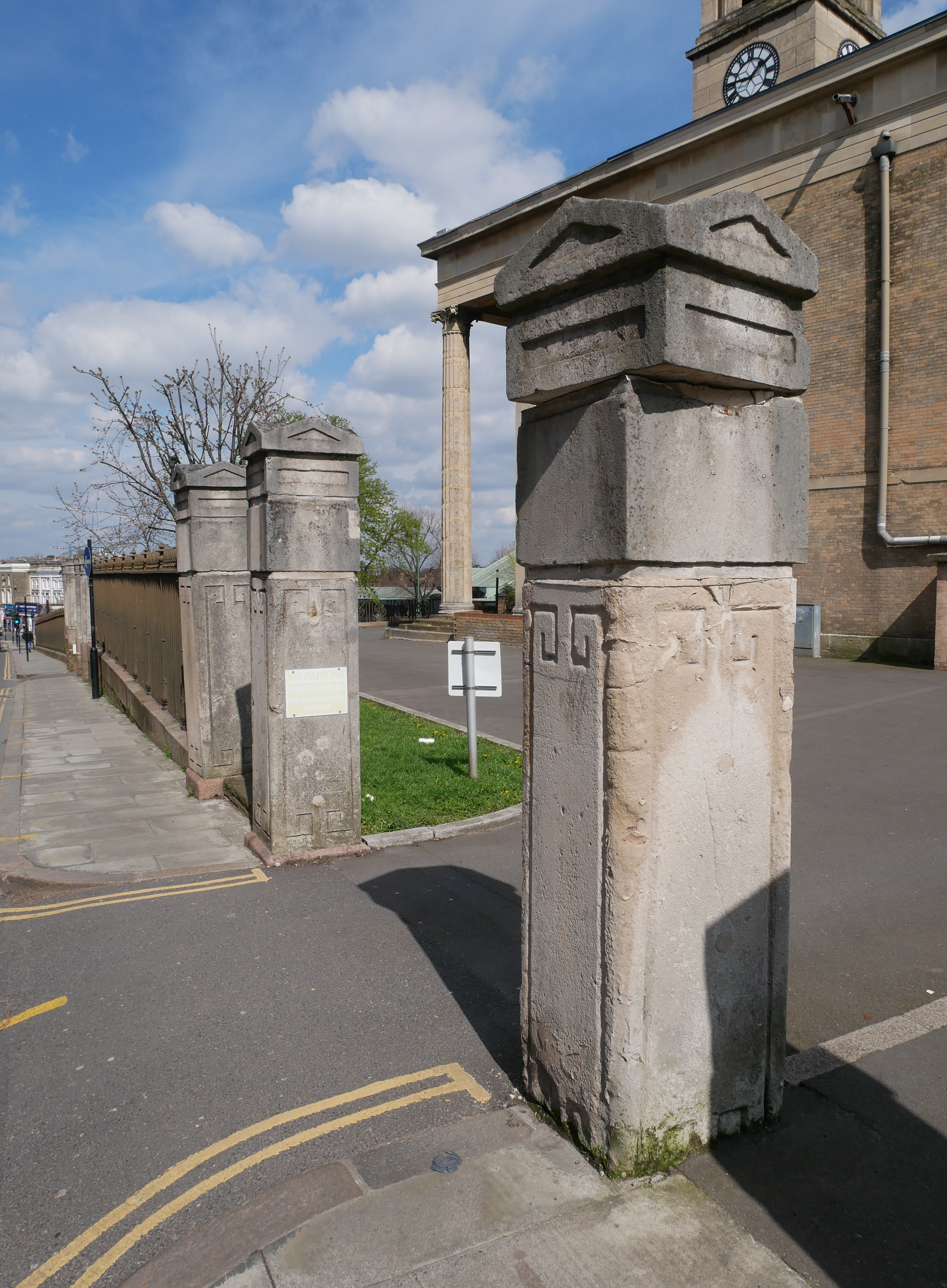
Some of the Grade II listed gate piers around the church

A total of 1,383 people were buried at St Luke's between 1825 and 1894, either in the churchyard or on the vaults under the building. The churchyard has been legally closed, so no further burials may take place there apart from cremated remains.

The northern (i.e. lower level) part of the Churchyard was given to Lambeth Council soon after the Second World War and converted into a memorial garden to remember those who died in that conflict. Lambeth Council has used money from a Section 106 agreement to refurbish these gardens. This section of the churchyard is used on the first Sunday of most months of the year for selling refreshments in connection with the Norwood Feast.

The original ornate railings around the churchyard were removed as wartime "salvage" and only restored in 2009. The elaborate entrance gates from Knights Hill are still missing. The southern (i.e. upper level) part of the churchyard is still owned by the Church but maintained by Lambeth Council.

== Clock ==
The clock is nationally significant. It was installed by Benjamin Lewis Vulliamy in 1827, costing £357, or 3 per cent of the budget for the whole church. In 1825, Vulliamy had travelled on the Continent, observing developments in technology, and returned to England having established a new way to layout the mechanism of his turret clocks, putting it into practice at St Luke's, which therefore has the first ‘flat-bed’ turret clock in England.

The clock has Vulliamy's design of self-levelling pallets and a 2-second pendulum with a heavy bob. In 1928, the original slate dials were replaced with opal glazed versions, allowing for backlighting. The clock did not work for a number of years but was the subject of a major conservation and repair program, completed in May 2017. The dials were reglazed, and automatic winding fitted. The project was undertaken by the Cumbria Clock Company.

== See also ==
- List of Commissioners' churches in London
