= St Peter's Church, Walworth =

Coordinates: 51°29′11.64″N 00°05′33.47″W

St. Peter's Church
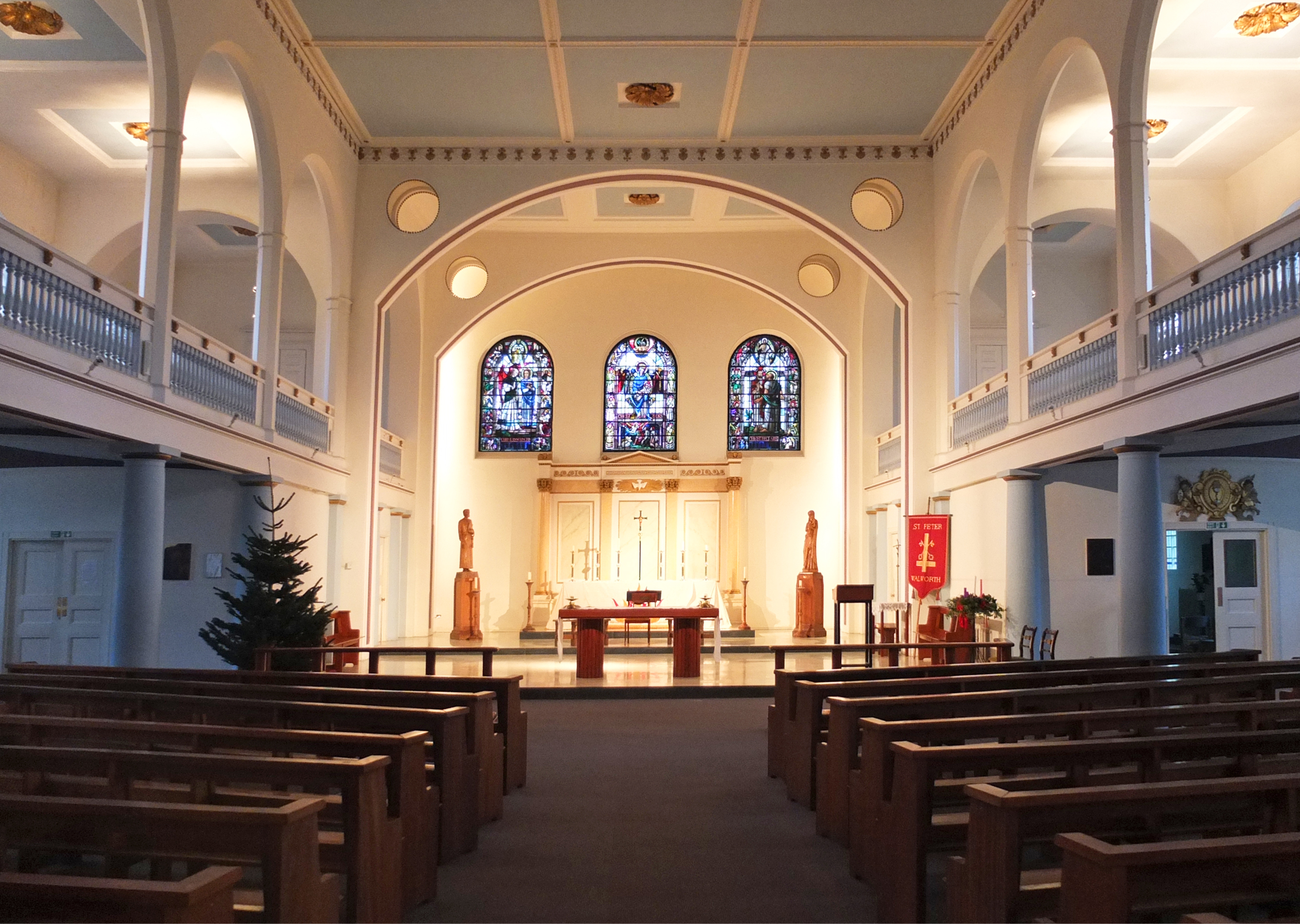
- St Peter's Nave & Chancel
- St. Peter's Church
- OS grid reference: TQ 32531 78127
- Location: Southwark, London
- Country: England
- Denomination: Church of England
- Churchmanship: Liberal Anglo-Catholic
- Website: www.stpeterswalworth.org

Architecture
- Architect(s): John Soane; HMDW Architects
- Years built: 1823–1825

Administration
- Diocese: Anglican Diocese of Southwark

Clergy
- Rector: Father Andrew Mumby, MA (Cantab), BMus (Hons)

St Peter's Church is an inclusive Anglican parish church in Walworth, London, in the Woolwich Episcopal Area of the Anglican Diocese of Southwark. It was built between 1823–25 and was the first church designed by Sir John Soane, in the wave of the church-building following the Napoleonic Wars. It is the best preserved of Soane's churches.

== History ==
It is a Commissioners' church, receiving a grant under the Church Building Act 1818 towards the cost of its construction. The church cost £18,592 (equivalent to £1,760,000 in 2025), and the grant from the Church Building Commission amounted to £9,354. The church is a Grade I listed building.

It resembles two other churches by the same architect — in particular Holy Trinity Church Marylebone — in its use of London stock brickwork with stone dressings, and carries the Soane hallmark of tall arched windows set in recesses. The depressed Ionic front with cornice and balustrade over avoids the architectural problems encountered when a pediment is used.

The east end was altered in 1888, and following wartime bomb damage, major reconstruction was carried out in 1953. The interior was re-ordered in 1982. St Peter's has always maintained a catholic tradition of worship, pastoral care and mission within the parish of Walworth, St Peter.

The crypt was used as an air raid shelter during WW2: the war-time Rector estimated that between 600 and 900 people sheltered there every night. The building was badly damaged by German bombing on 29 October 1940, when more than 30 of those sheltering in the crypt were killed outright (67 eventually died) and 100 more were injured. The church was restored under the direction of Thomas F. Ford and was re-dedicated by the Bishop of Southwark on 11 July 1953.

The organ is a 1949 Harrison & Harrison instrument, installed in 2009 by Heritage Pipe Organs, which had previously been located at the chapel at the former location of Whitelands College in Putney. The previous organ was an 1824 Henry Cephas Lincoln instrument, which survived the war-time bomb damage and was restored in 1953 by Mander Organs. The National Pipe Organ Register does not record that organ's present whereabouts.

There is a ring of eight bells, all cast in 1971 at the Whitechapel Bell Foundry.

The churchyard closed to burials in 1853. In 1895 the philanthropic Rector, Canon John Horsley (Mayor of Southwark in 1910), arranged for it to be converted to a public garden at the cost of the Goldsmiths' Company. The Metropolitan Public Gardens Association laid it out with grass and seats.

== Present day ==
Today, St Peter's thrives as an Anglican parish church serving the community of East Walworth. St Peter's also enjoys close links with St Peter's CofE Primary School and nursery, where the Rector is Chair of Governors. The joyful Parish Mass is at 10.30am on Sundays.

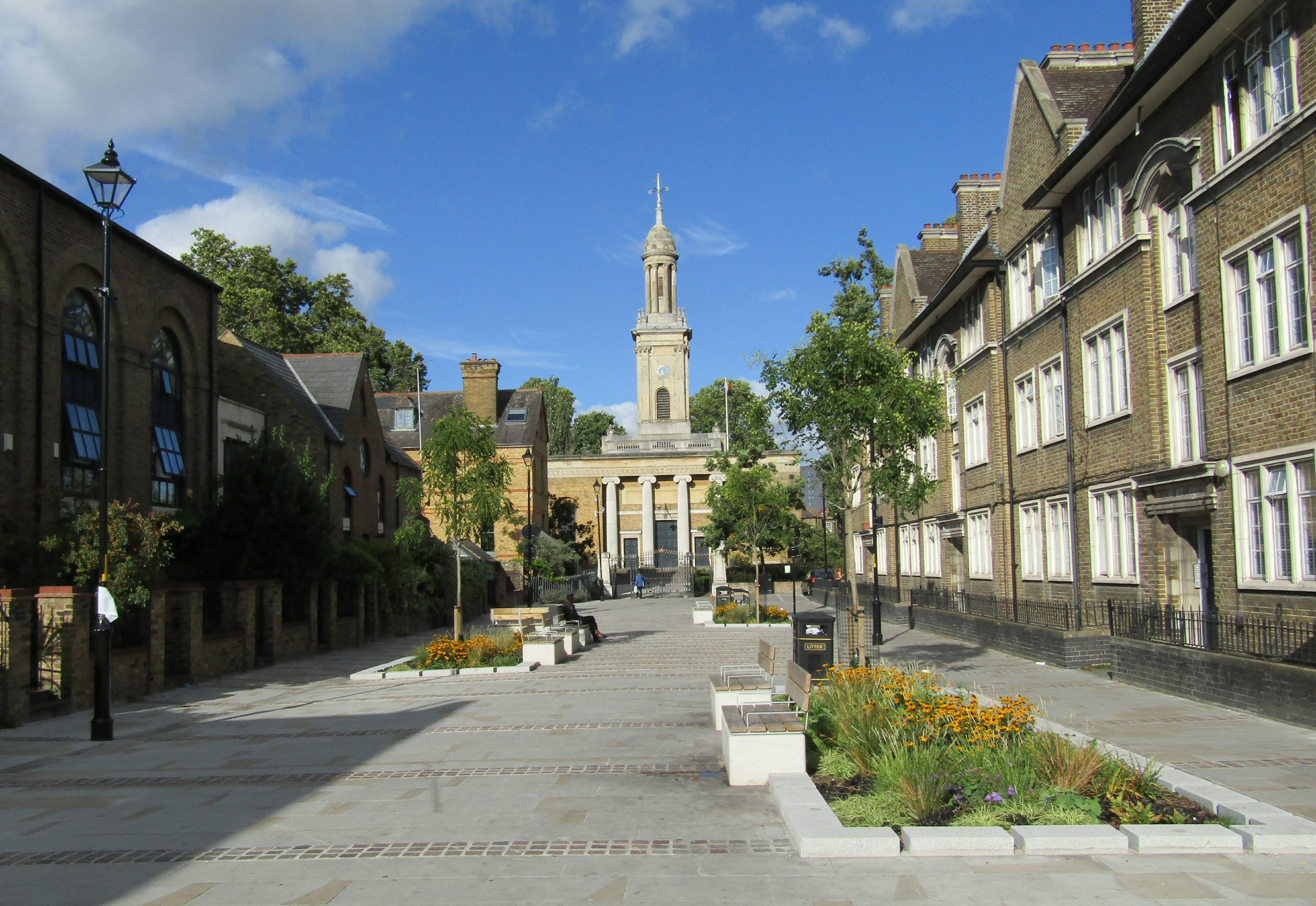
View from Liverpool Grove, 2023

In 2022, Southwark Council completed the pedestrianisation of Liverpool Grove to the front of the church.

== Restoration ==
The crypt was redeveloped by the church recently and is now home to Trampoline CIC ( a social enterprise that promotes and supports community entrepreneurship) and also Saint Louie Bakery and Cafe (who also manage the hire of the hall and a meeting room for private and public use such as performances, parties, conferences, agms & workshops). HMDW Architects designed the project, and are the quinquennial architects for the building.

The main worship space was restored, including work to the reredos, and the installation of a new lighting scheme.

== Gallery ==
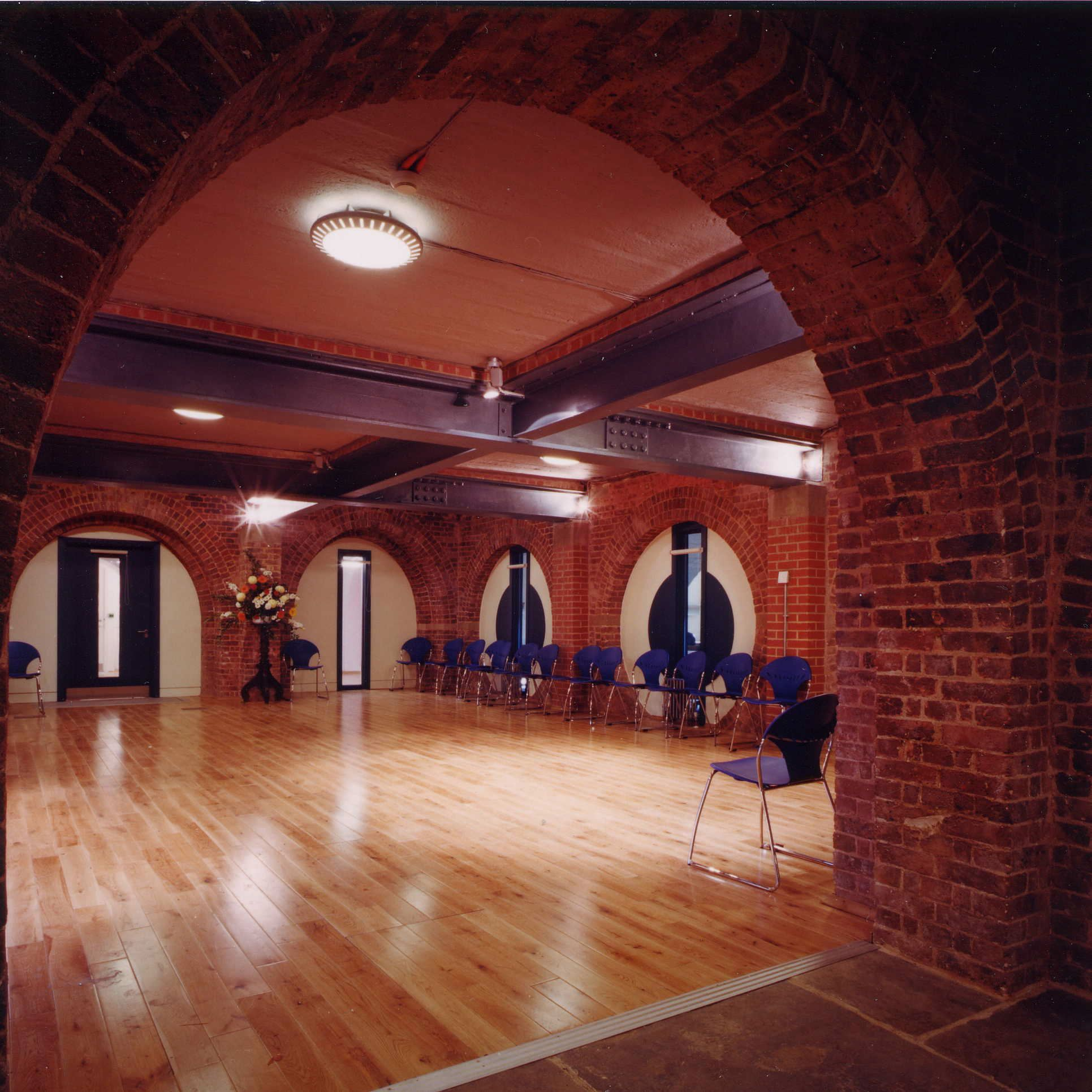
Crypt Hall directly below the Nave

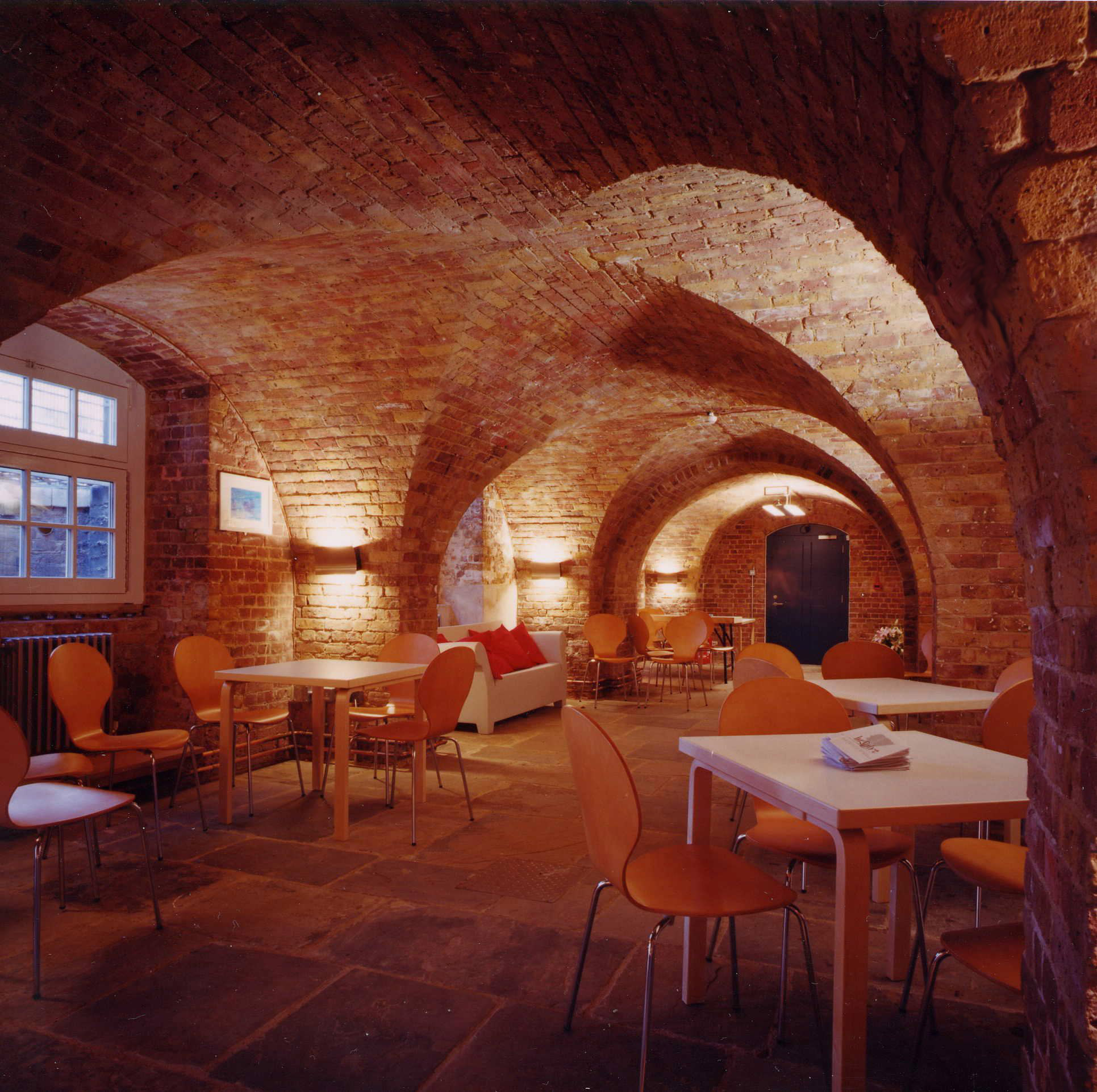
Cafe in the crypt

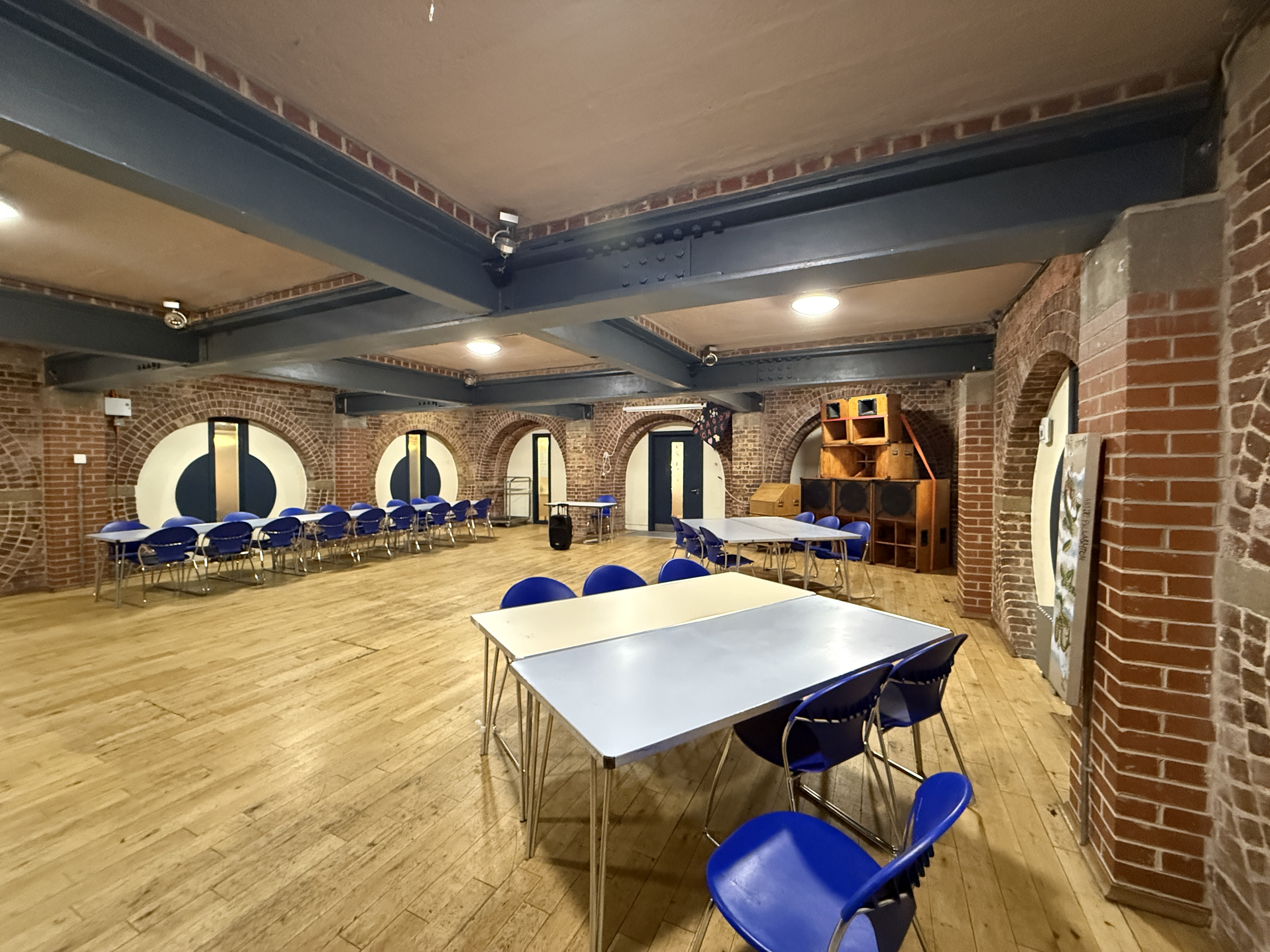
The Hall

== See also ==
- List of Commissioners' churches in London
