= Francis Octavius Bedford =

English ecclesiastical architect

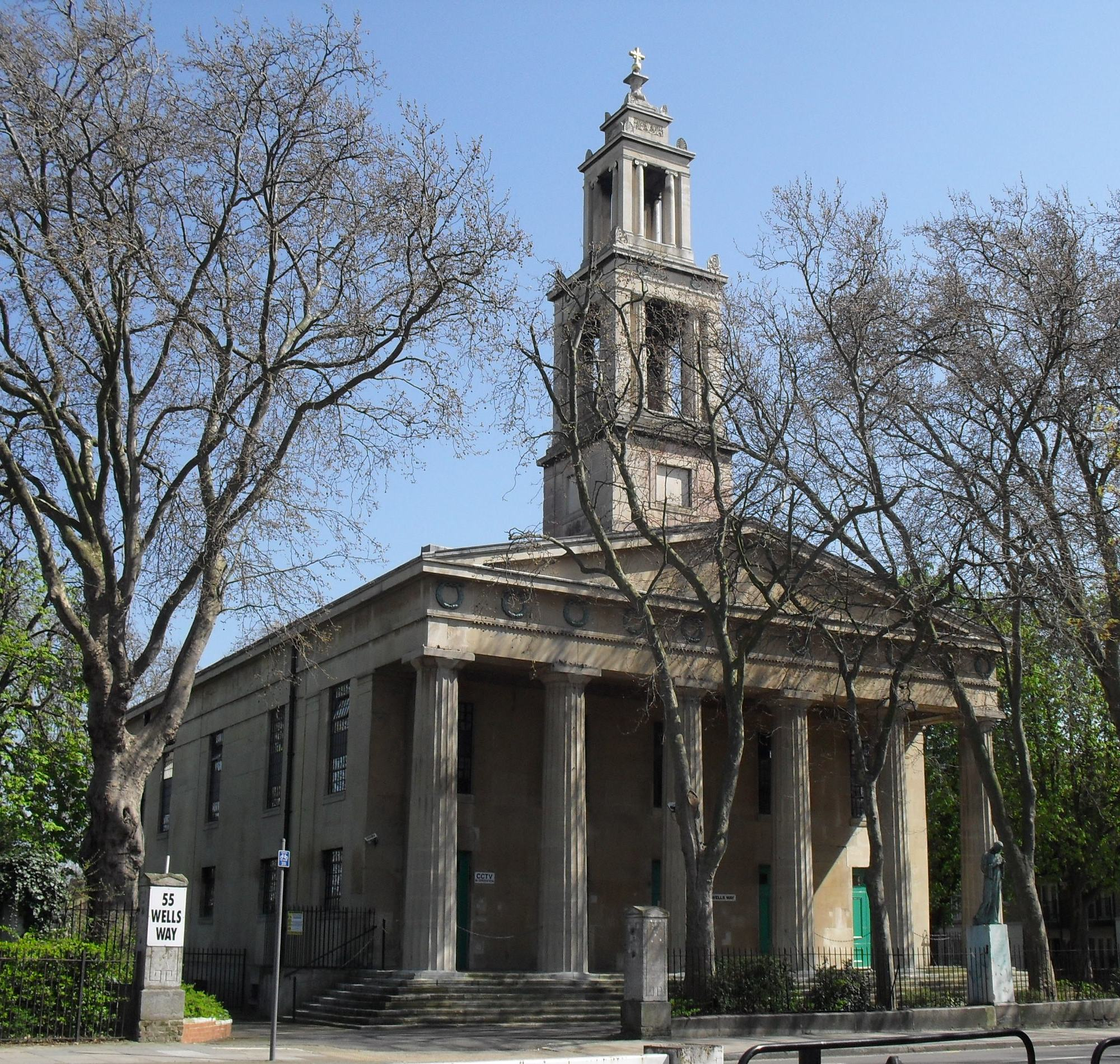
- Born: 1784
- Died: 1858 (aged 73–74); Greenhithe, Kent, England
- Occupation: Architect

Francis Octavius Bedford (1784–1858) was an English ecclesiastical architect, who designed four Greek Revival churches in south London during the 1820s. He later worked in the Gothic style.

== Life and career ==
Little is known about Bedford's early years. In 1812–13 he was one of two draughtsmen (along with John Peter Gandy) who accompanied William Gell on an expedition sent to Greece and Asia Minor to record Classical antiquities on behalf of the Society of Dilettanti. He is also known to have corresponded with Charles Robert Cockerell on the subject of Greek architecture.

In 1818 Bedford was placed second to William and Henry Inwood in the competition to design St Pancras New Church.

Bedford was the architect of four south London Greek Revival Commissioner's Churches: St George's, Camberwell (1822–1824), St John's, Waterloo, (1823–24), St Luke's, West Norwood, (1823–1825) and Holy Trinity Church, Newington, Southwark (1823–24, now the Henry Wood Hall). The designs were rather similar, a fact that provoked a negative reaction from some contemporary critics. Reviewing St John's in 1827, The Gentleman's Magazine commented "After the description of St. George's Church, Camberwell ... it will be unnecessary to go into a minute detail of the present edifice. The monotony of Mr. Bedford's designs has already been noticed under the head of that building, as well as Trinity Church, Newington."

The four buildings (all of which survive) have a portico with a tower rising immediately behind it out of the body of the church, after the pattern of St Martin-in-the-Fields, although at Holy Trinity, standing in the southern part of a square, Bedford varied the formula by placing the portico against the long north side of the nave. The interiors originally had flat ceilings and galleries supported on columns, although St Luke's was initially designed with a gallery at the west end only. At St John's and St George's, Bedford used an unusual variant of the Doric order based on that of the Choragic Monument of Thrasyllus in Athens, with myrtle wreaths replacing the triglyphs on the frieze. His other two Neoclassical South London churches used the Corinthian order, although one contemporary writer felt the version used at St. Luke's was so bare of ornamentation, that, to the untutored eye it more resembled the Ionic.

Bedford later used a Gothic Revival style for churches, at St Mary-the-Less, Lambeth (1828), St George, Newcastle-under-Lyme (1828), Holy Trinity, Little Queen Street Holborn (1829–31) Holy Trinity, Horwich (1830–31) and St James, Ridding, Derbyshire (1832). In 1849 he built, or rebuilt, a stuccoed house for Richard Arabin at High Beach, Essex.

He exhibited drawings of Greek architecture at the Royal Academy between 1814 and 1817, and designs for Trinity Church, St. Giles's and A Chapel for a Cemetery in 1831 and 1832 respectively.

He died at his home at Greenhithe, Kent on 13 March 1858.

== Family ==
He married Sophia Curtis of Camberwell in 1814; she died, aged 43, in 1839. His son Francis Bedford was a notable photographer, and his grandson Francis Donkin Bedford was an artist and book illustrator.

== List of works ==
- St George's Church, Camberwell, London (1822–24), now converted into apartments.
- St John the Evangelist, Waterloo Road, Lambeth, London (1823–24).
- Holy Trinity Church, Newington, Southwark, London (1823–24), now the Henry Wood Hall.
- St Luke's Church, West Norwood, London (1823–25).
- St George's Church, Newcastle-under-Lyme, Staffordshire (1827–28).
- St Mary-the-Less, Black Prince Road, Lambeth (1828); demolished 1967.
- Holy Trinity Church, Little Queen Street, Holborn, London (1829–31), demolished.
- Christ Church, Tunstall, Staffordshire (1830–31).
- Holy Trinity Church, Horwich, Lancashire (1830–31).
- St James' Church, Riddings, Derbyshire (1830–31).

== Gallery of architectural work ==
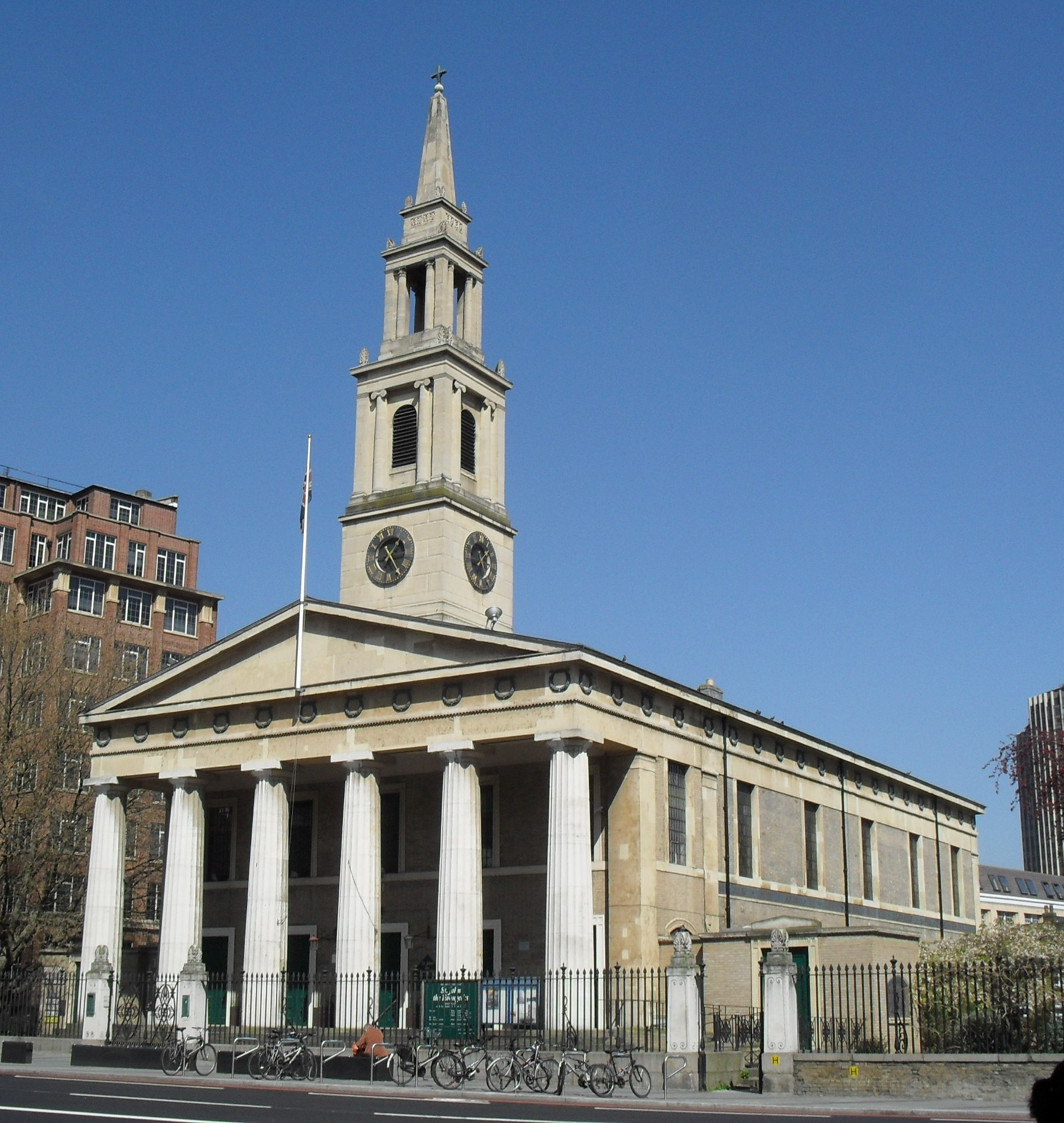
St John the Evangelist, Waterloo Road

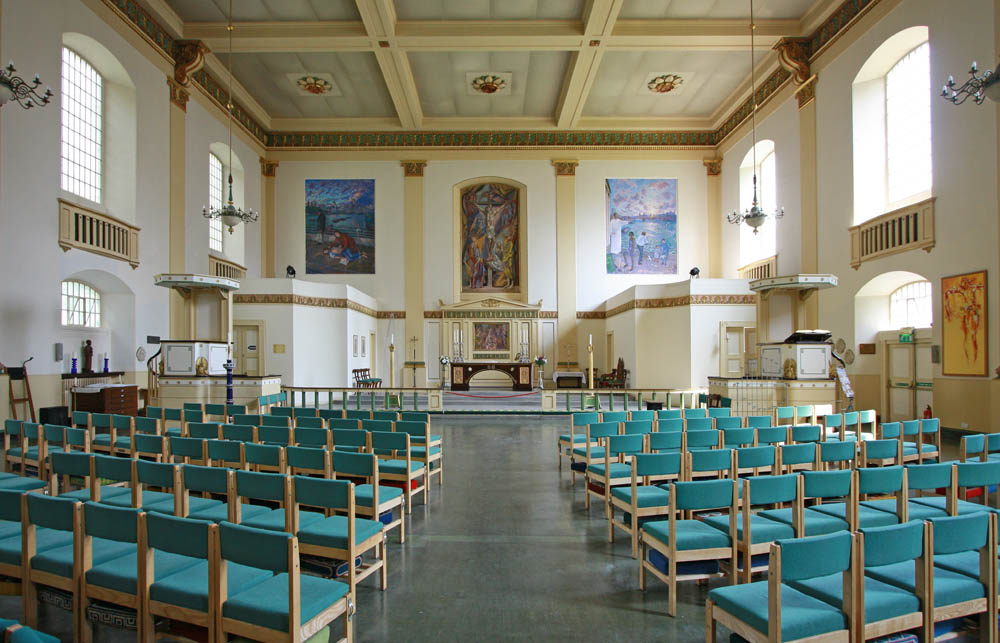
St John the Evangelist, Waterloo Road

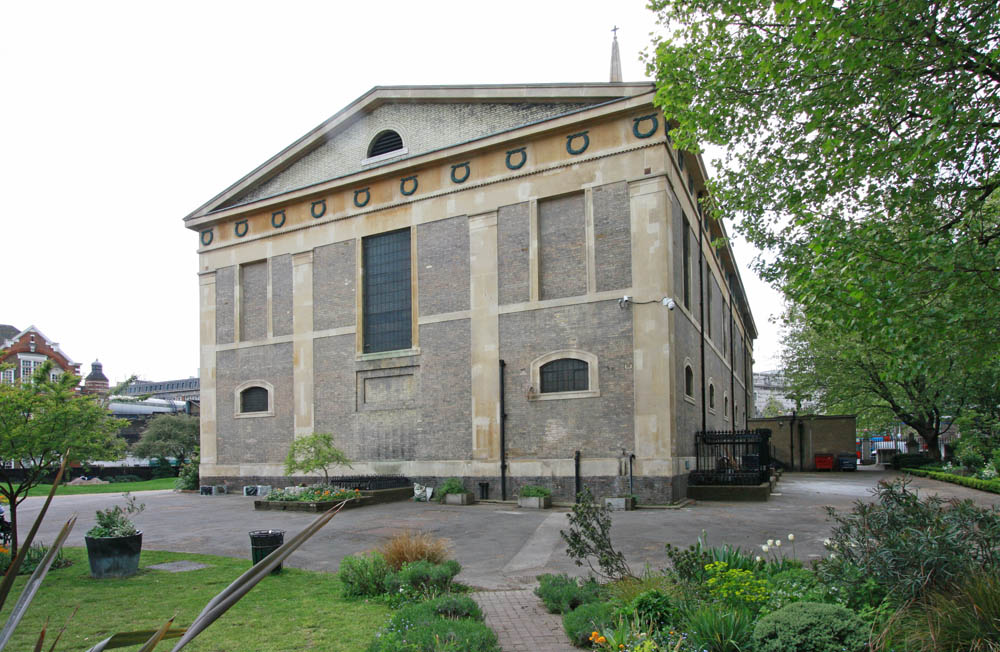
St John the Evangelist, Waterloo Road

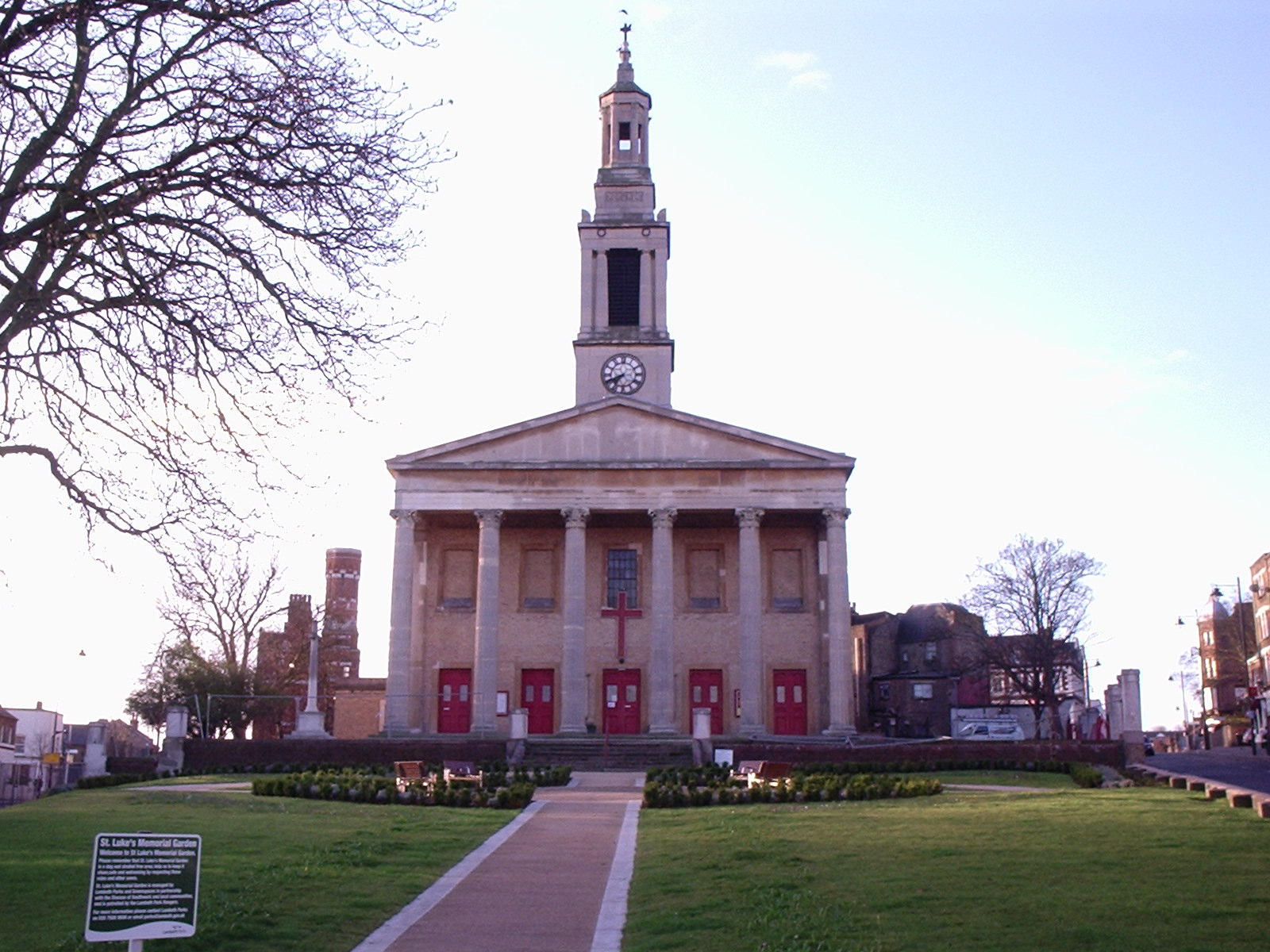
St Luke's Church, West Norwood

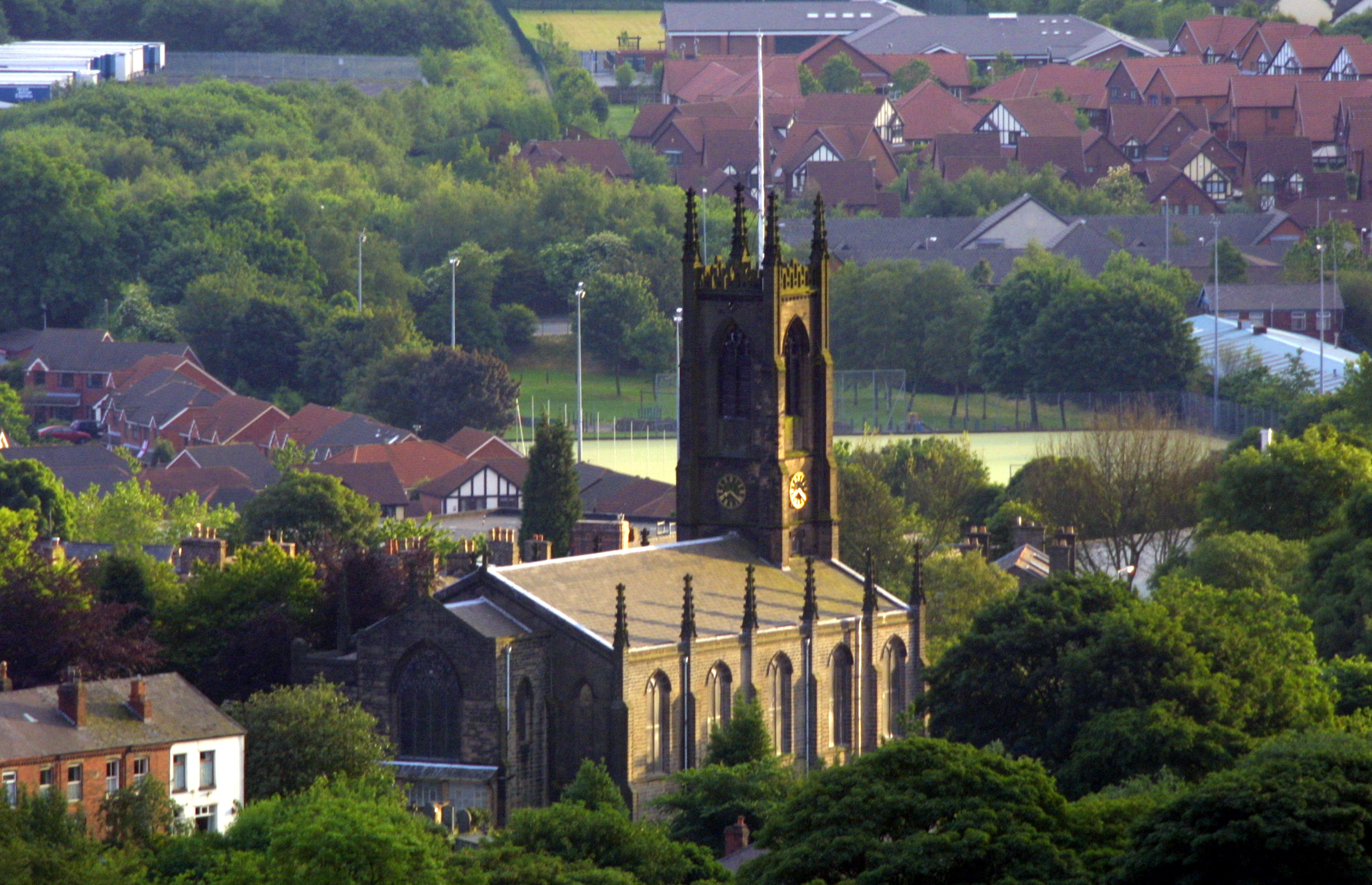
Holy Trinity Church, Horwich

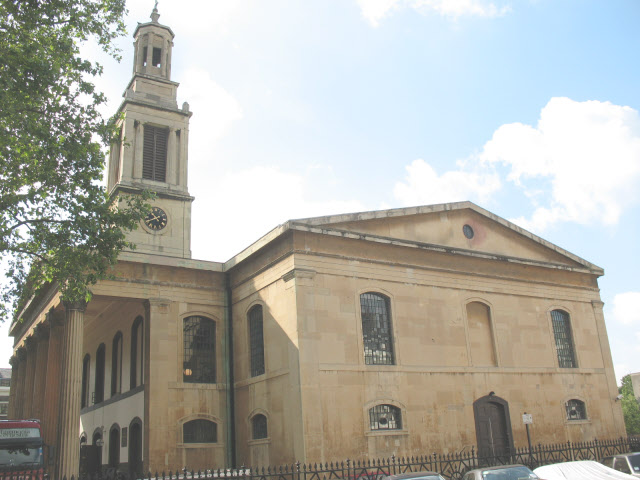
Former Holy Trinity, Southwark, from the south-west

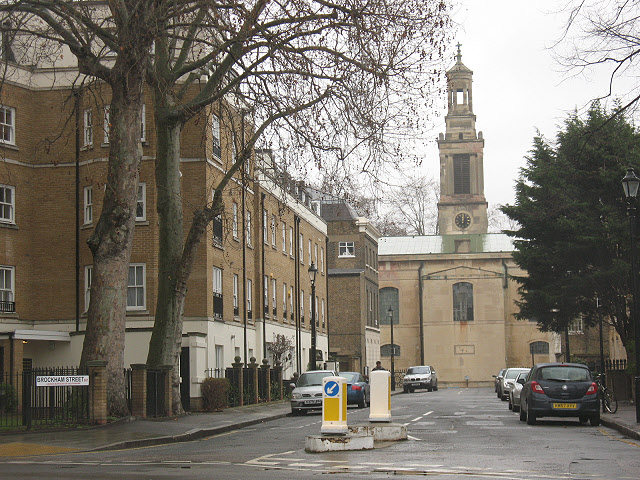
Former Holy Trinity, Southwark, east end

== See also ==
- Commissioners' church
