= Archdeacons in the Diocese of Southwark =

Senior clergy in the Church of England

The Archdeacons in the Diocese of Southwark are senior clergy in the Church of England in South London and Surrey. They currently include: the archdeacons of Southwark, of Reigate (formerly of Kingston-on-Thames) and of Lewisham & Greenwich (formerly of Lewisham), the Archdeacon of Croydon and the archdeacons of Wandsworth and of Lambeth. Each one has responsibility over a geographical area within the diocese.

== History ==
The Diocese of Southwark was created on 1 May 1905 from two Diocese of Rochester archdeaconries: the archdeaconry of Southwark and the archdeaconry of Kingston-on-Thames. Parts of Surrey (from the dioceses of Winchester and of London) had first been transferred to Rochester diocese on 1 August 1877, and were organised into the Southwark archdeaconry on 3 May 1878. In 1864, the Bishop of Winchester had split the rural deanery of Southwark into three: Lambeth, Southwark, and Streatham. The Kingston archdeaconry was then created by Order in Council soon after, on 22 August 1879, by splitting the archdeaconry of Southwark: the new Kingston archdeaconry consisted of the rural deaneries of Barnes, Beddington, Godstone, Kingston, Reigate, and Streatham; and the continuing Southwark one those of Battersea, Camberwell, Clapham, Kennington, Lambeth, Newington, and Southwark. Lewisham rural deanery was erected, and other deanery boundaries altered, in early 1886.

Not long after the erection of the Diocese of Southwark, the new archdeaconry of Lewisham was created, on 6 March 1906, from part of the Southwark archdeaconry (Camberwell and Dulwich deaneries) and part of the diocese not then in an archdeaconry (Greenwich, Lewisham, and Woolwich deaneries; which had previously been in the Archdeaconry of Rochester).

The archdeaconry of Wandsworth was created in 1973, the Croydon archdeaconry (er. 1930) was moved from the Diocese of Canterbury on 1 January 1985. In 1986, the archdeaconry of Reigate was created from a renaming and reorganisation of the previous archdeaconry of Kingston-on-Thames and the archdeaconry of Lambeth was created from Southwark archdeaconry. Lewisham archdeaconry was renamed the Archdeaconry of Lewisham & Greenwich in 2008.

== Current composition ==
As of January 2021, the six archdeaconries of the Diocese of Southwark comprise the following 24 deaneries:

- Archdeaconry of Southwark: Deaneries of Bermondsey, of Camberwell, of Dulwich, and of Southwark & Newington
- Archdeaconry of Reigate: Deaneries of Tandridge, of Reigate, and of Sutton
- Archdeaconry of Lewisham & Greenwich: Deaneries of Charlton, of Deptford, of East Lewisham, of Eltham & Mottingham, of Plumstead, and of West Lewisham
- Archdeaconry of Croydon: Deaneries of Croydon Addington, of Croydon Central, of Croydon North, and of Croydon South
- Archdeaconry of Wandsworth: Deaneries of Battersea, of Kingston, of Richmond & Barnes, of Tooting, and of Wandsworth
- Archdeaconry of Lambeth: Deaneries of Lambeth North, of Lambeth South, and of Merton

== List of archdeacons ==
=== Archdeacons of Southwark ===
- 1879–1882 (res.): Samuel Cheetham
- 1882–19 March 1904 (d.): John Richardson
- 1904–1921 (res.): Samuel Taylor (also Bishop suffragan of Kingston from 1915)

On 1 May 1905, Southwark archdeaconry was moved from Rochester diocese to the newly-created Diocese of Southwark.

- 1922–1926 (res.): Percy Herbert, Bishop suffragan of Kingston
- 1927–1952 (res.): Frederick Hawkes, Bishop suffragan of Kingston
- 1952–1955 (res.): William Gilpin, Bishop suffragan of Kingston
- 1955–1966 (ret.): Havilland Sands
- 1967–1973 (res.): Reginald Bazire
- 1973–1982 (res.): Michael Whinney (became Bishop of Aston)
- 1982–1985 (res.): Wilfred Wood (became Bishop of Croydon)
- 1985–2004 (ret.): Douglas Bartles-Smith (afterwards Archdeacon emeritus)
- 2004–2012 (res.): Michael Ipgrave (later Bishop of Lichfield from 2016)
- 2012–2013 (act.): Dianna Gwilliams (became Dean of Guildford)
- 2013–2021 (res.): Jane Steen (became Bishop of Lynn)
- 15 May 2022 – present: Jonathan Sedgwick (Acting Archdeacon from May 2021 until 30 June 2022)

=== Archdeacons of Kingston-on-Thames and of Reigate ===
- 1879–1904 (res.): Charles Burney
- 1904–1916 (res.): George Daniell

The Archdeaconry of Kingston was moved from Rochester diocese to the newly-created Diocese of Southwark on 1 May 1905.

- 1916–1918 (res.): William Hough (became Bishop of Woolwich)
- 1919–1931 (res.): Robert Joynt
- 1931–1946 (ret.): George Marten (afterwards Archdeacon emeritus)
- 1946–1952 (ret.): Nicol Anderson (afterwards Archdeacon emeritus)
- 1953–28 November 1976 (d.): Percy Robb
- 1977–1988 (ret.): Bernard Jacob (afterwards Archdeacon emeritus)

In 1986, the archdeaconry was renamed to Reigate.

- 1988–1995 (ret.): Peter Coombs (afterwards Archdeacon emeritus)
- 1996–2000 (ret.): Martin Baddeley
- 2001 – 23 February 2016 (ret.): Danny Kajumba (afterwards Archdeacon emeritus)
- April–July 2015 (act.): Andrew Cunnington
- Oct–Dec 2015 (act.): John Kronenberg
- 18 December 2015 – 20 October 2016 (act.): Jonathan Clark, also Bishop of Croydon
- 30 October 2016 – 2025 (res.): Moira Astin (consecrated Bishop of Crediton, 6 July 2025)
- January 2026 onwards: Geoff Dumbreck (announced)

=== Archdeacons of Lewisham and of Lewisham & Greenwich ===
- 1906–3 March 1919 (d.): Charles Escreet
- 1919–1932 (ret.): William Hough, Bishop suffragan of Woolwich
- 1932–19 July 1936 (d.): Arthur Preston, Bishop suffragan of Woolwich
- 1936–1947 (res.): Leslie Lang, Bishop suffragan of Woolwich
- 1947–1955 (res.): Robert Stannard, Bishop suffragan of Woolwich
- 1955–1960 (res.): Laurie Brown
- 1960–1972 (ret.): William Hayman
- 1972–1985 (ret.): Ivor Davies (afterwards Archdeacon emeritus)
- 1985–1989 (ret.): Clifford Lacey (afterwards Archdeacon emeritus) [b. 1 April 1921 – d. 16 February 1997; wartime service RAFVR; educated at King's College London; curacies: Crofton Park, Kingston upon Thames; incumbencies: Merton, Eltham]
- 1989–1996 (res.): Gordon Kuhrt (afterwards Archdeacon emeritus)
- 1996–2001 (res.): David Atkinson
- September 2001–30 November 2012 (ret.): Christine Hardman (afterwards Archdeacon emeritus)

In 2008, the archdeaconry was renamed Lewisham & Greenwich.

- 14 April 2013–3 July 2024 (res.): Alastair Cutting (became Area Bishop of Woolwich)
- 20 September 2024 – present: Chigor Chike

=== Archdeacons of Wandsworth ===
- 1973–1975 (ret.): Reginald Bazire
- 1975–1988 (res.): Peter Coombs
- 1989–2004 (ret.): David Gerrard (afterwards Archdeacon emeritus)
- 2004–September 2015 (res.): Stephen Roberts
- 22 July–22 November 2015 (act.): Tim Marwood
- 22 November 2015–2025 (ret.): John Kiddle
- 6 July 2025 – present: Bridget Shepherd

=== Archdeacons of Lambeth ===
- 1986–1988 (ret.): Charles Pinder (afterwards Archdeacon emeritus)
- 1988–1999 (res.): Dick Bird
- 2000–2003 (res.): Nick Baines (became Bishop of Croydon)
- 2004–14 April 2013 (res.): Chris Skilton
- 2013–present: Simon Gates
  - 2018 (act.): David Stephenson
