= Kuhrt =

Kuhrt (also Kührt) is a surname. Notable people with the surname include:

- Amélie Kuhrt (born 1944), British historian
- Gordon Kuhrt (born 1941), British priest and author
- Veit Kührt (born 1940), German ski jumper

== See also ==
- Jacob Kuhrts (1832–1926)
- Kurt (surname)
