= George Daniell (priest) =

English Anglican priest

George William Daniell (15 March 1853 – 11 March 1931) was an English Anglican priest who served as the Archdeacon of Kingston-upon-Thames from 1904 until 1916.

Daniell was born into an ecclesiastical family and educated at Hurstpierpoint and Balliol College, Oxford. He was chaplain of King's College London, chaplain of Dulwich College, Chancellor of Southwark Cathedral from 1909 until 1916; and finally Vicar of St Matthew's, Redhill until his retirement in January 1927. There is a memorial to him in the chancel.

Church of England titles
Preceded by Charles Burney	Archdeacon of Kingston; 1904–1916	Succeeded by William Hough
