= Rochester Theological College =

Former Anglican theological college

Rochester Theological College (1959–1970) was an Church of England theological college for the Diocese of Rochester in Kent, England. It focused on the provision of theological education for mature non-graduates.

== History ==
The college was founded by the Bishop of Rochester, the Rt Rev Christopher Chavasse. The college closed in 1970, by which point 182 men had been trained for ordination.

From 1960 the college occupied the former Deanery. After closure in 1970 it became the sixth form centre for the King's School, Rochester.

The college's archives are held at the Medway Archives Centre.

== Wardens ==
- Robert Stannard, 1959-60 (as Dean of Rochester).
- Stuart Blanch, 1960–66, later Bishop of Liverpool and Archbishop of York
- Stanley Allen, 1966-70

== Notable alumni ==
- Ted Francis, Archdeacon of Bromley 1979–94.
