= Paul Wright (archdeacon of Bromley & Bexley) =

British Anglican priest (born 1954)

- Archdeacon of Bromley & Bexley
- Diocese: Rochester
- In office: December 2003 – 2022
- Predecessor: Garth Norman

Orders
- Ordination: 1979 (deacon); 1980 (priest) by David Say

Personal details
- Born: 12 February 1954 (age 72)
- Denomination: Anglican
- Parents: Cecil & Bessie
- Spouse: Jill (m. 1981)
- Children: 3
- Education: King's College London

Paul Wright (born 12 February 1954) is a British retired Anglican priest who served as the Archdeacon of Bromley & Bexley (in the Church of England Diocese of Rochester), 2003–2022.

== Education and family ==
Paul Wright was born on 12 February 1954, to Cecil Edwin John Wright and Bessie Wright. After leaving school, he joined the Metropolitan Police Service and then worked in banking. After four years working for an international bank, he left to study theology at King's College London. He graduated in 1978 with a Bachelor of Divinity (BD) degree and the Associateship of King's College (AKC). From 1978 to 1979, he attended Ripon College Cuddesdon to trained for ordained ministry. He later continued his studies, graduating with a Master of Theology (MTh) degree from Heythrop College, London in 1990, and a Doctor of Ministry (DMin) degree from the University of Wales, Lampeter in 2009.

He married Jill Rayner in 1981 and they have three children; Wright became a Fellow of the Royal Society of Arts (FRSA) in 2016.

== Ministry ==
He was made a deacon at Petertide 1979 (24 June) and ordained a priest the Petertide next (22 June 1980) by David Say, Bishop of Rochester, at Rochester Cathedral. He served curacies at St George's Church, Beckenham (1979–1983) and in Richmond (St Mary Magdalene, St Matthias and St John the Divine; 1983–1985), where he was chaplain of Christ's School.

Wright became Vicar of Gillingham, Kent (St Augustine) in 1985, until his move to Crayford in 1990, where he served as Rector until 1999: while there, he was additionally Rural Dean of Erith (1993–1997) and an honorary canon of Rochester Cathedral since 1998. He next served as Vicar of Sidcup until his collation in December 2003 as Archdeacon of Bromley & Bexley. In that role, he has also additionally been Bishop's Adviser for Inter-Faith Concerns (2011–2015), priest-in-charge of Bromley Common (2012–2015) and of St Augustine, Slade Green (2016–2019).

Wright retired effective 31 March 2022; a farewell service was held at Rochester Cathedral on 20 February 2022.

Church of England titles
Preceded by Garth Norman	Archdeacon of Bromley & Bexley; 2003–2022	TBA
