= David Gerard =

David Gerard may refer to:

- Dave Gerard (cartoonist) (1909–2003), American cartoonist
- Dave Gerard (baseball) (1936–2001), baseball player
- David Gérard (born 1977), French rugby union player
- David Gerard (author) (born 1967), Australian-British author

== See also ==
- Dave Gerrard (born 1945), New Zealand swimmer
- David Gerrard (priest) (born 1939), Anglican priest
- David Garrard (born 1978), American football quarterback
- David Garrard (property developer) (born 1939), British property developer
- Gerard David (c. 1460–1523), Dutch painter
- Gérard David (born 1944), Belgian cyclist
