= Ivor Davies =

Ivor Davies may refer to:

- Ivor Davies (politician) (1915–1986), British Liberal Party member and parliamentary candidate
- Ivor Davies (artist) (born 1935), Welsh artist
- Ivor Davies (priest) (1917–1992), British priest and Archdeacon of Lewisham
- Ivor Davies (rugby, born 1906) (1906–1963), Welsh rugby union and rugby league footballer who played in the 1930s
- Ivor Davies (rugby union, born 1892) (1892–1959), Welsh international rugby union player
- Ifor Davies (1910–1982), Welsh Labour Party politician
- Real name of Ivor Novello (1893–1951), Welsh actor, playwright and composer
- Ivor R. Davies (1901–1967), English organist and composer of church anthems
