= Garth Norman =

- Born: 26 November 1938
- Died: 17 November 2023 (aged 84)
- Education: Henry Mellish Grammar School, Durham University, The University of East Anglia and The University of Cambridge
- Known for: British Clergyman

The Ven Garth Norman (26 November 1938 - 17 November 2023) was Archdeacon of Bromley & Bexley from 1994 until 2003.

He was educated at Henry Mellish Grammar School, Durham University (BA, DipTh, MA), the University of East Anglia (MEd) and the University of Cambridge (PGCE). He was ordained in 1964.

He served his title at St Anne's Church, Wandsworth and Trunch with Swafield (1966–71), after which he was Team Rector in the Trunch Team Ministry (1971–83) and Rural Dean of Repps (1975–83).

After that he was Principal of the Chiltern Christian Training Scheme in the Diocese of Oxford from 1983 to 1988 as well as Assistant Curate of West Wycombe with Bledlow Ridge, Bradenham and Radnage (1983–87); and then Director of Training in the Diocese of Rochester from 1988 until his archdeaconal appointment.

In retirement he was Southwell & Nottingham Diocesan Chaplain to Retired Clergy (2004–09).

Norman died on 17 November 2023 in Cambridgeshire, aged 84.

Church of England titles
Preceded by Edward Francis	Archdeacon of Bromley; 1994–2003	Succeeded by Paul Wright
