= Ivor Davies (priest) =

British Anglican priest (1917–1992)

Ivor Gordon Davies (21 July 1917 – 27 June 1992) was an Anglican priest who was the Archdeacon of Lewisham between 1972 and 1985.

Educated at the University of Wales, where he took a Second in Greats in 1939; and at the University of London (Bachelor of Divinity, 1951), Davies prepared for ordination at St Stephen's House, Oxford, being ordained deacon in 1941 and priest in 1942 for the Diocese of Llandaff. Following a three-year period as Curate at St Paul, Grangetown, Cardiff, he served between 1944 and 1947 as a chaplain to the forces before returning to parish work as Curate of St John the Baptist, Felixstowe between 1947 and 1949. Appointed Perpetual Curate (a title effectively identical to vicar) of St Thomas’, Ipswich in that year, he subsequently became a Residentiary Canon at Southwark Cathedral in 1957; serving as Diocesan Canon Missioner until his appointment as Archdeacon of Lewisham.

Ivor Davies served under three Bishops of Southwark, and was a key figure in the diocese during the episcopate of Mervyn Stockwood, whose tenure saw many changes and developments in theology and theological training, particularly during the 1960s when Southwark became known as the centre of the ferment which was nicknamed "South Bank Religion". Although himself an Anglo-Catholic in formation and in churchmanship, his early association with the Church in Wales Catholic wing seems to have become modified during his subsequent career in the Church of England, and he became a friend and associate of Honest to God author John AT Robinson during that prelate's time as Bishop of Woolwich. Indeed, Davies is credited with doing much to develop initiatives in pastoral care of the sick - and in modernising approaches to spiritual counselling, measures that would later be taken up by Robinson and others in due course.

Shortly after his retirement, he summed up the Stockwood and Robinson period in a way that also cast light on his own approach to ministry.

John (Robinson) and Mervyn (Stockwood) were a duo of the same creative mould, and under their combined leadership the Diocese (of Southwark) experienced one of the most constructive periods of its life. They were turbulent days, and I received many letters expressing great unease from those who were unsettled by what was being written and done. But I knew from personal contact with John that he had the heart of the Gospel in him and the disturbance for me was a challenge to be faced...What John did was to nudge me carefully but clearly into the acceptance of new ways of working, and several areas of diocesan life which were earlier part of my brief as Missioner were put by John under new management.

For instance, I introduced into the diocese seminars on Clinical Theology and Pastoral Counselling...He took the initiative of appointing a specialist to be full time in promoting this field of ministry. I started courses for churchwardens and parochial church council members and was in on lay training generally. John saw the need for greater specialisation...

I count myself among those who feel greatly indebted to him. His life and work were inspirational to the very end"

— James, Eric, 1987. A Life of Bishop John AT Robinson, Scholar, Pastor, Prophet, London, Fount

Following his retirement, Archdeacon Davies retired to Felixstowe, holding permission to officiate in the Diocese of St Edmundsbury and Ipswich until his death.

Church of England titles
Preceded by William Samuel Hayman	Archdeacon of Lewisham; 1972–1985	Succeeded by Clifford George Lacey
