= Peter Coombs =

English Anglican priest

Peter Bertram Coombs (30 November 1928 – 22 September 2020) was an English Anglican priest: he was the Archdeacon of Wandsworth from 1975 to 1988; and of Reigate from 1988 to 1995.

Coombs was educated at Reading School and Bristol University. He was a Curate at Christ Church, Beckenham, then Rector of St Nicholas, Nottingham from 1964 to 1968 and after that Vicar of Christ Church, New Malden from 1968 to 1975.

Coombs died on 22 September 2020, at the age of 91.

Church of England titles
Preceded by Reginald Victor Bazire	Archdeacon of Wandsworth; 1975–1988	Succeeded by David Keith Robin Gerrard
Preceded by Bernard Victor Jacob	Archdeacon of Reigate; 1988–1995	Succeeded by Martin James Baddeley
