= Alastair Cutting =

British Church of England priest

The Right Reverend Alastair Cutting
- Bishop of Woolwich
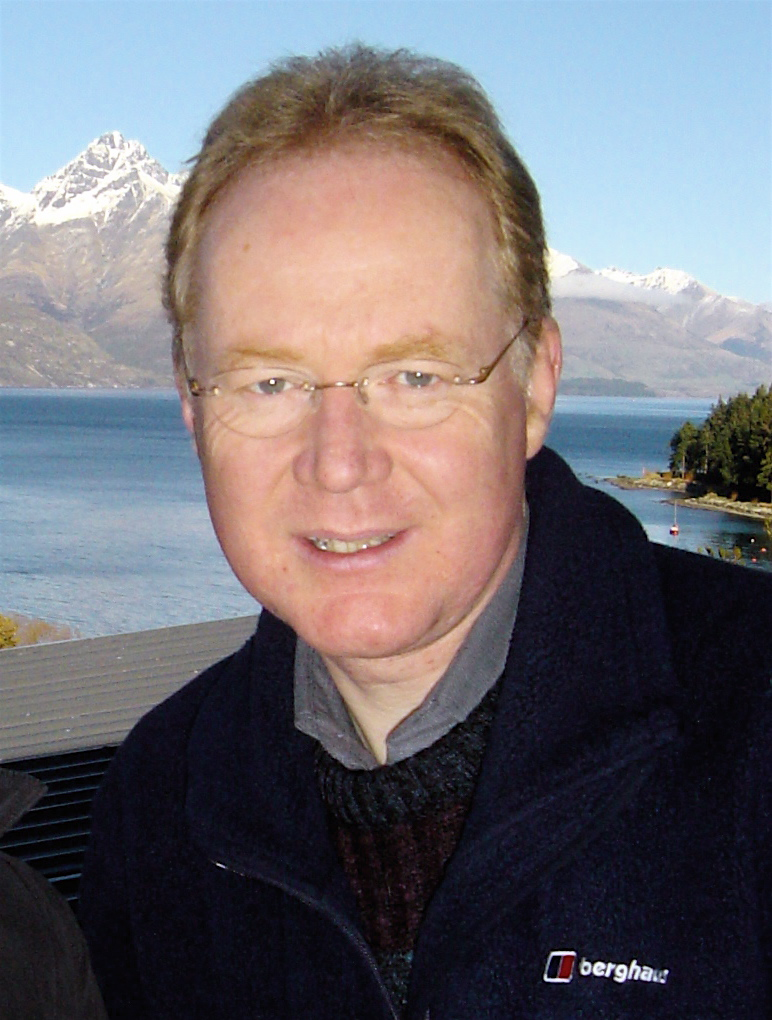
- Cutting in 2006
- Church: Church of England
- Diocese: Diocese of Southwark
- In office: July 2024 to present
- Predecessor: Karowei Dorgu
- Other post: Archdeacon of Lewisham & Greenwich (2013–2024)

Orders
- Ordination: 1987 (deacon); 1988 (priest)
- Consecration: 3 July 2024 by Justin Welby

Personal details
- Born: Alastair Murray Cutting; 29 May 1960 (age 66)
- Denomination: Anglicanism
- Spouse: Kay (m. 1984)
- Children: Two
- Education: George Watson's College; Lushington Boys School; Watford Grammar School for Boys
- Alma mater: Westhill College, University of Birmingham; St John's College, Nottingham; Heythrop College, University of London

Alastair Murray Cutting (born 29 May 1960) is a British Anglican bishop. Since July 2024, he has been Bishop of Woolwich, an area bishop in the Church of England's Diocese of Southwark. From 2013 to 2024, he has served as the Archdeacon of Lewisham & Greenwich. He was consecrated as Bishop of Woolwich on July 3 2024 in Southwark Cathedral.

== Early life and education ==
Cutting was born on 29 May 1960 in Birmingham, England, the son of William Alexander Murray Cutting and his wife, Margaret McLean Cutting, née Manderson. He was educated in three different countries: at George Watson's College, a private school in Edinburgh, Scotland; at Lushington Boys School, a private international Christian school in Ootacamund, India; and at Watford Grammar School for Boys, a state comprehensive school in Watford, England. He grew up in South India where his parents worked at a rural hospital and "where four generations of his family lived and worked for nearly a century".

Cutting took a gap year between school and university, during which he worked with the Salvation Army in South India. He then returned to England, working as a science laboratory technician at a school. In 1980 he studied teaching and youth work at Westhill College, (now part of University of Birmingham). He graduated in 1983 with a Bachelor of Education (BEd) degree. From 1983 to 1984, he worked with The Ambassador's Roadshow, a Christian drama and music team working in churches and schools across South England. In 1984, he entered St John's College, Nottingham, an Open Evangelical Anglican theological college to study theology and train for ordination. During this time, he completed a Licentiate of Theology (LTh) and a Diploma in Pastoral Studies (DPS).

While undertaking parish ministry in the Diocese of Chichester, Cutting studied at Heythrop College, University of London. He graduated with a Master of Arts (MA) degree in 2003. His master's thesis concerned Maori and Celtic spirituality.

== Ordained ministry ==
Cutting was ordained in the Church of England as a deacon in 1987 and as a priest in 1988. He served his curacy in the Diocese of Sheffield at All Saints Church, Woodlands from 1987 to 1988, and then at Wadsley Parish Church from 1989 to 1991. From 1991 to 1996, he was Chaplain to The Nave and Uxbridge Town Centre, and an assistant curate in the Uxbridge Team Ministry in the Diocese of London.

In 1996, Cutting moved to the Diocese of Chichester where he took up his first incumbency as Vicar of St John the Evangelist, Copthorne, West Sussex. After 14 years, in 2010, he moved parishes and became Rector of the Benefice of St Peter's Church, Henfield with Shermanbury and Woodmancote, West Sussex. In 2011, he was elected Pro-Prolocutor of the Province of Canterbury of the General Synod in addition to his parish ministry until 2013, and again elected as Pro-Prolocutor in 2022.

In December 2012, he was announced as the next Archdeacon of Lewisham & Greenwich in the Diocese of Southwark. On 14 April 2013, he was instituted and installed as archdeacon during a service at Southwark Cathedral. The Archdeaconry of Lewisham & Greenwich covers the area deaneries of Lewisham, East Lewisham, Charlton, Eltham and Mottingham, Plumstead, West Lewisham, and Deptford. He was also priest-in-charge of Holy Trinity with St Augustine, Sydenham, between 2015 and 2019.

=== Episcopal ministry ===
On 6 June 2024, it was announced that he was to become the next Bishop of Woolwich, the area bishop over his former archdeaconry. On 3 July, he was consecrated as a bishop by Justin Welby, Archbishop of Canterbury, during a service at Southwark Cathedral; Dr Elaine Storkey was the preacher.

=== Views ===
Cutting is an Evangelical Anglican.

== Personal life ==
In 1984, Cutting married Kay Elizabeth Greenhalgh. Together they have two daughters.
