= Robert Joynt =

Robert Charles Joynt (14 April 1856 – 19 April 1938) was an Anglican priest and author.

Joynt was born at Coolbanagher and educated at Trinity College, Dublin. He was ordained in 1881 and began his career as a curate at Darnall. He held incumbencies at St George's Sheffield, Christ Church, Gipsy Hill and Holy Trinity Redhill. He was Archdeacon of Kingston-upon-Thames from 1919 to 1931; and Chancellor of Southwark Cathedral from 1933 to 1936.

Church of England titles
Preceded by William Woodcock Hough	Archdeacon of Southwark; 1919–1931	Succeeded by George Henry Marten
