= Percy Robb =

Percy Douglas Robb (7 August 1902 – 28 November 1976) was an Anglican priest: he was the Archdeacon of Kingston-upon-Thames from 1953 until 1976.

Richardson was educated at Bedford School and Pembroke College, Oxford and ordained in 1927. Following a curacy in Lambeth he was: Rector of St Paul with St Mark, Deptford (1931–44); Rural Dean of Greenwich (1941–44); Vicar of St Mary, Lewisham, (1944–55); Vicar of St Andrew's, Coulsdon, 1955–63; and Proctor in Convocation of Southwark, (1953–75).

Church of England titles
Preceded by Nicol Keith Anderson	Archdeacon of Kingston-upon-Thames; 1953–1976	Succeeded by Bernard Victor Jacob
