= Moira Astin =

British Anglican priest

The Right Reverend Moira Astin
- Bishop of Crediton
- Church: Church of England
- Diocese: Diocese of Exeter
- In office: 2025 to present
- Predecessor: Jackie Searle
- Previous post: Archdeacon of Reigate (2016 to 2025)

Orders
- Ordination: 1995 (deacon); 1996 (priest)
- Consecration: 3 July 2025 by Sarah Mullally

Personal details
- Born: Moira Anne Elizabeth Williams; 18 February 1965 (age 61)
- Denomination: Anglicanism
- Education: Clare College, Cambridge; Wycliffe Hall, Oxford

Moira Anne Elizabeth Astin (née Williams; born 18 February 1965) is a British Anglican bishop. She has been Bishop of Crediton in the Church of England's Diocese of Exeter since 2025.

== Early life and education ==
Astin was born on 18 February 1965, and grew up in Staines, Surrey. She was educated at City of London School for Girls and Sir William Perkins's School, Chertsey, Surrey; both all-girls independent schools. She studied Natural Sciences (specialising in geology) at Clare College, Cambridge, and graduated with a Bachelor of Arts (BA) degree in 1986. She then worked in computing, before training for ordained ministry at Wycliffe Hall, Oxford. She went on to graduate with a BA degree from the University of Oxford in 1996.

== Ordained ministry ==
Astin was ordained in the Church of England as a deacon in 1995 and as a priest in 1996. She was a curate at St Nicolas, Newbury from 1995 to 1999; Team Vicar of Thatcham from 1999 to 2005; Vicar, St James, Woodley from 2005 to 2011; and Vicar of Frodingham with New Brumby from 2011 until her appointment as archdeacon. She was the Archdeacon of Reigate in the Church of England since 30 October 2016 until 2025.

On 3 June 2025, it was announced that she had been nominated to be the next Bishop of Crediton, one of the suffragan bishops in the Diocese of Exeter. On 3 July 2025, she was consecrated as a bishop by Sarah Mullally, Bishop of London (and former Bishop of Crediton), during a service at St Paul's Cathedral. She was installed as Bishop of Crediton during a service at Exeter Cathedral on 6 July 2025.

Church of England titles
Preceded by Danny Kajumba	Archdeacon of Reigate; 2016 to 2025	Succeeded by TBC
Preceded by Jackie Searle	Bishop of Crediton; 2025 to present	Incumbent
