= John Richardson (Archdeacon of Southwark) =

John Richardson (1817–1904) was an Anglican priest: he was the Archdeacon of Southwark from 1882 until his death on 19 March 1904.

Richardson was educated at Trinity College, Dublin and ordained in 1843. Following a curacy at Haslingden he held incumbencies in Musbury, Milnsbridge, Manchester and Bury St Edmunds before becoming Vicar of Camden Church, Camberwell in 1874.

Church of England titles
Preceded by Samuel Cheetham	Archdeacon of Southwark; 1882–1904	Succeeded by Samuel Mumford Taylor
