= John Leek =

John Leek may refer to:

- John Leek (priest) (died 1369), Canon of Windsor
- John Leek (died c.1415), MP for Nottinghamshire
- John Leek (died c.1449), MP for Nottinghamshire

== See also ==
- John Leak, VC recipient
- John Leake (disambiguation)
- John Leeke, Anglican bishop
