= John Leake (disambiguation) =

John Leake (1656–1720) was an English flag officer and politician.

John Leake may also refer to:

- John Leake (American football) (born 1981)
- John Leake (cinematographer) (1927–2009), Australian cinematographer
- John Leake (NAAFI manager) (1949–2000), English recipient of the Distinguished Service Medal
- John George Leake (1752–1827), lawyer who founded the Leake and Watts Children's Home

== See also ==
- John Leak, Victoria Cross recipient
- John Leek (disambiguation)
- John Leeke, Anglican bishop
