= Richard Knowling =

Richard John Knowling, DD (1851 – 4 July 1919) was the Chaplain of King's College London, canon of Durham and professor of divinity at Durham University.

== Early life ==
Richard John Knowling was born in Devonport, England and educated at Blundell's School in Tiverton and at Balliol College in Oxford. After taking Honours in Lit.Hum and theology, he was appointed classical master at Abingdon School in 1874. In 1875 Knowling was ordained deacon and from 1878 to 1879 served as curate of Wellington in Somerset, where his father, Prebendary Knowling, was vicar.

== Later career ==
From 1878 Knowling spent six years as curate at St Martin-in-the-Fields and in 1884 began a connection with King's College London (which continued until his appointment in 1905 as canon of Durham Cathedral and professor of divinity at Durham University). Beginning as censor and lecturer, he became vice principal of King's College in 1890 and professor of New Testament exegesis in 1894. In 1903 Knowling was appointed examining chaplain to the Archbishop of Canterbury and the Bishop of Exeter. Knowling married Miss Ellen Raban in 1893 and died a widower in Torquay in 1919.

Knowling's publications included The Witness of the Epistles (1892), but his main period of writing was from 1901 onwards. In addition to original work he contributed to the content on The Acts of the Apostles in the Expositors Greek Testament and the Epistle of St James in the Westminster Commentaries, whilst also contributing to the Dictionary of Christ and the Gospels and the Dictionary of Christian Biography.

== Publications ==
- The Witness of the Epistles; A Study in Modern Criticism (1892)
- Epistle of Saint James (1904)
- Our Lord's Virgin Birth: And the Criticism of To-day (1904)
- The Testimony of St. Paul to Christ Viewed in Some of Its Aspects (1905)
- Literary Criticism and the New Testament (1907)
- Messianic Interpretation and Other Studies (1910)

== Sources ==
- Obituary of Canon R. J. Knowling, The Times, 7 July 1919 (pg. 16; Issue 42145; col F)
