= List of chaplains of King's College London =

The Chaplain of King's College London is a Church of England minister based at the College's main Strand campus. Since the College has expanded to other campuses, each with their own chaplains, the senior is referred to as the College Chaplain.

== Chaplains of King's College ==
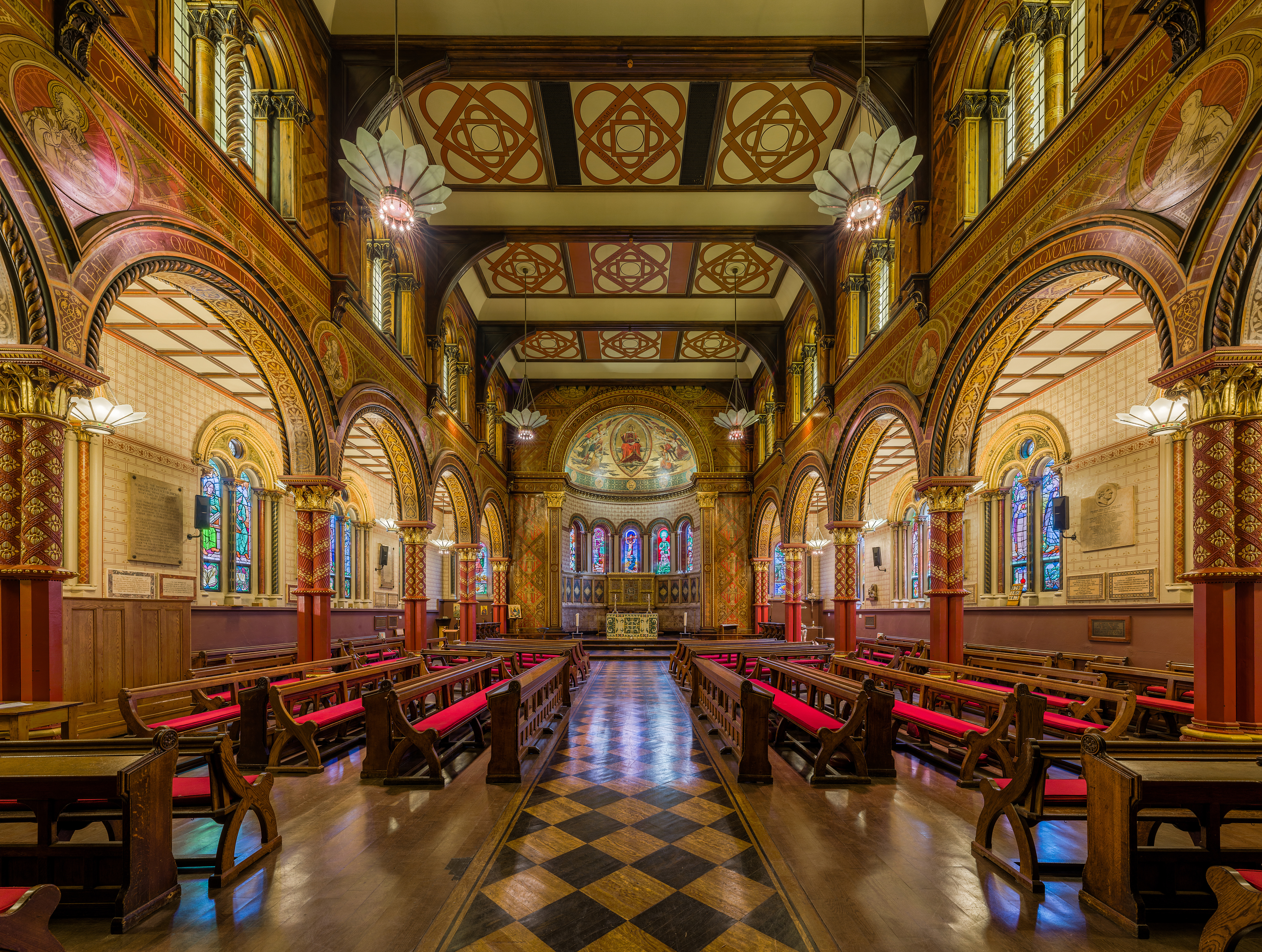
The Grade I listed College Chapel on the Strand Campus was redesigned in 1864 by Sir George Gilbert Scott

- Henry Moseley (1831–1834)
- John Allen (1834–1846)
- Edward Plumptre (1846–1869)
- Evelyn Joseph Hone (1869–1870)
- Donald Campbell (1870–1875)
- Henry Watkins (1875–1878)
- Charles James Ball (1878–1879)
- Charles Mackarness (1879–1880)
- George Daniell (1880–1884)
- Richard Knowling (1884–1885)
- Harold Smith (1885–1897)
- George Newsom (1897–1903)
- Stanley Charles Edmund Legg (1903–1919)
- Richard Hanson (1919–1924)
- Clement Rogers (1924–1932)
- Eric Abbott (1932–1936)
- Robert Linton Shields (1936–1945)
- Sydney Evans (1945–1948)
- Frank Coventry (1948–1953)
- John Churchill (1953–1960)
- Peter Coleman (1960–1966)
- David Geoffrey Martin (1966–1970)
- Richard John Kingsbury (1970–1976)
- Colin Slee (1976–1982)
- Christopher John Everard Moody (1982–1988)
- Philip Chester (1988–1995)
- Tim Ditchfield (1995–present)
