= William Hayman =

William Samuel Hayman (3 June 1903 – 7 February 1993) was an Anglican priest: he was the Archdeacon of Lewisham from 1960 to 1972.

Hayman was educated at Merchant Taylors' School, Northwood and St John's College, Oxford. He was ordained in 1927 and began his career as a curate at St Matthew, Brixton. He was Priest in charge of St Mark, Wimbledon then held incumbencies in Finstall and Cheam.

Church of England titles
Preceded by Laurie Brown	Archdeacon of Lewisham; 1960–1972	Succeeded by Ivor Davies
