= Henry Moseley (mathematician) =

English churchman, mathematician, and scientist

Henry Moseley (9 July 1801 – 20 January 1872) was an English churchman, mathematician, and scientist.

== Biography ==
The son of Dr. William Willis Moseley, who kept a school at Newcastle-under-Lyme, and his wife Margaret (née Jackson according to published sources, but genealogical evidence is that her maiden name was Robins), he was born on 9 July 1801. He was sent at an early age to the grammar school there, and when fifteen or sixteen to a school at Abbeville. Later he attended, for a short time, a naval school in Portsmouth.

In 1819 Moseley went to St John's College, Cambridge. He graduated B.A. in 1826, coming out seventh wrangler, and proceeded M.A. in 1836. In 1870 he was given an honorary degree of LL.D.

Moseley was ordained deacon in 1827 and priest in 1828, and became curate at West Monkton, near Taunton. On 20 January 1831 he was appointed Professor of Natural and Experimental Philosophy and Astronomy at King's College, London. He held the post till 12 January 1844, when he was appointed one of the first of H. M. inspectors of normal schools. He was also chaplain of King's College from 31 October 1831 to 8 November 1833. As one of the jurors of the International Exhibition of 1851 he came to know Albert, Prince Consort. In 1853 he was presented to a residential canonry in Bristol Cathedral; in 1854 he became vicar of Olveston in Gloucestershire, and was appointed chaplain in ordinary to the Queen in 1855.

Moseley was elected a Fellow of the Royal Society in February 1839. He was also a corresponding member of the Institute of France, a member of the Council of Military Education, and vice-president of the Institution of Naval Architects. He died at Olveston 20 January 1872.

== Works ==
While at Portsmouth Moseley wrote his first paper, "On measuring the Depth of the Cavities seen on the Surface of the Moon" (in Tilloch's Philosophical Magazine lii. 1818). His first book was A Treatise on Hydrostatics, Cambridge, 1830.

Moseley's main works were:

- Lectures on Astronomy, delivered as professor at King's College (London, 1839, 4th edit. 1854);
- the article "Definite Integrals" in the Encyclopædia Metropolitana, 1837; and
- The Mechanical Principles of Engineering and Architecture (London, 1843, 2nd edit. 1855). It was reprinted in America with notes by Dennis Hart Mahan for the use at West Point, and translated into German by Hermann Scheffler.

Formulas published by Moseley became standard for calculations of the dynamical stability of warships. This work first appeared in a memoir On the Dynamical Stability and on the Oscillations of Floating Bodies, read before the Royal Society, and published in Philosophical Transactions in 1850.

Moseley also published:

- Syllabus of a Course of Experimental Lectures on the Theory of Equilibrium, London, 1831.
- A Treatise on Mechanics, applied to the Arts, including Statics and Hydrostatics, London, 1834; 3rd edit. 1847.
- Illustrations of Mechanics, London, 1839.
- Theoretical and Practical Papers on Bridges, London, 1843 (Weale's Series, 'Bridges,' vol. i.)
- Astro-Theology, 2nd edit. London, 1851, 3rd edit. 1860; this first appeared in a series of articles in the Church of England Magazine for 1838. From a review of the third edition: "The chief object of this popular and interesting volume is to treat of those evidences of the wisdom and goodness of God which may be seen in the daily changes of the heavens".

Around 35 papers on natural philosophy written by Moseley appeared in the Philosophical Magazine, the Transactions of the Cambridge Philosophical Society, the Philosophical Transactions, the British Association Reports, and other journals. The observed motion of the lead on the roof of Bristol Cathedral, under changes of temperature, caused him to advance the theory that the motion of glaciers might be explained in the same way.

== Family ==
Moseley married, on 23 April 1835, Harriet, daughter of William Nottidge of Wandsworth Common, Surrey. Henry Nottidge Moseley was their son.

== See also ==
- Astrotheology

== Notes ==
- This article incorporates text from a publication now in the public domain: Lee, Sidney, ed. (1894). "Moseley, Henry (1801-1872)". Dictionary of National Biography. Vol. 39. London: Smith, Elder & Co.
