= Stephen Roberts (priest) =

British Anglican priest

Stephen John Roberts (born 6 December 1958) is a British Anglican priest. From 2015 to 2020 he was deputy diocesan secretary in the Diocese of Southwark He was the Archdeacon of Wandsworth from 2005 to 2015. He was made an honorary canon of Southwark Cathedral in September 2015.

Roberts was educated at Newcastle-under-Lyme High School and King's College London. Following training at Westcott House, Cambridge, he served as a curate at St Mary's Riverhead with St John's Dunton Green and then at St Martin-in-the-Fields. After this he was vicar of St George's Camberwell followed by 11 years as warden of the Trinity College Centre in Peckham. From 2000 to 2005 he was canon treasurer of Southwark Cathedral and senior director of ordinands for the Diocese of Southwark.

It was announced on 21 April 2015 that Roberts was to resign his archdeaconry, effective 1 September, in order to become deputy diocesan secretary. He retired in 2020.

Church of England titles
Preceded by David Gerrard	Archdeacon of Wandsworth; 2004–2015	Succeeded by John Kiddle
