= David Stewart-Smith =

David Cree Stewart-Smith (22 May 1913 – May 2001) was an Anglican priest.

He was educated at Marlborough, King's College, Cambridge and Ripon College Cuddesdon. He was ordained in 1941 and began his ministry with curacies in Northampton and Cheltenham. He was then Vicar choral and Sacrist at York Minster from 1944 to 1949; Vicar of Shadwell, Leeds from 1949 to 1952; Warden of Brasted Place College from 1952 to 1963; Dean of St. George's Cathedral, Jerusalem and Administrator of St. George's College, Jerusalem from 1964 to 1968; Archdeacon of Bromley from 1968 to 1969; and Archdeacon of Rochester from 1969 until 1976.

== Notes ==
Church of England titles
Preceded by David Halsey	Archdeacon of Bromley; 1968–1969	Succeeded by Herbert Wallace Cragg
Preceded by Walter Marshall Browne	Archdeacon of Rochester; 1969–1976	Succeeded by Derek Palmer
