= Henry Nottidge Moseley =

British medic and naturalist

Henry Nottidge Moseley FRS (14 November 1844 – 10 November 1891) was a British naturalist who sailed on the global scientific expedition of HMS Challenger in 1872 through 1876.

== Life ==
Moseley was born in Wandsworth, London, the son of Henry Moseley. He was educated at Harrow School, at Exeter College, Oxford (Arts) and at the University of London (medicine). He married Amabel Gwyn Jeffreys, daughter of the conchologist John Gwyn Jeffreys, in 1881, and they were the parents of the noted British physicist Henry Gwyn Jeffreys Moseley.

Moseley delivered the Royal Society Croonian Lecture in 1878 and was elected as a Fellow of the Royal Society in 1879. He participated as naturalist in expeditions to Ceylon, to California, and to Oregon, and most notably he was in the Challenger expedition aboard HMS Challenger of 1872 through 1876 which covered over 120,000 km (74,565 mi) of the world's oceans. Moseley began working at the University of London in 1879, and he was awarded the Linacre chair of human and comparative anatomy at Merton College, Oxford in 1881. In the same year, Moseley became involved in the negotiations for the donation of the Pitt-Rivers donation, which would form the Pitt Rivers Museum from 1884. Moseley, with Edward Burnett Tylor, oversaw the transfer of Pitt-Rivers' collection from London to Oxford

Moseley exerted significant influences on his noted students Halford Mackinder and Walter Garstang, who changed his career choice from medicine to zoology under Moseley's supervision. Moseley was awarded the Royal Society's Royal Medal in 1887.

Moseley's publications include :

- On Oregon (1878).
- On the Structure of the Sylasteridae (1878).
- Notes by a Naturalist on the Challenger (1879).

Moseley studied invertebrate biology and the phylogeny of arthropods, coral, and molluscs.

Moseley is commemorated in the Latin name of the species, northern rockhopper penguin, the Eudyptes moseleyi.

== See also ==
- European and American voyages of scientific exploration
