= Herbert Cragg =

Herbert Wallace Cragg (18 November 1910 – 27 July 1980) was an Anglican priest and author.

He was educated at St John's College, Durham and ordained in 1934. After curacies in Liverpool and Cheadle he held incumbencies in Blackburn, Carlisle and Beckenham He was Archdeacon of Bromley from 1969 to 1978.

Church of England titles
Preceded by David Cree Stewart-Smith	Archdeacon of Bromley; 1969–1978	Succeeded by Edward Reginald Francis
