= Jackie Searle =

British Anglican bishop

The Right Reverend Jackie Searle
- Acting Bishop of Derby
- Church: Church of England
- Diocese: Diocese of Derby
- In office: May 2026–present
- Predecessor: Sarah Mullally
- Successor: Moira Astin
- Previous posts: Bishop of Crediton (2018–2025); Archdeacon of Gloucester (2012–2018)

Orders
- Ordination: 1992 (deacon); 1994 (priest)
- Consecration: 27 September 2018 by John Sentamu

Personal details
- Born: 26 September 1960 (age 66)
- Denomination: Anglicanism
- Spouse: David Runcorn (m. 1992)
- Children: two

Jacqueline Ann "Jackie" Searle (born 26 September 1960) is a British Anglican bishop. From 2018 until 2025, she served as the Bishop of Crediton, a suffragan bishop of the Diocese of Exeter. She had previously been the Archdeacon of Gloucester between 2012 and 2018. Since May 2026, she has been serving as Acting Bishop of Derby in the Diocese of Derby.

== Early life and education ==
Searle was born on 26 September 1960 in Redhill, Surrey, England. She was educated at Talbot Heath School, an all-girls private school in Bournemouth. She studied at Whitelands College, Roehampton, graduating with a Bachelor of Education (BEd) degree in 1982. She worked as a teacher from 1982 until 1989. She trained for ordained ministry at Trinity College, Bristol, an evangelical Anglican theological college between 1990 and 1992.

== Ordained ministry ==
She was ordained deacon in 1992, and priest in 1994. Her first ecclesiastical post was as parish deacon in the benefice of Christ Church and St Peter, Roxeth from 1992 to 1994, and as an assistant curate at St Stephen's Church, Ealing from 1994 to 1996, both in the Diocese of London. From 1996 to 2003, she was a tutor in applied theology and dean of women at Trinity College, Bristol, her alma mater. She was then Vicar of St Peter, Littleover from 2003 to 2012 in the Diocese of Derby. From 2012, she served as Archdeacon of Gloucester in the Diocese of Gloucester and as a residentiary canon of Gloucester Cathedral.

=== Episcopal ministry ===
In July 2018, it was announced that she would be the next Bishop of Crediton, a suffragan bishop in the Diocese of Exeter. On 27 September 2018, she was consecrated a bishop by John Sentamu, the Archbishop of York, during a service at Southwark Cathedral. She was welcomed into the diocese on 14 October.

Since the retirement of Robert Atwell as Bishop of Exeter in September 2023, Searle has served as Acting Bishop of Exeter. In September 2024, she announced her intention to retire as Bishop of Crediton in January 2025.

=== Views ===
In 2023, in a pastoral letter from the bishops of the Diocese of Exeter (including Searle), it was stated that they welcome "the proposed prayers of thanksgiving, dedication and God's blessing for same sex couples": this was in reaction to the Living in Love and Faith process that concluded with the suggestion that the Church of England would introduce a service of blessing for same sex couples.

In November 2023, she was one of 44 Church of England bishops who signed an open letter supporting the use of the Prayers of Love and Faith (i.e. blessings for same-sex couples) and called for "Guidance being issued without delay that includes the removal of all restrictions on clergy entering same-sex civil marriages, and on bishops ordaining and licensing such clergy".

== Personal life ==
In 1992, Searle married David Runcorn. Together they have two children. David is also ordained in the Church of England.

Church of England titles
Preceded by Geoffrey Sidaway	Archdeacon of Gloucester; 2012–2018	Succeeded by Hilary Dawson
Preceded by Sarah Mullally	Bishop of Crediton; 2018–2025	Succeeded by {{{after}}}
