= Edward Francis (priest) =

Edward Reginald Francis (known as Ted Francis) (31 January 1929 – 16 May 2004) was Archdeacon of Bromley from 1979 to 1994.

He was educated at Dover Grammar School for Boys. He trained for ordination at Rochester Theological College and was ordained in 1961. After a curacy in Frindsbury he was Vicar of Chatham then Rural Dean of Rochester He was Archdeacon of Bromley from 1969 to 1978.

Church of England titles
Preceded by Herbert Wallace Cragg	Archdeacon of Bromley; 1979–1994	Succeeded by Garth Norman
