= Dick Bird =

British priest (1933–2010)

Colin Richard Bateman Bird (31 March 1933 – 2 June 2010) was a British Anglican priest in the late 20th and early 21st centuries.

== Biography ==
Bird was born on 31 March 1933. He was educated at Selwyn College, Cambridge, and ordained in 1958. His first posts were curacies at St Mark's Cathedral, George and St Saviour's Claremont, Cape Town since 1996. He then held incumbencies in Pretoria and Tzaneen. On his return to England he was Curate at Limpsfield then Vicar of St Catherine, Hatcham. In 1988 he became Archdeacon of Lambeth, a post he held for 11 years. He died on 2 June 2010.

== Notes ==
Church of England titles
Preceded by Charles Pinder	Archdeacon of Lambeth; 1988–1999	Succeeded by Nick Baines
