= Derek Palmer (priest) =

Archdeacon of Rochester

Derek George Palmer (24 January 1928 – 20 March 2002) was an Anglican priest, most notably Archdeacon of Rochester and Canon Residential of Rochester Cathedral from 1977 to 1983.

Palmer was educated at Selwyn College, Cambridge, and Wells Theological College. He was ordained in 1953 and began his ministry as Priest in charge of the Good Shepherd, Bristol. He held incumbencies at Hartcliffe and Christ Church, Swindon (1968 - 1977) before his time as Archdeacon; and Dronfield afterwards. He was an Honorary Chaplain to the Queen from 1990 to 1998.

== Notes ==
Church of England titles
Preceded by David Stewart-Smith	Archdeacon of Rochester; 1977–1983	Succeeded by Michael Turnbull
