= Michael Turnbull (bishop) =

English Anglican bishop (born 1935)

The Right Reverend Michael Turnbull CBE
- Bishop of Durham
- Diocese: Durham
- In office: 1994–2003
- Predecessor: David Jenkins
- Successor: N. T. Wright
- Other posts: Honorary assistant bishop in Canterbury, Rochester & Europe (2003–present)
- Previous post: Bishop of Rochester (1988–1994)

Orders
- Ordination: 1960 (deacon); 1961 (priest)
- Consecration: 29 September 1988

Personal details
- Born: 27 December 1935 (age 90) Wombwell, West Riding of Yorkshire
- Denomination: Anglican
- Spouse: Brenda
- Children: 3
- Education: Keble College, Oxford; St John's College, Durham

Member of the House of Lords
- Lord Spiritual
- Ex officio as Bishop of Durham; 29 November 1994 – 30 April 2003

Anthony Michael Arnold Turnbull CBE (born 27 December 1935) is a retired Church of England bishop. He was ordained in 1961 and in 1988 he was consecrated as the Bishop of Rochester. In 1994, he became the Bishop of Durham until he retired in 2003. In his retirement, Turnbull continues "preaching and teaching and writing".

== Education ==
Turnbull was born in Wombwell, West Riding of Yorkshire. His early education was in Ilkley Grammar School, a co-educational secondary school in Ilkley, West Yorkshire, England, that specialises in humanities and sciences.

Turnbull studied at Keble College, Oxford, graduating in 1958 with a MA. He prepared for ordained ministry at Cranmer Hall and St John's College, University of Durham, graduating with a Diploma in Theology.

He began his ministry in 1960 as a deacon and curate of Middleton in the Diocese of Manchester.

== Positions as priest ==
Turnbull was ordained priest in 1961 in Manchester Cathedral. As a priest, he held the following positions:

- After ordination to the priesthood, he continued to serve as curate of Middleton in the Diocese of Manchester before moving in 1961 to be curate of Luton with East Hyde in the Diocese of Saint Albans until 1965.
- In 1965, he moved to York to be domestic chaplain to the Archbishop of York Donald Coggan and director of ordinands for the Diocese of York.
- In 1969, he was appointed chaplain to the University of York, a position he held, for part of the time, in conjunction with being rector of nearby Heslington.
- In 1976, he was appointed Chief Secretary of the Church Army.
- In 1984, he was appointed Archdeacon of Rochester and Canon of Rochester Cathedral in Rochester, Medway.

== Positions as bishop ==
As a bishop, Turnbull held the following positions:

=== Bishop of Rochester ===
In 1988, Turnbull was consecrated as the Bishop of Rochester. During his episcopacy, "a major [two year] training programme for local evangelists was established". In a 1994 speech in Church House, Westminster just before his translation to the Diocese of Durham Turnbull was "Asked what he was proudest of among his accomplishments in Rochester, Kent, he replied that the diocese had opened six new churches, and planned to open four more; and that he had set up an order of lay evangelists."

=== Bishop of Durham ===
From 1994 (he was translated on 6 July and enthroned on 22 October) until his retirement in 2003, Turnbull was the Bishop of Durham, the fourth most senior bishop in the Church of England with a seat in the House of Lords. He was active in the House of Lords as the lead bishop on constitutional affairs and was prominent in the movement towards regional government in the North East.

In his 1994 speech in Church House, Westminster just before his translation to Durham Turnbull asserted his belief in the Virgin Birth of Jesus, the Resurrection of Jesus, and in Hell, although maybe not as eternal damnation.

In a 1998 survey of Church of England bishops about "possibility of alien life on other worlds," Turnbull said the discovery of other life could be a positive force. "God created all life. If it were possible to engage with life on other planets it would open our lives to the greater wonders of God's creation."

By 2003, Turnbull had been made an Honorary Fellow of St Chad's College, Durham and awarded honorary doctorates from Durham University (DD) and from the University of Greenwich. In 2003, he was appointed CBE (Commander of the Most Excellent Order of the British Empire) in 2003 for services to the North East and to the Church of England.

As Bishop of Durham, Turnbull led a diocese with 1.4 million members. He was paid a salary of £23,610 a year; he received free accommodation in Auckland Castle; and he was given a Vauxhall Carlton plus chauffeur.

In Durham, Turnbull took the Diocese into a new era of Clergy deployment and pastoral delivery. However, an online magazine reported that Turnbull had presided "over the most catastrophic decline in Church membership and attendance in Durham diocese's modern history while its finances are correspondingly parlous. No diocese in the Church of England has declined more spectacularly in recent years."

For his last four years in Durham, Turnbull was "chairman of the North East Constitutional Assembly, trying to draw up plans for an elected regional assembly".

== Homosexuality issue ==
In his 1994 speech in Church House, Westminster just before his enthronement as bishop of the Diocese of Durham Turnbull was asked what his policy regarding gay clergy would be. He replied that: "An admitted and open lifestyle is incompatible with full-time ministry."

Despite his speaking out against openly homosexual clergy, in 1994 the News of the World reported that the bishop had been convicted of an act of gross indecency with a Yorkshire farmer. The offence occurred on 30 August 1968, as undercover policemen kept watch on public toilets in Hull. On 13 September at Hull magistrates' court, Turnbull, who at the time was chaplain to the Archbishop of York, pleaded guilty and was given a 12-month conditional discharge and ordered to pay costs of £6 6/- (£6.30).

The disclosure of Turnbull's gross indecency conviction came just four weeks before his scheduled enthronement. His past had been known to the archbishops of Canterbury and York, George Carey and Stuart Blanch, to Lord Runcie, the previous archbishop of Canterbury, and to Lord Coggan, whom Turnbull had been serving as chaplain when the offence took place.

According to close associates, Turnbull "seriously considered withdrawing" from his enthronement "when his past was revealed." In his sermon at his enthronement service, Turnbull spoke of the "gravity of sin" and of his "repentance". He told the congregation that he had been "through a private and now public process of repentance", and that he was "deeply sorry" that friends had to share in the consequences of his past. His sermon also touched on the "depth of forgiveness" by many fellow Christians.

Outside the cathedral, the leader of the pressure group OutRage!, Peter Tatchell, and others protested "against what they saw as his hypocrisy".

=== 1995 BBC interview ===
In a 1995 radio interview on the British Broadcasting Corporation (BBC), Turnbull said, "I think the conversation and the process of what the church thinks, believes, decides and disciplines in this area [homosexuality] does need urgent attention." Furthermore, he added, "to be honest, I'm disappointed that three years after the document 'Issues in Human Sexuality' [referring to the 1991 report by the House of Bishops], we haven't got further down the line in exploring this on a wide basis within the church." He said it was premature for individual bishops to accept the idea of clergy living openly in a homosexual relationship, but added, "I do know of many homosexuals — at least of some homosexuals, both clergy and lay people — who are amongst the most gifted and loving and committed people within church life". Asked whether, in view of his experience, a double standard existed within the church concerning clergy dismissed after a similar conviction, Turnbull said he thought it was unfair to compare a situation where a person's ministry had been rebuilt with cases in which the details are unknown. "I could, but I won't, name clergy who are in exactly the same position as me and who have had their ministries rebuilt after some kind of misdemeanour which was untypical, out of character, or who in fact needed help," he said.

== Archbishop's Commission on the Organisation of the Church of England ==
Much of Turnbull's ministry has been England focused on reorganisation of its administrative structures. In 1995, George Carey appointed Turnbull as chair of the Commission on the Organisation of the Church of England with the task of producing a plan to save the Church of England. The commission was given the nickname "Turnbull Commission."

During the December 1995 Church of England Synod, Turnbull, reporting on the work of the commission, proposed a National Council with broad executive powers under the leadership of the archbishops of Canterbury and York. "Leadership, policy direction and strategic and executive responsibility are too fragmented and weak," Turnbull said during the debate. "The church at the national level clearly needs to work better as one body, not as some kind of dismembered jellyfish. Staying as we are and trying to tread water is not an option," he said. Other members of the Synod challenged the proposals as too much centralization. Turnbull's report passed by a vote of 239 to 167. However, the stiff opposition meant that the proposal was revised and returned for further debate in February 1996.

A report on the work and proposals of the commission was published on 1 January 1995 as Working as One Body: The Report of the Archbishops’ Commission on the Organisation of the Church of England with a foreword by the Archbishops and a Preface by Chairman Turnbull.

In the proposal of the Turnbull Commission, "the whole Church of England, money and everything, would have been run by the central committee". But the proposal was not executed. The Church Commissioners remained in existence, and in control of the money. The only reform executed was that he Archbishops' Council was established in 1999 "to co-ordinate, promote, aid and further the mission of the Church of England. It is composed of 19 members and 7 directors whose task is to give a clear sense of direction to the Church nationally and support the Church locally". Turnbull was subsequently appointed Chairman of the Ministry Division of the Archbishops' Council.

In 1995, after the Report of the Turnbull Commission was published, Hugh Craig, a member of the Council of the Church Society and who had served as a Church Commissioner wrote a critical review with the title "The Turnbull Report: An Analysis".

Turnbull's other posts have included member of the Commission on English Cathedrals (1992–94), Vice Chairman of the Central Board of Finance (1990–1998), board member of the Church Commissioners (1989–1998), chairman of the North East Constitutional Convention (1999–2003) and Campaign for English Regions (2000–2003), chairman of the Bible Reading Fellowship (1985–1994) and of the College of Preachers (1990–1998) and the Council of Scargill House (1969–1976).

== Writings ==
=== Books ===
Parish Evangelism: a Practical Resource Book for the Local Church (London: Mowbrays, 1980)
God's Front Line (London: Mowbrays, 1979)
Learning to Pray (London: Mowbray, 1981)
The State of the Church and the Church of the State, Coauthor with Donald McFadyen (Paperback: Darton Longman and Todd, 2012; Digital: Andrews UK Limited, 2012)

=== Contributions to books ===
Working as One Body: The Report of the Archbishops’ Commission on the Organisation of the Church of England (Church House Publishing, 1 January 1995) Preface by Chairman Turnbull.
The Spontaneous Expansion of the Church and the Causes which Hinder it (Cambridge: Lutterworth Press, 2006). Foreword by Bishop Michael Turnbull.
Gordon Kuhrt, Ministry Issues for the Church of England: Mapping the Trends (Church House Publishing, 2001). Chapter 32 "The Parish System" by Michael Turnbull.
John Adair and John Nelson, eds, Creative Church Leadership (Canterbury Press, 2004). Chapter 17 "The Foundation for Church Leadership" by Michael Turnbull.

=== Quoted in book ===
Steven Croft, ed., The Future of the Parish System: Shaping the Church of England for the Twenty-first Century (Church House Publishing, 2010). Contains quotations on page 155 from Turnbull.

Church of England titles
Preceded by Derek Palmer	Archdeacon of Rochester; 1984–1988	Succeeded by Norman Warren
Preceded by David Say	Bishop of Rochester; 1988–1994	Succeeded by Michael Nazir-Ali
Preceded by David Jenkins	Bishop of Durham; 1994–2003	Succeeded by N. T. Wright
