= Havilland Sands =

Havilland Hubert Allport Sands (26 March 1896 – 22 March 1970) was the Archdeacon of Southwark from 1955 to 1966.

Sands was educated at King Edward's School, Birmingham and Oriel College, Oxford. After World War I service with the Royal Warwickshire Regiment he was ordained in 1922. Following a curacy at St John, Waterloo Road he was Priest in charge of All Saints, Windsor from 1930 to 1936 then Vicar of St Anselm's, Kennington Cross for thirty years. He was Rural Dean of Lambeth from 1943 to 1955 and an Honorary Canon of Southwark Cathedral from 1951.

Church of England titles
Preceded by William Percy Gilpin	Archdeacon of Southwark; 1955–1956	Succeeded by Reginald Victor Bazire
