= Reginald McCahearty =

The Ven Reginald George Henry McCahearty (13 June 1902 – 24 June 1966) was the first Archdeacon of Bromley.

He was born in Deal, Kent and educated at the Leeds University and College of the Resurrection, Mirfield and ordained in 1927.incumbencies at Christ Church, Dartford; Christ Church, Milton-next-Gravesend, All Saints, Orpington and St Nicholas, Chislehurst.

Church of England titles
Preceded by Inaugural appointment	Archdeacon of Bromley; 1955–1966	Succeeded by David Halsey
