= Arthur Preston (bishop) =

Anglican bishop (1883–1936)

- Bishop of Woolwich
- Diocese: Diocese of Southwark
- In office: 1932 – 1936 (death)
- Predecessor: William Hough
- Successor: Leslie Lang
- Other posts: Vicar of Lewisham (1924–1933); Canon Residentiary of Southwark Cathedral (1930–1936); Archdeacon of Lewisham (1932–1936); Sub-Dean of Southwark (1933–1936)

Orders
- Ordination: c. 1907
- Consecration: 1932 by Cosmo Gordon Lang

Personal details
- Born: 1883
- Died: 19 July 1936 (aged 52–53) at sea
- Buried: Crowhurst, Surrey, United Kingdom
- Denomination: Anglican
- Parents: Reuben & Frances
- Spouse: Nancy
- Children: 3 daughters Alison, Elizabeth and Valerie
- Education: University College, Oxford

Arthur Llewellyn Preston (1883 – 19 July 1936) was an Anglican bishop who served as the third Bishop of Woolwich (a suffragan bishop in the Diocese of Southwark) from 1932 until his death.

== Birth and education ==
Born in 1883 into a distinguished family — his brother Walter was the Member of Parliament for Mile End then Cheltenham between the wars — to Reuben and Frances Preston, and was educated at Charterhouse and University College, Oxford (he gained an Oxford Master of Arts {MA(Oxon)}). After a period at Oxford House, Bethnal Green, he started ministerial training at Wells Theological College in 1906; he was ordained in 1905.

== Early ministry ==
His title post (first curacy) was at St Mark's, Plumstead, London (1907–1913), after which he was curate at St James the Great, Bethnal Green, London (1913–1917) and then Vicar there (1917–1922). During World War I, he became an army chaplain (1915–1917); he moved from Bethnal Green to become Vicar of St James's Moor Park (Fulham, London; 1922–1924).

== Later ministry ==
Having married Nancy Ward (née Napier) in 1922 — they had three daughters —, from 1924 onwards, he was associated with Lewisham — firstly as Vicar until 1933, and additionally as a much-respected Rural Dean (1930–1932). In 1930, he was appointed a Canon Residentiary of Southwark Cathedral by Richard Parsons, Bishop of Southwark, and, in 1932, Archdeacon of Lewisham and a suffragan bishop of the diocese (as Bishop of Woolwich). He was ordained and consecrated a bishop on St Andrew's Day (30 November) 1932 by Cosmo Gordon Lang, Archbishop of Canterbury, in Southwark Cathedral. In 1933, he became Sub-Dean of the cathedral and his book 'The Parish Priest in his Parish' was published.

== Death and legacy ==
In 1936, he died whilst aboard his brother's yacht. He was buried at Crowhurst, Surrey. At his memorial service he was described by Priestley Swain, Bishop of Burnley as “A man of great gifts, one of the most thoroughly human persons I have ever known”.

Church of England titles
Preceded by William Hough	Bishop of Woolwich; 1932–1936	Succeeded by Leslie Lang
