= George Marten (priest) =

Archdeacon of Kingston-upon-Thames (1931–1946)

George Henry Marten (20 January 1876 – 13 January 1966) was an Anglican priest: he was the Archdeacon of Kingston-upon-Thames from 1931 until 1946.

Marten was educated at Clifton College and King's College, Cambridge and ordained in 1900. Following curacies at Holy Trinity, Southwark and St Peter, Limpsfield he was successively Vicar of St Marks, Woodcote, Purley, Rural Dean of Caterham, Vicar of St Marks with St Andrews, Surbiton and Rector of Godstone.

Church of England titles
Preceded by Robert Charles Joynt	Archdeacon of Southwark; 1931–1946	Succeeded by Nicol Keith Anderson
