= Reginald Bazire =

Anglican priest

Reginald Victor Bazire (30 January 1900 – 20 October 1990) was an Anglican priest: the Archdeacon of Southwark from 1967 to 1973; and of Wandsworth from 1973 to 1975.

Bazire was educated at Christ's Hospital. and in 1922 Bazire went to China as a Missionary.

After suffering at the hands of terrorists, when Japan invaded China he was interned in the Chefoo Camp, with his wife Eileen (born 9 January 1902, an artist and a musician with the Chefoo School group in the camp), and children (Theodore, born 30 August 1928, and Peter, born 2 November 1930). Others have commented on Bazire's presence in the camp.

Returning to Britain, he served as Vicar of St Barnabas, Clapham Common from 1949 to 1967; and Rural Dean of Battersea, 1953–66.

Church of England titles
Preceded by Havilland Hubert Allport Sands	Archdeacon of Southwark; 1967–1973	Succeeded by Michael Humphrey Dickens Whinney
Preceded by Inaugural appointment	Archdeacon of Wandsworth; 1973–1975	Succeeded by Peter Bertram Coombs
