= Martin Baddeley =

Archdeacon of Southwark; Wandsworth (1936–2018)

Martin James Baddeley (10 November 1936 – 28 June 2018) was an Anglican priest who served as the Archdeacon of Reigate from 1996 to 2000.

Baddeley was the son of Walter Baddeley, Bishop of Melanesia and then Bishop of Blackburn. He was educated at Keble College, Oxford and ordained deacon in 1962 and priest in 1963. He was a Curate at St Matthew, Stretford after which he was on the staff of Lincoln Theological College. From 1974 to 1980 he was a Canon Residentiary at Rochester Cathedral. Next he was in charge of ordinations at the Southwark for 14 years. His last job before his Archdeacon's appointment was as Joint Principal of the South East Institute for Theological Education.

Baddeley died on 28 June 2018, at the age of 81.

Church of England titles
Preceded by Peter Bertram Coombs	Archdeacon of Reigate; 1996–2000	Succeeded by Daniel Steven Kimbugwe Kajumba
