= Nicol Anderson =

Nicol Keith Anderson (10 June 1882 – 1 September 1953) was an Anglican priest: he was the Archdeacon of Kingston-upon-Thames from 1946 until 1953.

== Education and career ==
Anderson was educated at Marlborough and Oriel College, Oxford and ordained in 1908. Following a curacy at St Pancras Parish Church he was: Chaplain at the Indian Ecclesiastical Establishment, Rangoon, (1911–34); Archdeacon of Rangoon, (1930 – 1934); Secretary, South London Church Fund and Southwark Diocesan Board of Finance (1935 – 1952); and a Canon Residentiary at Southwark Cathedral, (1937–50).

Church of England titles
| Preceded by George Henry Marten | Archdeacon of Southwark; 1946–1952 | Succeeded by Percy Douglas Robb |
