= David Say =

The Right Reverend David Say
- Bishop of Rochester
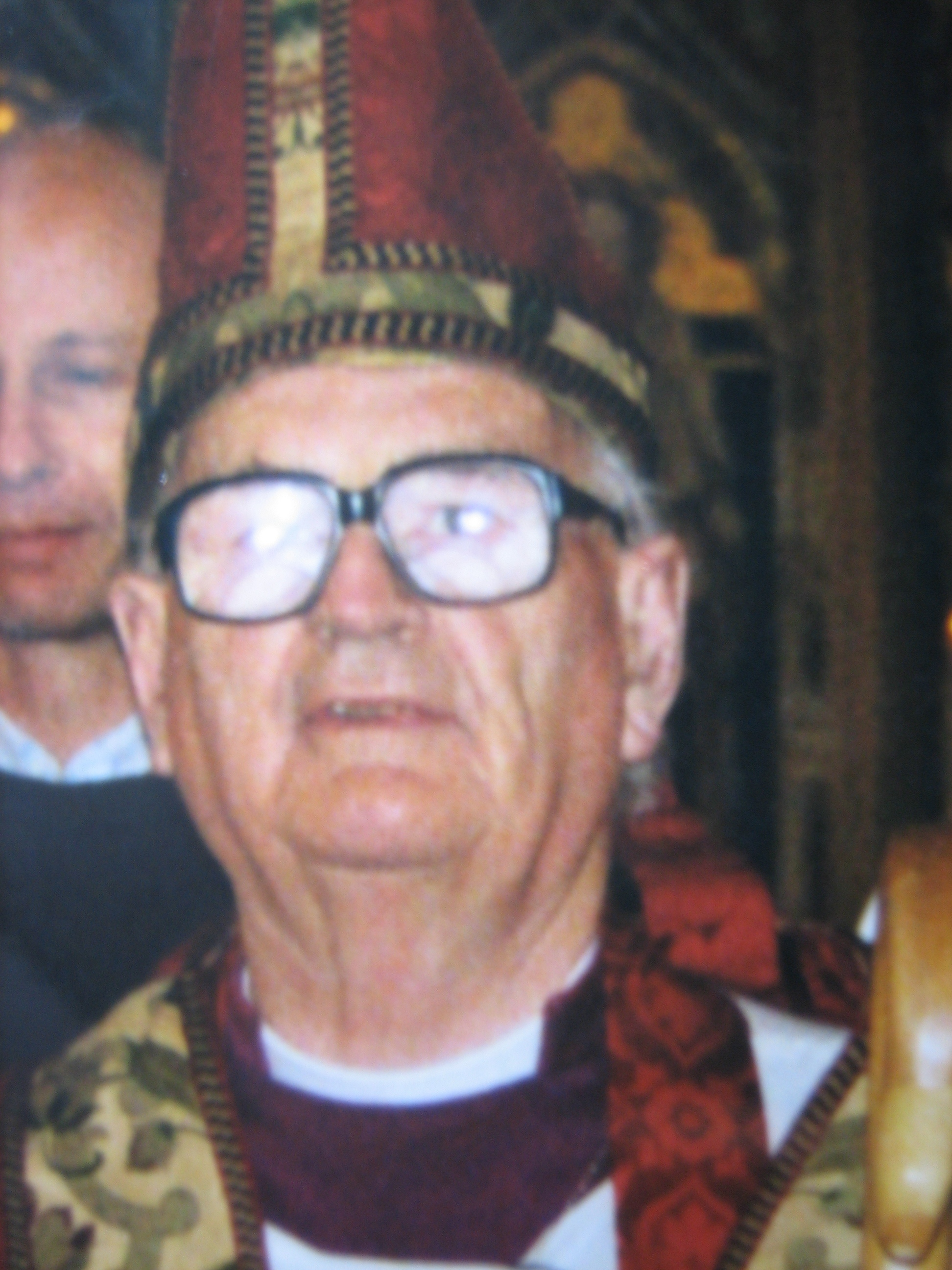
- Church: Church of England
- Diocese: Rochester
- Elected: 1961
- Term ended: 1988
- Predecessor: Christopher Chavasse
- Successor: Michael Turnbull
- Other posts: Honorary assistant bishop, Canterbury (1988–2006)

Orders
- Ordination: 1 January 1940
- Consecration: 1961

Personal details
- Born: 4 October 1914
- Died: 14 September 2006 (aged 91) Wye, Kent, England
- Denomination: Anglican
- Parents: Richard Say
- Spouse: Irene Rayner (d. 2003)
- Children: 4
- Education: Christ's College, Cambridge

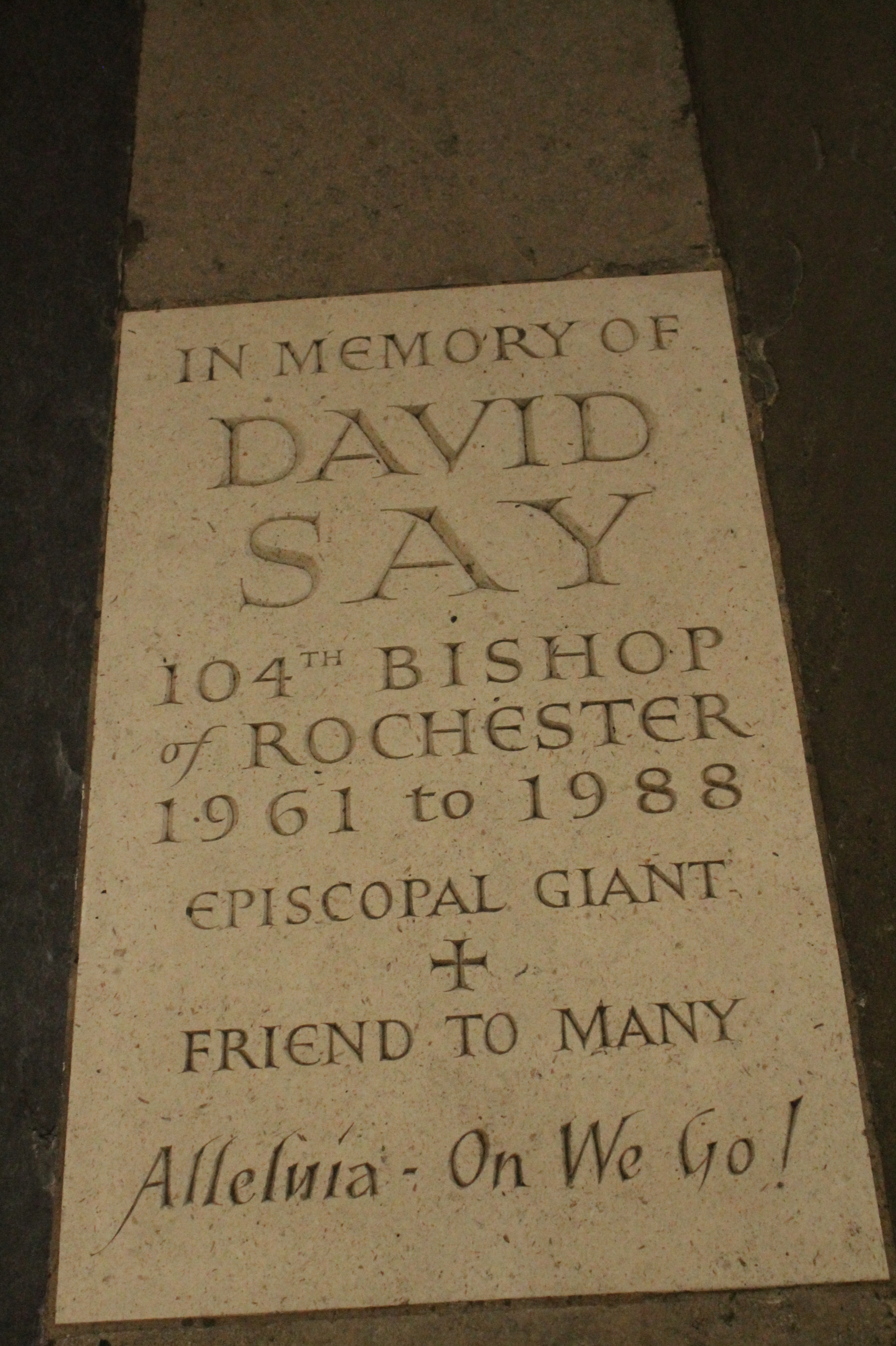
Memorial in Rochester Cathedral

Richard David Say KCVO (4 October 1914 – 14 September 2006) was the Bishop of Rochester in the Church of England from 1961 to 1988. He was often noted for his height (6 ft 4in).

== Early life and education ==
Say was the son of Commander Richard Say RNVR. He was educated at Arnold House School in London, University College School, Christ's College, Cambridge, and Ridley Hall.

== Ordained ministry ==
Say was ordained deacon in the Church of England at Canterbury Cathedral on 22 December 1939 and ordained priest just 10 days later on 1 January 1940. He served his curacy at Croydon (then in the Diocese of Canterbury), then at St Martin-in-the-Fields (Diocese of London) where he was general secretary of the Church of England Youth Council. He later became general secretary of the British Council of Churches and (as a conscious disciple of Archbishop William Temple, and a close supporter of Bishop George Bell) an Anglican representative at World Council of Churches conferences. He retired from these roles in 1955 to parish ministry in Hatfield, Hertfordshire (with the linked office of chaplain to the Marquess of Salisbury).

After his consecration as bishop in 1961, Say took a seat in the House of Lords from 1969 to 1988 (speaking there in 1986 on the admission of women to holy orders as deacons) and for some years deputised for the Archbishop of Canterbury as chairman of the board of governors of the Church Commissioners. He also spoke in the General Synod of the Church of England in favour of church marriages for divorcés (1983) and of Anglican-Methodist reunion.

== Later life ==
On retirement as Bishop of Rochester (he was one of the last bishops not required to retire at 70, whilst the final words at his retirement service being "Alleluia — on we go") he moved to Wye where he was active in the parish and was an honorary assistant bishop in the Diocese of Canterbury until shortly before his death.

Say supported the city of Rochester, Chatham, Kent County Cricket Club, the University of Kent (serving as pro chancellor for several years) and, later, Canterbury itself. He was also for 18 years High Almoner to the Queen. He was honorary chaplain of the Pilgrims Society from 1968 to 2002.

== Death and legacy ==
On Say's death, the Bishop of Dover, Stephen Venner, said:

I was privileged to benefit from Bishop David's advice and friendship over the years. Even when I saw him a few days before he died, he typically ministered to me as much as I to him.

Say's funeral service was celebrated in the nave of Canterbury Cathedral on 27 September 2006 and a public memorial service was held on 2 February 2007 at Rochester Cathedral (with a sermon by the then Bishop of Rochester, Michael Nazir-Ali). His wife Irene was a justice of the peace and gardener who died in 2003. They had a son and two daughters.

== Quotations ==
- He believed the greatest danger to the Church of England was concentrating "on laundering our surplices" and forgetting its true mission, which was "from Corrymeela to Calcutta, washing the world's feet".
- "God is the God of the future as well as of the past."

Church of England titles
Preceded by Christopher Chavasse	Bishop of Rochester; 1961–1988	Succeeded by Michael Turnbull
