= John Kiddle (priest) =

John Kiddle (born 28 June 1958) is a retired senior Anglican clergyman, who served as Archdeacon of Wandsworth from 2015 until 2025.

== Background & education ==
Descended from a Hampshire family, Kiddle was educated at Monkton Combe School, Somerset, and went up to Queens' College, Cambridge (MA 1983) before studying for the priesthood at Ridley Hall. He later pursued further studies at Heythrop College, London (MTh 2002).

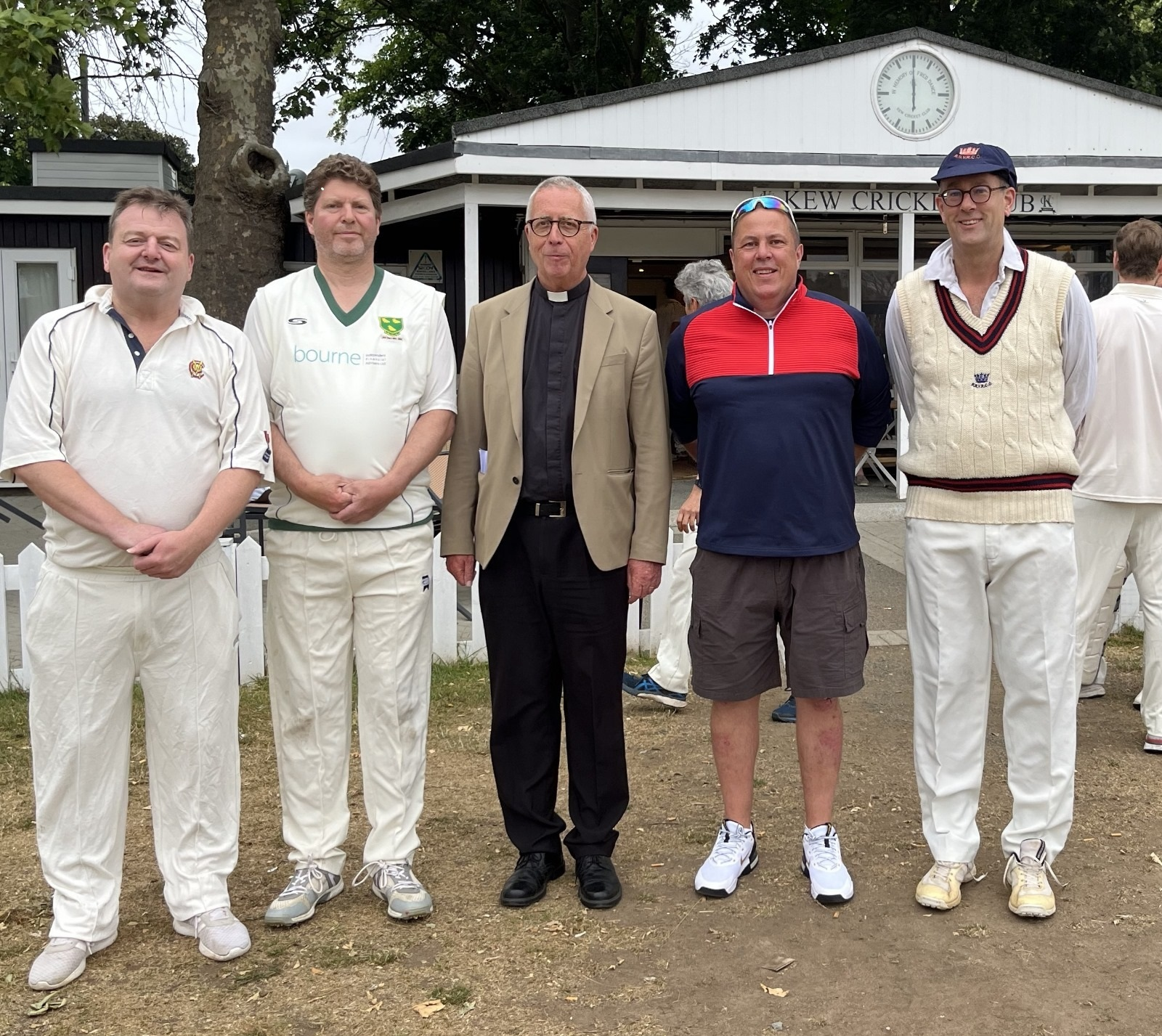
The Ven. John Kiddle (centre) at Kew Green in 2024 blessing the inaugural T20 cricket match between the Haberdashers' and Salters' Companies

== Ministry ==
Ordained in 1983, after a curacy at Ormskirk, Lancashire, he held incumbencies in Huyton and then Watford, Hertfordshire. Appointed a Canon Residentiary of St Albans Cathedral in 2010, Kiddle obtained preferment in 2015 as Archdeacon of Wandsworth.

His responsibilities as Archdeacon of Wandsworth are various and include administrative oversight over five deaneries throughout South West London extending from Battersea to Kingston including Tooting, Richmond & Barnes and of course Wandsworth. Kiddle particularly enjoys advancing Southwark diocese's missional and pastoral work in the parishes under his jurisdiction. He retired effective 30 June 2025.

== See also ==
- Admiral Sir Edward Buxton Kiddle

Church of England titles
Preceded by Stephen Roberts	Archdeacon of Wandsworth; 2015–2025	Succeeded by Bridget Shepherd (announced)
