= Kurt (surname) =

Kurt is a Turkish name and surname literally meaning "wolf".

- Ahmet Kurt Pasha, 18th Century Ottoman governor
- Elvira Kurt (Kürt Elvíra), Hungarian-born Canadian comedian
- Hamide Kurt (born 1993), Turkish female Paralympian athlete
- İpar Özay Kurt (born 2003), Turkey women's volleyball player
- Katherine Kurt (1852-1910), American homeopath and temperance activist
- Metin Kurt (1947-2012), Turkish footballer
- Kemal Kurt (1947-2002), Turkish author, translator and photographer
- Sabahudin Kurt (1935–2018), Bosnian singer
- Şeyda Kurt (born 1992), German-Turkish journalist
- Seyhan Kurt, French-Turkish poet, writer and sociologist
- Simay Kurt (born 2000), Turkish volleyball player
- Ümit Kurt (born 1991), Turkish footballer
- Yaşar Kurt (born 1968), Turkish rock artist
- Yeliz Kurt (born 1984), Turkish female middle distance runner
