= Gordon Kuhrt =

- Born: 15 February 1941 (age 84); Madras, India
- Occupation(s): Minister, author
- Religion: Anglican
- Offices held: Archdeacon of Lewisham, Director of Ministry for the Archbishops' Council of the Church of England

Gordon Wilfred Kuhrt (born 15 February 1941) is an Anglican priest and author. He was the Archdeacon of Lewisham from 1989 to 1996. He served as a member of the General Synod of the Church of England from 1986 to 1996. Afterwards, he was Director of Ministry for the Archbishops' Council of the Church of England. He is now retired, married to Olive Kuhrt and has 3 sons and 10 grandchildren.

Kuhrt was educated at Colfe's Grammar School, University of London and Middlesex University. He was ordained in 1967 and served curacies at Illogan and Wallington. He held incumbencies at St John the Baptist Shenstone and Emmanuel, South Croydon.

== Early life ==
In his autobiographical book, Life's Not Always Easy, Kuhrt tells of his childhood. He was born in the Indian city of Madras during the Second World War, which prevented his parents from returning to England. He was born with clubbed feet, and then, still in India, he contracted poliomyelitis at the age of 15 months, which exacerbated his health issues. The family finally returned to England in January 1945, and were able to see Dr. Paul Brand, who then treated him at Great Ormond Street Children's Hospital, London. In 1946, his parents returned to India to the mission field, but were unable to take their son, owing to the ongoing treatment. For the next five years the young Gordon Kuhrt lived with foster parents, the Thorpes. He did not see his parents again until he was 10.

After attending Colfe's Grammar School, much interrupted by hospital treatment, he graduated with a degree in Theology from London University. He was then a schoolteacher for Religious education in a Comprehensive School.

== Ministry ==
Kuhrt was ordained in 1967 and served curacies at Illogan and Wallington. He held incumbencies at St John the Baptist Shenstone and Emmanuel, South Croydon. He was elected to the General Synod of the Church of England in 1986, and served on the Council for Ministry. He was also a member of the Drafting and Steering Committees for the legislation for the ordination of women.

He was appointed Archdeacon of Lewisham in 1989 and remained in that post until 1996. In that year he was made Director of Ministry for the Archbishops' Council of the Church of England. He gained a Doctor of Professional Studies degree from Middlesex University. He has been for many years a Fellow and Tutor of the College of Preachers. He retired in 2011, but for six years remained Associate Minister for Tredington, Warwickshire. He now lives in Haddenham, Buckinghamshire.

== Bibliography ==
- A Handbook for Council and committee members: A Practical Guide to their Work' (1985)
- Believing In Baptism: Christian Baptism Its Theology And Practice (1987)
- The Church and its Unity (Parts 3) (1992)
- Doctrine Matters (1993)
- To Proclaim Afresh: Evangelical Agenda for the Church (1995)
- Ministry Issues For The Church Of England: Mapping The Trends (2001)
- Doctors in Society: Medical professionalism in a changing world (Contributor) (2005)
- Life’s Not Always Easy (with Pip Prideaux-Selby) (2011)
- An Introduction To Christian Ministry (2012)
- Bridging The Gap: Reader Ministry Today (Editor) (2012)
- Believing In Baptism (New Edition): Understanding and Living God's Covenant Sign (with Stephen Kuhrt) (2020)

Church of England titles
| Preceded by Clifford George Lacey | Archdeacon of Lewisham; 1989–1996 | Succeeded by David John Atkinson |
