= John Robinson (bishop of Woolwich) =

English biblical scholar, author and Anglican bishop (1919–1983)

The Right Reverend John Robinson
- Bishop of Woolwich
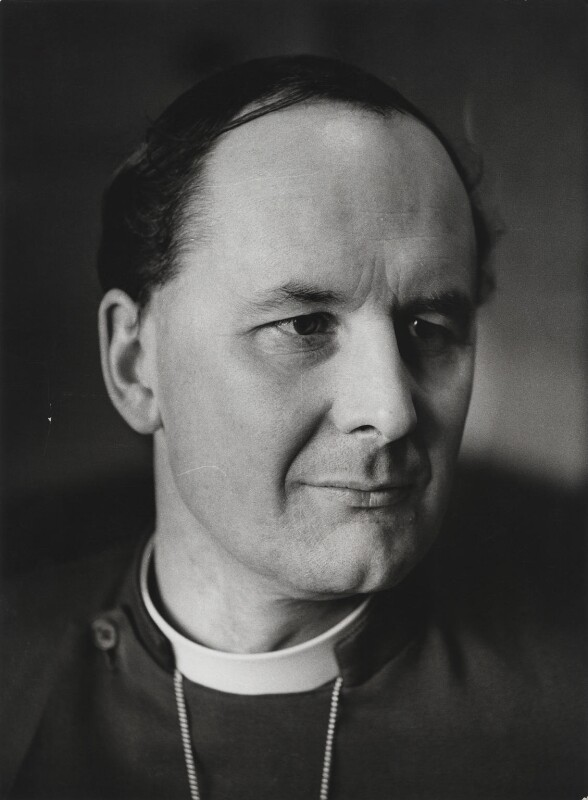
- Robinson in 1963
- Church: Church of England
- Diocese: Southwark
- In office: 1959 to 1969
- Predecessor: Robert Stannard
- Successor: David Sheppard
- Other post: Dean of Chapel of Trinity College, Cambridge (1969–1983)

Orders
- Ordination: 1945 (deacon); 1946 (priest)
- Consecration: 1959 by Geoffrey Fisher

Personal details
- Born: John Arthur Thomas Robinson; 16 May 1919 Canterbury, Kent, England
- Died: 5 December 1983 (aged 64) Arncliffe, North Yorkshire, England
- Denomination: Anglicanism
- Profession: Clergyman and scholar
- Education: Westcott House, Cambridge

John Arthur Thomas Robinson (16 May 1919 – 5 December 1983) was an English New Testament scholar, author and the Anglican Bishop of Woolwich. He was a lecturer at Trinity College, Cambridge, and later Dean of Chapel at Trinity College, until his death in 1983 from cancer. Robinson was considered a major force in New Testament studies and in shaping liberal Christian theology. Along with the Harvard theologian Harvey Cox, he spearheaded the field of secular theology and, like William Barclay, was a believer in universal salvation.

== Early life and education ==
Robinson was born on 16 May 1919 in the precincts of Canterbury Cathedral, England, where his late father had been a canon. He was educated at Marlborough College, then an all-boys' public school in Marlborough, Wiltshire. He studied at Jesus College, Cambridge, and Trinity College, Cambridge, and then trained for ordination at Westcott House.

== Ordained ministry ==
Robinson was ordained in the Church of England as a deacon in 1945 and as a priest in 1946. From 1945 to 1948, he served his curacy at St Matthew's Church, Moorfields in the Diocese of Bristol. The vicar at the time was Mervyn Stockwood.

In 1948, Robinson became chaplain of Wells Theological College, where he wrote his first book, In the End, God. In 1951, he was appointed Fellow and Dean of Clare College, Cambridge and a lecturer in divinity at Cambridge University.

Following an invitation from Stockwood, by then the Bishop of Southwark, Robinson became the Bishop of Woolwich in 1959. The appointment of Robinson as a suffragan bishop was in Stockwood's gift, and whilst the Archbishop of Canterbury (at that point Geoffrey Fisher) questioned the appointment on the grounds that he believed Robinson at that point would be doing more valuable work as a theologian, he accepted that once he had given advice he had "done all that it was proper for him to do" and proceeded to consecrate Robinson to the episcopate. In 1960 Robinson served as a witness for the defence in the obscenity trial of Penguin Books for the publication of D. H. Lawrence's Lady Chatterley's Lover. Following a ten-year period at Woolwich, Robinson returned to Cambridge in 1969 as Fellow and Dean of Chapel at Trinity College, where he lectured and continued to write.

== Death ==
Robinson was diagnosed with terminal cancer in 1983 and died on 5 December of that year in Arncliffe, North Yorkshire.

== Selected writings ==
=== In the End, God (1950) ===
Modern Universalist writer Brian Hebblethwaite cites Robinson's In the End, God: A Study of the Christian Doctrine of the Last Things as arguing for the universal reconciliation of all immortal souls. Ken R. Vincent, in The Golden Thread states: "Robinson notes that Christ, in Origen's old words, remains on the Cross so long as one sinner remains in [H]ell. This is not speculation: it is a statement grounded in the very necessity of God's nature." George Hunsinger, author of Disruptive Grace: Studies in the Theology of Karl Barth writes that "[i]f one is looking for an uninhibited proponent of universal salvation, Robinson leaves nothing to be desired."

=== Jesus and His Coming (1957) ===
In this book, an analysis of the early history of the doctrine of the parousia, Robinson states: "That the heart of the Christian hope was now, once more to 'wait for God's son from heaven', for a second and final coming which would complete and crown the first, is a belief for which we have found no firm foundation in the words of Jesus himself." Robinson further argued that there was a tendency in the early church to alter the meaning of sayings of Jesus that originally referred to his death and ascension into heaven, to refer to an event in the future that had not yet happened. (Note: "It is this shift of emphasis which, I believe, may be seen at work upon the sayings of Jesus and was to prove one of the most potent factors in attributing to him a concern with a second event lying beyond his on ministry. In the course of transmission his teaching became focused not upon the present event whose urgency he was proclaiming but upon another event whose imminence he was predicting. [...] His concern was with the present moment, with the crisis introduced into history by the advent of the Kingdom of God, at work proleptically in his ministry and shortly to be 'fulfilled' in his death and vindication.")

=== Liturgy coming to Life (1960) ===
As the Preface says, "This book is an account of liturgical experiment at Clare College, Cambridge, of which I was privileged to be Dean from 1951 to 1959. It seeks to describe how liturgy can come to life." At the time of that experiment there was widespread dissatisfaction with the uniform use of the Book of Common Prayer, especially for Holy Communion, particularly amongst the emerging more rebellious younger generation. Despite much debate, both popular and academic, there seem no prospect of change. In this context, Robinson revitalised worship at the college chapel through attention to actions: what worshippers did rather than what they said. He also formed the view that the message conveyed by conventional worship did not align with his interpretation of the essential gospel message. The foundation of this work derives from recognising that the term liturgy comes from two Greek words, laos and ergon, meaning people and work. Critically, he argued, liturgy should be about what people do together. If it had not been overtaken by the work of the Liturgical Commission that soon after produced Series 1, and that followed it up the Common Worship, it might have remained a more seminal memory.

=== Honest to God (1963) ===
Robinson wrote several well-received books. The most popular was Honest to God published in 1963. According to Exploration into God in (1967), he felt its chief contribution was its attempt to synthesize the work of theologians Paul Tillich and Dietrich Bonhoeffer, both of them well known in theological circles, but whose views were largely unknown to the people in the pews. The book proved contentious because it called on Christians to view God as the "Ground of Being" rather than as a supernatural being "out there". The modifications of the Divine image posited by Robinson have some aspects in common with the psychological deconstruction of God-ideas put forward by his fellow Cambridge theologian Harry Williams in his contribution to the symposium "Soundings" edited by Alec Vidler and published in 1962. When that book was being produced, Robinson was not asked to contribute, because he was then thought to be too conservative a New Testament scholar. This view has never quite dissipated, for in his later books, Robinson would champion early dates and apostolic authorship for the gospels, largely without success.

The media furor concerning Honest to God – one which was to portray him as anything but conservative in the public mind – led to a criticism of Robinson in the Church Assembly (the precursor of the General Synod of the Church of England) by the Archbishop of Canterbury Michael Ramsey, and there were calls from many quarters for Robinson to resign or be deposed. Whilst Ramsey took Robinson to task for his views, Ramsey's pamphlet "Image Old and New" rushed out as a response, did not entirely dismiss what had been said. Indeed, Ramsey would later admit in a letter to Mervyn Stockwood that he regretted the way in which he had handled the matter. The book, which has remained almost consistently in print, proposes abandoning the notion of God "out there", existing somewhere as a "cosmic supremo", just as we have abandoned already the idea of God "up there", the notion of "the old man up in the sky". In its place, he offered a reinterpretation of God as "Love". After endorsing Paul Tillich's assertion that God is the "ground of all being", Robinson wrote: "For it is in [Jesus] making himself nothing, in his utter self-surrender to others in love, that he discloses and lays bare the ground of man's being as Love ... For assertions about God are in the last analysis assertions about Love". While some of its ideas have been taken up by more liberal circles of Christian thought, proponents of the traditional interpretation of Christianity, both Catholic and Protestant, reject Robinson's thesis as an unnecessary capitulation to Modernism.

To what extent this is in fact the case depends very much on the frame of reference of the reader. However, the work of Robinson in Honest to God provided a departure point which would be followed up in the writings of the radical theologians Don Cupitt and John Shelby Spong and in the 1977 symposium The Myth of God Incarnate, edited by John Hick. Whether Robinson would have gone as far as Cupitt did in declaring the idea of God to be an entirely human creation is something which can only be conjectured. However, he said as he was dying that he "never doubted the essential truth of Christianity". Robinson seemed to rapidly become a person upon whom religious people projected their own ideas of what he was like, and the book The Honest to God Debate, edited by Robinson and by David L Edwards, also published in 1963, contains a mixture of articles which either praise Robinson for his approach or accuse him of atheism.

=== Redating the New Testament (1976) ===
Although Robinson was considered a liberal theologian, he challenged the work of like-minded colleagues in the field of exegetical criticism. Specifically, Robinson examined the reliability of the New Testament as he believed that it had been the subject of very little original research during the 20th century. He also wrote that past scholarship was based on a "tyranny of unexamined assumptions" and an "almost wilful blindness".

Robinson concluded that much of the New Testament was written before AD 64, partly basing his judgement on the sparse textual evidence that the New Testament reflects knowledge of the destruction of the Temple in Jerusalem in AD 70. In relation to the four gospels' dates of authorship, Robinson placed Matthew as being written sometime between AD 40 and the AD 60s, Mark sometime between AD 45 and AD 60, Luke sometime during the AD 50s and the 60s and John sometime between AD 40 and AD 65 or later. Robinson also argued that the letter of James was penned by a brother of Jesus Christ within twenty years of Jesus' death, that Paul authored all the books attributed to him, and that the "John" who wrote the fourth Gospel was the apostle John. Robinson also suggested that the results of his investigations implied a need to rewrite many theologies of the New Testament.

In a letter to Robinson, the New Testament scholar C. H. Dodd wrote, "I should agree with you that much of the late dating is quite arbitrary, even wanton[;] the offspring not of any argument that can be presented, but rather of the critic's prejudice that, if he appears to assent to the traditional position of the early church, he will be thought no better than a stick-in-the-mud." Robinson's call for redating the New Testament – or, at least, the four gospels – was echoed in subsequent scholarship such as John Wenham's work Redating Matthew, Mark and Luke: A Fresh Assault on the Synoptic Problem and work by Claude Tresmontant, Günther Zuntz, Carsten Peter Thiede, Eta Linnemann, Harold Riley, Jean Carmignac, and Bernard Orchard.

Bart Ehrman maintains that Robinson's early dates for the gospels, especially those for John, have not been taken up among most liberal scholars of Biblical historicity. Some conservative and traditionalist scholars, however, concur with his dating of the synoptic gospels.

=== The Priority of John (1984) ===
In The Priority of John, Robinson furthered the argument put forward in Redating the New Testament that all the books were written before 70 AD, by focusing on the book that is placed early least often. He also wanted to prove that John is independent of the Synoptics and better than them at describing the length and time period of Jesus' ministry, Palestinian geography, and the cultural milieu of the early first century there.

This work was put together posthumously by J. F. Coakley according to Robinson's basically complete but unfinished notes for his Bampton Lectures.

== Other ==
Robinson was also noted for his 1960 court testimony against the censorship of Lady Chatterley's Lover, claiming that it was a book which "every Christian should read."

Robinson's legacy includes the work of the now late Episcopal bishop John Shelby Spong in best-selling books that include salutes by Spong to Robinson as a lifelong mentor. In a 2013 interview, Spong recalls reading Robinson's 1963 book:

I can remember reading his first book as if was yesterday. I was rather snobbish when the book came out. I actually refused to read it at first. Then, when I read it – I couldn’t stop. I read it three times! My theology was never the same. I had to wrestle with how I could take the literalism I had picked up in Sunday school and put it into these new categories.

The Bishop John Robinson School in Thamesmead, south-east London, which is within the area for which he was responsible as Bishop of Woolwich, is named after him.

== Works ==
- The Body: A Study in Pauline Theology. Bimillennial Press. 2002a [1952]. ISBN 978-0-9641388-4-1..
- Jesus and His Coming. SCM Press. 1979 [1959]. ISBN 978-0-334-00757-9.
- On Being the Church in the World. Mowbrays. 1977 [1960]. ISBN 978-0-264-66459-0.
- Twelve New Testament Studies. SCM. 1962. ISBN 9780334047254.
- Honest to God. Westminster John Knox Press. 2002b [1963]. ISBN 978-0-664-22422-6.
- The New Reformation?. SCM Press. 1965. ISBN 9780334011248.
- Exploration into God. Stanford University Press. 1967. ISBN 978-0-8047-4636-6.
- But That I Can't Believe!. New American Library. 1967.
- In the End, God: A Study of the Christian Doctrine of the Last Things. James Clarke & Co. 2011b [1968]. ISBN 978-0-227-17349-7.
- The Difference in Being a Christian Today. Collins. 1972 [1971]. ISBN 9780006229575.
- The Human Face of God. Hymns Ancient & Modern. 1 March 2012 [1973]. ISBN 978-1-85931-016-8.
- Redating the New Testament. Wipf & Stock. 1 October 2000 [1976]. ISBN 978-1-57910-527-3.
- "The New Testament Dating Game", Time, p. 95, 21 March 1977
- Truth is Two-Eyed. SCM Press. 1 November 1979. ISBN 978-0-334-01690-8.
- Wrestling with Romans. Hymns Ancient & Modern. 1979. ISBN 978-0-334-01819-3.
- The Roots of a Radical. Crossroad. 1981. ISBN 978-0-8245-0028-3.
- Where Three Ways Meet. SCM Press. 1987 [1983]. ISBN 978-0-334-02422-4.
- Twelve More New Testament Studies. SCM. 1984. ISBN 978-0-334-01693-9.
- Liturgy coming to Life, Mowbrays. 1960. ISBN not available
- Coakley, J. F., ed. (2011a) [1985]. The Priority of John. Wipf & Stock. ISBN 978-1-61097-102-7.

== Sources ==
- James, Eric (1988). A life of Bishop John A. T. Robinson: scholar, pastor, prophet. Wm B Eerdmans. ISBN 978-0-8028-3651-9.
- Kee, Alistair (January 1988). The Roots of Christian Freedom: The Theology of John A. T. Robinson. SPCK. ISBN 978-0-281-04338-5.
- Edwards, David Lawrence (1963). The "Honest to God" Debate: Some Reactions to the Book "Honest to God". Westminster Press. ISBN 9789030038153.
- McLeod, Hugh (2017). "The Number One Theological Best Seller. John Robinsons Honest to God". In Gumundsson, David; Nykvist, Martin (eds.). Classics in Northern European Church History over 500 Years. Essays in Honour of Anders Jarlert. Frankfurt am Main: Peter Lang. ISBN 9783631720837.

Church of England titles
Preceded by Robert Stannard	Bishop of Woolwich; 1959–1969	Succeeded by David Sheppard
