= Charles Pinder =

Anglican priest

Charles Pinder (5 May 1921 – 2 April 1999) was an Anglican priest in the 20th century.

He was born on 5 May 1921, educated at Selwyn College, Cambridge, and King's College London (AKC), and ordained in 1951. After a curacy at St Saviour's Raynes Park he was the vicar of All Saints' Hatcham Park then St Laurence's Catford. He was the sub dean of Lewisham then the borough dean of Lambeth from 1973 to 1986. He died on 2 April 1999.

== Notes ==
Church of England titles
Preceded by Inaugural appointment	Archdeacon of Lambeth; 1986– 1988	Succeeded by Dick Bird
