= Karowei Dorgu =

Nigerian bishop (1958–2023)

The Right Reverend Karowei Dorgu
- Bishop of Woolwich
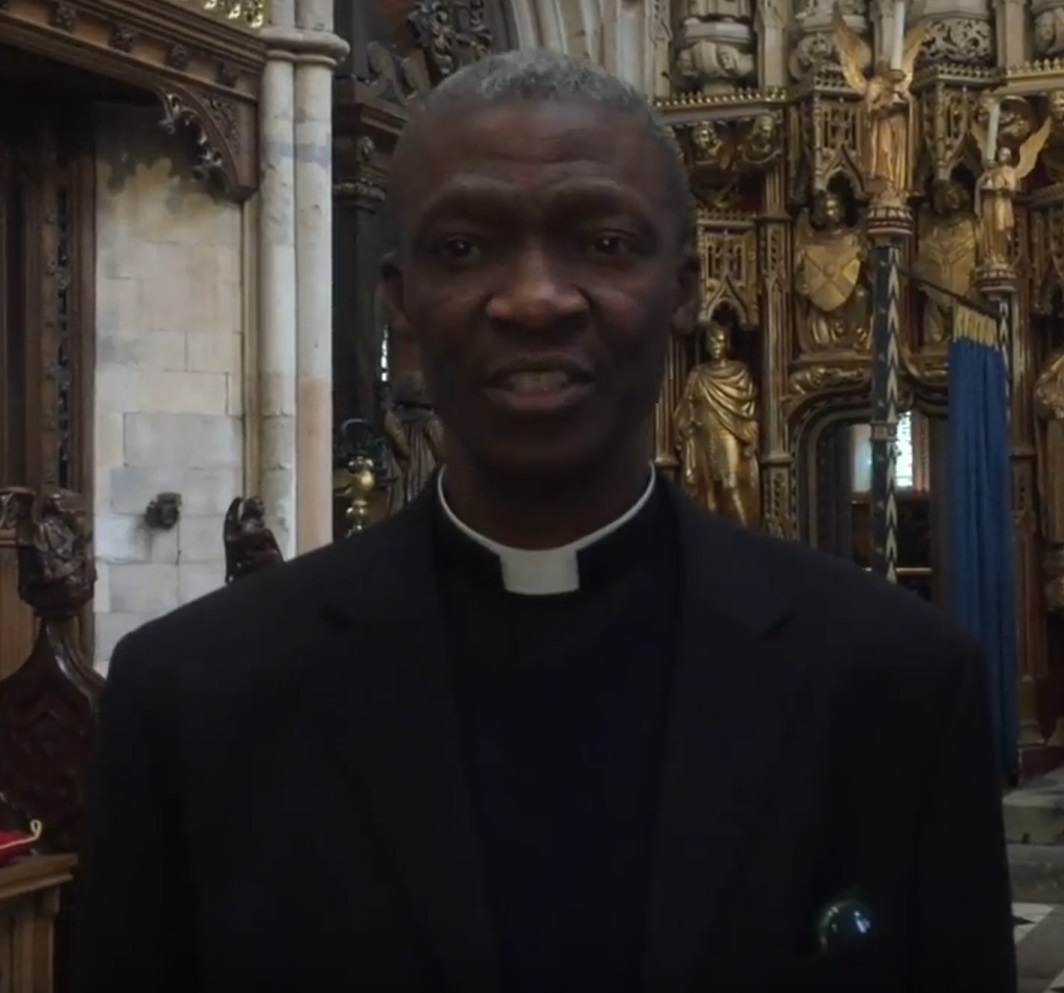
- Dorgu in 2016
- Church: Church of England
- Diocese: Diocese of Southwark
- In office: 17 March 2017 – 8 September 2023
- Predecessor: Michael Ipgrave
- Other posts: Vicar of St John the Evangelist Church, Upper Holloway (2012–2017)

Orders
- Ordination: 1 July 1995 (deacon); 1996 (priest)
- Consecration: 17 March 2017 by Justin Welby

Personal details
- Born: Woyin Karowei Dorgu; 27 June 1958 Burutu, Delta State, Federation of Nigeria
- Died: 8 September 2023 (aged 65) London, England
- Denomination: Anglicanism
- Spouse: Mosun
- Children: Two
- Education: University of Lagos; London Bible College; Oak Hill College

Woyin Karowei Dorgu (27 June 1958 – 8 September 2023) was a Nigerian-born Church of England bishop and medical doctor. He was the Bishop of Woolwich, an area bishop in the Diocese of Southwark from his consecration on 17 March 2017 until his death.

== Early life and education ==
Dorgu was born on 27 June 1958 in Burutu, Nigeria. He was the 11th of 12 children born to George Kpunakpu Dorgu, a civil servant and Anglican lay reader, and Matilda Elizabeth (née Torru), a church warden. From 1979 to 1985, he studied at the College of Medicine, University of Lagos, graduating with Bachelor of Medicine, Bachelor of Surgery (MBBS) degrees. He then worked as a general practitioner (GP).

In 1987, Dorgu moved to the United Kingdom. From 1990 to 1993, he studied theology at the London Bible College, an evangelical theological college in Northwood, Greater London. He completed a Diploma in Evangelism in 1991, a Diploma in Pastoral Studies in 1993, and graduated with a Bachelor of Arts (BA) degree in 1993. In 1993, he entered Oak Hill College, a Conservative Evangelical theological college, to train for ordained ministry. He left after two years to be ordained in the Church of England.

== Ordained ministry ==
Dorgu was ordained in the Church of England as a deacon, by David Hope, Bishop of London, on 1 July 1995 at St Paul's Cathedral; and as a priest in 1996. From 1995 to 1998, he served his curacy at St Mark's Church, Tollington Park, Islington in the Diocese of London. He then joined St. John the Evangelist Church, Upper Holloway; he served as an assistant curate/associate vicar from 1998 to 2000, team vicar from 2000 to 2012, and was the Vicar (incumbent) from 2012. On 6 March 2016, he was additionally made a prebendary of St Paul's Cathedral.

=== Episcopal ministry ===
On 20 December 2016, Dorgu was announced as the next Bishop of Woolwich, a suffragan and area bishop in the Diocese of Southwark. He was consecrated a bishop by Justin Welby, the Archbishop of Canterbury, during service at Southwark Cathedral on 17 March 2017. As such, Dorgu became the first ever Nigerian bishop in the Church of England, and the first black person to be consecrated a bishop in the Church of England since John Sentamu in 1996. At the end of the service, Sentamu, now the Archbishop of York, gifted Dorgu a mitre; this mitre had turn been given to Sentamu by Wilfred Wood, the first black bishop in the Church of England and a former bishop of the Diocese of Southwark.

=== Views ===
Dorgu identified with the evangelical tradition of the Church of England. He supported the Church's current position on human sexuality; it defines marriage as between a man and a woman, and requires gay clergy to be celibate.

In 2023, following the news that the House of Bishops of the Church of England was to introduce proposals for blessing same-sex relationships, he signed an open letter which stated:

many Christians in the Church of England and the Anglican Communion, together with Christians from across the churches of world Christianity, continue to believe that marriage is given by God for the union of a man and woman and that it cannot be extended to those who are of the same sex. [...] Without seeking to diminish the value of many committed same-sex relationships, for which there is much to give thanks, we find ourselves constrained by what we sincerely believe the Scriptures teach which cannot be set aside.

Unusually for an evangelical, he suggested that as the death and resurrection of Jesus was the centre of the Christian message that "We should celebrate the Eucharist every day."

== Personal life and death ==
Dorgu was married to Mosun; she also trained as a medical doctor in Nigeria and now works as a consultant child psychiatrist. Together they had two children. One son died while at school in 2015, and his parents set up the "Joshua Dorgu Foundation" in his memory.

After "a long struggle with his health", Dorgu died on 8 September 2023 at King's College Hospital, London, England, from pneumonia; he was aged 65.
