= Danny Kajumba =

Ugandan-British Anglican priest (born 1952)

Daniel Steven Kimbugwe Kajumba
- Archdeacon of Reigate
- Installed: 2001
- Term ended: 2016

Personal details
- Born: 20 November 1952 (age 73) Uganda
- Occupation: Anglican priest
- Education: Open University

Prince Daniel Steven Kimbugwe Kajumba (born 20 November 1952) is a retired Ugandan-British Anglican priest and a member of the Buganda Royal Family. Since 2001, he has been the Archdeacon of Reigate in the Diocese of the Southwark for 15 years .

== Background ==
He went to the United kingdom as a refugee from Uganda in the early 1970s and served in various capacities; as a missionary, pastor, community activist and championed minority ethnic Anglican concerns. Kanjumba is married to Tina and they have two children.

== Career ==
Kajumba has served as non-stipendiary minister in the Ugandan government. He was a general secretary of Buganda Kingdom. He was appointed Archdeacon of Reigate in the United Kingdom for 15 years and retired in February 2016, he is a chairman of tritrees which is a non-profitable organisation focused on humanitarian and environmental causes.Throughout his career, he has been a vocal advocate for increasing representation of ethnic minorities in senior positions within the Church of England.

Kajumba was educated at school in Uganda and also has a degree from the Open University; and was ordained after earlier jobs in the caring professions in 1986. After a curacy in Goldington he worked in his home country until 1998. He was then team vicar of Horley until his archdeacon's appointment. He was appointed as a member of the board of governors of Monkton Combe School in 2004.

Kajumba's retirement was announced as 23 February 2016.

Legacy

Dany Kajumba is recognized as a missionary, evangelist, and social activist who has made significant contributions to both the Ugandan and British communities.

== See also ==
- Anglican ministry
- George Herbert
- Janani Luwum
- Anglicanism

Church of England titles
Preceded by Martin Baddeley	Archdeacon of Reigate; 2001–present	Incumbent
