= Archdeacon of Bromley & Bexley =

Church of England ecclesiastical office

The Archdeacon of Bromley & Bexley is a senior ecclesiastical officer in charge of the Bromley & Bexley archdeaconry in the Church of England Diocese of Rochester. The archdeaconry was created — as the Archdeaconry of Bromley, from the Archdeaconry of Rochester — by Order in Council on 4 January 1955.

== List of archdeacons ==
- 1955–1966 (d.): Reginald McCahearty
- 1966–1968 (res.): David Halsey
- 1968–1969 (res.): David Stewart-Smith
- 1969–1978 (ret.): Herbert Cragg (afterwards archdeacons emeritus)
- 1979–1994 (ret.): Edward Francis (afterwards archdeacons emeritus)
- 1994–2003 (ret.): Garth Norman (afterwards archdeacons emeritus)

The archdeaconry was renamed to Bromley & Bexley at the beginning of 2002.

- 2003–2022 (ret.): Paul Wright
- 23 April 2023 – present: Allie Kerr
