= Samuel Cheetham (priest) =

Samuel Cheetham , DD, FSA (3 March 1827 – 9 July 1908) was an eminent Anglican priest and author in the last quarter of the nineteenth century and the first decade of the twentieth.

Cheetham was born in Hambleton, Rutland and educated at Oakham School and Christ's College, Cambridge. He was an Assistant Tutor of his old college from 1853 until 1858; and then professor of Pastoral Theology at King's College London until 1882, during which time he was also Chaplain of Dulwich College. In 1879 he became Archdeacon of Southwark; and in 1882 of Rochester, a post he held until his death.
