= Charles Burney (archdeacon of Kingston) =

Anglican priest (1815–1907)

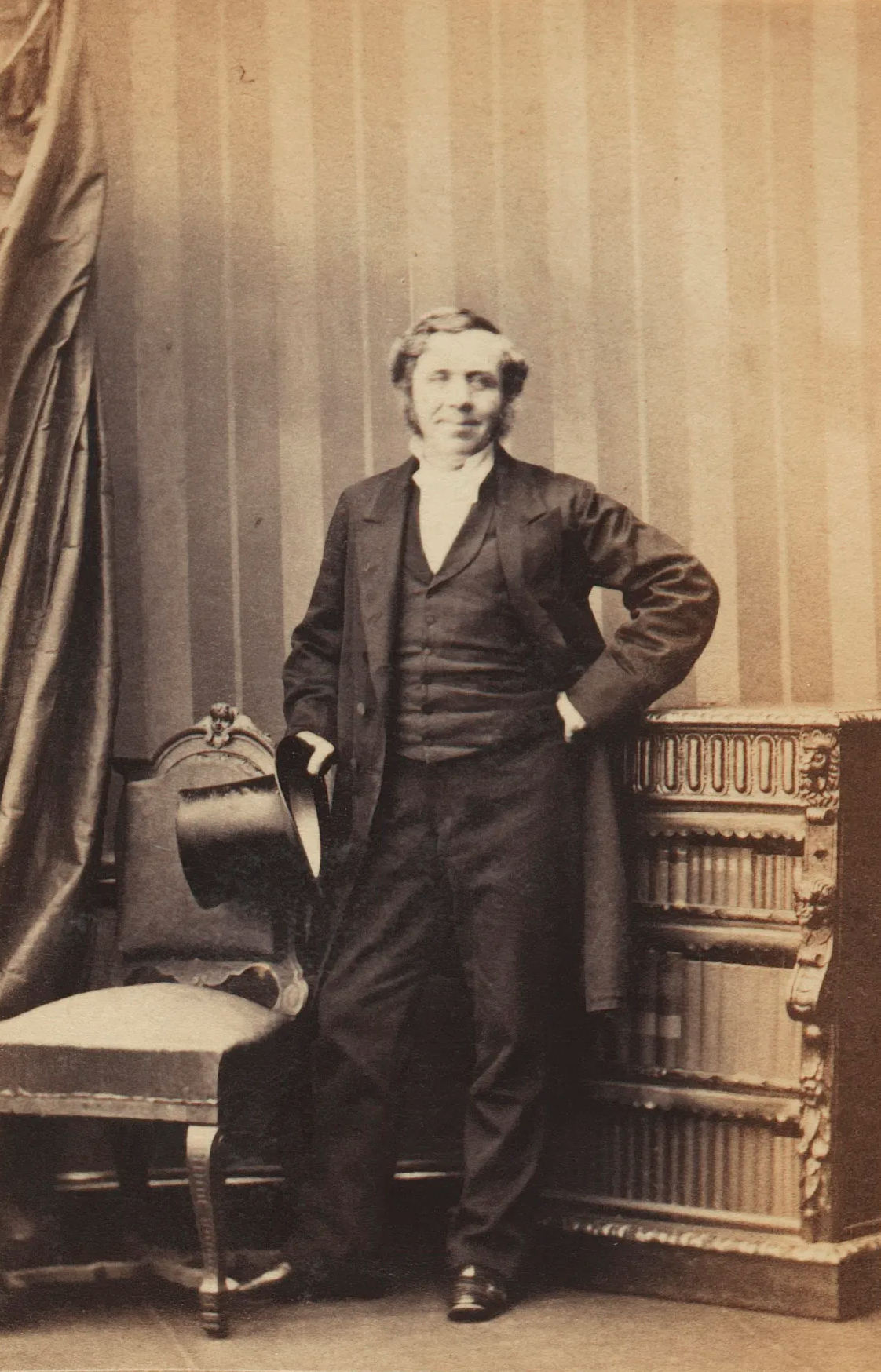
Burney in 1861

Charles Burney (1815 – 1 January 1907) was an Anglican priest: the Archdeacon of Kingston-upon-Thames from 1879 to 1904.

The son of a clergyman, Burney was educated at Magdalen College, Oxford. He was ordained in 1838 and began his career as a curate at his father's church in Sible Hedingham.

He was Vicar of Halstead from 1850 to 1864; Rector of Wickham Bishops from 1864 to 1870 and Vicar of St Mark's Church, Surbiton, from 1870.

He died on 1 January 1907.
