= Leslie Lang =

Leslie Hamilton Lang (27 May 1889 – 12 March 1974) was the fourth Bishop of Woolwich.

== Biography ==
Born on 27 May 1889 and educated at Repton and Trinity College, Cambridge, he was ordained in 1915. His first post was at St Mary's, Portsea. He was interviewed on 28 December 1916, for a commission as a Temporary Chaplain to the Forces and was assessed as ‘A1 bright fellow’ and sent off to join the 58th London Division in France. In May, 1917, at Bullecourt, ‘he was struck by a rifle bullet which entered below the elbow at back of Rt forearm and passed out 2” above wrist behind fracturing and partially dividing ulna nerve’. He returned to England, and efforts to make him sufficiently fit to return to active service proved unsuccessful. He had applied for a ‘wound gratuity’ as early as September, 1917, because he felt that full recovery was impossible. But successive Medical Boards did not agree with him. A temporary gratuity of £50 p.a. was agreed in 1918 and was made permanent in 1920. When he died in 1974, the pension paid £396:00p p.a. The pension was only agreed when a medical board declared the wound ‘was equivalent to an amputation'. After the War, Lang had his hand sheathed in a black glove, changing to white for confirmations. When peace returned he was successively: domestic chaplain to Cosmo Lang (his second-cousin), Archbishop of York; Chaplain to Returned Soldiers in Edmonton, Canada; and then Vicar of All Saints, Swanscombe. After this he was Warden of the Trinity College Mission, Camberwell and after that Rural Dean of Kingston before his elevation to the episcopate. Even though he had retired from Woolwich in 1947, the Archbishop of Canterbury recommended him for the vacant seat of Portsmouth in 1948, because Lang was ‘an excellent preacher and a safe pair of hands’. The Prime Minister's Secretary, however, regraded Lang's health as ‘doubtful’ and 42-year-old Launcelot Fleming was appointed. A keen educationalist, Lang continued to serve the Church as an assistant bishop of Winchester, Archdeacon of Winchester and a canon residentiary at Winchester Cathedral until his retirement in 1962; he died on 12 March 1974.

Church of England titles
Preceded by Arthur Llewellyn Preston	Bishop of Woolwich; 1936 – 1947	Succeeded by Robert William Stannard
Preceded by Hedley Burrows	Archdeacon of Winchester; 1947 – 1962	Succeeded by Roy Beynon
