= Robert Stannard (bishop) =

Anglican clergyman (1895–1986)

Robert William Stannard (20 October 1895 – 26 December 1986) was an eminent Anglican clergyman in the middle part of the 20th century.

He was born on 20 October 1895 and educated at Westminster School and, after wartime service in the Middlesex Regiment, Christ Church, Oxford. Ordained in 1922 he began his career with curacies at Bermondsey and Putney and was then Vicar of St James, Barrow-in-Furness. In 1934 he was Rural Dean of Dalton and, in the same year went on to become Rector of Bishopwearmouth. He left Bishopwearmouth in 1941 He then became Archdeacon of Doncaster and Rector of High Melton.

In 1947, he was appointed to the episcopate as Bishop of Woolwich, a post he held until his appointment as Dean of Rochester. As Dean, he was the first Warden of Rochester Theological College in 1959, before the appointment of Stuart Blanch the following year. An Honorary Chaplain to the King, he retired to Fleet, Hampshire in 1966 and died twenty years later on Boxing Day.

Church of England titles
Preceded by Leslie Lang	Bishop of Woolwich; 1947–1959	Succeeded by John Robinson
Preceded by Thomas Crick	Dean of Rochester; 1959–1966	Succeeded by Stanley Betts
