= David Gerrard (priest) =

Anglican priest, Archdeacon of Wandsworth from 1989 to 2004

David Keith Robin Gerrard (born 15 June 1939) is an Anglican priest: he was the Archdeacon of Wandsworth from 1989 to 2004.

Gerrard was educated at the Royal Grammar School, Guildford and St Edmund Hall, Oxford. He held curacies at St Olave, Woodberry Down and St Mary, Primrose Hill followed by incumbencies at St Paul, Lorrimore Square then St Andrew and St Mark, Surbiton. He was Rural Dean of Kingston upon Thames from 1983 to 1988.

Church of England titles
Preceded by Peter Bertram Coombs	Archdeacon of Wandsworth; 1989–2004	Succeeded by Stephen John Roberts
