= Bernard Jacob =

Bernard Victor Jacob (20 November 1921 – 7 December 1992) was an Archdeacon in the Anglican Diocese of Southwark from 1977 to 1988.

Jacob was educated at the Liverpool Institute and St Peter's College, Oxford. After a curacy at Middleton he was Vicar of Ulverston then Bilston. From 1964 to 1968 he was Warden of Scargill House then Rector of Mortlake. In 1977 he was appointed Archdeacon of Kingston-upon-Thames; and in 1986 of Reigate.
