= John Leeke =

English Anglican bishop

The Right Reverend John Leeke
- Bishop of Woolwich
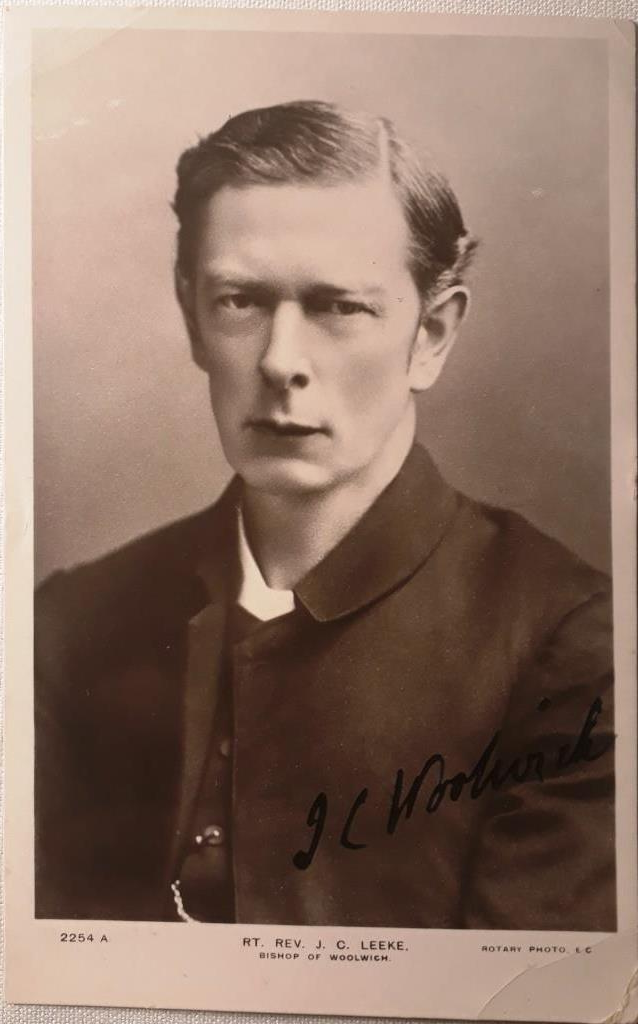
- Church: Church of England
- Diocese: Diocese of Southwark
- In office: 1905 to 1918
- Successor: William Hough

Personal details
- Born: 1843
- Died: 28 November 1919 (aged 75–76)
- Denomination: Anglicanism

John Cox Leeke (1843 – 28 November 1919) was an Anglican bishop, the inaugural Bishop of Woolwich from 1905 to 1918.

The son of William Leeke, perpetual curate at Holbrook, Derbyshire, Leeke was born there in 1843. He was educated at Trinity College, Cambridge.

Leeke was ordained in 1867. He began his career with a curacy at Wanstead after which he was appointed Rector of Kidbrook. Appointed Rural Dean of Woolwich in 1892 and then an Honorary Canon of Rochester Cathedral in 1900, he was one of three Suffragans appointed in 1905 to assist the Bishop of Southwark. He married the daughter of John Meynell, of Meynell Langley.

"An earnest and faithful worker, kind and sympathetic", he died on 28 November 1919, leaving two sons and one daughter.

Church of England titles
New title	Bishop of Woolwich; 1905–1918	Succeeded by William Hough
