= Bishop of Woolwich =

Bishop in England

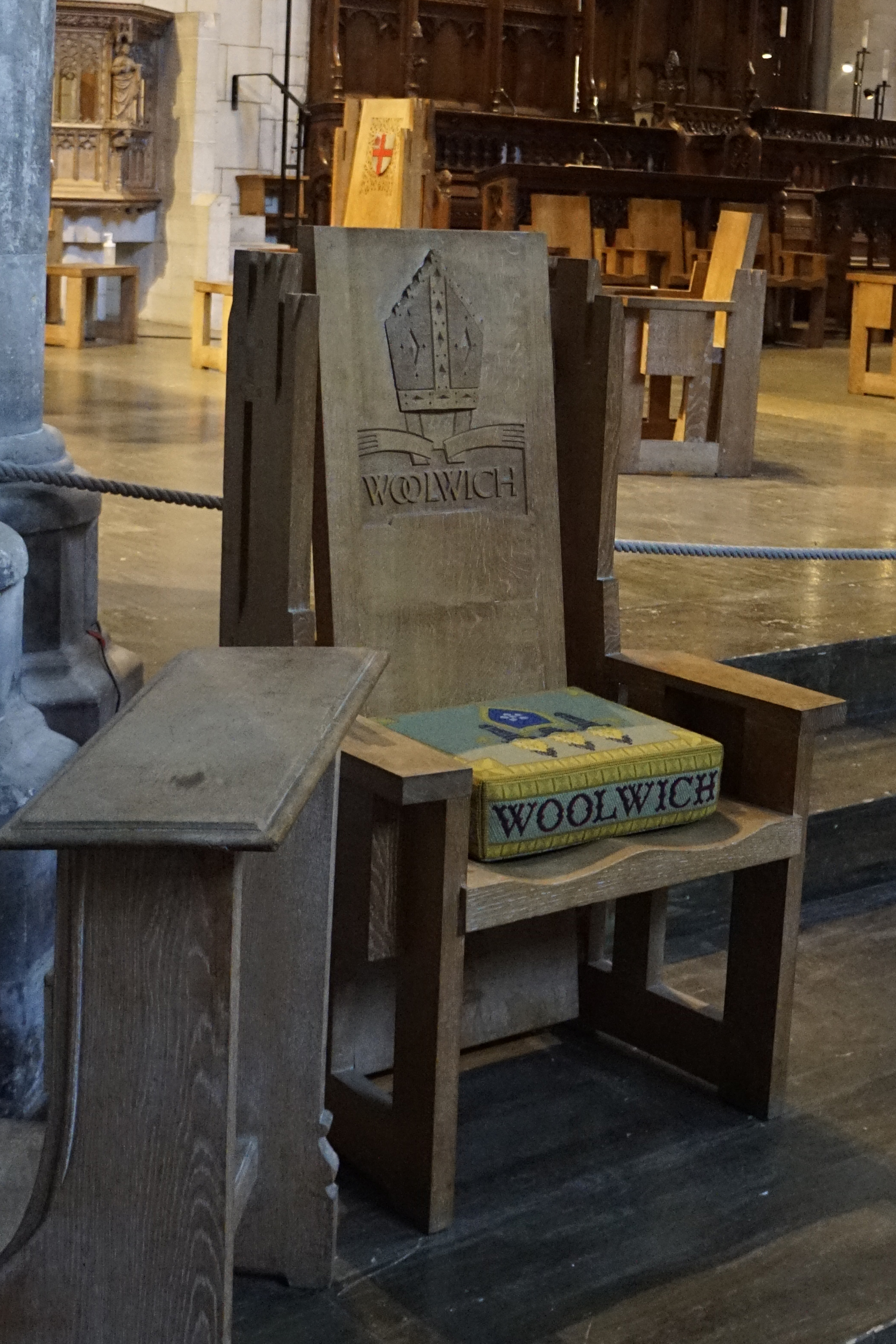
The Cathedra of Woolwich in Southworth Cathedral

The Bishop of Woolwich is an episcopal title used by an area bishop of the Church of England Diocese of Southwark, in the Province of Canterbury, England.

The title takes its name after Woolwich, a suburb of the Royal Borough of Greenwich. Two of the best known former bishops are John A. T. Robinson, who was a major figure in Liberal Christianity, and David Sheppard, the former Sussex and England cricketer who went on to become the Anglican Bishop of Liverpool. The bishops suffragan of Woolwich have been area bishops since the Southwark area scheme was founded in 1991. The current bishop is Alastair Cutting, since his consecration on 3 July 2024 at Southwark Cathedral.

== List of bishops ==
Bishops of Woolwich
From	Until	Incumbent	Notes
1905	1918	John Leeke	
1918	1932	William Hough	
1932	1936	Arthur Preston	
1936	1947	Leslie Lang	
1947	1959	Robert Stannard	
1959	1969	John Robinson	
1969	1975	David Sheppard	Translated to Liverpool
1975	1984	Michael Marshall	
1984	1996	Peter Hall	Formerly Rector of St Martin in the Bull Ring; first area bishop from 1991
1996	2005	Colin Buchanan	Formerly Bishop of Aston
2005	2011	Christopher Chessun	Translated to Southwark
2012	2016	Michael Ipgrave	Nominated on 3 February 2012 and consecrated on 21 March 2012; translated to Lichfield 10 June 2016.
2017	2023	Karowei Dorgu	Died in post, 8 September 2023.
2024	present	Alastair Cutting	Consecrated 3 July 2024
