= William Hough (bishop) =

The Rt Rev William Woodcock Hough (19 December 1859 – 8 March 1934) was an Anglican Bishop, the second Bishop of Woolwich from 1918 to 1932.

William Woodcock Hough was born into a medical family, son of the eminent surgeon James Hough, FRCS, JP. He was educated at The Perse School and Corpus Christi College, Cambridge, and began his working life as a school master at Wimborne Grammar School.

In 1885 he was ordained by the Bishop of Salisbury and was appointed to be the Curate at Hampreston. He was then in charge of the Corpus Christi College, Cambridge Mission, Old Kent Road for 13 years; Clerical Secretary of the South London Church Fund; Vicar of Lewisham; and Archdeacon of Kingston-upon-Thames before his elevation to the episcopate. He was also Archdeacon of Lewisham from 1919 to 1932

After his death on 8 March 1934, a chapel was erected to his memory at Carshalton.

== Notes ==
Church of England titles
Preceded by John Cox Leeke	Bishop of Woolwich; 1918–1932	Succeeded by Arthur Llewellyn Preston
