= Anglican Diocese of Rochester =

Diocese of the Church of England

Coordinates: 51°23′20″N 0°30′12″E

Diocese of Rochester Dioecesis Roffensis
- Coat of arms

- Flag

Location
- Ecclesiastical province: Canterbury
- Archdeaconries: Bromley & Bexley, Rochester, Tonbridge

Statistics
- Parishes: 218
- Churches: 268

Information
- Cathedral: Rochester Cathedral; St Saviour's Pro-Cathedral, Southwark (1897–1905)
- Language: English

Current leadership
- Bishop: Jonathan Gibbs, Bishop of Rochester
- Suffragan: Simon Burton-Jones, Bishop of Tonbridge
- Archdeacons: Allie Kerr, Archdeacon of Bromley & Bexley; Sandra McCalla, Archdeacon of Rochester; Nick Cornell, Archdeacon of Tonbridge

Website
- rochester.anglican.org

The Diocese of Rochester is a Church of England diocese in the English county of Kent and the Province of Canterbury. The cathedral church of the diocese is Rochester Cathedral in the former city of Rochester. The bishop's Latin episcopal signature is: " (firstname) Roffen", Roffensis being the Latinised adjective referring to Rochester.

An ancient diocese, it was established with the authority of King Æthelberht of Kent by Augustine of Canterbury in 604 at the same time as the see of London. Only the adjacent Diocese of Canterbury is older in England. Its establishment was the first part of an unrealised plan conceived by Pope Gregory the Great for Augustine of Canterbury to consecrate 12 bishops in different places and another 12 for the prospective see (later province) of York.

The Rochester diocese includes 268 parish churches throughout:

- the western part of the county of Kent
- the London Borough of Bexley
- the London Borough of Bromley;

The diocese is subdivided into three archdeaconries:

- Archdeaconry of Bromley & Bexley (Archdeacon: Allie Kerr)
- Archdeaconry of Rochester (Archdeacon: Sandra McCalla)
- Archdeaconry of Tonbridge (Archdeacon: Nick Cornell);

The current diocesan boundaries roughly match its pre-19th century extent. On 1 January 1846 parishes in Hertfordshire from the dioceses of Lincoln and of London and Essex (from London diocese) were added to Rochester, while all West Kent parishes except those in the Rochester Deanery were transferred to the Diocese of Canterbury. In May 1877, Essex and Hertfordshire became part of the newly created Diocese of St Albans. On 1 August 1877, the Diocese of Rochester gained some northern parts of Surrey from the Diocese of Winchester and the Diocese of London which were later transferred to the Diocese of Southwark at its creation in 1905.

== Bishops ==
The Bishop of Rochester is Jonathan Gibbs since the confirmation of his election, on 24 May 2022. The diocese also has a suffragan bishop: Simon Burton-Jones, Bishop of Tonbridge; the suffragan see of Tonbridge was created in 1959. Since 1994 the Bishop of Fulham (Jonathan Baker from 2013) has provided "alternative episcopal oversight" in the diocese (as well as in the London and Southwark dioceses) to parishes which do not accept the ordination of women to the priesthood. Baker is licensed as an honorary assistant bishop in the diocese for this ministry.

In addition to the diocesan and suffragan bishops, there are a number of other bishops licensed in the diocese:

- 2010–present: Stephen Venner, a retired Bishop of Dover, former Bishop for the Falkland Islands and Bishop to the Forces who lives in St Albans, Hertfordshire, where he is licensed as an honorary assistant bishop. Venner is also licensed in the Diocese in Europe.
- 2010–present: Michael Turnbull, a retired former Bishop of Durham and Bishop of Rochester who lives in Sandwich in the neighbouring Diocese of Canterbury, where he is also licensed.
- 2011–present: Graham Cray, a retired Archbishops' Missioner and "Fresh Expressions" team leader and formerly Suffragan Bishop of Maidstone who lives in Harrietsham in the Canterbury diocese where he is also licensed.

== See also ==
- List of churches in the London Borough of Bromley
