= St James's Church, New Malden =

Anglican church in Greater London, England

St James, New Malden
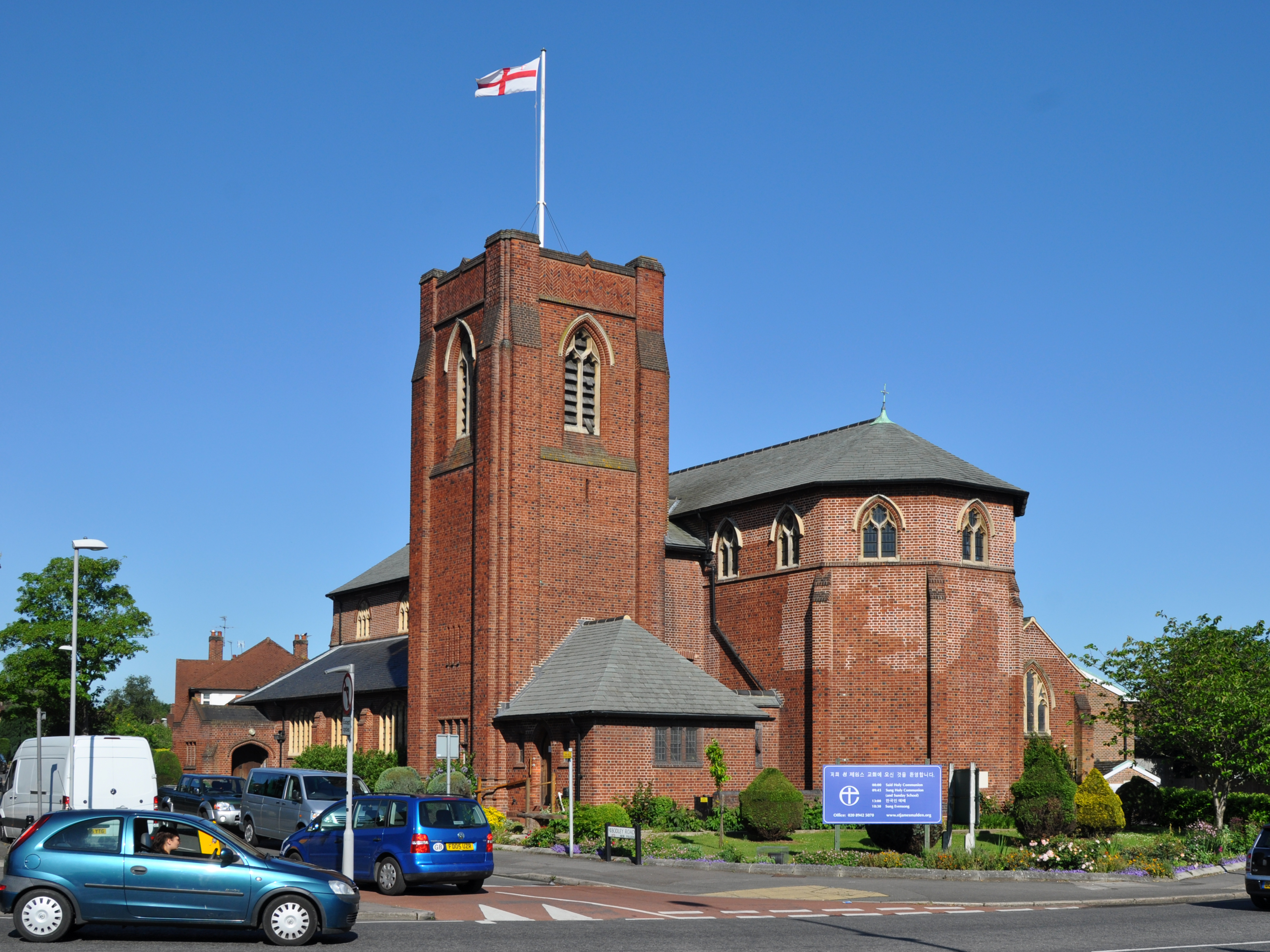
- St James in 2016
- St James, New Malden
- 51.3952°N 0.2547°W
- Location: Malden Road, New Malden, Royal Borough of Kingston upon Thames, Greater London
- Country: England
- Denomination: Church of England
- Website: stjamesmalden.org

History
- Founded: 1929
- Consecrated: 20 September 1933

Architecture
- Heritage designation: Grade II
- Architect(s): J.E. Newberry and C.W. Fowler

Administration
- Diocese: Southwark

Clergy
- Vicar: Katie Thomas

St James's Church is an Anglo-Catholic parish church on the corner of Bodley Road in the suburb of New Malden in the Royal Borough of Kingston upon Thames, Greater London. Built between 1931 and 1933, St James's is part of the Church of England and is located in the Kingston Episcopal Area of the Diocese of Southwark. As of March 2026, the current vicar is Katie Thomas, serving since 2018.

The church was built as a part of the Diocese of Southwark's "Twenty Five Churches" fund to the design of J.E. Newberry and C.W. Fowler, but was damaged in an air raid during World War II in 1944. It was restored by Fowler in 1954. In March 2010, the building was granted Grade II listed status.

== History ==
The first church in New Malden dedicated to St James was only a temporary church built in Poplar Walk, now Poplar Grove, in the early 1860s. This was quickly replaced by Christ Church, New Malden. However, due to the rapid expansion of the local area, a "daughter" Mission Church on Burlington Road was formed in 1903 with a revived dedication to St James.

In 1929, a separate parish for St James was formed on the boundaries of Old and New Malden. The first vicar was Rev. G.M. Longsdon, who took charge in 1929 in the Mission Church. Led by the Bishop of Southwark at the time, Cyril Garbett, an initiative called the "Twenty Five Churches Fund" was created, aimed at assisting funding of new churches in the area. St James was awarded a grant towards the cost of a new church, with the Bishop of Southwark nominated as patron. A plot adjacent to the church site was also purchased with the intention of constructing a church hall at a later time. As a result, a new church was built between 1931 and 1933 by the architects J.E. Newberry and C.W. Fowler, and consecrated on 20 September 1933. The fund closed in 1934, making St James one of the last churches to be built under the scheme.

In 1944, the church suffered bomb damage, which also damaged an 1820s Bryceson pipe organ and the font. The organ was later refurbished, whilst the font was restored with a later cover to Fowler's designs.

On 4 March 2010, the building was awarded Grade II listed building status due to its architectural interest, the materials used, the intactness despite the war damage, and the historic interest as one of the 25 churches from the "Twenty Five Churches" fund.

== Architecture ==
The church is designed in a "restrained", stripped-down version of the Perpendicular Gothic Revival style. This was characteristic of suburban Anglican churches of the interwar era and also of the work of Newberry and Fowler, who went into partnership in 1927 and designed several churches in Greater London in the next 12 years. The walls are of brick – red outside, with plain buff brickwork inside – and there are stone dressings. The roofs are laid with slates. Internal fittings are of oak and pine; they are mostly original, and were designed by Newberry.

The church is seven bays long, with a five-bay nave and two-bay chancel. The chancel has a tower, rising to four stages, linked to its south side, and a side chapel on the north side, also of two bays. There are entrance porches on both sides of the nave at its west end, and the nave is flanked by aisles on both sides. The sanctuary has an apsidal end and buttresses.

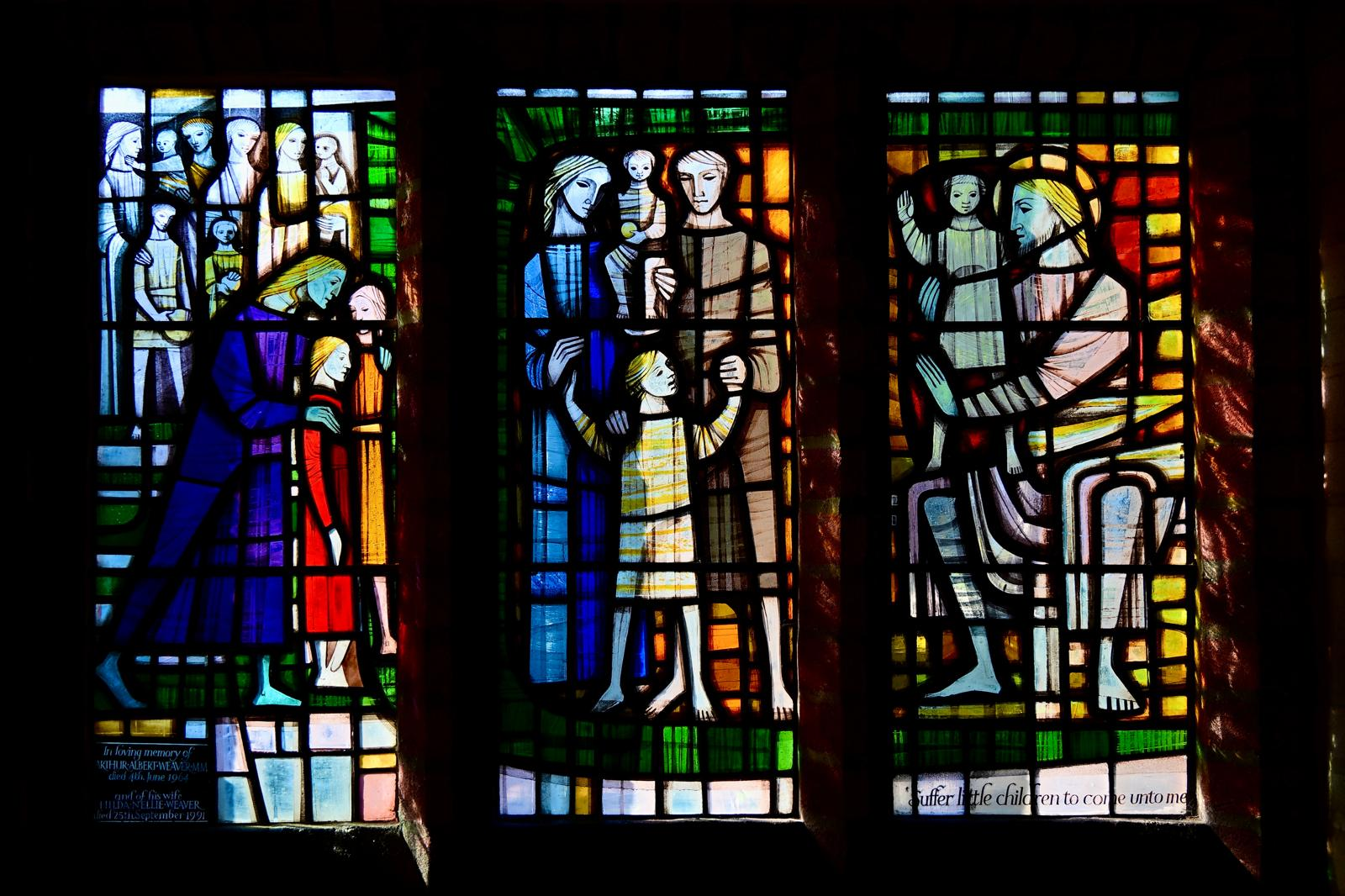
South porch window by John Hayward, 1964

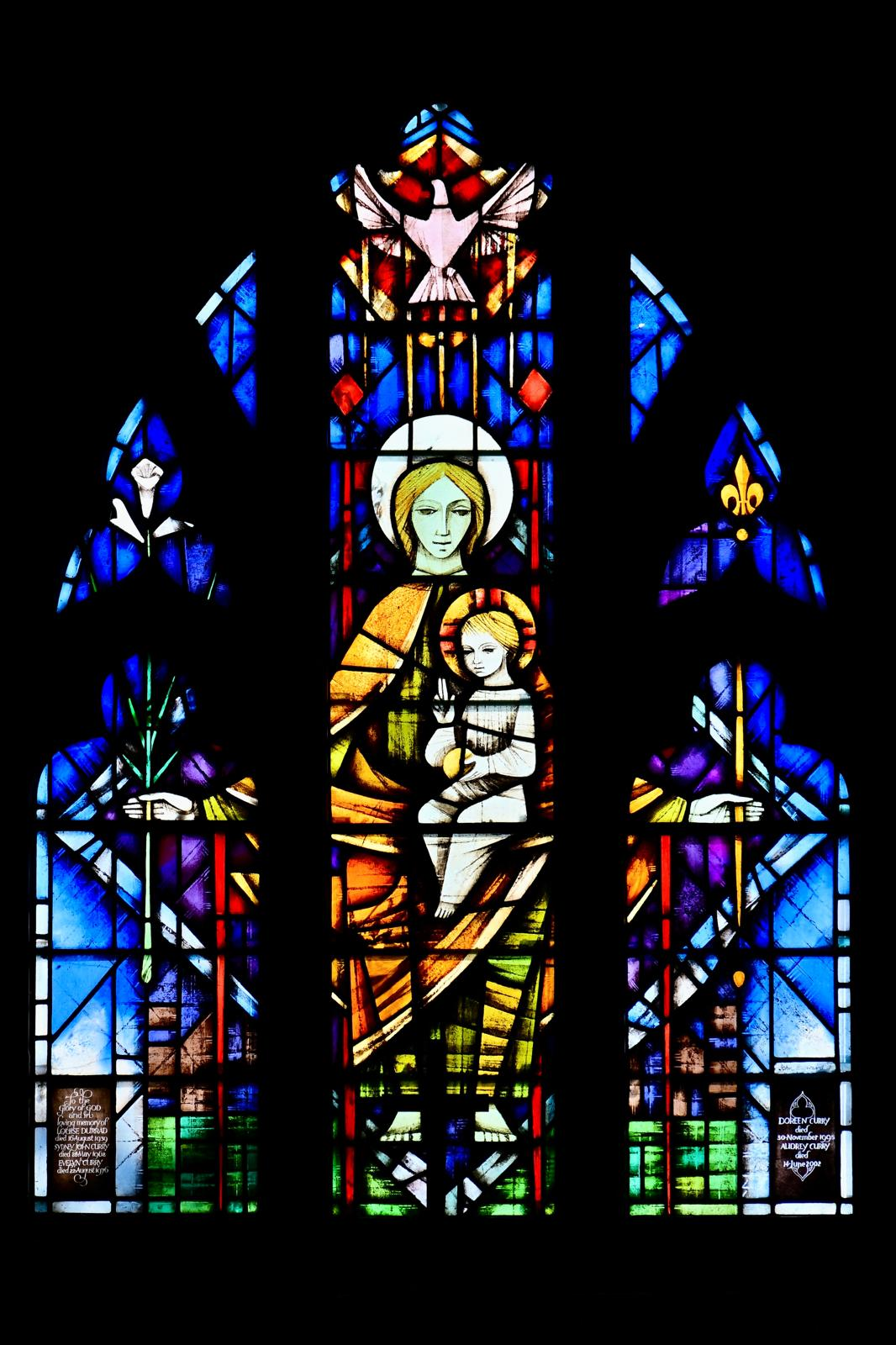
Lady Chapel window by John Hayward, 1965

St James’s Church is home to two modern stained glass memorial windows by the English post-war ecclesiastical artist John Hayward. In the south porch is his 1964 window, which takes as its theme the words of Jesus from Matthew 19:14: “Suffer little children, and forbid them not, to come unto me”. The following year, Hayward glazed the east window in the Lady chapel with a depiction of the Virgin and Child.

== Community ==
Despite the parish being Anglo-Catholic in nature, the church hosts a variety of contemporary services. This includes pet-friendly services, aimed to encourage further community participation.

The church is also a member of "Churches Together in Malden", which aims to promote stronger connections and greater engagement between worship and community activities across the area.

The Church hall is host the local units of Rainbows, Brownies, Beavers and Scouts as the sponsor of 7th Malden. Additionally, the hall also hosts the local drama group St James's Players, established in 1966.

== See also ==
- Media related to St James' Church, New Malden at Wikimedia Commons
