= Holy Trinity Church, Tulse Hill =

Church in Tulse Hill, London, England

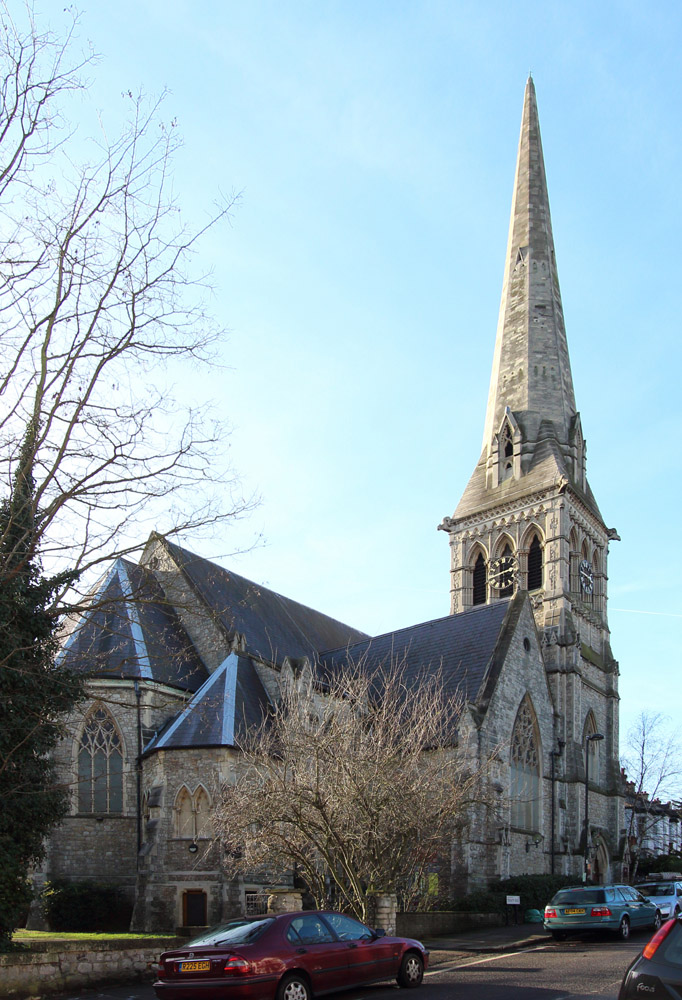
- Holy Trinity Church, Tulse Hill
- 51°26′42.2″N 0°6′33.8″W
- Denomination: Church of England
- Website: www.htth.org.uk

Architecture
- Architect: Thomas Denville Barry

Administration
- Province: Canterbury
- Diocese: Diocese of Southwark
- Archdeaconry: Lambeth
- Deanery: Lambeth South Deanery

Clergy
- Vicar: Rev Richard Dormandy

Holy Trinity Church, Trinity Rise, in the Tulse Hill area of the London Borough of Lambeth, is a Grade II Listed Building

== The parish ==
During the first half of the 19th century, a significant proportion of the area now included in the parish was developed with substantial villas set in generous grounds. The parish of Holy Trinity was formed in 1856 from portions of the parishes of St Luke West Norwood, St Matthew Brixton and St Leonard's, Streatham.

In 1886, the population of the parish amounted to 6,302 and was served by three clergy. The total (morning and evening) attendance as a proportion of the parochial population at that time stood at 23.2%.

In 1901, the population of the area then included in the parish stood at 4,176. In the following year, there were two clergymen at Holy Trinity and total attendance at its services represented 22.6% of the parochial population.

Based on statistics from the UK census, the Diocese of Southwark estimates the population of Holy Trinity & St Matthias parish was 11,000 in 2001 and 13,700 in 2011.

John Sentamu, later Archbishop of York, was vicar of Holy Trinity Church for 13 years.

== Building ==
Holy Trinity Church is built of load-bearing brickwork, faced with Kentish ragstone and has a slated roof. The architectural style is of the 14th-century style. The aisled nave, transepts and chancel with an apse are arranged so that no internal pillars block the congregation's view of the pulpit and altar. Entrance to the building is from the north side, under a tower which supports a broach spire of dressed bath stone. Three windows in the apse (north, east and south) are by the stained glass artist Clare Dawson, pupil and co-worker of M. E. Aldrich Rope.
