= Christ's Chapel of God's Gift =

Coordinates: 51.4463°N 0.0857°W

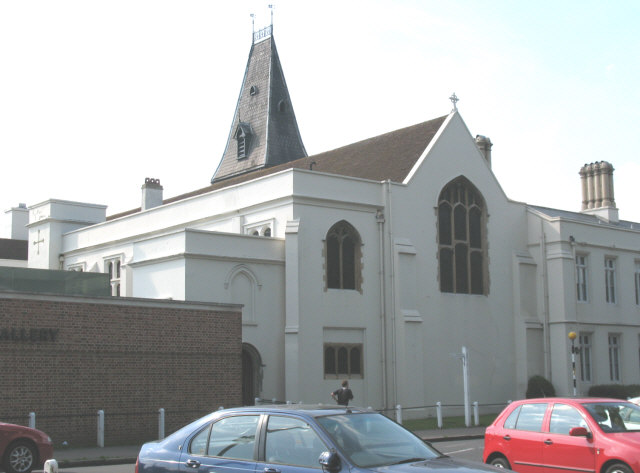
- Christ's Chapel of God's Gift

- Location of Christ's Chapel of God's Gift
- Country: England
- Denomination: Church of England
- Website: www.stbarnabasdulwich.org/christ-s-chapel

Administration
- Province: Canterbury
- Diocese: Southwark

Christ's Chapel of God's Gift is a church in Dulwich, a district of London, within the College of God's Gift complex.

It was consecrated in 1616 by George Abbot, Archbishop of Canterbury, as the centre of Edward Alleyn's College of God's Gift which was to be established in 1619. It is one of two churches in the parish of Dulwich in the Archdeaconry of Southwark, more formally known as the Parish of St Barnabas with Christ's Chapel, together with St Barnabas' Church, Dulwich.

The organ, built in 1759, is the oldest surviving organ built by George England.

== Gallery ==
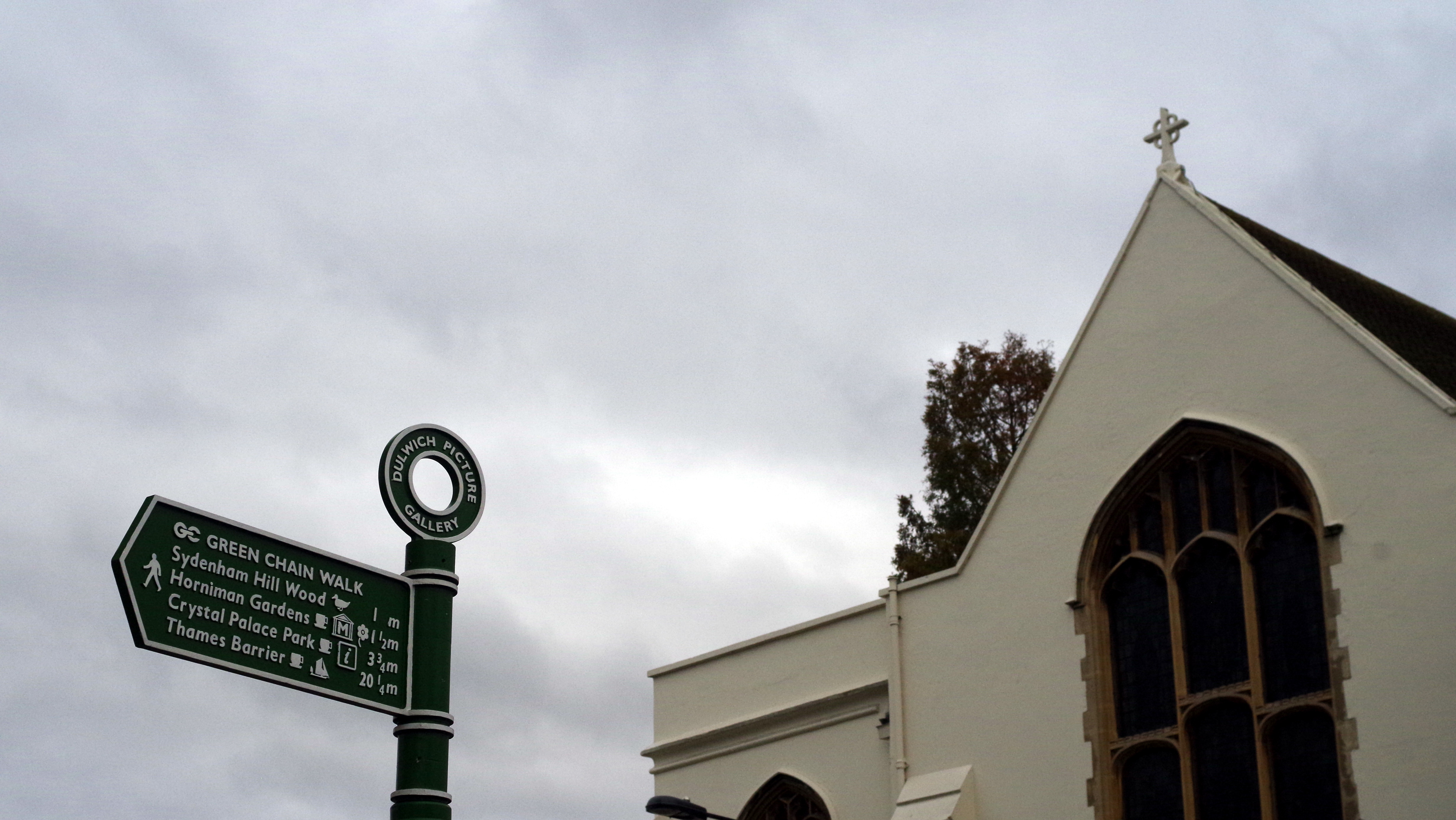

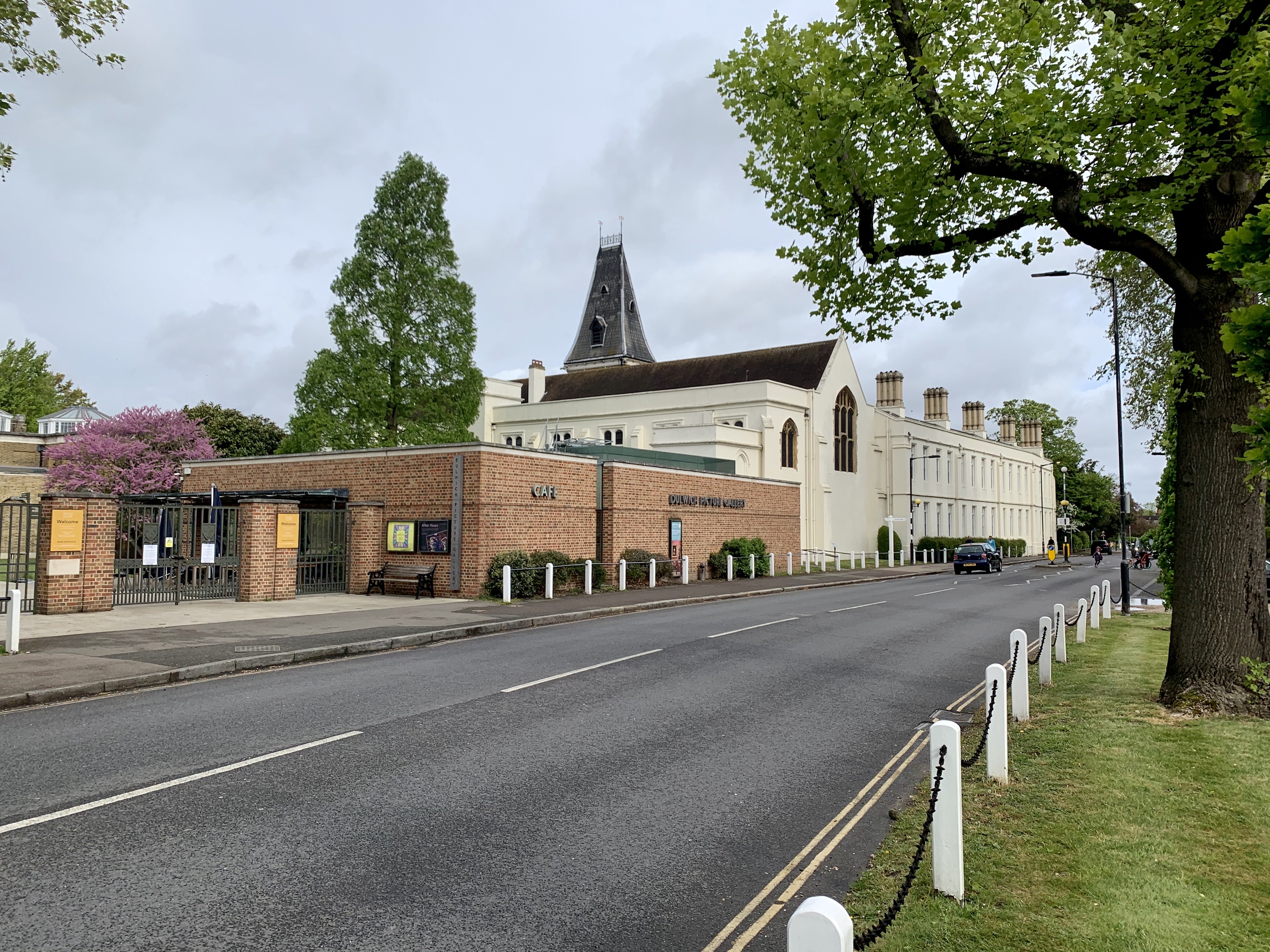
With the Dulwich Picture Gallery
