= All Saints Church, Peckham =

Church in Peckham, London

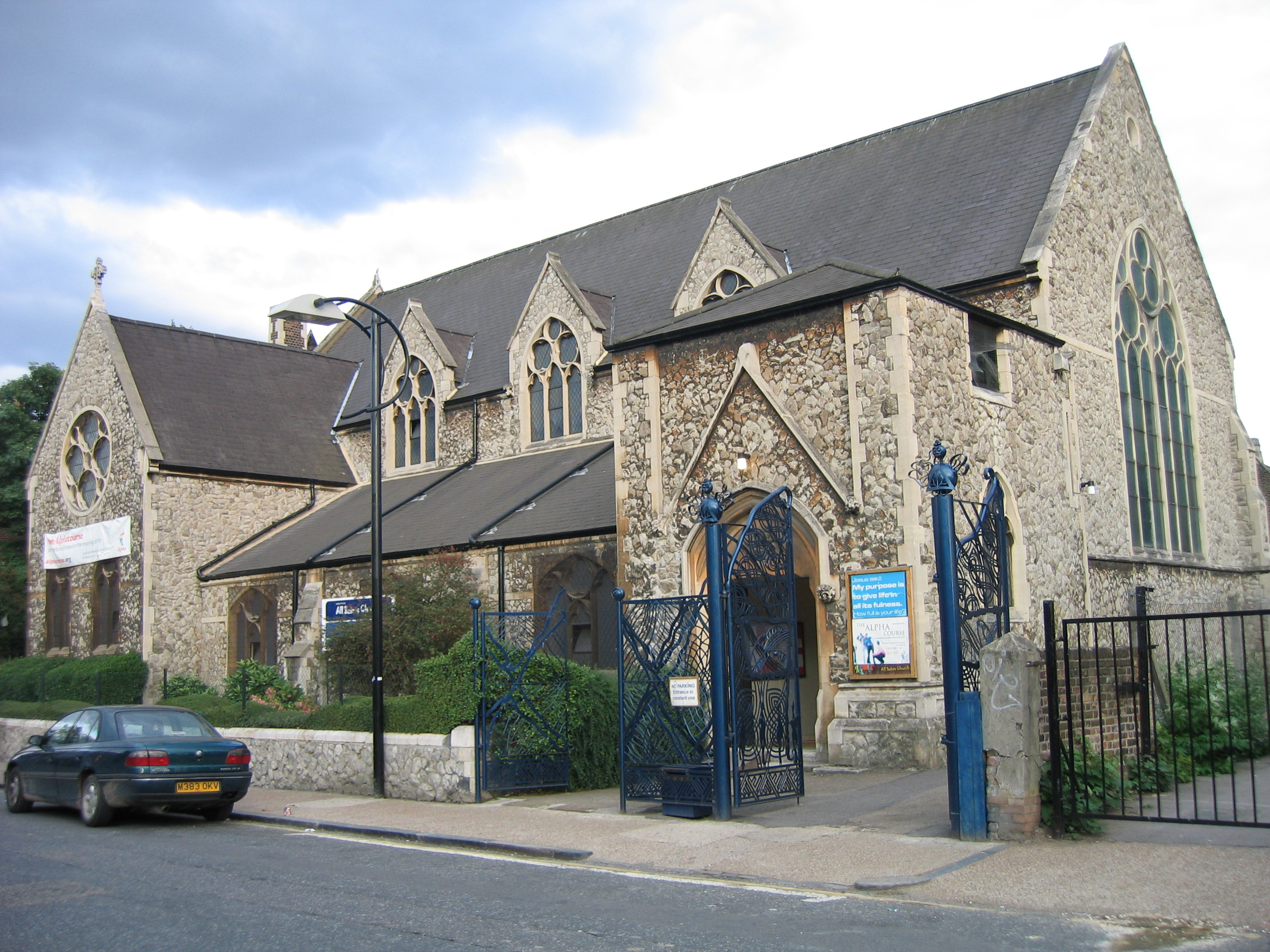
All Saints Church, Peckham

All Saints Church is an Evangelical Anglican church in Blenheim Grove, Peckham, London. It is part of Camberwell Deanery within the Anglican Diocese of Southwark in the Church of England. On the verge of closing down in 1996 due to a dwindling congregation, the church has grown rapidly over the last decade and now has a membership of over 400 adults.

== History ==
The church started in 1867, when Peckham was a village on the edge of Camberwell and a haven outside the intense bustle of Victorian London. Within a few years the church had grown from about 20 people, meeting in the vicar's sitting room, to over 600 adults in the congregation. There was also a children's service for 800 children on Sunday afternoons. The church hall and the church building were completed in 1872. The church has pews for around 400 people, with space in the side aisles for an additional 150 to 200 people.(Pews replaced by chairs in 2016).

The church grew rapidly in the early 20th century but, like many inner-city London churches, declined after World War II. By the mid-1990s, the church congregation had fallen in number to a small handful of members. The church was no longer viable and plans were made to sell the land for housing but to incorporate a small worship centre for the remaining members on the site.

In 1996, a last-ditch effort was made to save the church. The diocese appointed the Revd Bob Hurley (who had been on the staff at Holy Trinity Brompton in South Kensington) as vicar. Hurley believed that "God had a plan that All Saints could be full again on Sundays" and, with the rest of the small congregation, was determined to fight the closure plans. The then Bishop of Southwark agreed to Hurley's proposal that within two years he would double the congregation of 20 people and install a heating system in the church or else the church would close. Hurley rose to the challenge and both targets were achieved within six months - the threat of closure was removed and the church grew rapidly in the years that followed. Hurley has recorded the turnaround in a book.

In 2002, Hurley moved to five rural parishes near Salisbury and in 2003 the Revd Francis Orr-Ewing (previously a curate at St Aldate's Church in Oxford) was appointed as vicar. During his time as vicar the number of people attending All Saints grew considerably, the staff team expanded and the outreach and public profile of the church increased significantly.

Orr-Ewing stepped down as vicar in May 2010 to lead a new church in Buckinghamshire. His final service was broadcast live on BBC1 as a Pentecost service. Two further services, BBC Songs of Praise services, "Peckham Praise" and "Urban Hope", were subsequently recorded and broadcast in September 2010 and February 2011.

In July 2011, All Saints welcomed the Revd Jonathan Mortimer as their new vicar. Mortimer spent the previous four years working with churches across Britain for ‘Through Faith Missions’, an organisation helping churches with their local mission. Before that he was a team rector in a parish of four churches in Crawley.

On 14 August 2011, the church hosted a meeting of civic, community and faith leaders, followed by a packed Service for Peace organised jointly with Southwark for Jesus and XLP as a response to the rioting in Peckham. Leaders taking part in the service included Simon Hughes MP, the Bishop of Southwark, Shadrach Ofosuware (Pastor of Freedom Centre International, Peckham), the Borough Police Commander, Patrick Regan (Director of XLP), Phil Stokes (Chair of Southwark for Jesus) and the Revd Jonathan Mortimer (All Saints Peckham). During the service, a text message of support was sent by London Mayor, Boris Johnson.

As of 2015, the church is currently in the process of commissioning a feasibility study to look how the church and its congregations can best continue to serve Peckham by ‘making space for good in Peckham’.

== Worship ==
All Saints has two services each Sunday, a morning service at 10.30am and an evening service at 6pm, preceded by a cafe at 5.30pm. There is also a midweek service on Tuesdays at 11.15am. The services reflect the New Wine/Soul Survivor style of worship. In 2005, the Church released Your Favour, its first live worship CD.

== Homegroups ==
Over the last decade, homegroups have played a vital role in the life of All Saints, enabling 'church' to happen during the week around the local area. As the number of people attending All Saints has increased, the number of homegroups has also risen.

== Social outreach ==
Through its many kids and youth clubs and involvement with many schools, All Saints has regular weekly contact with around 600 children. The church has also been involved in three major missions in the local area over the last few years - 'Soul in the City' in 2004 and 'God Loves Peckham' in 2006 and 2007. Between 2007 and 2009, All Saints ran both a drama class and a football class for 5-11 year olds at the Bradfield Club in Commercial Way, as well as partnering with the club during their summer outreach weeks.

Prince Charles, who visited the church in July 2010, paid tribute to the church's social outreach. His visit was included in the BBC Songs of Praise episodes broadcast in September 2010 and February 2011.

== Name ==
The official name of the church is All Saints, Camberwell, but apart from administrative issues with the Diocese, it is always known as All Saints Peckham.

== Affiliations ==
As well as being part of the Anglican Diocese of Southwark, All Saints is a member of:

- the New Wine Network
- the Evangelical Alliance
- Fusion (student movement).
