= St Barnabas' Church, Dulwich =

Coordinates: 51.4528°N 0.0823°W

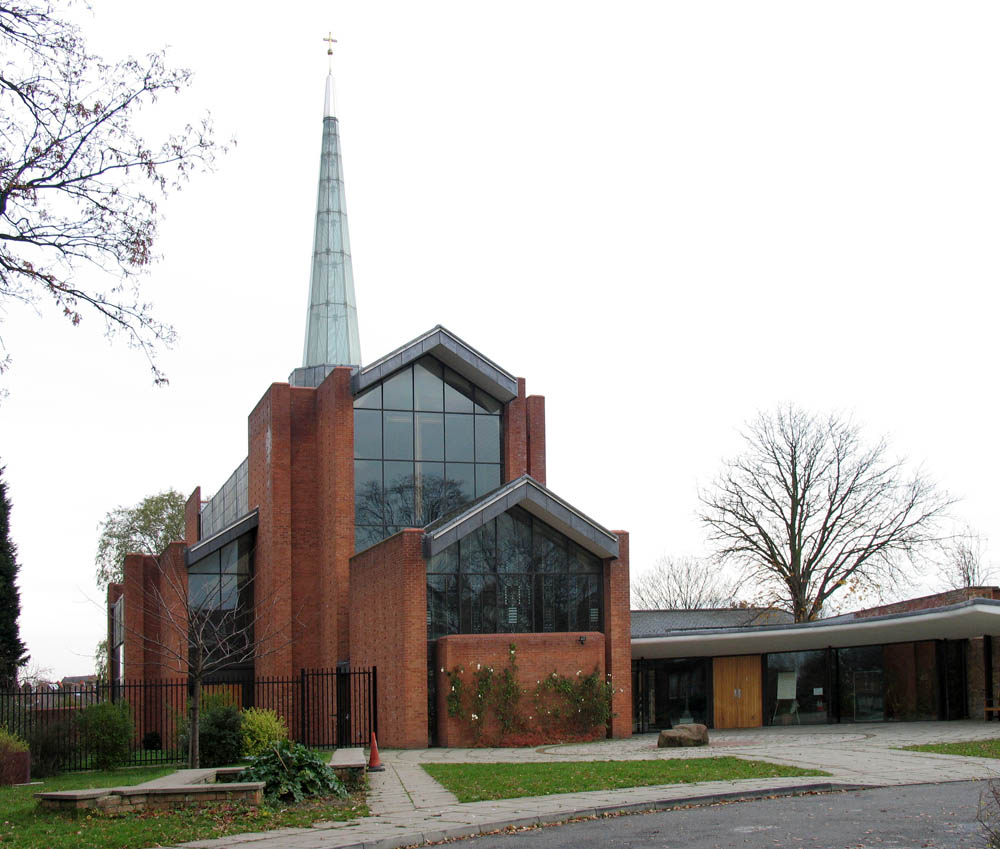
- St Barnabas' Church, Dulwich

- Location of St Barnabas'
- Country: England
- Denomination: Church of England
- Website: www.stbarnabasdulwich.org/

History
- Dedication: Saint Barnabas

Administration
- Province: Canterbury
- Diocese: Southwark

St Barnabas' Church, Dulwich, is the parish church of Dulwich, a district of London which forms part of the London Borough of Southwark. The church is dedicated to Barnabas, one of the disciples. The original church was built in 1892–95, as the parish church for the new Parish of Dulwich, today known as the Parish of St Barnabas with Christ's Chapel, Dulwich. It remains one of two churches in the parish of Dulwich in the Archdeaconry of Southwark, more formally known as the Parish of St Barnabas with Christ's Chapel, together with the Christ's Chapel of God's Gift.

The church was destroyed by fire on 7 December 1992, and the ruins were demolished in early 1993. It was rebuilt in 1995–96, designed by the American architect's firm HOK. The stained glass was designed and installed by Caroline Swash, with a grant from Arts Council England. The organ is by Kenneth Tickell.

== Gallery ==
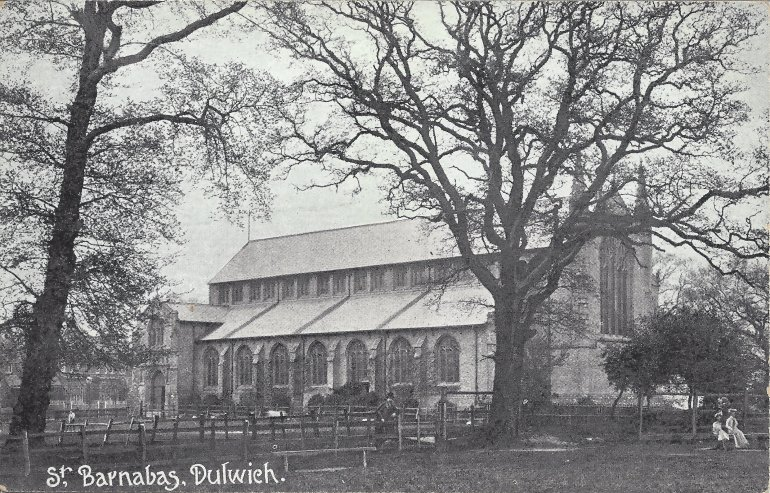
The old St Barnabas church, before the tower was built

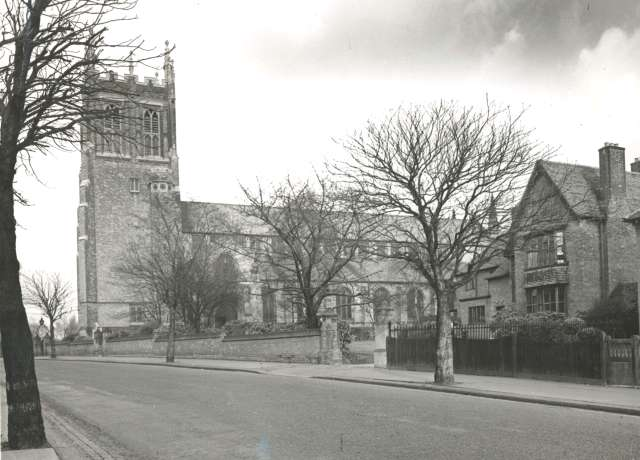
The old St Barnabas church, after the building of the tower in 1904

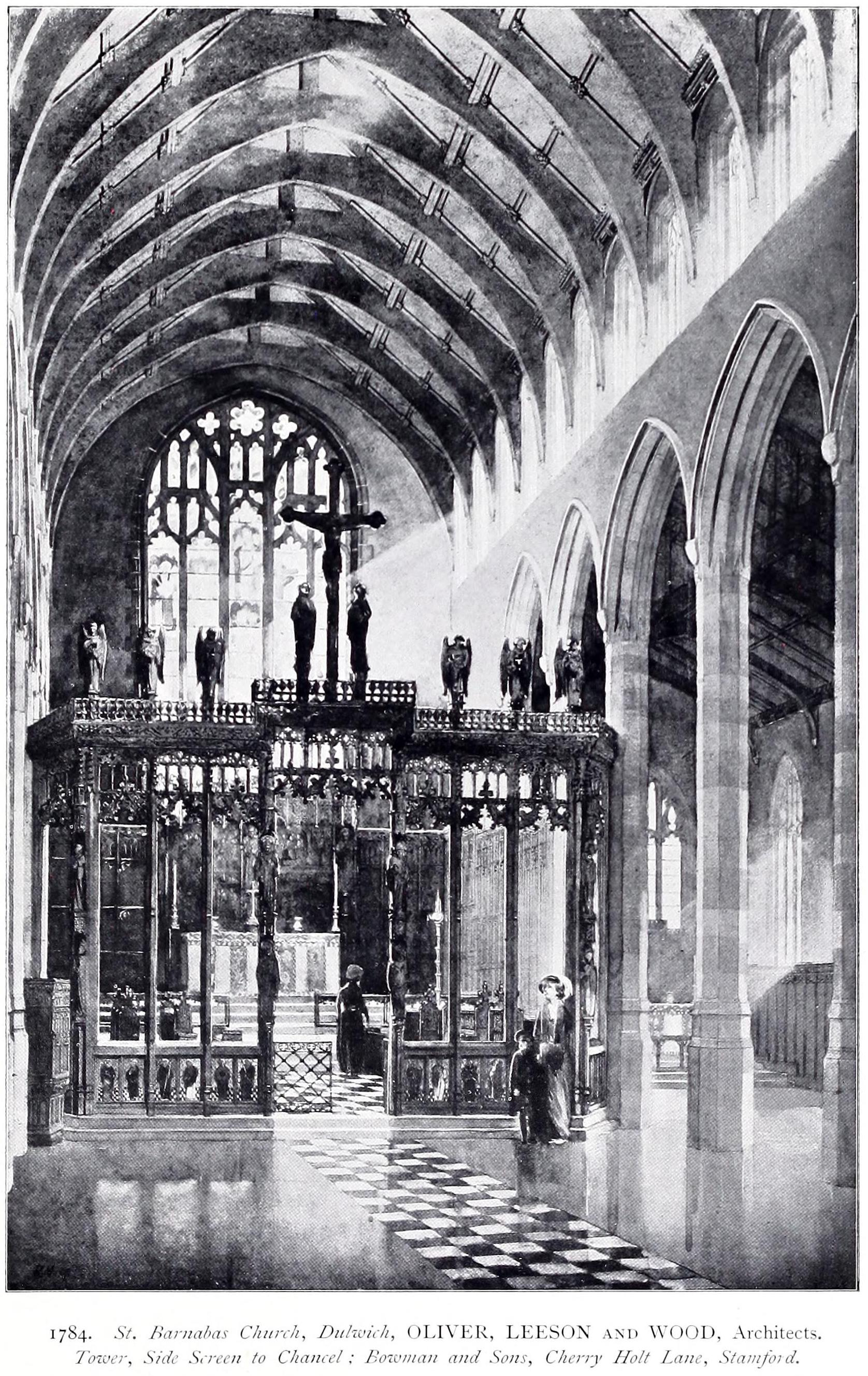
The inside of the church in 1908
