= Kenneth Tickell =

English pipe organ builder and organist (1956–2014)

Kenneth Hugh Tickell (25 August 1956–24 July 2014) was an English pipe organ builder and organist who, over 32 years, built several notable organs, including at Eton College, Worcester Cathedral, Keble College and Lincoln's Inn chapel. His last design, at Manchester Cathedral, was completed after his death.

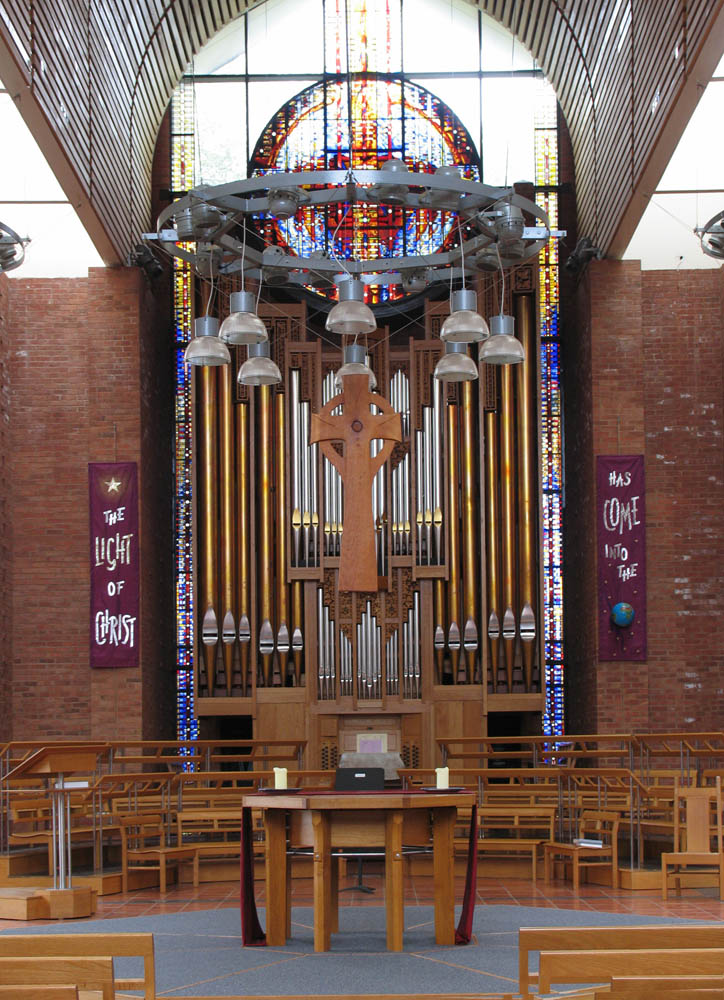
Tickell organ at St Barnabas, Dulwich

Tickell was born in Lancashire in 1956. Having first learned the violin, he began playing the organ, before entering Coventry School of Music. In 1976 he won an organ scholarship to the University of Hull, where his teachers included Simon Lindley; he graduated in 1978, by which time he had earned the Fellowship of the Royal College of Organists (FRCO), and married Philippa (Pippa) James. Tickell had practical engineering skills as well as musical ability. In 1977 he assisted with the assembly of a Holdich organ in a Hull church, and after graduating he joined the staff of builder Grant, Degens and Bradbeer, in Northampton, intending to learn the trade of organ building and especially voicing. One of his earliest tasks was alterations to a 1966 Walker organ at the chapel of Downing College, Cambridge.

By 1982, GD&B was in decline, and Tickell left to establish his own firm, Kenneth Tickell and Company, in a converted barn, still in Northampton, where he also worked as parish organist. He was a careful businessman and built up over three years, during which he moved to a former baker's shop, before building his first complete instrument, which he displayed at the St Albans International Organ Festival in 1985. Here he met John Rowntree, a consultant on many organ schemes in Roman Catholic churches, and the two worked together on several of his early projects, notably including his Opus 26, at Douai Abbey, near Reading. This marked an inflexion in the business: Tickell never stopped making chamber instruments and smaller organs, but they moved into new, larger premises, and the staff grew to nine or ten as larger commissions began to arrive. Like Peter Collins, Tickell was known for striking casework designs, though he would also work to more traditional styles, or within existing casework, where required. In the mid 1990s he met an American lecturer, Bruce Case, who was on an exchange at Cranfield Institute of Technology. Case wanted to learn woodworking skills, and Tickell traded this for expertise in computer aided design, which he then used to develop and execute designs more quickly and consistently. This, alongside his careful approach to business and especially contract writing, led to a reputation for delivering on time and on budget, sometimes despite the client.

In 1997 he co-founded, and was elected President of, the Institute of British Organ Building, and also completed a large three-manual instrument for the new St Barnabas' Church, Dulwich. This was followed by similarly sized instruments at Eton College Chapel and Cheltenham Ladies' College.

For the organ at Worcester Cathedral, a 4-manual 57-stop instrument completed in 2008, he departed from his preference for tracker action and used instead an electric action. This was widely praised by players, and also used for the Manchester Cathedral organ, where it allows for a mobile console for performances, but most of the rest of his projects were still trackers, and he kept up a steady stream of small instruments and continuo organs, for which he became especially known.

In all, Tickell built 82 organs over 30 years, becoming one of the most successful organ builders in the UK, alongside Collins, Mander, Harrison and Walker. On 24 July 2014, he died suddenly and unexpectedly of a pulmonary embolism. The workshop was then working on a commission for Manchester Cathedral, and also a replacement for the Downing College organ he had refurbished as one of his first jobs. The Manchester organ was completed by Tickell's staff, notably Simon Brown (voicing) and Tomas Jansky (technical design), and was handed over in April 2017.

The company continued for a few years after his death, completing a small number of instruments, before being wound up in 2020.

He was commemorated with a memorial evensong and recital at Worcester Cathedral.
