= St Nicholas Church, Deptford =

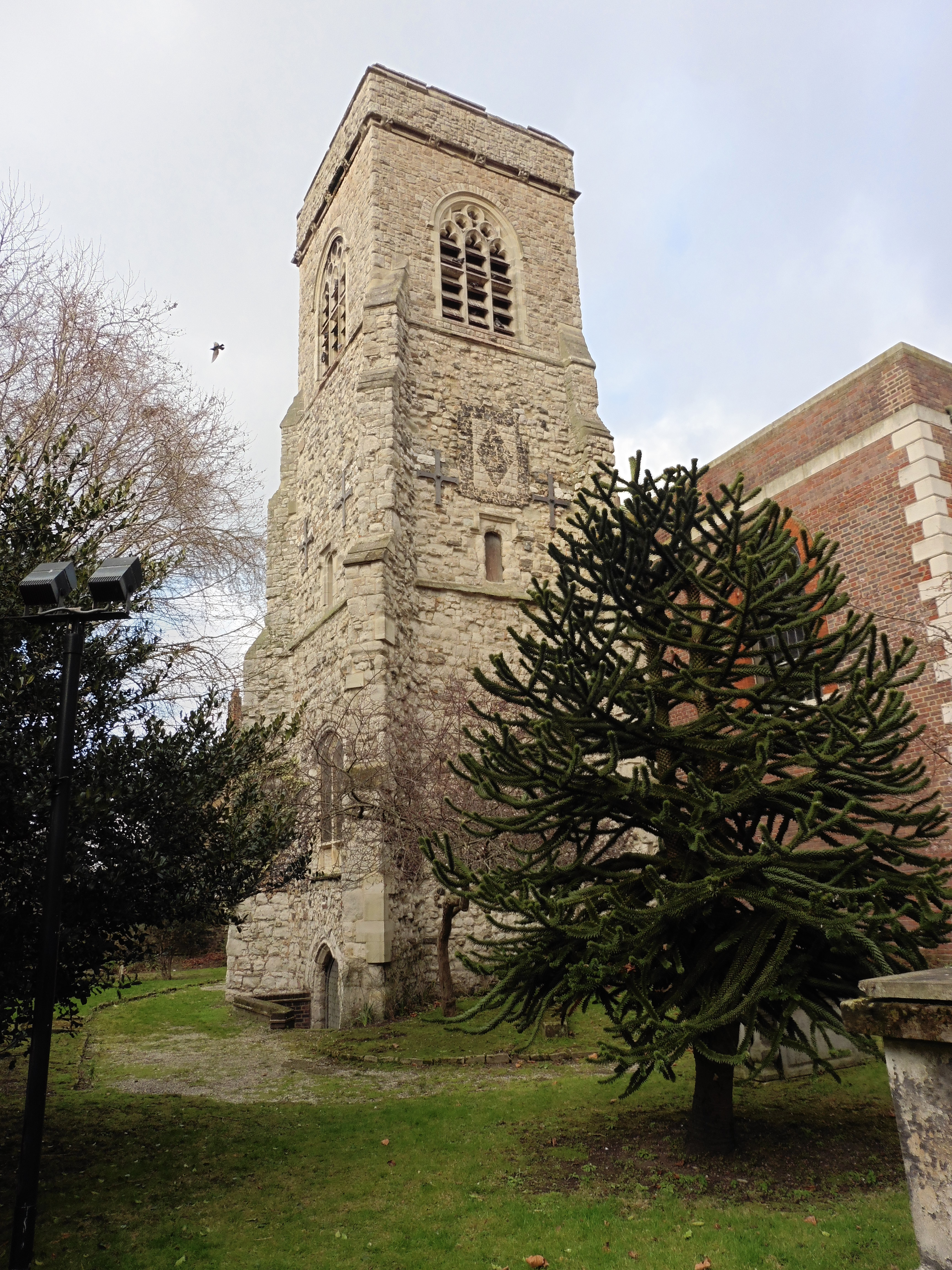
- The church's c. 1500 west tower – its upper stage was damaged in a gale and rebuilt in 1903–1904.
- St Nicholas Church, Deptford
- 51.4820°N 0.0227°W
- OS grid reference: TQ 37396 77745
- Location: Deptford Green, Greenwich, London
- Country: England
- Denomination: Church of England
- Website: www.stnicholasdeptford.org.uk

Architecture
- Style: Tudor (tower); English Baroque (body)

Administration
- Province: Canterbury
- Diocese: Southwark
- Archdeaconry: Lewisham & Greenwich
- Deanery: Deptford
- Parish: St Nicholas and St Luke, Deptford

Clergy
- Priest: Jane Petrie

St Nicholas Church was the original parish church for the settlement of Deptford in south-east London. Its cemetery includes the unmarked graves of Christopher Marlowe and three sons of John Evelyn. The ancient and civil parish centred on this church is Deptford St Nicholas.

First built in the 13th century, the current brick structure dates to 1697, the same date as the oak reredos, organ case by Bernard Smith, a wood relief carving of the Vision of the Valley of Dry Bones (originally above the entrance to the charnel house) and oak royal coat of arms above the chancel arch were all installed.

Surviving interior monuments include that of Roger, son of Richard Boyle, 1st Earl of Cork. Structural repairs were made in 1716. Around 1791 a painted glass oval was added to the reredos, and in 1875 the church's interior decoration was renewed. Around 1910 a stair tower and eastern extension were added and the upper parts of the wall rebuilt.

It was badly damaged in October 1940 during the Blitz, and from 1955 to 1958 extensive restoration was carried out, the nave's east bay and the chancel converted to parish rooms and the reredos moved to its current position. It was Grade II* listed in 1951.
