= George England (organ builder) =

George England (fl. 1740–1788), was an English organ-builder.

== Family ==
He married the daughter of Richard Bridge (another organ-builder) and was the father of George Pike England (1765?–1814), who also became an organ-builder.

== Works ==
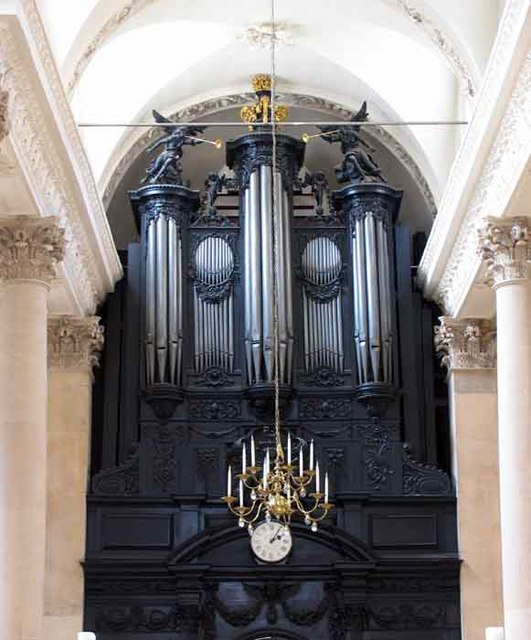
St Stephen Walbrook, 1760

England built the organs of:

- Christ's Chapel of God's Gift, Dulwich, London, 1759
- St Stephen Walbrook, City of London, 1760
- St Matthew Friday Street, City of London, 1762
- St George's Church, Gravesend, Kent, 1764
- St Michael and All Angels' Church, Ashton-under-Lyne, Lancashire, 1770
- St Michael Queenhithe, City of London, 1779 (in conjunction with Hugh Russell)
- St Mary Aldermary, City of London, 1781 (in conjunction with Hugh Russell)
- St Mildred, Poultry, City of London (demolished)
- German Lutheran Church, Goodman's Fields, Tower Hamlets, London
- St Alfege Church, Greenwich, London

‘These organs were remarkable for the brightness and brilliancy of their chorus’ (Hopkins). That of St. Stephen's, Walbrook, a fine specimen of England's work, was repaired by Gray in 1825, rebuilt 1872, and considerably enlarged later by William Hill & Sons.
