= St John's Church, Kingston upon Thames =

St John
- St John the Evangelist
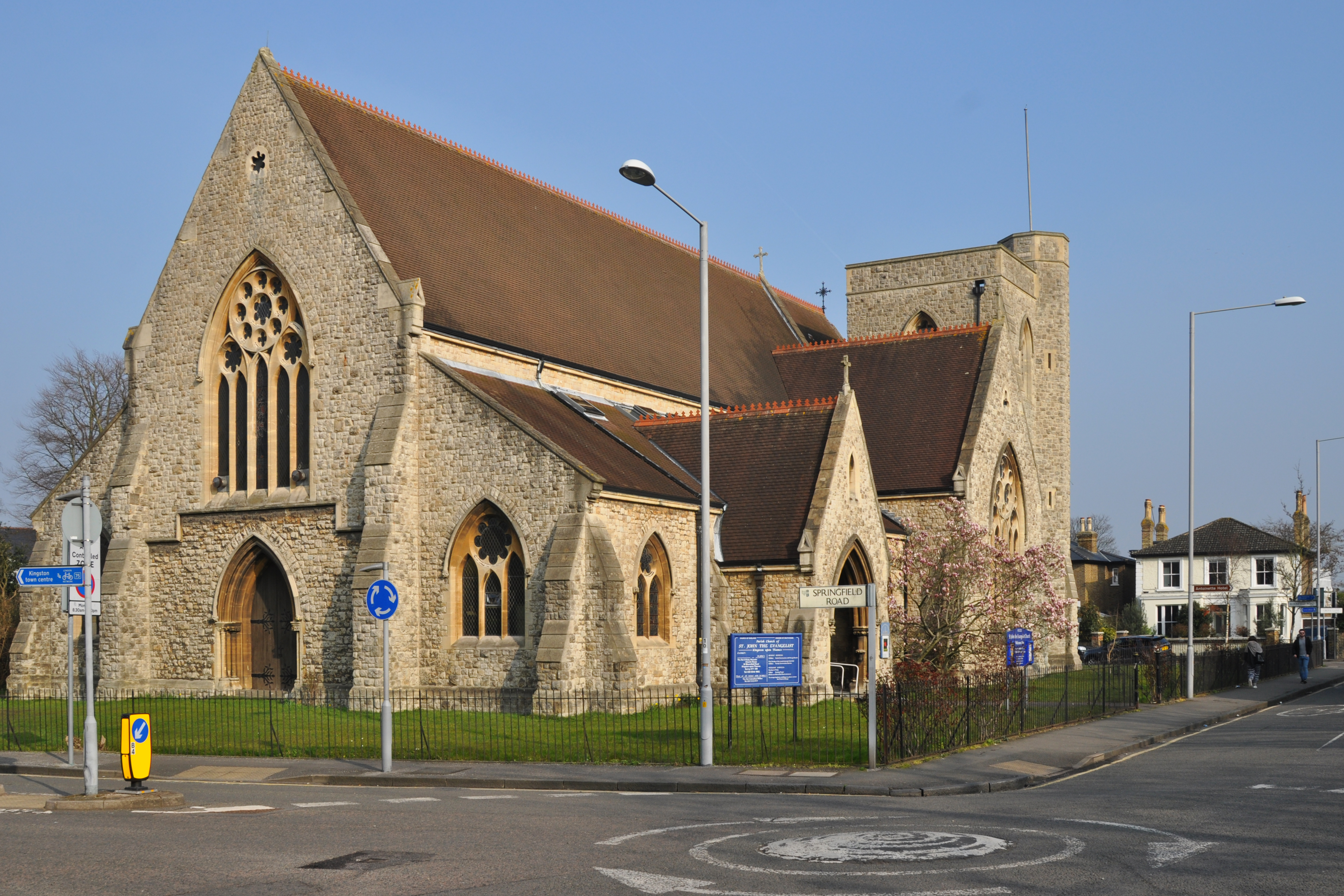
- St John's Church
- St John
- 51.4031°N 0.3008°W
- Location: Grove Lane Kingston, KT1 2SU
- Country: England
- Denomination: Anglican
- Website: St. John's Church

History
- Consecrated: November 1872

Architecture
- Years built: 1871

Administration
- Diocese: Southwark
- Archdeaconry: Wandsworth
- Deanery: Kingston

Clergy
- Vicar: Rev’d Mark Stafford

Listed Building – Grade II
- Designated: 6 March 1975
- Reference no.: 1299894

The Church of St John the Evangelist, or more commonly, St John's Church, is an Anglican church in Kingston upon Thames in the Diocese of Southwark. It is located to the south of the town centre.

The church dates from June 1870, when a temporary iron building was constructed on the corner of Springfield Road and Denmark Road. Bishop Samuel Wilberforce laid the foundation stone for a permanent church in July 1871, on a site donated by William Mercer in the centre of the new Spring Grove Estate. Mercer also gave £2000 towards the cost of building the church, but it was with difficulty that £7000 was raised to build the essentials. The church was consecrated in November 1872 without the tower or spire that were in the original design by the Surbiton architect A. J. Phelps and with little internal ornament. Carvings, paintings, coloured windows and an organ were introduced over time, but the tower, a squat structure with octagonal turret in matching style, was not added until 1935.

The church has been Grade II listed since March 1975.

In 1974, the pews were removed and new heating and lighting installed, to allow Kingston Polytechnic to use the church on weekdays as an examination hall. Later, the choir stalls and the pulpit were removed.
