= Anglican Diocese of Southwark =

Diocese of the Church of England

Coordinates: 51°30′22″N 0°5′23″W

Diocese of Southwark Dioecesis Southwarcensis
- Coat of arms

- Flag

Location
- Ecclesiastical province: Canterbury
- Archdeaconries: Croydon, Lambeth, Lewisham & Greenwich, Reigate, Southwark, Wandsworth

Statistics
- Parishes: 293
- Churches: 369

Information
- Cathedral: Southwark Cathedral
- Language: English

Current leadership
- Bishop: Vacant, Bishop of Southwark
- Suffragans: Rosemarie Mallett, area Bishop of Croydon; Martin Gainsborough, area Bishop of Kingston; Alastair Cutting, area Bishop of Woolwich
- Archdeacons: Simon Gates, Archdeacon of Lambeth; Jonathan Sedgwick, Archdeacon of Southwark; Greg Prior, Archdeacon of Croydon; Chigor Chike, Archdeacon of Lewisham & Greenwich; Bridget Shepherd, Archdeacon of Wandsworth; Geoff Dumbreck, Archdeacon-designate of Reigate

Website
- southwark.anglican.org

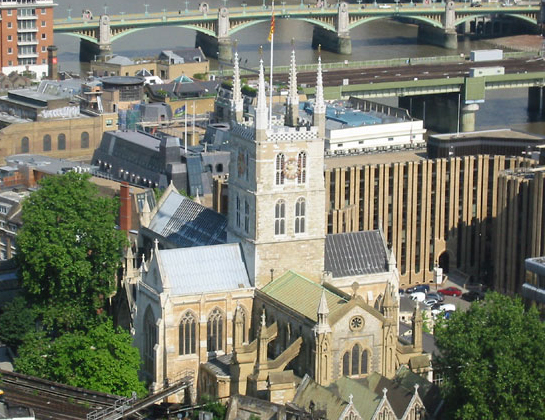
Southwark Cathedral

The Diocese of Southwark (/ˈsʌðərk/ SUDH-ərk) is one of the 42 dioceses of the Church of England, part of the worldwide Anglican Communion. The diocese forms part of the Province of Canterbury in England. It was created on 1 May 1905 from part of the ancient Diocese of Rochester that was served by a suffragan bishop of Southwark from 1891 to 1905. Before 1877, most of the area was part of the ancient Diocese of Winchester, with a small part near the southern end of the London Bridge being part of the ancient Diocese of London.

The cathedral parish is the 13th century, gothic Cathedral and Collegiate Church of St Saviour and St Mary Overie.

== Geographical extent ==
The diocese covers Greater London south of the River Thames (except for the London Borough of Bexley and the London Borough of Bromley) and east Surrey. Since the creation of the diocese's episcopal area scheme in 1991 (which before then had been operating informally for the previous five years), the diocese is divided into three episcopal areas, each of which is overseen by an area bishop and contains two archdeaconries:

- Croydon Episcopal Area (overseen by the area Bishop of Croydon)
  - Archdeaconry of Croydon
    - includes deaneries of Croydon Addington, Croydon Central, Croydon North, Croydon South, and Sutton
  - Archdeaconry of Reigate
    - includes deaneries of Caterham, Godstone, and Reigate
- Kingston Episcopal Area (overseen by the area Bishop of Kingston)
  - Archdeaconry of Lambeth
    - includes deaneries of Brixton, Clapham, Lambeth North, Lambeth South, Streatham, and Merton
  - Archdeaconry of Wandsworth
    - includes deaneries of Battersea, Kingston, Richmond and Barnes, Tooting, and Wandsworth
- Woolwich Episcopal Area (overseen by the area Bishop of Woolwich)
  - Archdeaconry of Lewisham & Greenwich
    - includes deaneries of Charlton, Deptford, East Lewisham, Eltham and Mottingham, Plumstead, and West Lewisham
  - Archdeaconry of Southwark
    - includes deaneries of Bermondsey, Camberwell, Dulwich, and Southwark and Newington

In other ecclesiastical use, although having lost religious orders in the English Reformation, the diocese has the London home of the Archbishop of Canterbury and records centre of the Church of England in the diocese, Lambeth Palace.

== Bishops ==
Alongside the diocesan Bishop of Southwark (currently vacant), the diocese has three area (suffragan) bishops: Rosemarie Mallett, area Bishop of Croydon; Martin Gainsborough, area Bishop of Kingston; and Alastair Cutting, area Bishop of Woolwich. Since 1994 the Bishop of Fulham (currently Jonathan Baker, since 2013) has provided 'alternative episcopal oversight' in the diocese (along with those of London and Rochester) to those parishes which reject the ordination of women to the priesthood. Baker is licensed as an honorary assistant bishop in Southwark diocese in order to facilitate his ministry there.

Several other bishops are licensed as honorary assistant bishops in the diocese:

- 2004–present: Michael Doe, Preacher to Gray's Inn, former General Secretary of USPG and former Bishop suffragan of Swindon, lives in Woolwich.
- 2006–present: Richard Harries, Baron Harries of Pentregarth, is an honorary professor of theology at King's College London, former Gresham Professor of Divinity and former Bishop of Oxford.
- 2009–present: David Atkinson, former Bishop suffragan of Thetford, lives in South Croydon.
- 2011–present: Alan Chesters, retired diocesan Bishop of Blackburn, lives in Lingfield, Surrey (he is also licensed in Sussex and in Europe).
- 2011–present: Peter Selby, a visiting professor at King's College London and retired Bishop of Worcester, Bishop to Prisons and suffragan (later area) Bishop of Kingston, lives in Sydenham.
- 2013–present: The Archbishop of Canterbury's chief of staff, Nigel Stock, Bishop at Lambeth, Bishop to the Forces and Bishop for the Falkland Islands, lives in Lambeth.
- 2014–present: Stephen Platten, Rector of St Michael Cornhill (Diocese of London) and retired Bishop of Wakefield (also in London and Newcastle dioceses).
- 2021–present: Rob Gillion, Vicar of Streatham Christ Church and Associate Bishop for the Arts (honorary assistant bishop), is a former Bishop of Riverina

== Churches ==
=== Outside deanery structures ===
Cathedral of St Saviour & St Mary Overie, Southwark

=== Archdeaconry of Croydon ===
==== Deanery of Croydon Addington ====
===== Current =====
Church	Established
Addington (St Mary the Blessed Virgin)	Medieval
West Wickham St John the Baptist	Medieval, rebuilt late C15th
Shirley St John the Evangelist	1856
West Wickham St Mary of Nazareth	1934, rebuilt 1954
West Wickham St Francis of Assisi	1936
Selsdon St John the Divine	1936
Shirley St George the Martyr	1952
Spring Park (All Saints)	1956
New Addington (St Edward King & Confessor)	1957
Selsdon St Francis	1962

===== Former =====
Church	Established
New Addington St George	1946, perm. building 1962, decl. redundant 1985

==== Deanery of Croydon Central ====
===== Current =====
Church	Established
Croydon St John the Baptist Minster	Medieval, rebuilt 1870
Croydon Christ Church Broad Green	1851, rebuilt 1991
(South) Croydon St Peter	1851
Croydon St Andrew	1857
Croydon St Matthew	1865, rebuilt on different site 1972
Addiscombe St Mary Magdalene (with St Martin)	1878 (begun 1869, joined CoE 1878)
Croydon St Michael & All Angels (with St James)	1883
(South) Croydon St Augustine	1884
South Croydon Emmanuel	1899
Waddon (St George)	1932
Addiscombe St Mildred	1913, permanent building 1931-32

===== Former =====
Church	Established
Croydon Common, St James	1829, declared redundant 1989
Croydon St Edmund	c. 1881, declared redundant c. 1964
Croydon Addiscombe St Martin	1902, declared redundant 1994, demolished 1995

==== Deanery of Croydon North ====
===== CurrentCurrent =====
Church	Established
Upper Norwood All Saints with St Margaret	1829
South Norwood St Mark	1852
Croydon Holy Saviour	1867
Thornton Heath St Paul	1871
Upper Norwood St John the Evangelist	1875, present building 1887
Thornton Heath St Jude with St Aidan	1884, present building 1929
(Croydon) Woodside St Luke	1887, largely rebuilt 1927
Norbury St Stephen	1889, present building 1912
South Norwood Holy Innocents	1895
South Norwood St Alban the Martyr	1899-1925
Norbury St Philip	1900-1935
Norbury St Oswald	1936

===== Former =====
Church	Established
Croydon Holy Trinity	1881, declared redundant 1980
Upper Norwood St Margaret	1901, declared redundant 2003
Thornton Heath, St Aidan (unconsecrated)	1964, use ceased 1978

==== Deanery of Croydon South ====
Church	Established
Sanderstead All Saints	Medieval
Coulsdon St John the Evangelist	Medieval
Kenley (All Saints)	1872
Purley Christ Church	1878
Riddlesdown (St James)	1903, current building 1915-1931
Sanderstead St Mary	1908, current building 1926
Purley St Mark	1910
Purley St Barnabas	1910, rebuilt 1913, 1932, 1958, closed 2025
Coulsdon St Andrew	1914
Purley St Swithun	1929, current building 1939–1954
Riddlesdown St Edmund King & Martyr	pre-1950, current building 1957
Hamsey Green St Antony	1955

=== Archdeaconry of Lambeth ===
==== Deanery of Lambeth North ====
===== Current =====
Church	Established
Clapham St Paul	Medieval (as St Mary's, then Holy Trinity), rebuilt 1815
Clapham Holy Trinity	1776
South Lambeth St Anne & All Saints	1793, rebuilt 1876 and 1958
Brixton St Matthew with St Jude	1822
Kennington St Mark	1824
Waterloo St John the Evangelist	1824
North Brixton (Christ Church)	1835, rebuilt 1902
Stockwell (St Michael)	1841
Clapham St John the Evangelist	1842
Angell Town (St John the Evangelist)	1853
Waterloo St Andrew	1855, new building 1960, new building 2006
South Lambeth St Stephen	1861, rebuilt 1969
Clapham Christ Church	1862
Vauxhall (St Peter)	1864
Kennington St John the Divine	1874
Clapham St Peter	1879
Brixton St Paul with St Saviour	1881, original building redundant 1980 and congregation moved to present church (built 1958)
Kennington Cross (St Anselm)	1887, new building 1914–1933
Clapham Holy Spirit	1913

===== Former =====
Church	Established
Lambeth St Mary	Medieval, rebuilt 1852, declared redundant 1972; now a museum of gardens
Lambeth St Mary the Less	1828, closed 1966
Lambeth Holy Trinity	1839, closed 1951
Kennington Park, St James	1840s, closed 1923
Lambeth All Saints	1846, demolished 1901
Kennington St Barnabas	1850, declared redundant 1980
Lambeth St Thomas	1857, demolished 1956
Lambeth St Silas	1862, demolished c. 1945
Lambeth St Philip	1863, declared redundant 1975
Clapham St Saviour	1864, destroyed 1940
Brixton St Jude	1868, declared redundant 1979
Lambeth Emmanuel	1869, closed 1951
Brixton St Saviour	1875, original building redundant 1977, LEP with Methodists 1979, closed 2005
Brixton St Catherine	1877, closed 1902
South Lambeth All Saints	1878, declared redundant c. 1949
Lambeth St Augustine	1882, rebuilt 1899, closed 1949
Stockwell Epiphany	c. 1910, out of use 1930s
Clapham St Bede	1924, redundant before 1983
Stockwell Green St Andrew	1767, closed 2014

==== Deanery of Lambeth South ====
===== Current =====
Church	Established
Streatham St Leonard	Medieval, largely rebuilt 1831 and 1976
West Norwood (St Luke)	1825
Clapham St James	1829, rebuilt 1958
Streatham Christ Church	1841
Streatham Immanuel	1854, rebuilt 1865, 1989
Tulse Hill (Holy Trinity)	1856
Clapham Park (All Saints)	1858, rebuilt 1982
Streatham St Peter	1865, present building 1870
Gipsy Hill (Christ Church)	1867, rebuilt 1987
West Dulwich All Saints	1875, present building 1888–1897
West Dulwich Emmanuel	1877, rebuilt 1968
Streatham Hill (St Margaret the Queen)	1889-1907
Telford Park St Thomas	1901
Streatham Vale (Holy Redeemer)	1932
Dulwich Grace Church	c. 2015 (date of joining CoE; established 2005)

===== Former =====
Church	Established
Gipsy Hill St Jude	1880, closed 1960s
Streatham St Anselm	1882, closed 1952
Lower Streatham St Andrew	1886, declared redundant 1988
Streatham All Saints	1897, closed 1953
Streatham St John	1908, closed c. 1940
West Norwood St Paul	1909, closed c. 1962
Clapham Park St Stephen	1974, closed 2023

==== Deanery of Merton ====
===== Current =====
Church	Established
Merton St Mary the Virgin	Medieval
Mitcham SS Peter & Paul	Medieval, rebuilt 1821
Morden St Lawrence	Medieval, rebuilt 1636
Wimbledon St Mary	Medieval, mostly rebuilt 1843
West Wimbledon (Christ Church)	1859
South Wimbledon Holy Trinity	1863
Colliers Wood (Christ Church)	1874
Wimbledon St John the Baptist	1875
South Wimbledon St Andrew	1883, current building 1909
South Wimbledon All Saints	1887, current building 1893
Wimbledon Emmanuel [proprietary chapel]	1888
Wimbledon St Matthew	1895, rebuilt 1909, 1958
Mitcham St Mark	1899-1910
Wimbledon St Mark	1902, rebuilt 1969
Raynes Park (St Saviour)	1905
Wimbledon Park St Luke	1908
Motspur Park (Holy Cross)	1908, rebuilt 1948
Mitcham St Barnabas	1914
Merton St John the Divine	1914
Mitcham St Olave	1931
Morden St George	1932
Mitcham Ascension	1953
Morden St Martin	1956
Merton St James	1957
Morden Emmanuel	1962

===== Former =====
Church	Established
South Wimbledon St Peter	1901, rebuilt 1911, redundant 1982

=== Archdeaconry of Lewisham and Greenwich ===
Deanery of Charlton: Blackheath St John the Evangelist, Blackheath Park (St Michael & All Angels), Charlton St Luke, Charlton St Thomas, East Greenwich (Christ Church), Greenwich (St Alfege), Greenwich Peninsula (Holy Trinity), Kidbrooke St James, Kidbrooke St Nicholas, Westcombe Park (St George), Woolwich (St Mary Magdalene)

Deanery of Deptford: Blackheath Ascension, Brockley (St Peter), Deptford Holy Trinity, Deptford St John, Deptford St Luke, Deptford St Nicholas, Deptford St Paul, Hatcham St Catherine, Hatcham St James, Hatcham St Michael, Hatcham Park (All Saints)

Deanery of Eltham & Mottingham: Eltham Holy Trinity, Eltham St Barnabas, Eltham St John the Baptist, Eltham St Saviour, Eltham Park (St Luke), Mottingham St Alban, Mottingham St Andrew, Mottingham St Edward the Confessor, New Eltham (All Saints)

Deanery of Lewisham East: Bellingham (St Dunstan), Blackheath All Saints, Catford St Andrew the Apostle, Catford St John, Catford St Laurence, Downham St Barnabas, Downham St Luke, Grove Park (St Augustine), Hither Green (St Swithun), Lee Good Shepherd, Lee St Margaret, Lee St Mildred, Lee St Peter, Lewisham St Mary the Virgin, Lewisham St Stephen, North Downham (St Mark)

Deanery of Lewisham West: Brockley Hill (St Saviour), Crofton Park (St Hilda), Honor Oak Park (St Augustine of Canterbury), Lower Sydenham (St Michael & All Angels), Perry Hill (St George), Sydenham All Saints, Sydenham Holy Trinity, Sydenham St Bartholomew, Sydenham St Philip the Apostle

Deanery of Plumstead: Abbey Wood St Michael & All Angels, Abbey Wood William Temple, East Wickham St Michael the Archangel, Plumstead Ascension, Plumstead St John the Baptist, Plumstead St Mark, Plumstead St Nicholas, Shooters Hill All Saints, Shooters Hill Christ Church, Thamesmead Church of the Cross, Thamesmead St Paul, Welling St Mary the Virgin

=== Archdeaconry of Reigate ===
Deanery of Reigate: Betchworth (St Michael & All Angels), Brockham Green (Christ Church), Buckland (St Mary the Virgin), Charlwood (St Nicholas), Chipstead (St Margaret of Antioch), Gatton (St Andrew), Horley St Bartholomew, Horley St Francis, Horley St Wilfrid, Kingswood (St Andrew), Leigh (St Bartholomew), Lower Kingswood (Wisdom of God), Merstham (St Katharine), Redhill Holy Trinity, Redhill St John the Evangelist, Redhill St Matthew, Reigate St Luke, Reigate St Mark, St Mary's Church, Reigate, Reigate St Philip, Reigate Heath Church, Reigate Mill Church, Salfords (Christ the King), Sidlow Bridge (Emmanuel), South Merstham (All Saints), Tadworth (Good Shepherd), Woodmansterne (St Peter)

Deanery of Sutton: Beddington (St Mary), Belmont (St John the Baptist), Benhilton (All Saints), Carshalton (All Saints), Carshalton Beeches (Good Shepherd), Cheam St Alban the Martyr, Cheam St Dunstan, Cheam St Oswald, Hackbridge and Beddington Corner All Saints, Roundshaw (St Paul), St Helier Bishop Andrewes, St Helier St Peter, South Beddington (St Michael & All Angels), Sutton Christ Church, Sutton St Barnabas, Sutton St Nicholas, Wallington Holy Trinity, Wallington Springfield Church, Wallington St Patrick, Worcester Park (Christ Church)

Deanery of Tandridge

Church	Established
Bletchingley (St Mary the Virgin)	Medieval
Burstow (St Bartholomew)	Medieval
Caterham St Laurence	Medieval
Chaldon (SS Peter & Paul)	Medieval
Chelsham (St Leonard)	Medieval, largely rebuilt 1871
Crowhurst (St George)	Medieval
Farleigh (St Mary)	Medieval
Godstone St Nicholas	Medieval
Horne (St Mary)	Medieval
Limpsfield (St Peter)	Medieval
Lingfield (SS Peter & Paul)	Medieval
Nutfield (SS Peter & Paul)	Medieval
Oxted (St Mary)	Medieval
Tandridge (St Peter)	Medieval
Tatsfield (St Mary)	Medieval
Warlingham All Saints	Medieval
Woldingham St Agatha	Medieval, rebuilt 1832
Blindley Heath (St John the Evangelist)	1842
Whyteleafe (St Luke)	1864
Felbridge (St John)	1865
Caterham St Mary the Virgin	1868
Godstone St Stephen	1869
Outwood (St John the Baptist)	1869
Caterham St John the Evangelist	1882
Dormansland (St John the Evangelist)	1882
South Nutfield (Christ Church)	1888
Limpsfield Chart (St Andrew)	1895
Warlingham St Christopher	1907
Hurst Green (St John the Evangelist)	1913
Woldingham St Paul	1933

=== Archdeaconry of Southwark ===
==== Deanery of Bermondsey ====
===== Current =====
Church	Established
Bermondsey St Mary Magdalen	Medieval, rebuilt 1680–1690
Rotherhithe St Mary	Medieval, rebuilt 1714
Bermondsey St James	1829
Rotherhithe Holy Trinity	1837, rebuilt 1957
Camberwell St Philip the Apostle	1866, rebuilt 1875, 1963
Bermondsey St Anne	1872
Bermondsey St Katharine	1884, rebuilt 1960

===== Former =====
Church	Established
Bermondsey St John	1726-1733, declared redundant 1968, site sold 1974
Rotherhithe Christ Church	1839, declared redundant 1958, demolished 1979
Rotherhithe All Saints	1840, declared redundant 1952
Bermondsey Christ Church	1848, declared redundant 1956
Rotherhithe St Paul	1850, closed c. 1955
Rotherhithe St Barnabas	1872, declared redundant c. 1956
South Bermondsey St Augustine	1873, rebuilt 1883, declared redundant 1995
Bermondsey St Crispin	1879, rebuilt 1959, declared redundant 1999
Camberwell St Mark	1880, declared redundant 1965
Bermondsey St Andrew	1882, closed c. 1945
Bermondsey St Luke	1885, declared redundant 1961
Camberwell St Bartholomew	1887, declared redundant 1993

Deanery of Camberwell: Camberwell St George, Camberwell St Giles, Camberwell St Luke, Camberwell St Matthew, Nunhead (St Antony), Peckham All Saints, Peckham Christ Church, Peckham St John, Peckham St Mary Magdalene

Deanery of Dulwich: Dulwich Christ's Chapel of God's Gift, Dulwich St Barnabas, Dulwich St Clement, East Dulwich St John the Evangelist, Herne Hill St Paul, Herne Hill St Saviour, North Dulwich St Faith, Peckham St Saviour, South Dulwich St Stephen

Deanery of Southwark and Newington: Bermondsey St Hugh, Camberwell St Michael & All Angels, Kennington Park (St Agnes), Newington St Mary, Newington St Paul, Southwark Christ Church, Southwark St George the Martyr, Southwark St Matthew, Walworth St Christopher, Walworth St John, Walworth St Peter

=== Archdeaconry of Wandsworth ===
Deanery of Battersea: Battersea Christ Church, Battersea St George, Battersea St Luke, Battersea St Mary, Battersea St Peter, Battersea Park All Saints, Battersea Park St Saviour, Battersea Rise St Mark, Clapham Common (St Barnabas), Lavender Hill (Ascension), Wandsworth Common (St Michael)

Deanery of Kingston: Ham St Andrew, Hook (St Paul), Kingston upon Thames All Saints, Kingston upon Thames St John the Evangelist, Kingston upon Thames St Luke, Kingston upon Thames St Paul, Kingston Vale (St John the Baptist), Malden St James, Malden St John the Baptist, New Malden Christ Church, New Malden St John the Divine, Norbiton (St Peter), Surbiton St Andrew, Surbiton St Mark, Surbiton St Matthew, Surbiton Hill (Christ Church), Tolworth Emmanuel, Tolworth St George

Deanery of Richmond and Barnes: Barnes Holy Trinity, Barnes St Mary, Barnes St Michael & All Angels, East Sheen All Saints, East Sheen Christ Church, Ham St Richard, Kew St Anne, Kew St Luke, Kew St Philip & All Saints, Mortlake (St Mary the Virgin), Petersham (St Peter), Richmond Holy Trinity, Richmond St John the Divine, Richmond St Mary Magdalene, Richmond St Matthias

Deanery of Tooting: Balham (St Mary), Balham Hill (Ascension), Furzedown (St Paul), Streatham Park (St Alban), Summerstown (St Mary), Tooting All Saints, Tooting St Augustine, Tooting St Nicholas, Upper Tooting (Holy Trinity), Wandsworth Common (St Mary Magdalene), West Streatham (St James)

Deanery of Wandsworth: Ackroydon Community Church, Earlsfield St Andrew, Earlsfield St John the Divine, East Putney (St Stephen), Putney All Saints, Putney St Margaret, Putney St Mary, Roehampton (Holy Trinity), Southfields (St Barnabas), Wandsworth All Saints, Wandsworth Holy Trinity, Wandsworth St Anne, Wandsworth St Michael & All Angels, Wimbledon Park St Paul

== See also ==
- Roman Catholic Archdiocese of Southwark
