= St Michael Queenhithe =

Former church in London

Coordinates: 51°30′40″N 0°5′42″W

St. Michael Queenhithe
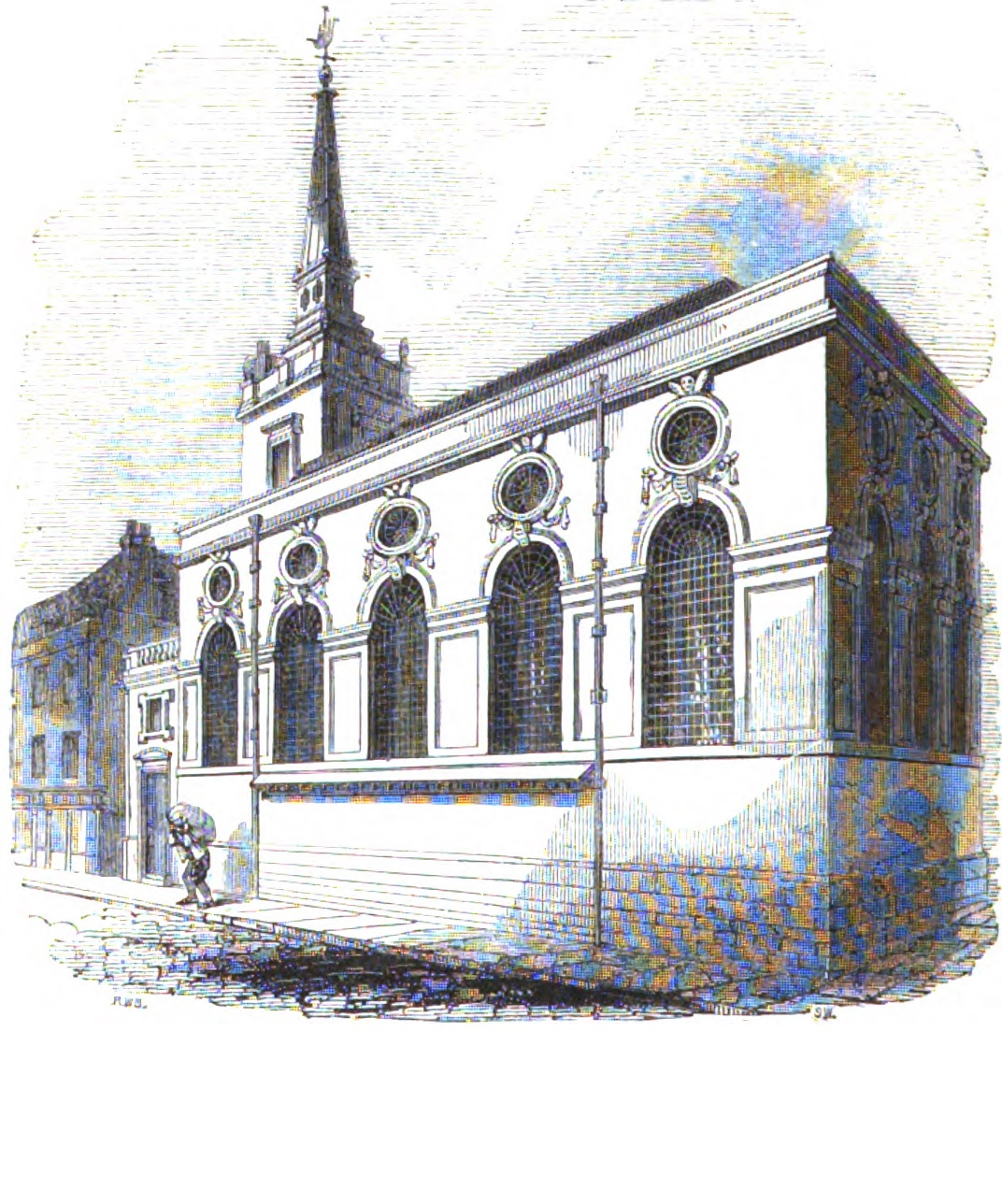
- St. Michael Queenhithe
- Location: Upper Thames Street, Queenhithe, City of London
- Country: England
- Denomination: Church of England

Architecture
- Architect: Christopher Wren
- Style: Baroque
- Demolished: 1876

St. Michael Queenhithe was a church in the City of London located in what is now Upper Thames Street. First recorded in the 12th century, the church was destroyed during the Great Fire of London in 1666. Rebuilt by the office of Sir Christopher Wren, it was demolished in 1876.

== History ==
London had seven churches named after the Archangel Michael in the Middle Ages, of which five were rebuilt after the Great Fire. Queenhithe is still the name of the ward which the church was located in, and a dock on the Thames near to the church.

The earliest reference to the church is as St Michael Aedredeshuda in the 12th century (Aethelredhyth being an earlier name for Queenhithe). The church was also recorded as St Michael upon Thames, St Michael in Huda, St Michael de Hutha Regina and St Michael super Ripam Regine.

John Stow described it as “A convenient church but al the monuments therein are defaced.”

During the Great Fire, Charles II and the future James II “came down from Whitehall by boat to Queenhithe and, from a high rooftop, saw dwellings, Company halls and churches blazing.” The flames soon engulfed St. Michael Queenhithe.

The church was rebuilt, incorporating some of the old walls, between 1676 and 1686 at a cost of £4375. The parish was combined with that of Holy Trinity the Less, also destroyed in the Fire, but not rebuilt.

Uniquely for a Wren church, a famous painter contributed to its decoration. According to Malcolm in London Redivivum, the church officers thanked Sir James Thornhill – father-in-law of Hogarth and painter of the grisailles on the ceiling of St Paul's Cathedral for his “liberality in repairing and improving the painting which adorned the altar” in 1721. This was later destroyed.

In 1779 a new organ was provided by George England and Hugh Russell.

Due to the move of population from the city to the suburbs in the second half of the nineteenth century, the church became redundant and the last service held in December 1875. The church was demolished in 1876 under the Union of Benefices Act 1860. The parish was combined with that of St James Garlickhythe, which also received much of the church fittings. The proceeds of the sale of St. Michael Queenhithe were used to build St Michael's Church, Camden Town.

The site of St. Michael Queenhithe now partly lies under the northern carriageway of Upper Thames Street, where it is crossed by a footbridge, whilst the churchyard to its north now lies under the western part of Fur Trade House, completed in 1972. There is a plan to redevelop the area as a hotel.

== Architecture ==
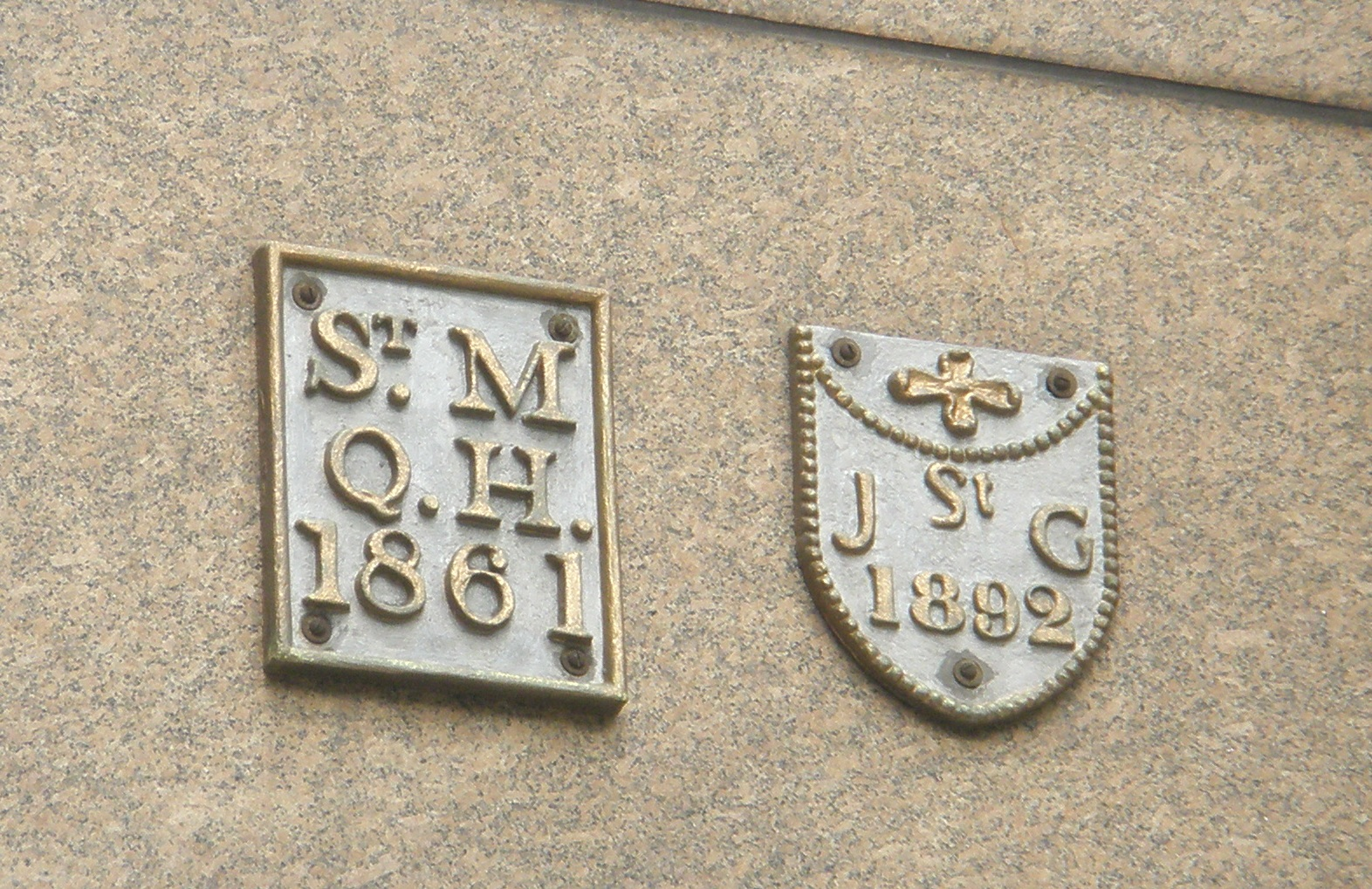
A parish boundary mark can be found in Little Trinity Lane.

St. Michael Queenhithe had its main front on the south and east facing the Queenhithe dock. It was five bays long from east to west and three bays long from north to south. The lower level of windows were round-headed and separated from the upper tier of circular windows by swags.

The entrance lobby and the vestry were built at a lower level than the body of the church.

The tower, on the northwest corner, was surmounted by a steeple reminiscent of a ziggurat, with five steps ascending on four sides to a pointed leaded spire rearing from the dais. At the top of the spire was a vane in the shape of a three-masted barque, of the type used to carry corn – a reference to the chief cargo unloaded at the nearby dock. Just underneath the ship was a brass sphere that could hold a bushel of grain.

After the church was demolished, the vane remained in situ perched on a miniature spire. It was moved to the top of the newly restored spire of St Nicholas Cole Abbey in 1962, where it remains today.

== See also ==
- List of Christopher Wren churches in London
- List of churches rebuilt after the Great Fire but since demolished
- St Mary Somerset
