= St Andrew's, Croydon =

St Andrew's
- Church of St Andrew
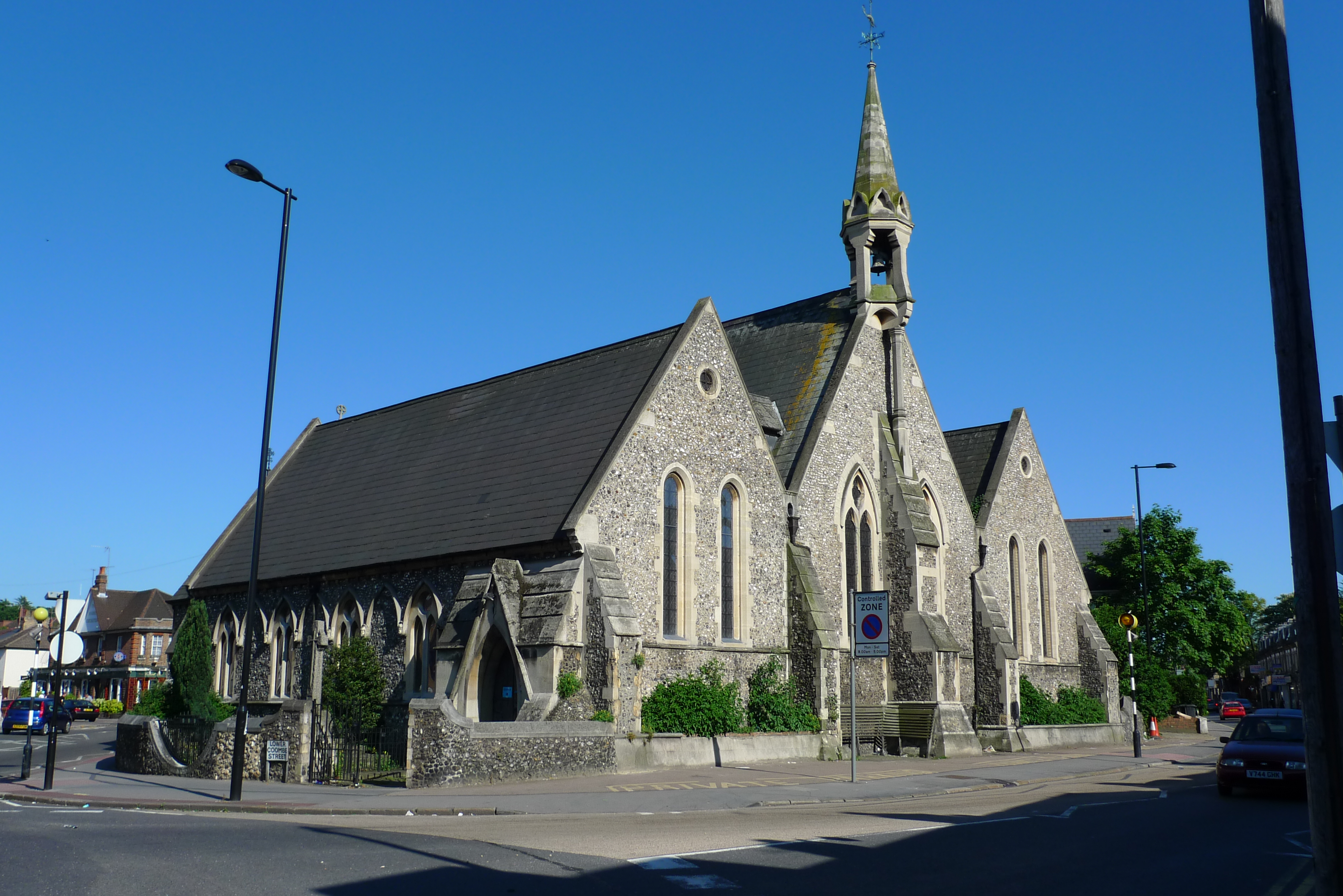
- The church in 2010, when it still had its bell turret
- St Andrew's
- 51°22′05″N 00°06′09″W
- Location: Southbridge Road, Croydon, London
- Country: England
- Denomination: Church of England
- Churchmanship: Anglo-Catholic

History
- Dedication: St Andrew

Architecture
- Heritage designation: Grade II listed
- Years built: 1857

Administration
- Diocese: Diocese of Southwark
- Archdeaconry: Archdeaconry of Croydon
- Deanery: Croydon Central
- Parish: St. Andrew Croydon

Clergy
- Bishop: The Rt Revd Jonathan Clark (Bishop of Croydon)
- Vicar: Fr Wealands Bell

St Andrew's, formally the Church of St Andrew, is a church of England church in Croydon, London, England.

== History ==
It was built in 1857. Aisles were added in 1870. A lady chapel designed by H B Walters was added in 1891. An organ chamber lies opposite the lady chapel. The nave has five bays and the triple chancel arch has a wrought-iron screen.

The building, in flint with stone dressing, was given Grade II listed status in November 1976, protecting it from unauthorised alteration or demolition, but is on Historic England's Heritage at Risk Register, due to its "slow decay" with "no solution agreed". The former bell-turret has been dismantled due to its poor condition, but the building's listed status legally requires its reinstatement.

=== Present day ===
The church falls within Croydon Central Deanery in the Diocese of Southwark.

St Andrew's is a parish in the Anglo-Catholic tradition. It had previously passed resolutions that rejected the ministry of female priests, but these were rescinded in 2013.

== Organ ==
The church contained an organ dating from 1891, by William Hill & Sons, which was removed, and replaced by another from the same maker in 1906. Specifications for the latter can be found on the National Pipe Organ Register.

The church's current electronic organ was purchased from the Sultan of Oman in around 2012.
