= St Leonard's Church, Streatham =

Coordinates: 51.4295°N 0.1317°W

St Leonard’s Church, Streatham
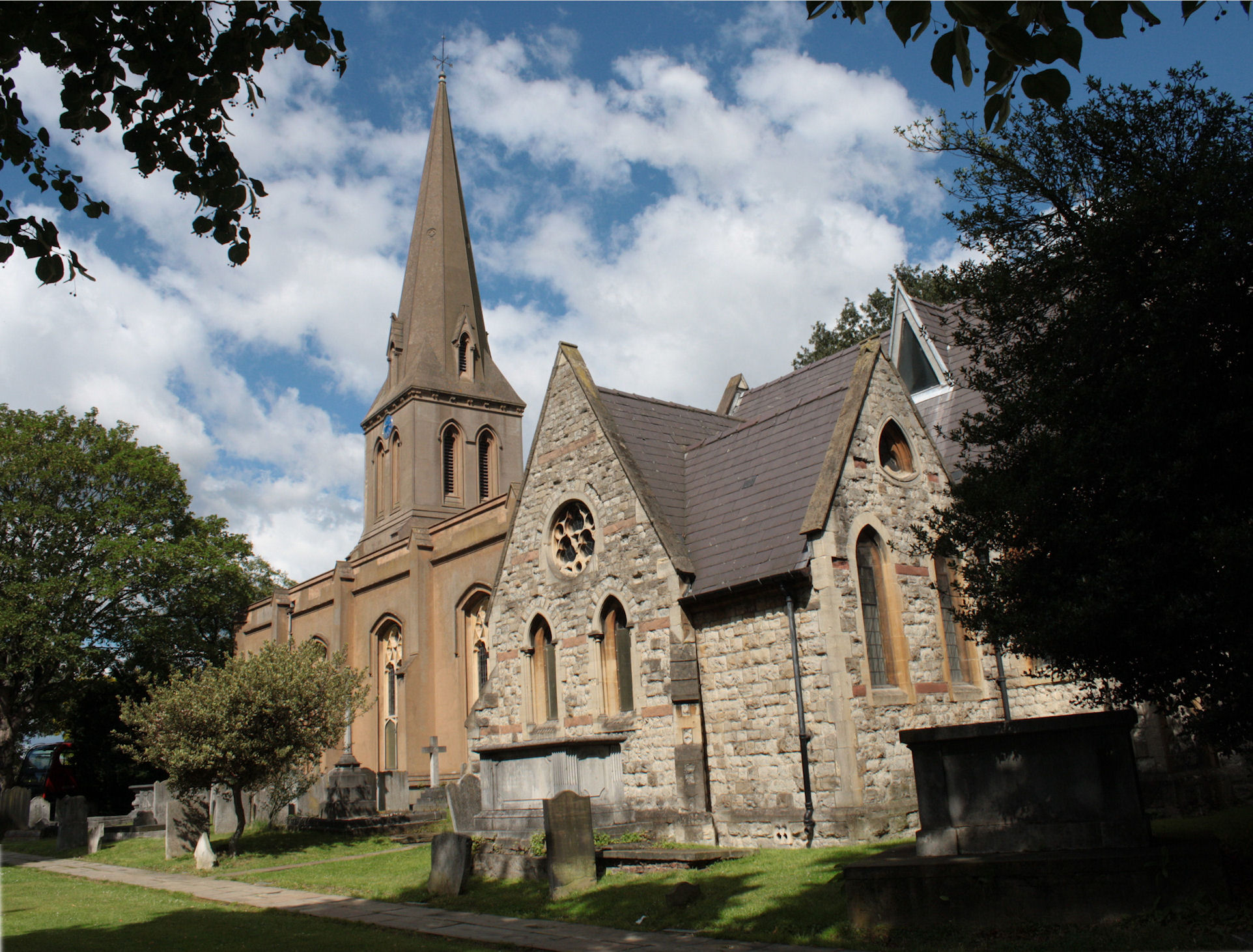
- St Leonard’s Church, Streatham
- OS grid reference: TQ 29986 71715
- Location: Tooting Bec Gardens, Streatham, London SW16 1HS
- Country: England
- Denomination: Church of England
- Churchmanship: Modern Catholic
- Website: Church website

Administration
- Province: Province of Canterbury
- Diocese: Diocese of Southwark
- Archdeaconry: Archdeaconry of Lambeth
- Deanery: Lambeth South Deanery
- Parish: St Leonard, Streatham

Clergy
- Rector: Rev Canon Anna Norman-Walker

St Leonard's Church is a Church of England parish church in the London Borough of Lambeth. It is a Grade II listed building and occupies a prominent position on the west side of Streatham High Road, at its junction with Tooting Bec Gardens and Mitcham Lane.

== Parish ==
Streatham is an ancient parish which is mentioned in the Domesday Book and originally included land in the districts that are now generally known as Balham and Tooting Bec.

In response to the great increase in the local population during the 19th and 20th centuries, parts of the area of the original parish of St Leonard's were assigned to form the whole or parts of these more newly created parishes:

- All Saints, West Dulwich
- Ascension, Balham Hill
- Christ Church, Streatham
- Holy Trinity, Tulse Hill
- Holy Trinity, Upper Tooting
- Immanuel, Streatham
- St Margaret the Queen, Streatham Hill
- St Peter, Streatham
- St Alban, Streatham Park
- St Andrew, Lower Streatham
- St Anselm, Coventry Park
- St James, West Streatham
- St John the Divine, Balham Hill
- St Mary, Balham
- St Mary, Summerstown
- St Thomas, Telford Park
- The Holy Redeemer, Streatham Vale

The Diocese of Southwark estimates the population of St Leonard's parish was 11,293 in 2001.

== Building ==
The lower part of the tower is the oldest section of the current building, having been constructed in the 14th century. A number of fittings within the church are also of relatively early date, including a 15th-century font, a mutilated figure of a knight under a 14th-century canopy and a number of other brasses and monuments.

In 1830–1, almost the entire church apart from the tower was rebuilt to plans by Joseph T. Parkinson. The spire, which was struck by lightning in 1841, along with the top of the tower was rebuilt soon afterwards. The present stone chancel was constructed in 1863 to designs by William Dyce and was completed under the direction of Benjamin Ferrey. Further alterations took place in 1877. William Dyce is commemorated by a memorial tablet inside the church.

The church was gutted by fire in on 5 May 1975 and subsequently restored to plans by The Douglas Feast Partnership. This work involved a number of alterations including the installation of a staircase that provides access to the gallery and a mezzanine floor, provision of new seating, an organ, paved stone floor (incorporating older ledger stones), Chapel of Unity at the west end of the south aisle and clerestory lights in the nave and chancel.

A detailed description of the present-day interior of the church is available online.

The churchyard is well-stocked with monuments and contains four Grade II listed tombs which commemorate:

- George Abell, died 1826
- Joseph Hay, died 1805
- Lt. Col. William Boyce, died 1808
- Thomas Helps, died 1842, & his family.

=== Contested heritage ===
A review commissioned by Lambeth Council, following the Black Lives Matter protests during 2020, to identify locations in Lambeth with historic direct and indirect links to the trans-Atlantic slave trade and colonialism, included the memorial to John Massingberd, Treasurer of the East India Company as having a proven association.
