= Christ Church, New Malden =

Coordinates: 51°24′25″N 0°15′27″W

Christ Church
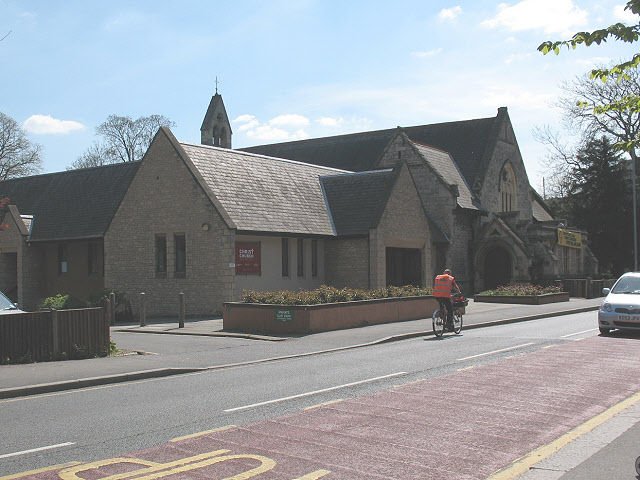
- Christ Church in 2010
- Christ Church
- Location: New Malden, Royal Borough of Kingston upon Thames, Greater London
- Country: England
- Denomination: Church of England
- Churchmanship: Open Evangelical
- Website: ccnm.org

History
- Founded: 3 December 1866
- Founder: Reverend Charles Stirling
- Consecrated: 1866 by Bishop Charles Summer

Architecture
- Architect(s): Brandon and Freshwater
- Years built: April–3 December 1866

Administration
- Diocese: Southwark

Clergy
- Vicar: Stephen Kuhrt

Christ Church is an evangelical Church located in the suburb of New Malden in the Royal Borough of Kingston upon Thames, Greater London. Established on 3 December 1866, Christ Church is part of the Church of England, and is located in the Kingston Episcopal Area of the Diocese of Southwark. As of August 2022, Christ Church claims a weekly attendance of 750. The current vicar is Stephen Kuhrt, serving since 2007.

New Malden was a rapidly growing town, with its first seven residential streets built throughout the late 1850s. On 17 November 1865, Charles Stirling, first vicar of Christ Church, proposed its construction to the New Malden Local Board, with the opening and consecration of Christ Church taking place on 3 December 1866. The Church was enlarged with a new chancel and sacristy on 23 February 1878. On 12 November 1892, Stirling retired as vicar. Another extension to the church was built in 1966, with said hall later being demolished and replaced with a new entrance and new halls between 2017 and October 2018.

== History ==
Reverend Charles Stirling, an evangelical Christian, noticed the need for a church in New Malden, and so on 17 November 1865 Stirling sent out a public notice to the New Malden Local Board requesting the permission to construct a church. He estimated that the cost would be "about £2,000". Prince George, Duke of Cambridge, owner of the land, gave it to Christ Church. The building of the Church commenced in April 1866, with its foundation stone laid on 12 June. The opening and consecration of Christ Church took place on 3 December. It was consecrated by the Diocese of Winchester, Charles Sumner, in a ceremony that was attended by a large congregation. That same day, Stirling was formally appointed as the first vicar of Christ Church.

On 23 February 1878, the Church was reopened and consecrated by the Bishop of Rochester, Anthony Thorold, after the Church was enlarged with a new chancel and sacristy. The chancel was provided by the Sim family as a memorial to their parents John Carsgoyne Sim and wife Margaretta. On 12 November 1892, Stirling resigned as vicar of Christ Church after serving for 25 years. He gave his last sermon that Sunday. That same day, the board of trustees appointed William Allen Challacombe to the vicarage of Christ Church. He arrived in New Malden in January 1893. Christ Church was once again extended in 1894, taking a form still recognisable today as of 2022.

Another extension to the church was built in 1966 on its west side, named the Vestry Hall, followed by the addition of a lounge and kitchen in 1981. New halls and a new entrance were constructed between 2017 and October 2018.

== Vicars ==
Since Christ Church's foundation in 1866, there have been ten vicars. The current vicar is Stephen Kuhrt, serving since 2007.

Name	From	Until
Charles Stirling	3 December 1866	12 November 1892
William Allen Challacombe	12 November 1892	August 1920
Alvan Birkett	1921	20 June 1935
Arthur Willoughby Habershon	1935	1944
Claude Bartle	1944	1958
Llewellyn Edwin Lloyd Roberts	1958	1968
Peter Coombs	1968	1975
John Short	1976	1990
Stewart Downey	1991	2006
Stephen Kuhrt	2007	Incumbent
