= Holy Flying Circus =

2011 BBC television comedy film

- DVD cover art
- Written by: Tony Roche
- Directed by: Owen Harris
- Starring: Darren Boyd; Charles Edwards; Steve Punt; Rufus Jones; Tom Fisher; Phil Nichol
- Theme music composer: Jack C. Arnold
- Country of origin: United Kingdom
- Original language: English

Production
- Producers: Polly Leys; Kate Norrish
- Cinematography: Richard Mott
- Editor: Billy Sneddon
- Running time: 90 minutes
- Production companies: Talkback Thames; HillBilly Television

Original release
- Network: BBC Four
- Release: 19 October 2011

Holy Flying Circus is a 90-minute BBC television comedy film first broadcast in 2011, written by Tony Roche and directed by Owen Harris.

The film is a "Pythonesque" dramatisation of events following the completion of Monty Python's Life of Brian, culminating in the televised debate about the film broadcast in 1979.

== Plot ==
At a meeting in the offices of their film distributor, the members of Monty Python discuss allowing the film Life of Brian to be released in America first because of America's first amendment. John Cleese voices his support for the idea, and says that he loves Americans. We then see American reporters at a screening of the movie where a near riot is taking place, with the protesters condemning the film as "blasphemous". The Pythons review a disheartening statement made by a religious leader, implying that the film causes violence. Cleese misinterprets this (possibly deliberately) and goes off on a tangent about little kids carrying out copycat crucifixions on their friends. Their distributor, Barry, suggests a low profile approach for the UK release so as not to cause too much upset. "Let's not project an advert onto the side of Westminster Abbey or make Life of Brian Christmas crackers".

Much of the film is taken up with preparations for a debate on the BBC2 chat show Friday Night, Saturday Morning. Initially, the Pythons are reluctant to take part but decide that Cleese and Michael Palin should represent the troupe on the programme. Palin's wife is depicted with a remarkable resemblance to Terry Jones (Rufus Jones plays both parts). The production team of the BBC chat show eventually manage to gain a commitment from Malcolm Muggeridge and Mervyn Stockwood, then the Bishop of Southwark, to oppose the two Pythons. Portions of this televised discussion are recreated towards the end of the film.

== Cast ==
- Darren Boyd as John Cleese
- Charles Edwards as Michael Palin
- Steve Punt as Eric Idle
- Rufus Jones as Terry Jones and Palin's Wife
- Tom Fisher as Graham Chapman
- Phil Nichol as Terry Gilliam
- Michael Cochrane as Malcolm Muggeridge
- Roy Marsden as Bishop of Southwark
- Tom Price as Tim Rice
- Stephen Fry as God
- Ben Crispin as Jesus
- Simon Greenall as Barry Atkins
- Paul Chahidi as Harry Balls
- Jason Thorpe as Alan Dick / Desmond Lovely
- Mark Heap as Andrew Thorogood

== Title sequence ==
The title sequence for the film was created using a two metre tall Terry Gilliam-inspired Phonotrope created by Jim Le Fevre. It consisted of over 2000 laser-cut frames and was 1.2 metres wide at its base.

== Reception ==
The film received mixed reviews from critics, while receiving just over half a million viewers on BBC Four and proving very popular on iPlayer. Chris Harvey of The Telegraph wrote, "Constantly inventive, often very funny, the drama followed a fictional religious group intent on pillorying the Pythons and having Life of Brian banned", although he added that it "abandoned some of its humour and subtlety for preachiness." Phil Dyess-Nugent at The A.V. Club praised the concept and most of the performances, but said: "At the risk of committing blasphemy myself, one problem may be that the filmmakers actually love the Pythons too much. If that is a problem, it was probably an insurmountable one, since no one who only loves Python to a sane and reasonable degree was ever going to conceive the idea for this movie."
