= Friday Night, Saturday Morning =

British TV talk show (1979–1982)

- Genre: Talk show
- Created by: Iain Johnstone; Will Wyatt
- Directed by: Phil Chilvers, John Burrowes
- Presented by: Ned Sherrin; Tim Rice; Jane Walmsley
- Theme music composer: André Jacquemin; Dave Howman
- Country of origin: United Kingdom
- Original language: English
- No. of series: 6
- No. of episodes: 64 (list of episodes)

Production
- Producers: Iain Johnstone; Frances Whitaker
- Production locations: Greenwood Theatre, London

Original release
- Network: BBC2
- Release: 28 September 1979 – 2 April 1982

Friday Night, Saturday Morning is a British television chat show with a revolving guest host rotation. It ran on BBC2 from 28 September 1979 to 2 April 1982, broadcast live from the Greenwood Theatre, a part of Guy's Hospital. It was notable for being the only television show to be hosted by a former British Prime Minister (Harold Wilson), and for an argument about the blasphemy claims surrounding the film Monty Python's Life of Brian (1979).

The programme was the idea of Iain Johnstone and Will Wyatt, who insisted on a changing presenter every fortnight. Another innovation was that the presenters chose the guests they were to interview.

== Harold Wilson ==
The editions of 12 and 19 October 1979 were the first television shows ever hosted by a former or sitting British prime minister. Harold Wilson had resigned as Prime Minister three years earlier. A media-savvy personality, he seemed a promising host for a talk show, an experiment now seen as a failure. Wilson was at a loss, often leaving gaps while he tried to think of a question to ask his guests, notably Harry Secombe. When asked what Shakespearean roles she would have wished to have played, Pat Phoenix listed some, then said wistfully, "... but I'm a bit past it now." Failing to pick up on this, Wilson attempted to ask another question, at which point Phoenix exclaimed, "Say 'No'!" In 2000, Friday Night, Saturday Morning was voted in the "100 TV Moments from Hell" by Channel 4. One critic described Wilson's reading the autocue as if it were the Rosetta Stone.

Producer Iain Johnstone later attributed Wilson's poor performance to memory loss. It may have been an early sign of the Alzheimer's disease which caused Wilson's later dementia.

== Monty Python's Life of Brian ==
(from left to right) The Rt Rev. Mervyn Stockwood, Bishop of Southwark; Malcolm Muggeridge; John Cleese; and Michael Palin, on Friday Night, Saturday Morning. Bishop Stockwood is telling Cleese and Palin "you'll get your thirty pieces of silver".

On the edition of 9 November 1979, hosted by Tim Rice, a discussion was held about the then newly released film Monty Python's Life of Brian, which had been banned by many local councils and caused protests throughout the world with accusations that it was blasphemous. To argue in favour of this accusation were veteran broadcaster and noted Christian Malcolm Muggeridge, and The Rt Rev. Mervyn Stockwood, the then Bishop of Southwark. In defence of the film were two members of the Monty Python team, John Cleese and Michael Palin.

According to Monty Python - The Case Against, by Robert Hewison, the show "began affably enough, with Cleese and Palin talking on their own to their host, Tim Rice – himself the lyricist of Jesus Christ Superstar, which had also faced accusations of blasphemy a decade earlier". Hewison continues, "but while a second clip from the film was being shown, Stockwood and Muggeridge were brought on to the set. The full effect of the entry of the Bishop in his sweeping purple cassock and chunky cross was missed by the television audience, who found him already seated beside a bronzed and gleaming Malcolm Muggeridge when the film excerpt ended. Rice explained that Stockwood and Muggeridge had seen the film earlier in the day and invited their comments. With that, the gloves were off."

The debate quickly became heated and included the following exchange:

Muggeridge: "I started off by saying that this is such a tenth-rate film that I don't believe that it would disturb anybody's faith."

Palin: "Yes, I know you started with an open mind; I realise that."

The Pythons initially seemed shocked by the aggression of the attack, especially because all four had met before the show, when there had been no hint as to what was to come.

The Bishop made the point that without Jesus this film would not exist, and ignored the Pythons' protestations that the film was about the abuse of faith, not faith itself.

In his diaries, published in 2006, Michael Palin wrote of the Bishop:

"He began, with notes carefully hidden in his crotch, tucked down well out of camera range, to give a short sermon, addressed not to John or myself but to the audience. In the first three or four minutes he had brought in Nicolae Ceauşescu and Mao Tse-tung and not begun to make one point about the film. Then he began to turn to the movie. He accused us of making a mockery of the work of Mother Teresa, of being undergraduate and mentally unstable. He made these remarks with all the smug and patronising paraphernalia of the gallery-player, who believes that the audience will see he is right, because he is a bishop and we're not".

Muggeridge complained about the ease with which the Pythons "were able to extract humour from the most solemn of mysteries". He said he was upset that this film was, to him, denigrating the one man who inspired every great artist, writer, composer, etc. Cleese was keen to point out that there were other religions, and that civilisation existed before Christ. Michael Palin says of this incident in the book The Pythons, edited by Bob McCabe, that when Muggeridge said "that Christianity had been responsible for more good in the world than any other force in history", Cleese said "what about the Spanish Inquisition?"

The studio audience appeared to be on the side of the Pythons throughout, especially when Cleese said, "four hundred years ago, we would have been burnt for this film. Now, I'm suggesting that we've made an advance."

At some points, the Pythons tried to control the audience, who, they felt, were showing inappropriate partisanship in their favour.

Cleese, defending the film, went on to say that it was about "closed systems of thought, whether they are political or theological or religious or whatever: systems by which, whatever evidence is given to a person, he merely adapts it, fits it into his ideology".

John Cleese tells Malcolm Muggeridge that "four hundred years ago, we would have been burnt for this film. Now, I'm suggesting that we've made an advance."

As the debate went on, the Pythons found it harder to be polite. According to Palin, the Bishop was "outrageously dismissing any points we made as 'rubbish' or 'unworthy of an educated man'".

Bishop Stockwood was particularly upset at the use of the crucifixion, forgetting the distinction between it as Christian symbol and its use as a traditional Roman punishment. The debate ended with the Bishop pointing at the Pythons and saying "you'll get your thirty pieces of silver".

Cleese has frequently said that he enjoyed the debate, because, he believed, the film was "completely intellectually defensible". However, after viewing the debate again in 2013 for BBC Radio 4's Today programme, Cleese said that it left him bored and he realised that there was no attempt at a proper discussion, or to find any common ground.

Palin told McCabe: "It turned out, after the show, that they'd missed the first fifteen minutes of the film, because they'd been having a nice lunch. John was brilliant in that show. I remember it used to be Douglas Adams's favourite bit of television ... He thought it was such a rivetting piece of TV, and it really is". Palin also claimed that, after the discussion, both his foes said "How pathetic, hopeless and meaningless and juvenile it was. Instead of there being any sort of division between us afterwards, they came up as though we'd all been 'showbiz' together, out doing an entertainment, with the Bishop saying 'That all seemed to go very well'. I hadn't realised they weren't being vindictive, they were just performing to the crowd."

Also backstage, according to Palin, he had met Raymond Johnston from the Nationwide Festival of Light, a prominent Christian group who had been campaigning to have Life of Brian banned. Instead of aggression, though, Johnston was most complimentary to Palin, saying he had been embarrassed by the performance of the Bishop. Palin says "[Johnston] had found it quite clear that Brian and Jesus were separate people", and that the film was making some "very valid points about organised religions".

Looking back, Michael Palin recalled in The Guardian: "[w]e had done our homework, thinking we were going to get into quite a tough theological argument, but it turned out to be virtually a slanging match. We were very surprised by that. I don't get angry very often, but I got incandescent with rage at their attitude and the smugness of it". Cleese preferred to sum it all up by saying "I always felt we won that one by behaving better than the Christians".

The programme and the events surrounding it were told in a Pythonesque fashion in the television film Holy Flying Circus, broadcast on BBC Four in October 2011.

After this debate, a parody of the discussion appeared on the satirical comedy show Not The Nine O'Clock News. Chaired by a host played by Pamela Stephenson (who herself would later appear as a guest on Friday Night, Saturday Morning), the parody discussion involved a bishop (played by Rowan Atkinson) defending his new film, General Synod's Life of Christ, which was accused of being "a thinly disguised and blasphemous attack on the members of Monty Python, men who are, today, still revered throughout the western world."

== Episode guide ==
There were 64 editions broadcast over six series.

=== Series 1 ===
| Date | Host | Guests |
|---|---|---|
| 28 September 1979 | Ned Sherrin | Christopher Reeve, Willie Rushton, John Wells, Arianna Stassinopoulos, Alan Coren, David Halverstone and Linda Lewis |
| 5 October 1979 | Ned Sherrin | Willie Rushton, John Wells, Arianna Stassinopoulos, Emma Soames, Gerard Kenny, Secret Affair, Ian Page, Jimmy Pursey, Antonia Fraser |
| 12 October 1979 | Harold Wilson | Harry Secombe, Pat Phoenix, Tony Benn, Freddie Trueman and Sponooch |
| 19 October 1979 | Harold Wilson | Mike Yarwood, Robin Day, Winston Churchill MP, Mary Wilson, Dean Friedman |
| 26 October 1979 | Alan Brien | Russell Davies, Harold Evans, Sponooch, Jilly Cooper, Prof. Peter Townsend, Lord Melchett, Peter York, Lynda Hayes, Will Elsworth-Jones, and Jeremy Child, Norman Bird, Ronnie Brody in a sketch |
| 2 November 1979 | Tim Rice | Tom Stoppard, Bob Willis, George Martin, Elaine Paige and The Searchers. |
| 9 November 1979 | Tim Rice | John Cleese, Michael Palin, Malcolm Muggeridge, Arthur Mervyn Stockwood (the Bishop of Southwark), Norris McWhirter, Paul Jones and The Blues Band |
| 16 November 1979 | Cambridge Footlights | Martin Bergman, Hugh Laurie, Robert Bathurst, Emma Thompson, Peter Cook |
| 7 December 1979 | Willie Rushton | Barry Cryer, Peter Glaze, Seid Saeid, Sponooch, Andy Williams, The Alberts |
| 14 December 1979 | Jackie Stewart | Henry Cooper, James Hunt, Eddie Kidd, Barry Humphries (as Dame Edna Everage), Sponooch |
| 21 December 1979 | Ned Sherrin | Geoff Greenfield, Arianna Stassinopoulos, John Wells, Willie Rushton, Andrew Boyle, John Bird, Sponooch, Paul Jones and The Blues Band. |

=== Series 2 ===
| Date | Host | Guests |
|---|---|---|
| 18 January 1980 | Ned Sherrin | Timothy West, Denis Follows, James Wellbeloved, David Bedford, Richard Ingrams, John Wells, Russell Davies, Jonathan King, John Bird, Amii Stewart |
| 25 January 1980 | Ned Sherrin | Terry Jones, Marti Webb, Andrew Lloyd Webber, Peter Nichols, John Wells, Peter McKay, Richard Boston |
| 1 February 1980 | Ned Sherrin | Meryl Streep, Paul Goodman, Ian Russell, Barbara Woodhouse, John Wells, Richard Ingrams, Paul Callen, Stan McMurtry |
| 8 February 1980 | Ned Sherrin | John Mortimer, Audrey Whitting, Patrick Montague-Smith, Lezlee Carling, John Wells, George Melly, Nigel Dempster, Simon Hoggart |
| 15 February 1980 | Ned Sherrin | Wayne Sleep, Gerard Kenny, Auberon Waugh, A. J. Ayer, John Wells, Hugh Sykes, Valerie Grove |
| 22 February 1980 | Ned Sherrin | Quentin Crisp, Arianna and Agape Stassinopoulos, Corky Hale, Nigel Williams, Germaine Greer, John Wells |
| 29 February 1980 | Tim Rice | Mike Brearley, Rick Wakeman, John Lill, Pamela Stephenson, Joseph Wambaugh |
| 7 March 1980 | Jane Walmsley | Zandra Rhodes, Terry Gilliam, Hazel O'Connor, Esther Samson, Anthony Shrimsley |
| 14 March 1980 | Tim Rice | Mike Batt, Tom Conti, Tina Brown, David Essex, Colin Blunstone |
| 21 March 1980 | Terry Wogan | Larry Hagman, John Wells, Frank Hall |

=== Series 3 ===
| Date | Host | Guests |
|---|---|---|
| 26 September 1980 | Tim Rice | Michael Parkinson, Dickie Bird, Dave Edmunds and Carlene Carter, Nick Lowe, Peter Lush, Marvin Hamlisch |
| 3 October 1980 | Desmond Morris | Andrea Newman, Gerard Kenny, Lynn Barber, Grahame Dangerfield, Prof Randolph Quirk, Betty Fitzpatrick |
| 10 October 1980 | Tim Rice | Christopher Matthews, Helene Hanff, The Hollies, Allan Clarke, and David Bowie from Broadway |
| 17 October 1980 | Tim Rice | B. A. Robertson, Kingsley Amis |
| 24 October 1980 | Clive Jenkins | Peter Corey, Saul Reichlin, Alan Simpson, Karolina Larusdottir, Neil Kinnock, Peregrine Worsthorne, Sioned Williams, Marion Montgomery |
| 31 October 1980 | Jane Walmsley | Elizabeth St George, Lois Bourne, Esther Rantzen, The Flatbuckers, Ian Dury, Bob Worcester, Bonnie Angelo, Rik Mayall |
| 7 November 1980 | Jackie Collins | Paula Yates, Jean Rook, Dennis Waterman, Phil Palmer, Bryan Ferry, Bruce Oldfield, Marie Helvin, Wendy Medway, Peter York |
| 14 November 1980 | Martin Bergman | Emma Thompson, Hugh Laurie, Robert Bathurst, Rory McGrath, John Bardon |
| 21 November 1980 | Simon Hoggart | Roy Hattersley, Peter Marsh, Tom Bussman, Trudi Pacter, Stewart Sanderson, Lynda Hayes |
| 28 November 1980 | Toyah | Vivian Stanshall, Christopher Biggins, Steve Strange, Derek Jarman |
| 5 December 1980 | Laurie Taylor | Viv Nicholson, Tom O'Connor, Anthony Clare, James Fox, Lindsey Moore, Fay Weldon, Harriet Harman |
| 12 December 1980 | Ned Sherrin | Sheena Easton, Norman St John-Stevas, Lord Longford, George Brown, John Wells, Willie Rushton, Rob Buckman, Nigel Dempster |
| 19 December 1980 | Ned Sherrin | Dai Llewellyn, Frederick Forsyth, David Puttnam, John Boulting, Christopher Walken, Bertice Reading, John Wells, Willie Rushton, Mike Harding |

=== Series 4 ===
| Date | Host | Guests |
|---|---|---|
| 30 January 1981 | Jane Walmsley | Felicity Kendal, Harry Chapin, Fania Fénelon, Derek Jameson, Nigel Dempster, Susan Isaacs, 20th Century Coyote |
| 6 February 1981 | Clare Francis | Hammond Innes, Ken Follett, Beryl Reid, Dr. Richard Mackarness, Baby Grand, Julie Walters, Jim Parker |
| 13 February 1981 | Simon Hoggart | Kiri Te Kanawa, Barry Took, Kenneth Williams, Malcolm Bradbury, Dr Keith Stolls, Rio and the Robots |
| 20 February 1981 | Robert Lacey | Prince Abdullah Al-Saud, Barbara Cartland, Aboud Abdel-Ali and Orchestra, Hula Al-Rasheed, Fatima Shaker, John Glubb, Peter Whitehead |
| 27 February 1981 | Lorin Maazel | Edward Heath, Alan Coren, Ellen Burstyn, Doreen Wells, Edward Fox |
| 6 March 1981 | Geoffrey Robertson | Jill Craigie, Lesley-Anne Down, Clive James, Peter Hain, Lynda Hayes, 20th Century Coyote |
| 13 March 1981 | Anouska Hempel | Gloria Swanson, Sissy Spacek, David Hicks, Terence Conran, Richard Rogers, Candida Lycett-Green, Lezlee Carling |
| 20 March 1981 | Tim Rice | Richard Jenner-Fust, Jane Darling, Bill Drysdale, Petra Siniawski, Shirley Williams, Hank Marvin, Richard Huggett, Dr Anne Smith, Leslee Carling |
| 27 March 1981 | Michael Wood | Sid Waddell, Sylvia Kristel, Baron Brockway, Denis Law, Hank Wangford, Peter Sykes |
| 3 April 1981 | Barry Norman | Terry Waite, Philippe Edmonds, Pamela Stephenson, Kit Hain |

=== Series 5 ===
| Date | Host | Guests |
|---|---|---|
| 6 November 1981 | Terry Jones | Richard Mabey, Colin MacCabe, Helen Mirren, Bernard Williams, Rosalie Bertell, Elkie Brooks, National Theatre of Brent |
| 13 November 1981 | Tim Rice | Julian Lloyd Webber, Bill Hartson, David Steel, Tracey Ullman, Geoffrey Burgon, Adam Ant |
| 20 November 1981 | Desmond Morris | Freddie Hancock, David Cockcroft, Lucy Colbeck, Kit Williams, Rod Argent, Kit Hain, Ian Greaves, Kate Bush, Susanna Kubelka, Bettine le Beau, Dr Robert Burchfield and The Outer Limits |
| 27 November 1981 | Maria Aitken | Edward Hibbert, Anthony Andrews, Jonathan Lynn, Rob Buckman, Ian Hall |
| 4 December 1981 | Derek Jameson | Johnny Speight, Russell Harty, Su Arnold, Sue Wilkinson and Stiff All Stars |
| 11 December 1981 | Geoffrey Robertson | Robyn Archer, Lord Colville, Jan Kavan, Jessica Mitford, Jill Tweedie, Christopher Logue, Denise Coffey, Phillip Hodson |
| 18 December 1981 | Jane Walmsley | Maureen Lipman, Jonathan King, Malcolm McLaren, D. M. Thomas, Kevin Mulhern, Russell Davies, Sue Wilkinson and Steve Caudal |

=== Series 6 ===
| Date | Host | Guests |
|---|---|---|
| 8 January 1982 | Tim Rice | Selina Scott, Kevin Godley and Lol Creme, Michel Roux, Sonia Stevenson, Richard Shepherd |
| 15 January 1982 | Jane Walmsley | Germaine Greer, Ken Livingstone, Auberon Waugh, Nigel Dempster, Roger Rees, Streetwalker |
| 22 January 1982 | B. A. Robertson | Tommy Docherty, Associates, Gillian Gregory, Phil Oakey, Ruth Herring, Mike Read |
| 29 January 1982 | Clare Francis | Tristran Jones, Robert Palmer, The Outer Limits, Roger Royle, Des Wilson, Elspet Gray |
| 5 February 1982 | Laurie Taylor | Trevor Griffiths, Nell Dunn, Juice on the Loose, Ron Kavana, French and Saunders, Ray Gosling, Beryl Bainbridge |
| 12 February 1982 | Frank Delaney | Siân Phillips, Anthony Burgess, Paul Theroux, Robert McCrum, Gillie McPherson |
| 19 February 1982 | Germaine Greer | Mary Whitehouse, David Sullivan, Noel Dilly, Viviene Ventura, Graham Chapman, The Stranglers |
| 26 February 1982 | Brian Glover | Peter Marsh, Molly Parkin, Elaine Loudon, Frank Keating, Oasis. |
| 5 March 1982 | Frank Delaney | Penny Junor, Nigel Nicolson, J. T. Edson, Victoria Glendinning, Gillie McPherson |
| 12 March 1982 | Michael Wood | Tariq Ali, Richard Clutterbuck, Christopher Hill, Tom Nairn |
| 19 March 1982 | Diana Quick | Jane Gibson, Merry Conway, Jay Geary, Victoria Wood, The Great Soprendo, Bill Campbell, Jacko Fossett, Colin Harper, Sarah Mortimer |
| 26 March 1982 | Alexander Chancellor | Jeffrey Bernard, Taki, Carlos Bonell, Jo Grimond, April Ashley, Harriet Waugh |
| 2 April 1982 | Jane Walmsley | Buzz, Julian Barnes, Jocelyn Stevens, David Puttnam, Colin Welland, David Soul, John McVicar, Gareth Hunt, Jeremy Nichols, Terry Walsh, Allen Whalley |
