= St Matthew's Church, Moorfields =

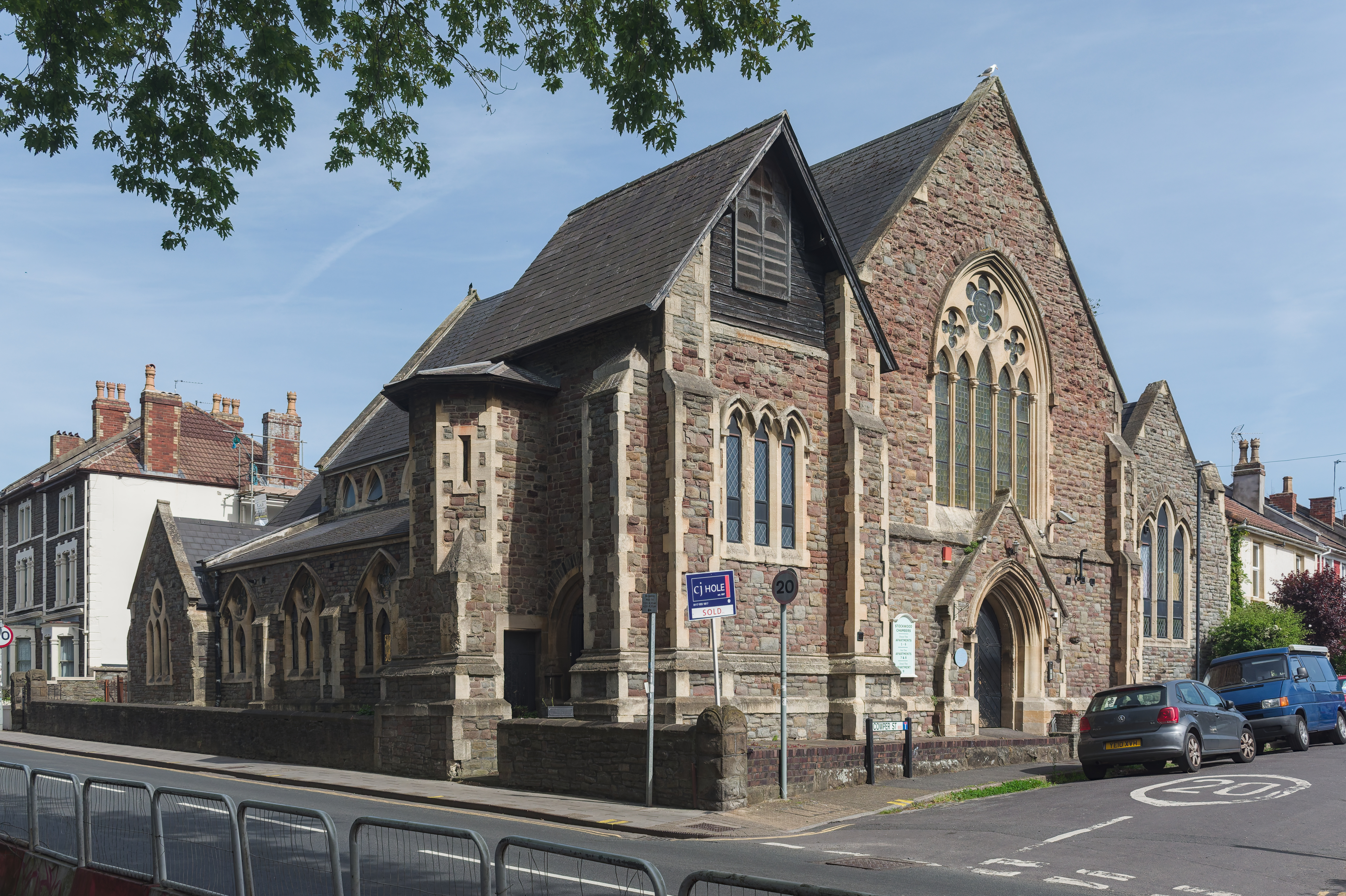
- St Matthew's Church

- Location within Bristol

General information
- Location: Bristol, England
- Coordinates: 51.4582°N 2.5595°W
- Construction started: 1873
- Completed: 1887

Design and construction
- Architect: J.C. Neale

St Matthew's Church was an Anglican parish church in Bristol, England. It was located in the west of Redfield, on Church Road (formerly Redfield Road), part of the A420.

The church was built in 1873 to serve the new parish of Moorfields, formed from parts of the parishes of St George and Easton. The church was constructed in Gothic style to the design of J.C. Neale, although the south aisle was not built until 1887.

Mervyn Stockwood, later Bishop of Southwark, was curate here from 1936 to 1941, and vicar from 1941 to 1955. From 1945 to 1948 John Robinson, later Bishop of Woolwich and author of Honest to God, was curate at St Matthew's as his first position after ordination.

The church was closed in 1999, and has now been converted into apartments and offices, known as Stockwood Chambers. The former parish now forms part of the parish of St Luke with Christ Church, Barton Hill and St Matthew, Moorfields.
