= Tom Butler (bishop) =

British retired Anglican bishop

The Right Reverend Tom Butler
- Bishop of Southwark
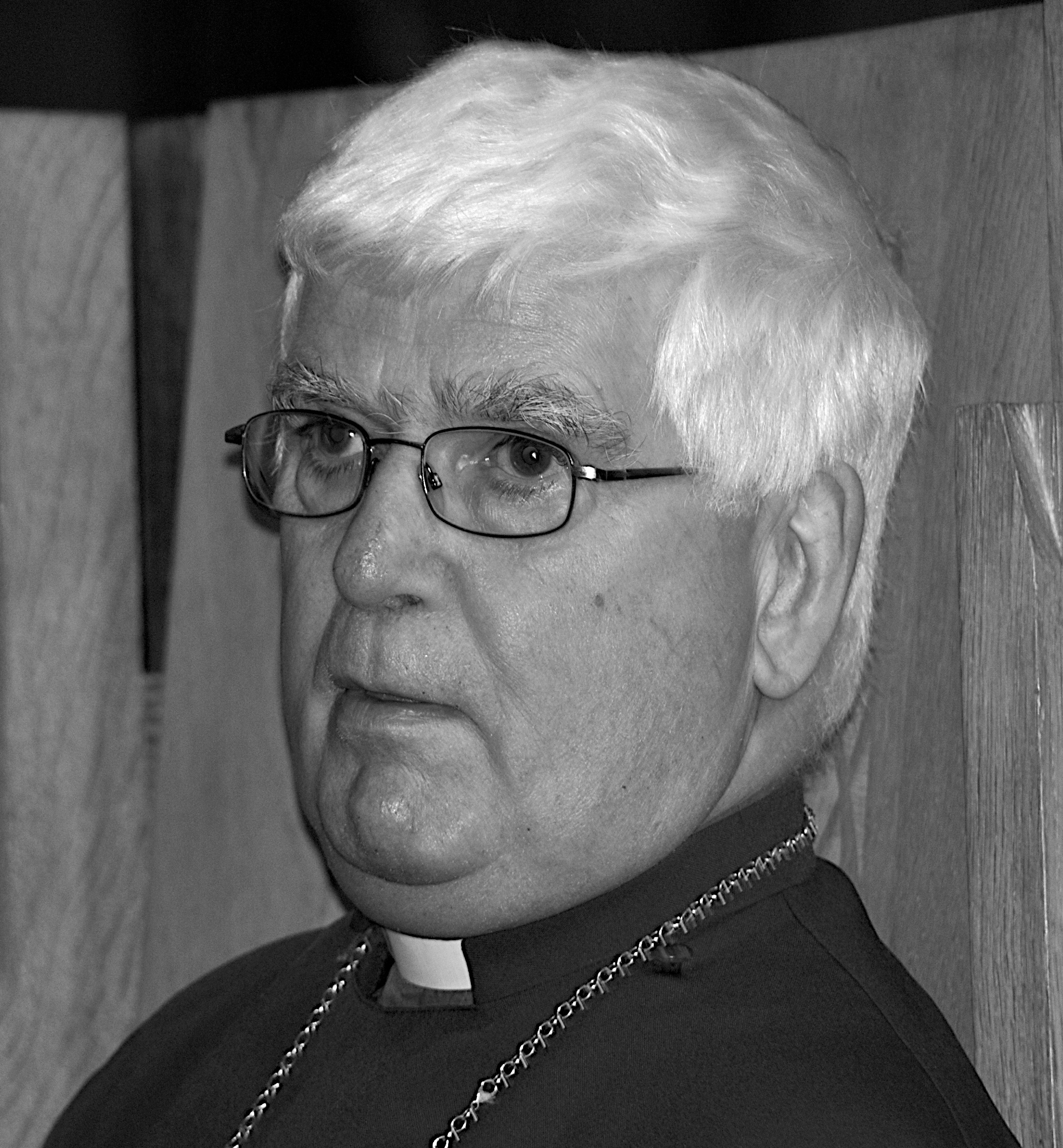
- Butler at Southwark Cathedral in 2009
- Diocese: Diocese of Southwark
- In office: 1998–2010 (retired)
- Predecessor: Roy Williamson
- Successor: Christopher Chessun
- Other posts: Archdeacon of Northolt (1980–1985); Bishop of Willesden (1985–1991); Bishop of Leicester (1991–1998); Honorary assistant bishop (Leeds; 2014–present) see § Retirement

Orders
- Ordination: 1964 (deacon); 1965 (priest)
- Consecration: 1985

Personal details
- Born: 5 March 1940 (age 86) Birmingham, Warwickshire
- Denomination: Anglican
- Spouse: Barbara Butler
- Children: 2 adult
- Occupation: Academic and author
- Education: University of Leeds

Member of the House of Lords
- Lord Spiritual
- Bishop of Southwark; 27 October 1998 – 5 March 2010
- Bishop of Leicester; 10 February 1997 – 27 October 1998

Thomas Frederick Butler (born 5 March 1940) is a British retired Anglican bishop. He was the ninth Anglican Bishop of Southwark. He was enthroned in Southwark Cathedral on 12 September 1998. He retired from this position on 5 March 2010. In 2014, Butler was involved in the transition process for the new Diocese of Leeds as "mentor bishop"; he remains an honorary assistant bishop of that diocese.

== Early life and education ==
Born in Birmingham, Butler attended King Edward VI Five Ways school in Birmingham and the University of Leeds, where he obtained a first class honours BSc, an MSc and PhD in electronics. He trained for ordination with the Mirfield Fathers at the College of the Resurrection in Yorkshire.

== Ordained ministry ==
After ordination in 1964, he served three years as a curate in the Diocese of Ely and Diocese of Canterbury before spending 12 years as a lecturer in electronics and a chaplain at the University of Zambia and then at the University of Kent in Canterbury. During this period he was on the staff of Lusaka Cathedral and Canterbury Cathedral respectively. From 1980 to 1985, Butler was the Archdeacon of Northolt in the Diocese of London.

Butler was consecrated as a bishop on 30 November 1985, by Robert Runcie, Archbishop of Canterbury, at St Paul's Cathedral, to become area Bishop of Willesden until he was appointed diocesan Bishop of Leicester in 1991 (his election was confirmed on 1 July) and translated to Southwark in 1998.

Butler has been active at national and international level. Until 1995 he chaired the follow-up to "Faith in the City", which published the controversial "Staying in the City" report. He chaired the General Synod's Board of Mission from 1995 until 2001 and is now vice-chair Public Affairs of the Mission and Public Affairs Council. He is also Chair of the Governors of Ripon College, Cuddesdon. He served as the General Synod representative on the Inner Cities Religious Council, an initiative set up by the Department of the Environment, until 2001. Since mid-2003 the Bishop has represented the Church of England on the central committee of the World Council of Churches. He entered the House of Lords in 1997.

Butler's beliefs were cited as the reason for some "valid but irregular" ordinations in his diocese. Andy Fenton, Richard Perkins and Loots Lambrechts were ordained in November 2005 at Christ Church, Surbiton, London, by Martin Morrison, a bishop of the Church of England in South Africa. Morrison was brought in by Richard Coekin, minister of Dundonald Church in Wimbledon, due to a dispute with Butler over matters related to homosexuality. Coekin subsequently had his licence to officiate revoked by Butler, but he was reinstated following an appeal to the Archbishop of Canterbury.

In December 2006, Butler returned home from a function at the Irish embassy in London with a head injury, which he claimed to be unable to remember sustaining. He contacted the police claiming that he had been mugged. It was subsequently suggested in the media that Butler, apparently under the influence of alcohol, had sustained the injury while being removed from a stranger's car into which he had apparently climbed. The incident has become legendary due to the detail which suggested he was throwing Christmas gifts from the car whilst saying 'I am the Bishop of Southwark, it's what I do'. In an interview with John Humphrys on BBC Radio 4's Today Programme, Butler reiterated his statement that he had not been drinking heavily but said that he was worried that he still could not account for three hours of the evening in question and was undergoing medical tests. He gave the Thought for the Day on the same date. Known in the church as a strong disciplinarian, particularly when dealing with junior clergy caught under the influence of alcohol, Butler faced calls for his resignation from some quarters.

Butler is a regular contributor to Radio 4's Thought for the Day and has taken part in many other national and local TV and radio programmes. He has also co-authored two books with his wife Barbara: Just Mission and Just Spirituality in a World of Faiths. On 7 September 2009 he announced that he would retire on his 70th birthday, 5 March 2010.

== Marriage and family ==
Barbara Butler, his wife, is the executive secretary of Christians Aware, a charity that is involved in education and development. They have two grown-up children and four grandchildren.

== Retirement ==
He retired to Wakefield, where he has been licensed as an honorary assistant bishop ever since – first of the Diocese of Wakefield and then of the Diocese of Leeds. During the "transformation period" when the dioceses of Ripon & Leeds, of Wakefield and of Bradford were dissolved and the new Leeds diocese founded, Butler served as "mentor bishop" for the new diocese (having previously been diocesan bishop of a large diocese with an area scheme), as acting diocesan Bishop of Bradford (while its final bishop, Nick Baines – whom Butler first worked with as Bishop of Croydon in 2003 – was on sabbatical, February–April 2014), then (20–22 April 2014) as acting diocesan bishop of Leeds, and as interim area bishop of Bradford (April–December 2014).

== Styles ==
- Tom Butler Esq (1940–?)
- Dr Tom Butler (?–1964)
- The Reverend Dr Tom Butler (1964–1980)
- The Venerable Dr Tom Butler (1980–1985)
- The Right Reverend Dr Tom Butler (1985—present)
