= Bishop Williamson =

Bishop Williamson may refer to:

- Roy Williamson (bishop) (born 1932), retired religious leader in the Church of England
- Richard Williamson (1940–2025), traditionalist Catholic bishop
