= Valid but irregular =

Valid but irregular is a term used in Christian churches which have a concept of Holy Orders, such as the Anglican churches, to sacramental actions by someone who is able, due to their already being ordained to the appropriate orders, to carry out the action but does not have the required authority to do so. The term is analogous to that of "valid but illicit" used in the Roman Catholic Church.

Notable examples of acts declared "valid but irregular" include:

- The ordination of 11 women as priests by bishops of the Episcopal Church in the United States of America in Philadelphia in 1974, before that church had explicitly authorized women to be ordained.
- The consecration of John Rodgers and Chuck Murphy as bishops in Singapore in 2000 by bishops of the Anglican churches of Rwanda and South East Asia, to serve as missionary bishops in the United States.
- The ordination of Andy Fenton, Richard Perkins and Loots Lambrechts in November 2005 at Christ Church, Surbiton, London, by Bishop Martin Morrison of the Church of England in South Africa, a Reformed church outside of the Anglican Communion. Morrison was brought in by Richard Coekin, minister of Dundonald Church in Wimbledon, due to a dispute with the then Bishop of Southwark, Tom Butler, over matters related to homosexuality. Coekin subsequently had his licence as a priest revoked by Butler, but he was reinstated following an appeal to the Archbishop of Canterbury.
- The consecration of William Murdoch and Bill Atwood in August 2007 at All Saints' Cathedral, Nairobi by the then Archbishop of Kenya, Benjamin Nzimbi. The two men were from United States and the intention was that they would serve as bishops for conservative Anglicans in the United States who have left the Anglican Communion because of the perceived liberal direction of the Episcopal Church.
- The ordination of three men from London in Kenya in May 2011. The men, who have not been named as of 21 July 2011, are part of a church-planting group led by Richard Coekin (also mentioned above). Again, a rationale for these ordinations being considered irregular was put forward by the current Bishop of Southwark, Christopher Chessun who takes a more tolerant view towards homosexuality than that taken by the men at the time of their ordination. The men will be linked with the Anglican Mission in England, a network of churches that separated from the Church of England and the Anglican Communion shortly after the ordinations and that seeks to promote traditional Christian doctrine. The events were criticised in a statement by Lambeth Palace.

== See also ==
- Validity and liceity (Catholic Church)
