= 1998–99 Football Conference =

Football Conference
- Season: 1998–99
- Champions: Cheltenham Town (1st Football Conference title)
- Direct promotion: Cheltenham Town
- Conference League Cup winners: Doncaster Rovers
- FA Trophy winners: Kingstonian (1st FA Trophy title)
- Relegated to Level 6: Barrow, Farnborough Town, Leek Town
- Matches: 462
- Goals: 1,192 (2.58 per match)
- Top goalscorer: (England) Carl Alford (Stevenage Borough), 26
- Biggest home win: Leek Town – Morecambe 7–0 (25 August 1998)
- Biggest away win: Farnborough Town – Morecambe 1–6 (12 December 1998); Farnborough Town – Northwich Victoria 1–6 (20 March 1999)
- Highest scoring: Doncaster Rovers – Dover Athletic 5–4 (19 December 1998); Yeovil Town – Farnborough Town 6–3 (28 December 1998)
- Longest winning run: Cheltenham Town, Rushden & Diamonds, 6 matches
- Longest unbeaten run: Cheltenham Town, 17 matches
- Longest losing run: Leek Town, 10 matches
- Highest attendance: Rushden & Diamonds v Cheltenham Town, 6,312 (3 April 1999)
- Lowest attendance: ?
- Average attendance: 1,627 (+ 10.23% compared with the previous season)

The Football Conference season of 1998–99 was the twentieth season of the Football Conference.

== Changes since the previous season ==
- Doncaster Rovers (relegated from the Football League 1997–98)
- Barrow (promoted 1997–98)
- Forest Green Rovers (promoted 1997–98)
- Kingstonian (promoted 1997–98)

== Locations ==
Locations of the Football Conference 1998–1999 teams
Locations of the Football Conference London teams 1998–1999

== Final league table ==
Pos	Team	Pld	W	D	L	GF	GA	GD	Pts	Promotion or relegation
1	Cheltenham Town (C, P)	42	22	14	6	71	36	+35	80	Promotion to the Football League Third Division
2	Kettering Town	42	22	10	10	58	37	+21	76	
3	Hayes	42	22	8	12	63	50	+13	74	
4	Rushden & Diamonds	42	20	12	10	71	42	+29	72	
5	Yeovil Town	42	20	11	11	68	54	+14	71	
6	Stevenage Borough	42	17	17	8	62	45	+17	68	
7	Northwich Victoria	42	19	9	14	60	51	+9	66	
8	Kingstonian	42	17	13	12	50	49	+1	64	
9	Woking	42	18	9	15	51	45	+6	63	
10	Hednesford Town	42	15	16	11	49	44	+5	61	
11	Dover Athletic	42	15	13	14	54	48	+6	58	
12	Forest Green Rovers	42	15	13	14	55	50	+5	58	
13	Hereford United	42	15	10	17	49	46	+3	55	
14	Morecambe	42	15	8	19	60	76	−16	53	
15	Kidderminster Harriers	42	14	9	19	56	52	+4	51	
16	Doncaster Rovers	42	12	12	18	51	55	−4	48	
17	Telford United	42	10	16	16	44	60	−16	46	
18	Southport	42	10	15	17	47	59	−12	45	
19	Barrow (R)	42	11	10	21	40	63	−23	43	Demoted to the Northern Premier League Premier Division (Note: Barrow were relegated to the Northern Premier League Premier Division due to entering administration.)
20	Welling United	42	9	14	19	44	65	−21	41	
21	Leek Town (R)	42	8	8	26	48	76	−28	32	Relegation to the Northern Premier League Premier Division
22	Farnborough Town (R)	42	7	11	24	41	89	−48	32	Relegation to the Isthmian League Premier Division

(C) Champions; (P) Promoted; (R) Relegated

== Results ==
Home \ Away	BRW	CHL	DON	DOV	FAR	FGR	HAY	HED	HER	KET	KID	KIN	LEE	MOR	NOR	R&D	SOU	STB	TEL	WEL	WOK	YEO
Barrow		1–1	2–2	1–0	1–0	2–1	0–1	0–2	0–1	0–0	0–4	0–1	2–1	2–1	0–1	0–2	0–0	0–1	1–1	2–1	1–2	2–0
Cheltenham Town	4–1		2–1	1–1	0–0	1–1	3–3	0–0	2–2	3–0	1–0	1–0	0–0	4–1	0–1	1–0	3–0	3–0	2–0	0–0	1–1	3–2
Doncaster Rovers	2–1	2–2		5–4	1–2	0–1	0–1	0–1	3–1	1–1	1–0	0–1	0–1	2–1	2–2	1–1	0–1	0–0	2–1	4–1	0–1	0–2
Dover Athletic	1–1	0–0	1–0		2–1	1–1	0–0	0–0	3–1	0–1	0–1	5–1	2–1	2–3	0–0	1–1	2–1	1–1	1–1	1–2	3–2	1–2
Farnborough Town	2–2	2–4	1–0	1–2		2–2	1–5	0–1	0–4	1–3	2–4	4–2	2–1	1–6	1–6	1–2	1–1	1–0	3–1	1–1	2–1	0–0
Forest Green Rovers	1–1	1–2	0–0	0–1	0–0		1–2	1–0	2–1	1–0	5–0	1–0	3–1	2–2	3–1	0–2	1–0	1–2	1–1	3–2	0–2	1–2
Hayes	1–0	3–2	2–0	1–2	1–0	0–3		1–0	1–2	0–2	2–1	3–0	2–0	1–2	1–0	2–1	3–0	2–2	4–3	1–2	2–2	1–1
Hednesford Town	1–0	3–2	1–1	1–2	0–0	1–1	0–0		3–1	0–2	2–1	1–2	1–1	1–0	1–0	1–1	3–1	2–2	1–1	3–2	2–1	2–3
Hereford United	3–0	0–2	1–0	2–0	2–0	4–0	0–1	0–0		0–2	1–3	2–0	1–0	2–0	2–2	3–2	2–2	0–1	0–0	0–0	0–1	0–1
Kettering Town	2–0	0–2	0–1	0–2	4–1	2–1	1–0	1–0	1–1		1–1	2–0	2–1	6–0	0–0	0–0	1–0	1–2	2–1	1–1	3–0	1–2
Kidderminster Harriers	1–2	0–1	3–3	1–0	2–0	2–2	0–1	1–2	1–0	1–1		0–1	1–2	5–2	4–0	0–0	2–1	2–0	3–0	0–1	3–2	0–1
Kingstonian	5–1	1–2	2–1	1–0	1–1	0–1	1–1	1–1	2–0	1–2	1–0		3–0	0–0	1–1	1–5	0–2	1–0	1–0	2–1	0–0	0–0
Leek Town	3–1	0–2	1–1	2–0	4–0	0–2	1–4	1–3	3–2	1–2	1–4	2–2		7–0	0–3	2–3	0–0	1–1	1–1	2–4	0–3	2–4
Morecambe	3–2	0–2	1–2	0–4	1–0	3–1	2–3	3–1	1–0	3–1	2–1	0–0	2–2		3–1	2–3	1–1	1–1	0–1	2–1	0–1	1–1
Northwich Victoria	1–0	1–0	1–3	2–0	3–0	1–0	2–1	1–1	1–0	4–0	1–0	2–3	0–2	1–1		2–1	1–2	0–1	1–1	3–0	0–3	1–2
Rushden & Diamonds	4–0	1–2	1–3	2–2	1–0	4–0	5–0	1–0	1–1	1–2	1–1	0–0	2–0	3–1	1–2		3–1	2–1	2–3	3–1	2–0	1–2
Southport	0–4	0–2	3–2	3–0	2–2	1–1	1–2	1–1	0–0	0–1	1–1	1–1	3–1	1–0	2–2	0–1		1–1	2–1	5–2	0–0	2–3
Stevenage Borough	1–2	2–2	2–0	1–0	3–1	1–1	2–1	3–1	0–3	2–2	3–0	3–3	2–0	2–0	1–3	0–0	0–0		2–2	1–1	5–0	1–1
Telford United	1–1	0–3	0–2	1–1	3–1	2–1	2–0	1–1	0–1	0–2	0–0	1–1	2–0	2–3	3–0	2–2	1–0	0–3		0–0	1–0	2–2
Welling United	1–1	2–1	1–1	0–3	0–0	0–2	0–2	1–1	2–2	0–2	0–0	1–3	1–0	3–2	2–3	0–1	2–1	1–1	0–1		0–1	1–2
Woking	2–3	1–0	2–0	1–2	4–0	1–1	2–0	2–1	0–1	0–0	2–1	0–1	1–0	0–3	2–1	1–1	2–3	1–2	3–0	0–0		0–0
Yeovil Town	1–0	2–2	2–2	1–1	6–3	0–4	1–1	1–2	3–0	2–1	3–1	1–3	2–0	0–1	1–2	0–1	3–1	1–3	4–0	1–3	0–1	

Updated to match(es) played on unknown. Source:
Legend: Blue = home team win; Yellow = draw; Red = away team win.

== Top scorers in order of league goals ==
Rank	Player	Club	League	FA Cup	FA Trophy	League Cup	Total
1	(England) Carl Alford	Stevenage Borough	26	4	3	0	33
2	(England) Warren Patmore	Yeovil Town	20	4	2	0	26
3	(England) John Norman	Morecambe	19	2	0	2	23
4	(England) Lee Charles	Hayes	18	0	2	1	21
=	(England) Neil Grayson	Cheltenham Town	18	0	5	0	23
=	(England) Hugh McAuley	Leek Town	18	0	0	1	19
7	(England) Darren Collins	Rushden & Diamonds	17	2	0	0	19
8	(England) Dennis Bailey	Cheltenham Town	15	1	1	6	23
=	(England) Adrian Foster	Rushden & Diamonds	15	0	0	1	16
=	(England) Paul Tait	Northwich Victoria	15	0	0	1	16
11	(England) Darran Hay	Woking	13	5	5	0	23
=	(England) Mark Hynes	Dover Athletic	13	4	1	0	18
=	(England) Adie Mike	Hednesford	13	3	0	0	16
14	(England) Ian Duerden	Doncaster Rovers	12	2	0	4	18
=	(England) Marc McGregor	Forest Green Rovers	12	0	3	0	15
=	(England) Brett McNamara	Kettering Town	12	0	2	0	14
=	(England) Steve West	Woking	12	0	1	0	13
18	(England) Scott Huckerby	Telford United	11	3	2	0	16
=	(England) Leroy May	Kidderminster Harriers	11	0	0	1	12
20	(England) Lee Hudson	Kettering Town	10	0	1	0	12
=	(England) Neil Illman	Northwich Victoria	10	0	1	1	12
=	(England) Richard Leadbeater	Stevenage Borough	10	0	0	0	10
=	(England) David Leworthy	Kingstonian	10	2	5	0	17
=	(England) Owen Pickard	Yeovil Town	10	0	2	0	12

- Footballtransfers.co.uk, thefootballarchives.com and Soccerbase contain information on many players
  on whom there is not yet an article in Wikipedia.
