= Valid orders =

Valid orders may refer to:

- Holy orders that are valid, referring to the sacrament or rite given to initiate clergy in some churches
  - Validity and liceity of holy orders in the Catholic Church
  - Valid but irregular, a concept in other Christian churches
- Superior orders, a legal defense
