= Douglas Bartles-Smith =

British Anglican priest (1937–2014)

Douglas Leslie Bartles-Smith (3 June 1937 – 6 June 2014) was an English Anglican priest: he was the Archdeacon of Southwark from 1985 to 2004.

== Biography ==
Douglas Bartles-Smith was son of Leslie Charles and Muriel Rose Bartles-Smith. He was educated at Shrewsbury School and St Edmund Hall, Oxford.

After National Service as a Second Lieutenant with the Royal Army Service Corps he was ordained in 1963. Following a curacy at St Stephen's, Rochester Row he was Curate in charge of St Michael and All Angels with Emmanuel and All Souls, Camberwell from 1968 to 1972 then its Vicar until 1975. He had a further incumbency at St Luke, Battersea for a decade before his Archdeacon’s appointment. He was also honorary Chaplain to the Queen from 1996 to 2007. He was an honorary freeman of the London Borough of Southwark in 2004.

After retiring from full-time ministry, Bartles-Smith returned to live in Shrewsbury. He was a writer of several books, the last of which was A Royal Church in Shrewsbury: A History of St Mary's Church which was posthumously published over six months after his death in 2014. His father had been a Churchwarden at that church where the family worshipped. With David Gerrard, he had co-authored Urban Ghetto (published 1976), on subject of mission in urban areas, published Opportunities for a Strong Church in 1993, and in 2007 Fighting Fundamentalism: a spiritual autobiography.

Bartles-Smith died on 6 June 2014, at the age of 77. having been ill with stomach cancer,

Church of England titles
Preceded by Wilfred Denniston Wood	Archdeacon of Southwark; 1985–2004	Succeeded by Michael Geoffrey Ipgrave
