= Jonathan Gledhill =

English Anglican clergyman (1949–2021)

The Right Reverend Jonathan Gledhill
- Bishop of Lichfield
- Church: Church of England
- Diocese: Diocese of Lichfield
- In office: 2003–2015
- Predecessor: Keith Sutton
- Successor: Michael Ipgrave
- Other post: Bishop of Southampton (1996–2003)

Orders
- Ordination: 1975
- Consecration: 1996

Personal details
- Born: 14 February 1949 Windsor, Berkshire, England
- Died: 1 November 2021 (aged 72)
- Denomination: Anglican
- Spouse: Jane Gledhill
- Children: 2
- Education: Keele University; University of Bristol; Trinity College, Bristol

Member of the House of Lords
- Lord Spiritual
- Bishop of Lichfield; 3 November 2009 – 30 September 2015

Jonathan Michael Gledhill (14 February 1949 – 1 November 2021) was an English Anglican clergyman. He was the Bishop of Southampton from 1996 to 2003, and the 98th Bishop of Lichfield from 2003 to 2015.

== Early life ==
Gledhill was born on 14 February 1949, in Windsor, Berkshire, England. He was educated at Keele University and the University of Bristol. He trained for the ministry at Trinity College, Bristol. In 2007 he was awarded an honorary doctorate by Keele University in recognition of his "outstanding contribution to the Church and to the people and the County of Staffordshire."

== Ordained ministry ==
Gledhill was curate at All Saints', Marple, (Diocese of Chester) from 1975 to 1978 and from 1978 to 1983 was priest in charge of St George's Folkestone. From 1983 to 1996 he was Vicar at St Mary Bredin, Canterbury and a tutor at the Canterbury School of Ministry. From 1988 to 1994 he was also the Rural Dean at Canterbury and from 1992 to 1996 an honorary canon of Canterbury Cathedral.

From 1995 to 1998, Gledhill was a member of the General Synod. From 1996 to 2003 he was the suffragan Bishop of Southampton. From 1997 he chaired the Anglican-Old Catholic International Co-ordinating Council and was chairman of the Governing Body of the National College of Evangelists.

Gledhill was the 98th Bishop of Lichfield. He was enthroned in Lichfield Cathedral on 15 November 2003 and he retired on 30 September 2015. Following his retirement he moved back to Canterbury where he lived and had permission to officiate in its Diocese.

Gledhill published Leading a Local Church in the Age of the Spirit.

== Personal life ==
Gledhill's wife was a university lecturer and lay reader; they had one daughter and one son. He also had grandchildren.

He announced he had Parkinson's disease, shortly before his retirement from ministry in 2015. Gledhill died on 1 November 2021, at the age of 72.

== Styles ==
- The Reverend Jonathan Gledhill (1975–1992)
- The Reverend Canon Jonathan Gledhill (1992–1996)
- The Right Reverend Jonathan Gledhill (1996–2021)

Church of England titles
Preceded by John Perry	Bishop of Southampton; 1996–2003	Succeeded by Paul Butler
Preceded by Keith Sutton	Bishop of Lichfield; 2003–2015	Succeeded by Michael Ipgrave
