= Moorfields, Bristol =

Coordinates: 51.459°N 2.560°W

Moorfields
- Location within Bristol
- Unitary authority: Bristol
- Region: South West
- Country: England
- Sovereign state: United Kingdom
- Post town: BRISTOL
- Postcode district: BS5
- Dialling code: 0117
- Police: Avon and Somerset
- Fire: Avon
- Ambulance: South Western
- UK Parliament: Bristol West

Moorfields is an area of Bristol, England. It lies in the east of the city, east of Barton Hill, south of Easton and west of Redfield. The name is no longer in common use, and the area is now generally considered parts of Easton and Redfield.

Moorfields derives its name from a wealthy Bristol fishmonger named Samuel Moore, who invested in land in the area at the beginning of the 19th century. He built 40 cottages and an imposing residence (Moore's Lodge) around a square called Moorfields Square south of Church Road (then known as Redfield Road). The Lodge was demolished in the early 1900s. The cottages were demolished in 1930. Further development followed in the 1870s, when hundreds of terraced houses were built north of Church Road around Russell Town Avenue (then known as Dean Lane). This working class area survived as a distinct community until it was redeveloped in the 1950s and 1960s. The City Academy Bristol now occupies much of the site.

In 1873 the growing population led to the formation of a new ecclesiastical parish of Moorfields from parts of the parishes of St George and Easton. The parish church of St Matthew, Moorfields was constructed in Gothic style at the corner of Church Road and Cowper Street. The church was closed in 1999, and has now been converted into apartments and offices. Moorfields now forms part of the parish of St Luke, Barton Hill with Christ Church and St Matthew, Moorfields.
