= Phonotrope =

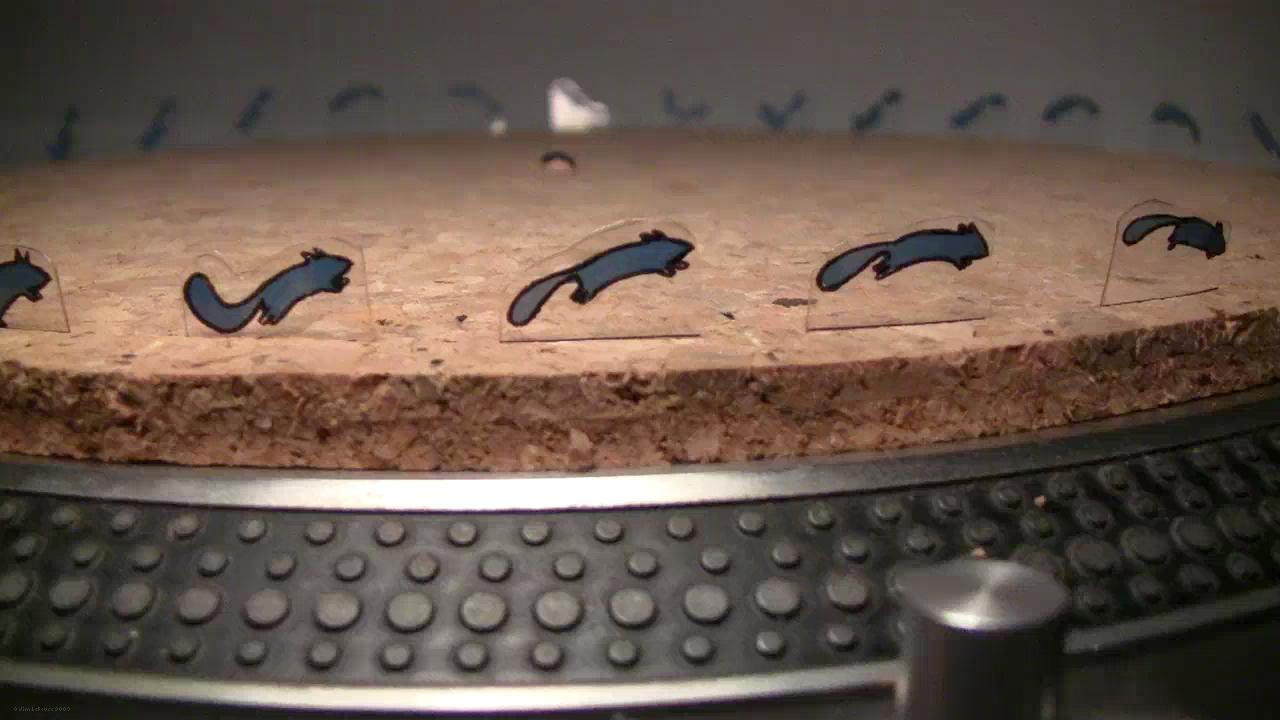
Still of the Phonotrope 'Squirrels' made by Jim Le Fevre in 2009

The Phonotrope is the term coined by animation director Jim Le Fevre to describe the technique of creating animation in a 'live' environment using the confluence of the frame rate of a live action camera and the revolutions of a constantly rotating disc, predominantly (but not exclusively) using a record player.

It is a contemporary reworking of the phenakistiscope, one of several pre-film animation devices that produce the illusion of motion by displaying a sequence of pictures showing progressive phases of that motion.

The crucial difference between the technique that the Phonotrope uses and the one a phenakistiscope uses is that the Phonotrope is specifically an in-camera technique using the frame-rate of a live-action camera set to a high shutter speed in confluence with a constantly rotating disc to create the illusion of movement. In a phenakistiscope it is the vertical slits in the circumference of the disc that create the stroboscopic interruptions needed for animation. As such the Phonotrope can only be seen through either the camera's viewfinder, a connected monitor or projector or viewed as footage after the event. Timed flashes of a strobe light can also animate the imagery.

From its inception the most commonly used methods of rotating the disc have been using a record-player. However, Le Fevre has also used a pottery wheel to spin a glazed pot to create animation as well as a bespoke motor to animate hundreds of cut-out card images on a two-meter-high (6.6 ft) wooden tiered structure for the title sequence for the BBC television comedy film Holy Flying Circus.

== Public appearances ==
The earliest public showing of the Phonotrope was in March 2007 at an evening at the Victoria and Albert Museum where Jim Le Fevre presented the process to members of the public as part of a 'Friday Late' event. Footage from the event was posted on YouTube in 2008.

In 2008 Le Fevre gave a talk at "Interesting 2008", a series of time-restricted lectures in Holborn, London, organised by Russell Davies

In 2009 Le Fevre gave a talk on the Phonotrope at the Flatpack Film Festival and in 2010 Le Fevre performed an evening at the ICA with music DJ Malcolm Goldie for the ICA's Heavy Pencil night.

Since 2010 Le Fevre has performed workshops and talks on the Phonotrope nationally and internationally.

== Naming ==
The term Phonotrope was coined in 2010 by Jim Le Fevre. He previously termed his version of the technique the Phonographanstasmascope as a nod to the convoluted names of its ancestors, like the phonograph, the phenakistiscope (originally dubbed phantasmascope by inventor Joseph Plateau), the zoetrope, the praxinoscope and the zoopraxiscope, but realised it was too cumbersome to use.

== In advertising and broadcast ==
In 2007 Jim Le Fevre used the Phonotropic technique to create an onscreen ident for MTV called "MTV - Turntable" and in 2010 he created a 2-meter-tall (6.6 ft) Terry Gilliam inspired Phonotrope for the title sequence for the BBC television comedy film Holy Flying Circus. In 2013 Le Fevre (with Rupert and Alice Johnstone from RAMP ceramics) created a Phonotropic film using a pottery wheel for the Crafts Council of England.

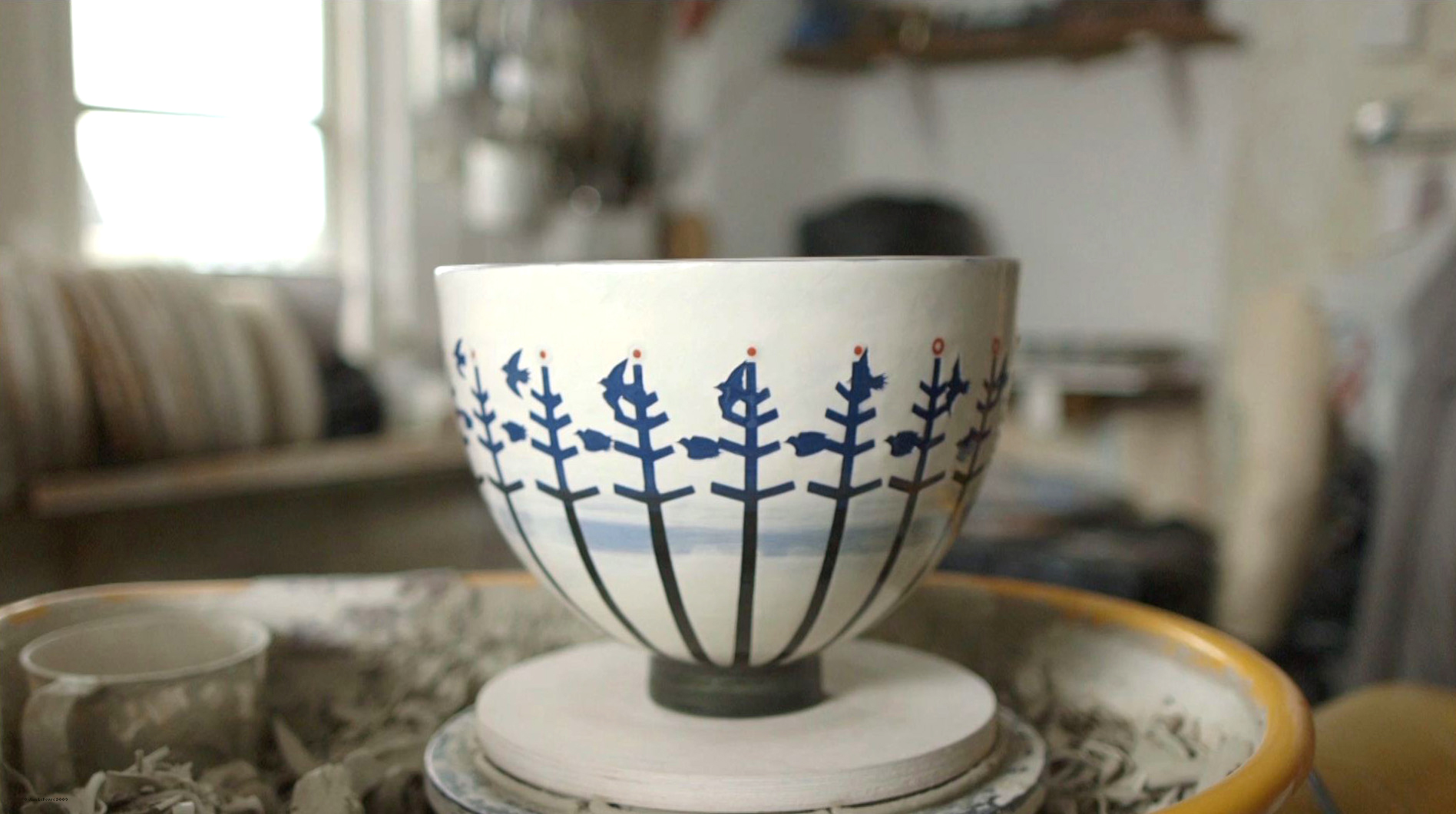
Pot created by RAMP Ceramics and Jim Le Fevre. Still taken from camera work by Mike Paterson/Pfilms
