= Mervyn Stockwood =

British Anglican bishop (1913–1995)

The Right Reverend Mervyn Stockwood
- Bishop of Southwark
- Stockwood on Friday Night, Saturday Morning (1979)
- Diocese: Southwark
- In office: 1959–1980
- Predecessor: Bertram Simpson
- Successor: Ronald Bowlby
- Other post: Honorary assistant bishop in Bath & Wells

Orders
- Ordination: 1936 (deacon); 1937 (priest)
- Consecration: 1959

Personal details
- Born: 27 May 1913 Bridgend, Glamorgan, Wales
- Died: 13 January 1995 (aged 81) Bath, Somerset, England
- Denomination: Church of England
- Parents: Arthur and Beatrice Stockwood
- Profession: Bishop, writer
- Education: Christ's College, Cambridge

Arthur Mervyn Stockwood (27 May 1913 – 13 January 1995) was a Church of England bishop who served as vicar of St Matthew's Church, Moorfields, then of Great St Mary's, Cambridge, and finally as Bishop of Southwark, retiring in 1980.

== Early life ==
Mervyn Stockwood was born in Bridgend, Wales. In 1916, during the First World War, his solicitor father was killed in the Battle of the Somme. He was introduced to Anglo-Catholic worship at All Saints' Church, Clifton, which reinforced his love of ritual and sense of the dramatic. He was educated at the Downs School and Kelly College in Tavistock, Devon; in 1931 he entered Christ's College, Cambridge, and graduated in 1934.

A flamboyant figure, he was for a time a Labour councillor in Bristol and later Cambridge, having developed socialist ideas while at theological college.

== Ordained ministry ==
Having studied for the Anglican ministry at Westcott House, a theological college in Cambridge, Stockwood was ordained deacon in 1936 and priest in 1937. He was a curate, then the vicar, of St Matthew's Church, Moorfields, Bristol, for nineteen years. He was also missioner to Blundell's School in Tiverton, Devon. In 1955 he was appointed vicar of Great St Mary's, Cambridge, where his preaching drew large congregations of undergraduates, gaining him a national reputation.

=== Bishop of Southwark ===
In 1959, at the suggestion of the Archbishop of Canterbury, Geoffrey Fisher, the British prime minister, Harold Macmillan, appointed Stockwood to the Diocese of Southwark. Under him, Southwark became one of the best known dioceses in the Church of England. Stockwood encouraged both the radical and conservative wings of the church. On the one hand he encouraged priests wearing jeans in public, marches against racism and the training of worker priests in the Southwark Ordination Course, yet he was also the first Church of England diocesan bishop to preach at the National Pilgrimage to the Anglican Shrine of Our Lady of Walsingham, of which he later became an honorary guardian. Stockwood however did not hesitate to send the police to close an Anglo-Catholic church in Carshalton. Under his diocesan chancellor, Garth Moore, a number of trials of clergy followed, usually followed by a service of deposition from their holy orders in the cathedral.

During the 1960s the term "South Bank religion" was connected with Stockwood's diocese and those in his circle espousing a more liberal theology. He was liberal in his view of the morality of homosexual relationships, favoured homosexual law reform and included homosexual couples among the guests at his dinner parties. On at least one occasion he blessed a homosexual relationship, but Stockwood himself said he was celibate. He somewhat incongruously, however, in his Sermons from Great St. Mary's, preached in Cambridge, did not hesitate to cast a slur on the characters of kings James I and Richard II whom he associated with this tendency.

Stockwood was adept at making unusual and radical, but usually highly successful, appointments. John Robinson was appointed as his suffragan at Woolwich in 1959. Later Stockwood chose David Sheppard as Bishop of Woolwich in 1969 (after John Robinson's return to Cambridge), Hugh Montefiore as Bishop of Kingston in 1970, Michael Marshall to Woolwich in 1975 and Keith Sutton to Kingston in 1978.

In 1964 Stockwood joined the Who Killed Kennedy? Committee set up by Bertrand Russell.

Stockwood appeared on the BBC chat show Friday Night, Saturday Morning on 9 November 1979, with Christian writer and broadcaster Malcolm Muggeridge, arguing that the film Monty Python's Life of Brian was blasphemous. He told John Cleese and Michael Palin at the end of the discussion that they would "get [their] thirty pieces of silver".

== Later life and legacy ==
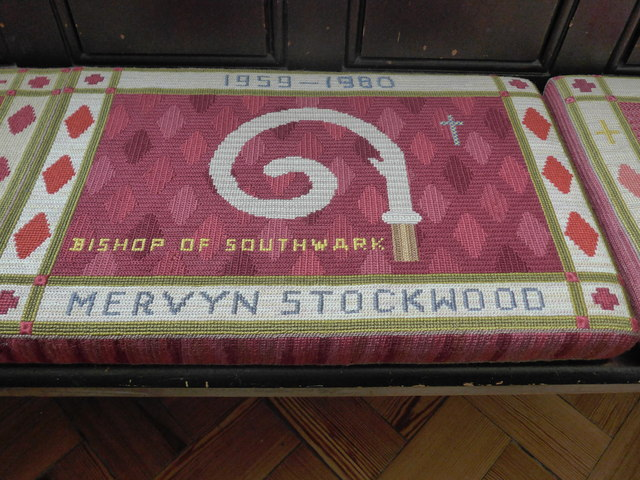
Pew cushion in St Anne's Church, Kew, one of the churches in the Diocese of Southwark, dedicated to Mervyn Stockwood

In 1980 Stockwood retired and went to live in Bath. In his autobiography, Chanctonbury Ring, Stockwood claimed to have had numerous paranormal experiences. A supporter of the Churches' Fellowship for Psychical and Spiritual Study, he said of the matter, "Our job is to examine the evidence without presupposition or jumping to conclusions. The weakness of the Church has been its refusal to consider the evidence and discuss it."

Shortly before his death he was one of ten Church of England bishops "outed" (i.e. alleged to be a closet homosexual) by the radical gay organisation OutRage!. Michael De-la-Noy's biography, Mervyn Stockwood: A Lonely Life (September 1997), paints him as a socialist who loved the trappings of wealth, privilege and royalty.

== Publications ==
- Chanctonbury Ring: An Autobiography. Hodder and Stoughton. 1982. ISBN 978-0-340-27568-9.

Religious titles
Preceded by Bertram Simpson	Bishop of Southwark; 1959–1980	Succeeded by Ronnie Bowlby
