= Ronald Bowlby =

British Anglican bishop (1926–2019)

The Right Reverend Ronald Bowlby
- Bishop of Southwark
- Church: Church of England
- Diocese: Southwark
- In office: 14 December 1980–1991
- Predecessor: Mervyn Stockwood
- Successor: Roy Williamson
- Other posts: Bishop of Newcastle; 1972–1980; Honorary assistant bishop in Worcester (1991–2019)

Orders
- Consecration: 6 January 1973

Personal details
- Born: 16 August 1926
- Died: 21 December 2019 (aged 93)
- Denomination: Anglican
- Education: Trinity College, Oxford

Ronald Oliver Bowlby (16 August 1926 – 21 December 2019), also known as Ronnie Bowlby, was a British Anglican bishop. He was the ninth Bishop of Newcastle from 1973 until 1980. He was then translated to Southwark where he served until his retirement eleven years later in 1991. He was "a leading advocate for the ordination of women".

== Early life and education ==
Bowlby was born on 16 August 1926. He was educated at Eton College and Trinity College, Oxford.

== Ordained ministry ==
Bowlby's first post after ordination was as a curate at St Luke's, Pallion, Sunderland 1952–1956. He was then priest in charge of St Aidan's, Billingham (1956-1966) and Vicar of Croydon (1966-1972) before his ordination to the episcopate.

Bowlby was nominated to Newcastle on 27 November 1972 and consecrated 6 January 1973. He was translated to Southwark on 14 December 1980.

He retired in August 1991. He remained an honorary fellow at Trinity College, Oxford.

His interest was in housing matters and he served as president of the National Federation of Housing Associations from 1984 to 1988 and of the Churches' National Housing Coalition from 1991 to 1994.

== Personal life ==
In 1956 he married Elizabeth Trevelyan Monro. The couple had three sons and two daughters.

=== Death ===
After his retirement from his last bishopric he lived in Shrewsbury, Shropshire, dying in December 2019 at the age of 93.
