= Bertram Simpson (bishop) =

Bertram Fitzgerald Simpson (25 September 1883 - 16 July 1971) was a prominent Anglican cleric who served over half a century in London as Suffragan Bishop of Kensington (1932 to 1942) and later as Diocesan Bishop of Southwark (1942 to 1959).

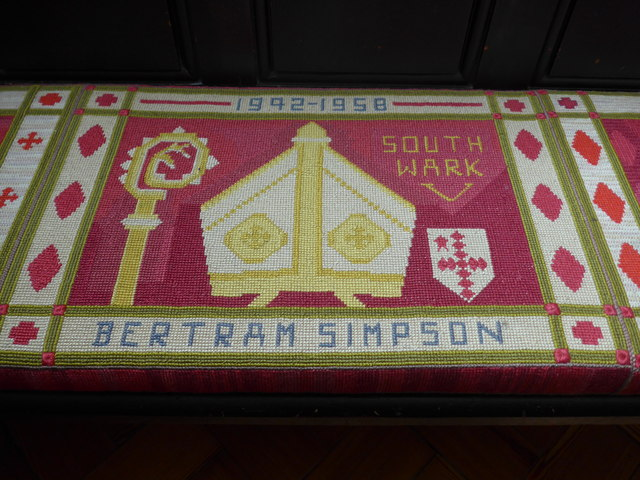
Pew cushion at St Anne's Church, Kew, one of the churches in the Diocese, dedicated to Bertram Simpson

Born on 25 September 1883, Simpson was educated at the University of Durham, where he was President of the Durham Union during Epiphany term of 1906. Ordained in 1908 his first post was at St Anne's, Soho, London. He was Vicar of St Peter's, Harrow, when he was interviewed for a commission as a Temporary Chaplain to the Forces during the First World War. He joined the Chaplaincy on 19 August 1916 and two years later was awarded the Military Cross, in the words of the citation:

For conspicuous gallantry and devotion to duty. Whilst visiting the most advanced line he was injured by the burst of a shell but carried on with his duty. He has always carried out his daily task regardless of all fire.

He suffered shell concussion in this action which left him with tinnitus and he returned to London as a Chaplain in Camberwell hospital He was demobilised in December 1918. He was Rector and Rural Dean of Stepney, 1920–26, and Vicar of St Peter's, Cranley Gardens before his elevation to the episcopate as suffragan Bishop of Kensington He was consecrated a bishop on the Nativity of St John the Baptist (24 June) 1932, at St Paul's Cathedral, by Cosmo Lang, Archbishop of Canterbury.

In 1941, his appointment as diocesan Bishop of Southwark was announced — although the Archbishop of Canterbury regarded him as 'a little rough in manner but otherwise good; Simpson's translation to Southwark duly occurred early in 1942 and he was installed at Southwark Cathedral on 24 January. In 1946, he was offered translation to the more prestigious see of Salisbury but he preferred to remain in the capital He retired in 1958.

His reputation as a spellbinding preacher, apparently extempore but meticulously well-researched, was matched by his humility. He was noted for assisting with the washing-up after church functions and, in an address to a high-powered gathering of the British and Foreign Bible Society, he confessed that he did not read the Bible but 'a thriller for 10 minutes before I go to sleep' He died in 1971 aged 87.

Church of England titles
Preceded by John Maud	Bishop of Kensington; 1932–1942	Succeeded by Henry Montgomery Campbell
Preceded by Richard Parsons	Bishop of Southwark; 1942–1959	Succeeded by Mervyn Stockwood
