= Michael Ipgrave =

British Anglican bishop and Lord Spiritual (born 1958)

The Right Reverend Dr Michael Ipgrave OBE
- Bishop of Lichfield
- Church: Church of England
- Diocese: Diocese of Lichfield
- In office: 2016–2026
- Predecessor: Jonathan Gledhill
- Other posts: Archdeacon of Southwark (2004–2012) area Bishop of Woolwich (Southwark; 2012–2016)

Orders
- Ordination: 1982 (deacon); 1983 (priest) by Douglas Feaver
- Consecration: 21 March 2012 by Rowan Williams

Personal details
- Born: Michael Geoffrey Ipgrave; 18 April 1958 (age 68) Northampton, Northamptonshire, United Kingdom
- Denomination: Anglican
- Residence: Bishop's House, Lichfield
- Spouse: Julia Bailey (m. 1981)
- Children: Three
- Education: Magdalen College School, Brackley
- Alma mater: Oriel College, Oxford; Ripon College Cuddesdon; Durham University

Member of the House of Lords
- Lord Spiritual
- Bishop of Lichfield; 20 February 2023

Michael Geoffrey Ipgrave OBE (born 18 April 1958) is a British Anglican bishop. Since 2016, he has been the 99th Bishop of Lichfield, the diocesan bishop of the Diocese of Lichfield. He was the Bishop of Woolwich, an area bishop in the Diocese of Southwark, from 2012 to 2016. He served as Archdeacon of Southwark between 2004 and 2012.

== Early life and education ==
Ipgrave was born on 18 April 1958 in Northampton, Northamptonshire, United Kingdom. He was educated at Magdalen College School, Brackley, a state school in South Northamptonshire. In January 1975, aged 16, he captained his school team of Top of The Form, on the radio, reaching the final, but lost to Cheltenham Grammar School. Also in the team was Marni Burfitt, aged 15, Alison de Verteuil, aged 13, and David Seaman, aged 12, being coached by teachers Clive Waind and Rosemary Davies.

From 1975 to 1978, he studied mathematics at Oriel College, Oxford, and graduated from the University of Oxford with a first class Bachelor of Arts (BA) degree.

From 1979 to 1980, he attended the Spring Hill Ordination Scheme in Birmingham. From 1979 to 1982, he trained for ordination at Ripon College Cuddesdon, an Anglican theological college near Oxford. During that period he also studied theology at the University of Oxford, and graduated with an additional first class BA. In 1999 Ipgrave completed a doctorate at Durham University with a thesis entitled Trinity and inter-faith dialogue: plenitude and plurality.

== Ordained ministry ==
Ipgrave was ordained in the Church of England: made a deacon at Petertide 1982 (27 June) and ordained a priest in the Petertide following (26 June 1983) — both times by Douglas Feaver, Bishop of Peterborough, at Peterborough Cathedral. After a curacy in Oakham followed by time in Japan, he was a team vicar in two separate Leicester parishes.

In Leicester, in 1991, he was appointed diocesan chaplain for relations with people of other faiths, and bishops' domestic chaplain in 1992. He was appointed Archdeacon of Southwark in 2004. In 2010 he also became Canon Missioner of Southwark Cathedral. He was co-chair of Southwark and London Housing Association (now Amicus Horizon)

He was formerly Inter Faith Relations Advisor to the Archbishops' Council and secretary of the Churches' Commission on Inter-Faith Relations.

=== Episcopal ministry ===
On 3 February 2012, Ipgrave was announced as the next Bishop of Woolwich, an area bishop in the Diocese of Southwark. On 21 March 2012, he was consecrated a bishop, by Rowan Williams, Archbishop of Canterbury, during a service in Southwark Cathedral. He also served as Warden of Readers for the diocese. In May 2013, he read bidding prayers at a Mass for Lee Rigby who was murdered by Islamists in the 2013 Woolwich attack.

Since February 2015 Ipgrave has been chair of the Council of Christians and Jews (CCJ). On 2 March 2016, it was announced that he was to become the next diocesan Bishop of Lichfield. His canonical election to that See was confirmed on 10 June 2016; his installation at Lichfield Cathedral took place on 24 September 2016.

He became a member of the House of Lords (as a Lord Spiritual) on 25 October 2022; he was introduced on 20 February 2023. On 25 April 2023, he made his maiden speech in the Lords during a debate on parliamentary democracy in the United Kingdom; he did not speak again until September 2024, but since that time has spoken regularly on topics such as welfare fraud and integration of immigrants.

In March 2026, it was announced that he would retire as Bishop of Lichfield in September 2026.

=== Views ===
In November 2023, he was one of 44 Church of England bishops who signed an open letter supporting the use of the Prayers of Love and Faith (i.e. blessings for same-sex couples) and called for "Guidance being issued without delay that includes the removal of all restrictions on clergy entering same-sex civil marriages, and on bishops ordaining and licensing such clergy".

== Personal life ==
In 1981, Ipgrave married Julia Bailey. Together they have three sons.

== Honours ==
In the 2011 New Year Honours, Ipgrave was appointed an Officer of the Order of the British Empire (OBE) "for services to inter-faith relations in London".

== Selected works ==
He has edited six volumes on Christian and Muslim relations. He is author of Trinity and Inter Faith Dialogue, and has contributed to journal articles and book chapters on inter-faith matters.

- Ipgrave, Michael (1994). Christ in ten thousand places: a Catholic perspective on Christian encounter with other faiths. London: Dartman, Longman and Todd. ISBN 978-0232520798.
- Ipgrave, Michael (2003). Trinity and inter faith dialogue: plenitude and plurality. Bern: Peter Lang. ISBN 978-3906769776.

Church of England titles
Preceded by Douglas Bartles-Smith	Archdeacon of Southwark; 2004–2012	Succeeded by Jane Steen
Preceded by Christopher Chessun	Bishop of Woolwich; 2012–2016	Succeeded by Karowei Dorgu
Preceded by Jonathan Gledhill	Bishop of Lichfield; 2016–present	Incumbent
