= Christopher Chessun =

British Anglican bishop and Lord Spiritual (born 1956)

The Right Reverend Christopher Chessun
- Bishop of Southwark
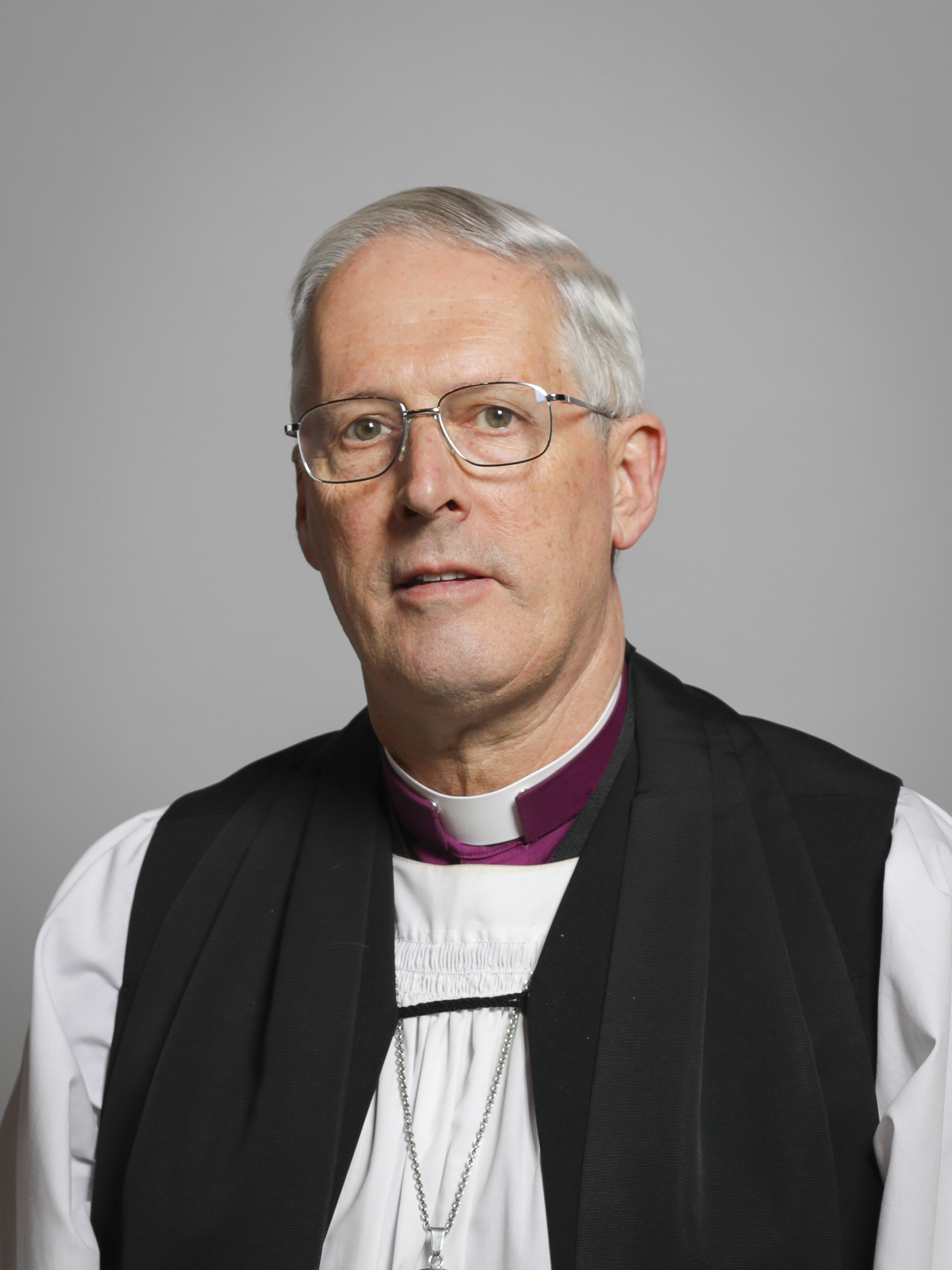
- Official portrait, 2019
- Church: Church of England
- Diocese: Southwark
- In office: 2011–2026
- Predecessor: Tom Butler
- Other posts: Bishop for Urban Life and Faith (2009–present); Area Bishop of Woolwich (2005–2011)

Orders
- Ordination: 3 July 1983 (deacon) by Conrad Meyer; 1 July 1984 (priest) by Patrick Rodger
- Consecration: 21 April 2005 by Rowan Williams

Personal details
- Born: 5 August 1956 (age 70) Hampton, Middlesex, England
- Denomination: Anglican
- Residence: Bishop's House, Streatham
- Education: University College, Oxford

Member of the House of Lords
- Lord Spiritual
- Bishop of Southwark; 15 December 2014 – 4 August 2026

Christopher Thomas James Chessun (born 5 August 1956) is a British retired Anglican bishop. He became Bishop of Southwark in the Church of England in 2011 and served until 2026.

== Early life and education ==
Chessun is a twin and was born on 5 August 1956. He was educated at Hampton School, an all-boys private school in London. He studied modern history at University College, Oxford, graduating with a Bachelor of Arts (BA) degree in 1978: as per tradition, his BA was promoted to a Master of Arts (MA Oxon) degree in 1982. He trained for ordination at Westcott House, Cambridge, a liberal catholic theological college, while also studying theology at Trinity Hall, Cambridge. He graduated from the University of Cambridge with a BA degree in 1982, having completed part II of the Theological Tripos.

== Ordained ministry ==
Made a deacon at Petertide 1983 (3 July) by Conrad Meyer, Bishop of Dorchester, at Dorchester Abbey and ordained a priest the following Petertide (1 July 1984) by Patrick Rodger, Bishop of Oxford, at Christ Church Cathedral, Oxford, he served curacies at St Michael and All Angels Sandhurst and St Mary's Portsea and was then successively a chaplain at St Paul's Cathedral, London, rector of St Dunstan's, Stepney, Archdeacon of Northolt (2001–2005).

=== Episcopal ministry ===
In 2005, he was appointed Bishop of Woolwich, an area bishop of the Diocese of Southwark. He was consecrated a bishop on 21 April 2005. He is a passionate advocate of overseas church links.

Having served as an area bishop for over five years, his appointment as Bishop of Southwark was confirmed before a congregation at St Mary-le-Bow, Cheapside on 17 January 2011. His enthronement at Southwark Cathedral took place on 6 March 2011, and he began public ministry as the 10th Bishop of Southwark.

He is a strong advocate for the parish system as the most effective means of church presence and engagement in the life of local communities. His residence as Bishop of Southwark is Bishop's House, Streatham. Chessun is the lead bishop for Urban Life and Faith for the Church of England, contributing to debates and discussions on the churches' contribution to urban and public policy. In 2012, a number of Evangelical Anglicans criticised him for appointing liberal Anglo-Catholics to his leadership team.

In May 2011, the Church of England declared that three members of the diocese participating in the Anglican Mission in England, ordained in Kenya, were in an impaired state of communion with Chessun due to a conflict of views on homosexuality. These "irregular" clergy would have to seek other bishops to ordain their candidates. His views are similar to those of his predecessor, Tom Butler, who appointed Chessun as Bishop of Woolwich.

In 2022, Chessun was appointed chair of the Nikaean Ecumenical Trust, to finance study trips made by members of Christian Churches, particularly from Eastern and Central Europe.

He retired as Bishop of Southwark in August 2026.

=== Views ===
In November 2023, he was one of 44 Church of England bishops who signed an open letter supporting the use of the Prayers of Love and Faith (i.e. blessings for same-sex couples) and called for "Guidance being issued without delay that includes the removal of all restrictions on clergy entering same-sex civil marriages, and on bishops ordaining and licensing such clergy".

== Health ==
In September 2024 a taxi Chessun was travelling in stopped abruptly, and he hit his face badly, breaking most facial bones. An airbag protected him from even more serious injury to his skull, brain, and neck. He was told by doctors "your face is cornflakes", but after much medical care was able to return to work before Christmas 2024 with his face held together by "pins and plates", fully recovering by July 2025.

== Styles ==
- The Reverend Christopher Chessun (1983–2001)
- The Venerable Christopher Chessun (2001–2005)
- The Right Reverend Christopher Chessun (2005–present)

Church of England titles
Preceded by Colin Buchanan	Bishop of Woolwich; 2005–2011	Succeeded by Michael Ipgrave
Preceded by Tom Butler	Bishop of Southwark; 2011–present	Incumbent
