= Richard Leadbeater =

English footballer

Personal information
- Full name: Richard Paul Leadbeater
- Date of birth: 21 October 1977 (age 49)
- Place of birth: Dudley, England
- Position: Forward

Senior career*
Years	Team	Apps	(Gls)
1996–1998	Wolverhampton Wanderers	1	(0)
1997–1998	→ Hereford United (loan)	5	(7)
1998–1999	Hereford United		
1999–2001	Stevenage Borough	39	(7)
2001	Hednesford Town	5	(0)
2001–2002	Nuneaton Borough	11	(1)
- * Club domestic league appearances and goals

Richard Paul Leadbeater (born 21 October 1977) is an English retired footballer, who played as a forward. He is now an ordained minister in the Church of England.

In September 2024, Leadbeater was appointed Senior Pastor of Dundonald Church, a large Conservative Evangelical church in Raynes Park, South West London.

While playing part-time, Leadbeater began a theology degree at the University of Birmingham. Leadbeater retired from football aged 26 to pursue full-time Christian ministry.
