= Roy Williamson (bishop) =

The Right Reverend Roy Williamson
- Bishop of Southwark
- Diocese: Diocese of Southwark
- In office: 1991–1998
- Predecessor: Ronald Bowlby
- Successor: Tom Butler
- Previous posts: Bishop of Bradford; 1984–1991; Archdeacon of Nottingham; 1978–1984

Orders
- Consecration: c. 1984

Personal details
- Born: 18 December 1932
- Died: 17 September 2019 (aged 86)
- Denomination: Anglican
- Education: Kingston Polytechnic

Robert Kerr Williamson (8 December 1932 – 17 September 2019), known as Roy Williamson, was the seventh Bishop of Bradford from 1984 until 1991, and was then translated to Southwark where he served until his retirement seven years later.

== Early life and education ==
Williamson was born in Belfast and educated at Kingston Polytechnic and Oak Hill Theological College.

== Ordained ministry ==
His first post after ordination was as a curate at Crowborough Parish Church. He then held incumbencies at St Paul, Hyson Green, Nottingham and St Ann with Emmanuel, in the same city followed by Vicar of St Michaels, Bramcote before being appointed Archdeacon of Nottingham in 1978, his last post before elevation to the episcopate.

On 11 February 2017, Williamson was one of fourteen retired bishops to sign an open letter to the then-serving bishops of the Church of England. In an unprecedented move, they expressed their opposition to the House of Bishops' report to General Synod on sexuality, which recommended no change to the Church's canons or practices around sexuality. By 13 February, a serving bishop (Alan Wilson, Bishop of Buckingham) and nine further retired bishops had added their signatures; on 15 February, the report was rejected by synod.

== Personal life ==
He died on 17 September 2019 at the age of 86.
