= Keith Sutton (bishop) =

British bishop

The Right Reverend Keith Sutton
- Bishop of Lichfield
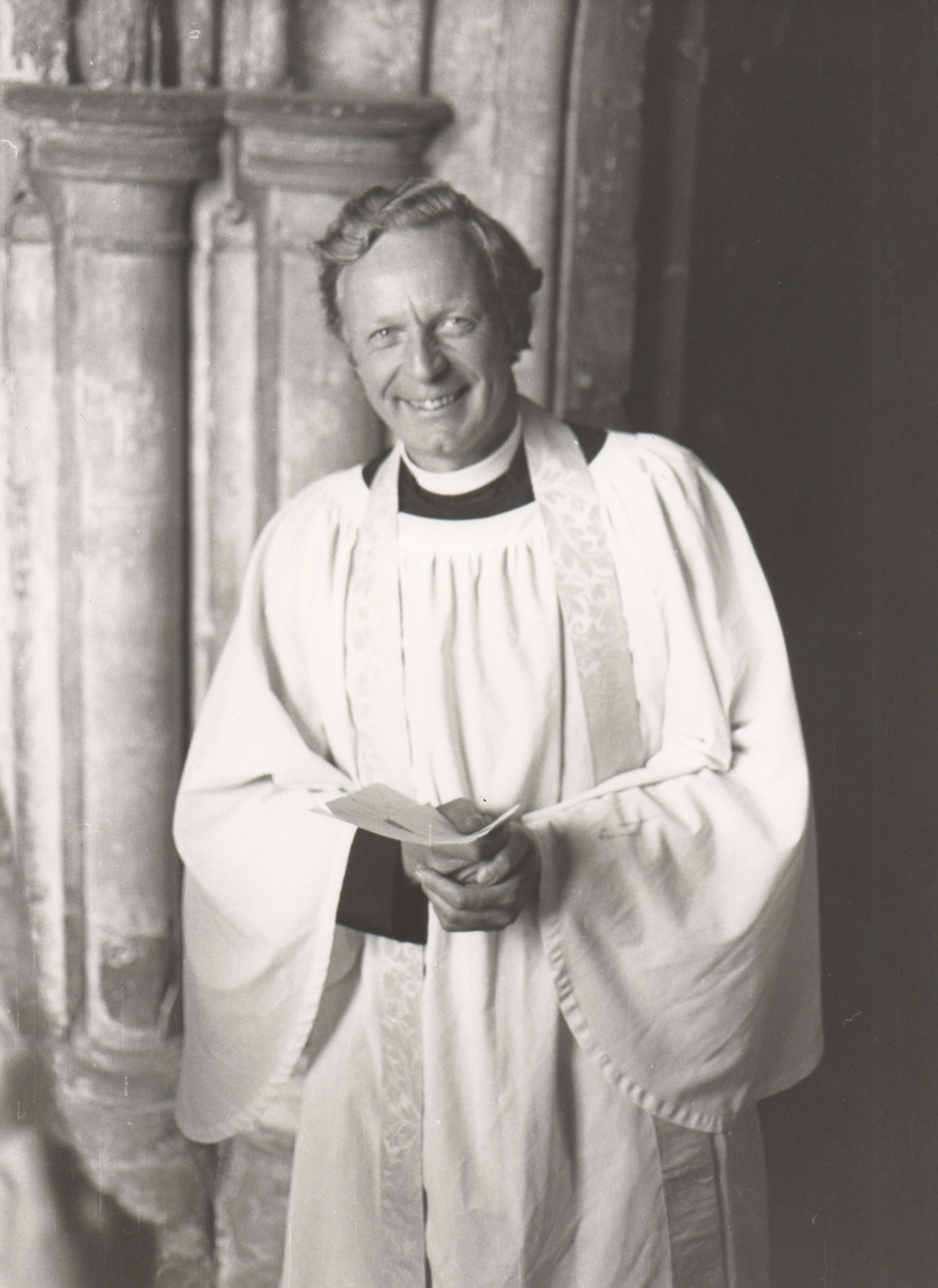
- Sutton in the 1980s
- Church: Church of England
- Diocese: Lichfield
- Installed: 1984
- Term ended: 2003 (retirement)
- Predecessor: Kenneth Skelton
- Successor: Jonathan Gledhill
- Other posts: Bishop of Kingston (1978–1984); Principal of Ridley Hall, Cambridge (1973–1978); Honorary assistant bishop in the Truro and Exeter dioceses (2003–?)

Orders
- Consecration: 29 September 1978

Personal details
- Born: 23 June 1934
- Died: 24 March 2017 (aged 82)
- Denomination: Anglican
- Spouse: Jean Sutton (deceased)
- Children: 4
- Education: Jesus College, Cambridge

Member of the House of Lords
- Lord Spiritual
- Bishop of Lichfield; 1 February 1989 – 13 May 2003

Keith Norman Sutton (23 June 1934 – 24 March 2017) was the 97th Bishop of Lichfield from 1984 to 2003.

== Early life and education ==
Sutton grew up in Balham, London. He attended Battersea Grammar School and won a scholarship to Cambridge University to read English but changed to theology. He graduated from Jesus College, Cambridge, in 1959. He was a keen runner (national schoolboy sprint champion) and was a Cambridge Blue at tennis. Before attending Cambridge University he did his national service with the British Army where he was commissioned into the Sixth Armoured Division and spent time primarily in Germany.

== Ministry ==
Sutton was ordained at Exeter Cathedral and served as a curate in Plymouth. In July 1985, he was sent by the Archbishop of Canterbury as a special envoy to support Archbishop Desmond Tutu who was facing threats of action by the South African government. He was the Bishop of Kingston from 1978 to 1984, having served as principal of Ridley Hall from 1973 to 1978. Prior to his time at Ridley Hall he taught at Bishop Tucker Theological College in Mukono, Uganda, from 1968 to 1973 (now part of Uganda Christian University). He was chaplain of St John's College, Cambridge, from 1962 to 1967. In 1989 he became a member of the General Synod Standing Committee and became president of The Queens College in Birmingham and governor of St John's College, Durham. He wrote a Lent book, The People of God (1983).

Sutton retired to Cornwall and served as an honorary assistant bishop in the dioceses of Truro and Exeter.

== Marriage and family ==
Sutton was married to Jean Sutton (née Geldard), deceased September 2000. They had three sons (Mark, Paul and Andrew) and one daughter (Jacqui).
