= Dundonald Church =

Coordinates: 51.4105°N 0.2220°W

- Dundonald Church, Raynes Park
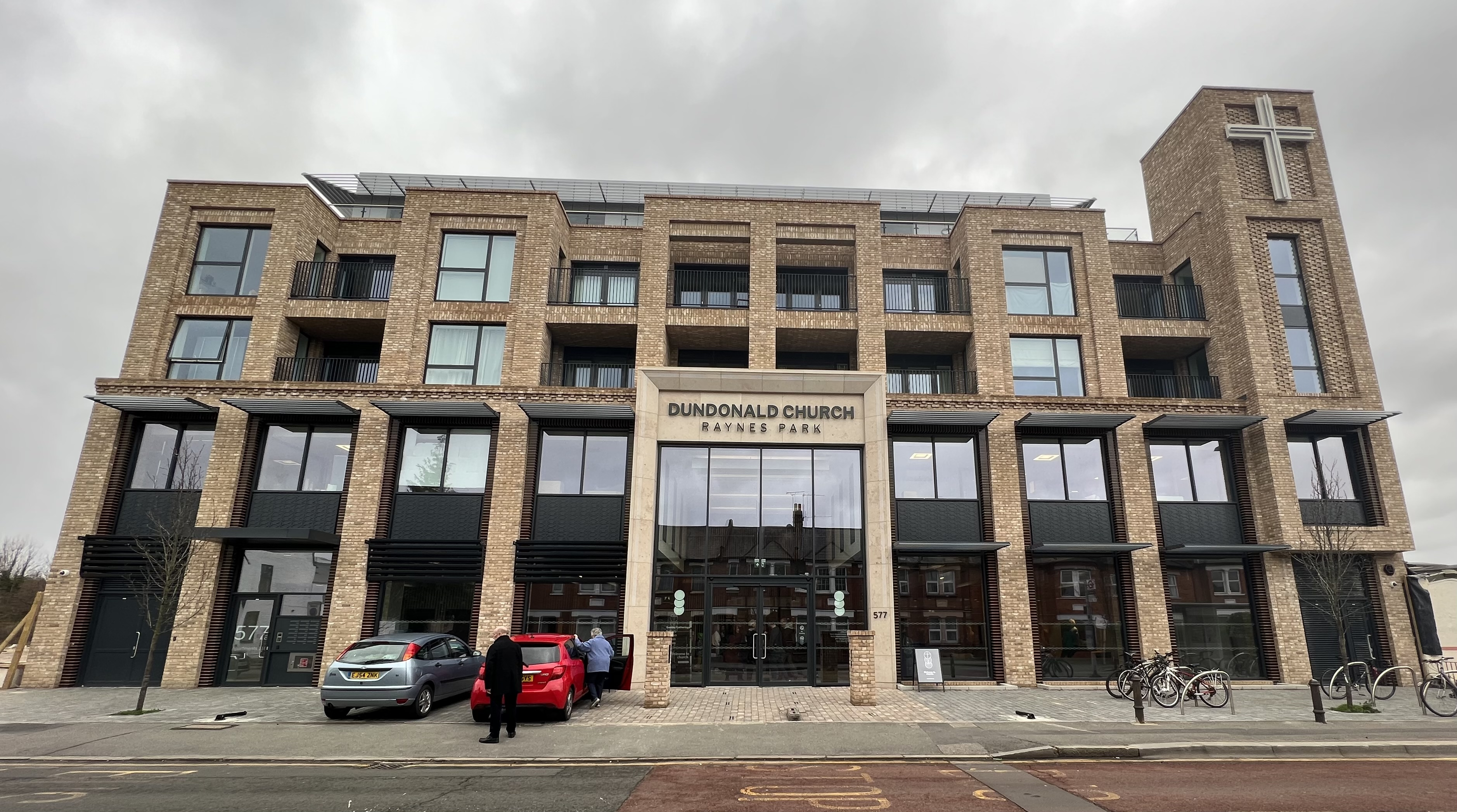
- Dundonald Church in 2022
- Dundonald Church
- Location: Raynes Park, London Borough of Merton
- Country: England
- Denomination: No affiliation to any denomination. Founding church of the Co-Mission network. Previously affiliated to the Church of England.
- Website: dundonald.org

History
- Founded: 1990
- Founder: Co-Mission Initiative

Architecture
- Architect: Brimelow McSweeney
- Years built: 2019–2021

Clergy
- Pastor: Rev'd Richard Leadbeater

Dundonald Church is a conservative evangelical church located in the Wimbledon area of the London Borough of Merton, London. In a new purpose-built building in Raynes Park, Dundonald is committed to preaching the Bible in keeping with the Reformed Evangelical tradition known as Calvinism. Dundonald is a part of the Co-Mission Initiative, a church-planting network in London, which houses its offices in the Church building. Since its founding, Dundonald Church has grown from 30 to around 750 regular adults, as well as 350 under 18s.

The Senior Pastor of Dundonald Church is Richard Leadbeater, taking over from Richard Coekin in September 2024, who had been Senior Pastor for 28 years.

Dundonald Church meets on Sundays, with three gatherings at 10am, 4pm and 6pm, with provision for children aged 0-14 at the 10am and 4pm services.

== History ==
The Church was originally planted as "Emmanuel Dundonald" in 1990 by Emmanuel Church, Wimbledon, and met at Dundonald Primary School in Merton, before moving to its current location in 2008, which was originally the site of a former warehouse. In October 2019, construction began for the new three-story church building, and Dundonald temporarily moved to holding services at Wimbledon Chase Primary School, though, due to the ongoing COVID-19 pandemic, it also hosts services online. Originally expected to be completed in September 2021, the new building opened in February 2022.

The church also runs The Coffee House, a donations-only coffee shop in the foyer of the building, open Monday-Friday.
