= Anglican Bishop of Southwark =

Diocesan bishop in the Church of England

Bishop of Southwark
- Bishopric

anglican
- Incumbent; Vacant

Location
- Ecclesiastical province: Canterbury
- Residence: Bishop's House, Streatham

Information
- Established: 1905
- Diocese: Southwark
- Cathedral: St Saviour and St Mary Overie, Southwark

The Bishop of Southwark (/ˈsʌðərk/ SUDH-ərk) is the ordinary of the Church of England Diocese of Southwark in the Province of Canterbury.

Until 1877, Southwark had been part of the Diocese of Winchester when it was transferred to the Diocese of Rochester. In 1891, the Bishop of Rochester appointed Huyshe Yeatman-Biggs the only suffragan bishop of Southwark and an ancient parish church in Southwark was restored to become a pro-cathedral in 1897, which later became Southwark Cathedral. The bishop's residence is Bishop's House, Streatham.

On 1 May 1905, the Diocese of Southwark was created and covers Greater London south of the River Thames and east Surrey, broadly defined. The Bishop of Southwark is assisted by the suffragan bishops of Croydon, of Kingston and of Woolwich who each oversee an episcopal area of the diocese.

The current and previous bishops have been cited in canonical practice in its interpretation as "valid but irregular" of three ordinations of candidates ordained abroad, associated with a conservative evangelical church-forming group, the Anglican Mission in England, having expressed, in the church's view, extreme views on a complex subject.

The bishopric is currently vacant following the retirement of Christopher Chessun the 10th Bishop of Southwark, in August 2026. He had previously been the area Bishop of Woolwich (2005–2011). When the post-holder ranks among the longest-serving 21 bishops heading a diocese, he or she will qualify for a place in the House of Lords, joining the other five who qualify ex officio, including the two archbishops.

== List of bishops ==
Diocesan Bishops of Southwark
From	Until	Incumbent	Notes
1905	1911	Edward Talbot	Translated from Rochester, translated to Winchester
1911	1919	Hubert Burge	Translated to Oxford
1919	1932	Cyril Garbett	Translated to Winchester, and later to York
1932	1941	Richard Parsons	Translated from Middleton, translated to Hereford
1942	1959	Bertram Simpson	Translated from Kensington
1959	1980	Mervyn Stockwood	
1980	1991	Ronald Bowlby	Translated from Newcastle
1991	1998	Roy Williamson	Translated from Bradford
1998	2010	Tom Butler	Translated from Leicester
2011	2026	Christopher Chessun	Translated from Woolwich
Vacant

== Assistant bishops ==
Among those who have served as assistant bishops in the diocese have been:

- 1964–1968: Gething Caulton, former Bishop of Melanesia and Assistant Bishop of Auckland
- 1968–1972 (d.): John Boys, former Bishop of Kimberley and Kuruman
- 1967 – 1971 (ret.): Lawrence Barham, Minister of Emmanuel Church, Wimbledon and former Bishop of Rwanda and Burundi. Edward Lawrence Barham (25 June 1901 – 5 June 1973) was a missionary in Uganda and Ruanda-Urundi. He was educated at Merchant Taylors' and Gonville and Caius College, Cambridge; and trained for the ministry at Ridley Hall, Cambridge. He was made deacon on Trinity Sunday 1925 (7 June) and ordained priest the following Trinity Sunday (30 May 1926) — both times by Cyril Garbett, Bishop of Southwark, at Southwark Cathedral. After his curacy in Hatcham, County of London (1925–28), he went as a missionary of the Church Mission Society, first to Uganda until 1938, then to Ruanda-Urundi, 1938–57. He was additionally made a Canon of the Diocese of Uganda, 1939; and appointed Archdeacon of Nkore-Kigezi (in the same diocese), 1957–59. Returning to England, he served as General Secretary of the CMS Ruanda Mission until his appointment as Bishop of Rwanda and Burundi in 1964. He was consecrated a bishop on 8 March 1964, by Leslie Brown, Archbishop of Uganda and Bishop of Namirembe, at Namirembe Cathedral; and served until 1966, when he resigned and returned to London in 1966.
- 1974 – 1975: Br John-Charles SSF, former Assistant Bishop of Adelaide and Bishop of Polynesia
- 1975 – 1987 (ret.): Edward Knapp-Fisher, Canon and Archdeacon of Westminster, Sub-Dean of Westminster (from 1982) and former Bishop of Pretoria
