= Canteen Stores Department =

Canteen Stores Department may refer to:

- Canteen Stores Department (Bangladesh)
- Canteen Stores Department (India)
- Canteen Stores Department (Pakistan)
