= CSSD =

CSSD may refer to:

== Groups, organizations ==
- Royal Central School of Speech and Drama, London, England, UK
- Calgary Catholic School District, Alberta, Canada
- Department of Children, Seniors and Social Development (Newfoundland and Labrador), child protection agency in Newfoundland, Canada
- Center for the Study of Social Difference, Columbia Graduate School of Arts and Sciences, The Earth Institute
- Consultative Subcommittee on Surplus Disposal (CSSD), part of the U.N. Food and Agriculture Organization
- Club Atlético Sansinena Social y Deportivo (C. S. S. D.), a soccer club in General Daniel Cerri, Bahía Blanca Partido, Buenos Aires Province, Argentina

=== Political parties ===
- Czech Social Democratic Party (CSSD, Czech: Česká strana sociálně demokratická, ČSSD), a social-democratic political party of Czechia
- Czech Sovereignty of Social Democracy (CSSD, Czech: Česká suverenita sociální demokracie, ČSSD), a left-wing nationalist political party of Czechia
- Czechoslovak Social Democratic Party (CSSD, Českoslovanská sociálně demokratická stranu dělnická, ČSSD), a political party of the former country of Czechoslovakia

=== Unit types ===
- Central sterile services department, an integrated place in health-care facilities that performs sterilization of medical devices
- Combat Service Support Detachment; see Glossary of military abbreviations

== Other uses ==
- Chief of the Security Police and SD (German: Chef der Sicherheitspolizei und des SD; CSSD}; see Glossary of Nazi Germany
- Cloneproof Schwartz Sequential Dropping, a single-winner election method
- Computer Supported Spiritual Development, a field of study related to computer-supported collaboration

== See also ==
- CSD (disambiguation)
