= CSD =

CSD may refer to:

== Finance ==
- Central securities depository
- Confederate States Dollar
- Serbian dinar, by previous ISO 4217 code

== Organizations ==
=== Education ===
- California School for the Deaf (disambiguation), several institutions
- Canyons School District, in Utah, US
- Cheltenham School District, in Pennsylvania, US
- Christina School District, in Delaware, US
- Cleveland School District, in Mississippi, US
- Cordova School District, in Alaska, US

=== Other organizations ===
- Canteen Stores Department (India), a chain of stores operated by the Indian Ministry of Defence at military bases
- CSD Pakistan (Canteen Stores Department), a chain of stores operated by the Pakistani Ministry of Defence
- Chartered Society of Designers, a British learned society for various kinds of design work
- Commission on Sustainable Development (1992–2013), a former UN agency
- Communication Service for the Deaf, an American non-profit company providing ASL services
- Congress of Democratic Trade Unions (Quebec) (French: Centrale des syndicats démocratiques), a labor organization
- Consejo Superior de Deportes (Higher Sports Council), Spain's national sports agency
- Correctional Services Department Hong Kong Correctional Services, prison agency of Hong Kong
- Czechoslovak State Railways (Czech: Československé státní dráhy) (1918–1939, 1945–1992), former state railroad company

== Science and technology ==
=== Biology and medicine ===
- Cat scratch disease, caused by the intracellular bacterium Bartonella henselae
- Chronic subjective dizziness
- Citrus stubborn disease, a plant disease
- Cortical spreading depression
- Communication Sciences and Disorders, a discipline encompassing speech-language pathology, audiology, auditory science, and speech science
- The complementary sex determiner gene, csd, in Hymenoptera

=== Computing and telecommunication ===
- Canonical signed digit, a system for encoding a floating-point value in two's complement representation
- Circuit Switched Data, for mobile phones
- Client-side decoration, a GUI design concept that allows a program's interface to adapt to a user's system
- Corrective Service Diskette, an update for a software program
- Cross Spectral Density, sub-category of spectral density.

=== Other sciences and technologies ===
- Cambridge Structural Database
- Constant speed drive
- Cumulative spectral decay plot, also known as a "waterfall plot"
- Cutter suction dredger, a type of dredger

== Other uses ==
- Cali Swag District, a music group
- Carbonated soft drinks sector of the beverage industry
- Christopher Street Day, an annual European LGBTQ celebration and demonstration
- Cook, Serve, Delicious! and sequels, a series of cooking simulation video games
