= Sparkwell Naval Camp =

The Naval camp in Sparkwell, Plymouth, Devon was set up during the Second World War (1939–1945) in Tin Wood in the small parish of Sparkwell. Sparkwell is a small village just outside Plymouth, in the county of Devon, England.

== Set up ==
In 1942 a rest camp for Naval personnel was set up in Tin Wood, an area of woodland immediately south of the village of Sparkwell, beside the Sparkwell Golf Course. The village was dominated by the camp with their loudspeaker system could be heard echoing through the wood and the village day and night. The Naval camp was commanded by Lieutenant Whitworth and was primarily intended to provide a place of rest and recuperation for the survivors of ships that had been sunk by enemy action. When this rest was over, these men would be sent back to fight again on different ships. The Naval camp consisted of 20 Nissen-type huts for the soldiers' living quarters, a NAAFI (Navy, Army and Air Force Institute) canteen which was also used as a cinema and sometimes a dance hall as well as a sick bay with a morgue.

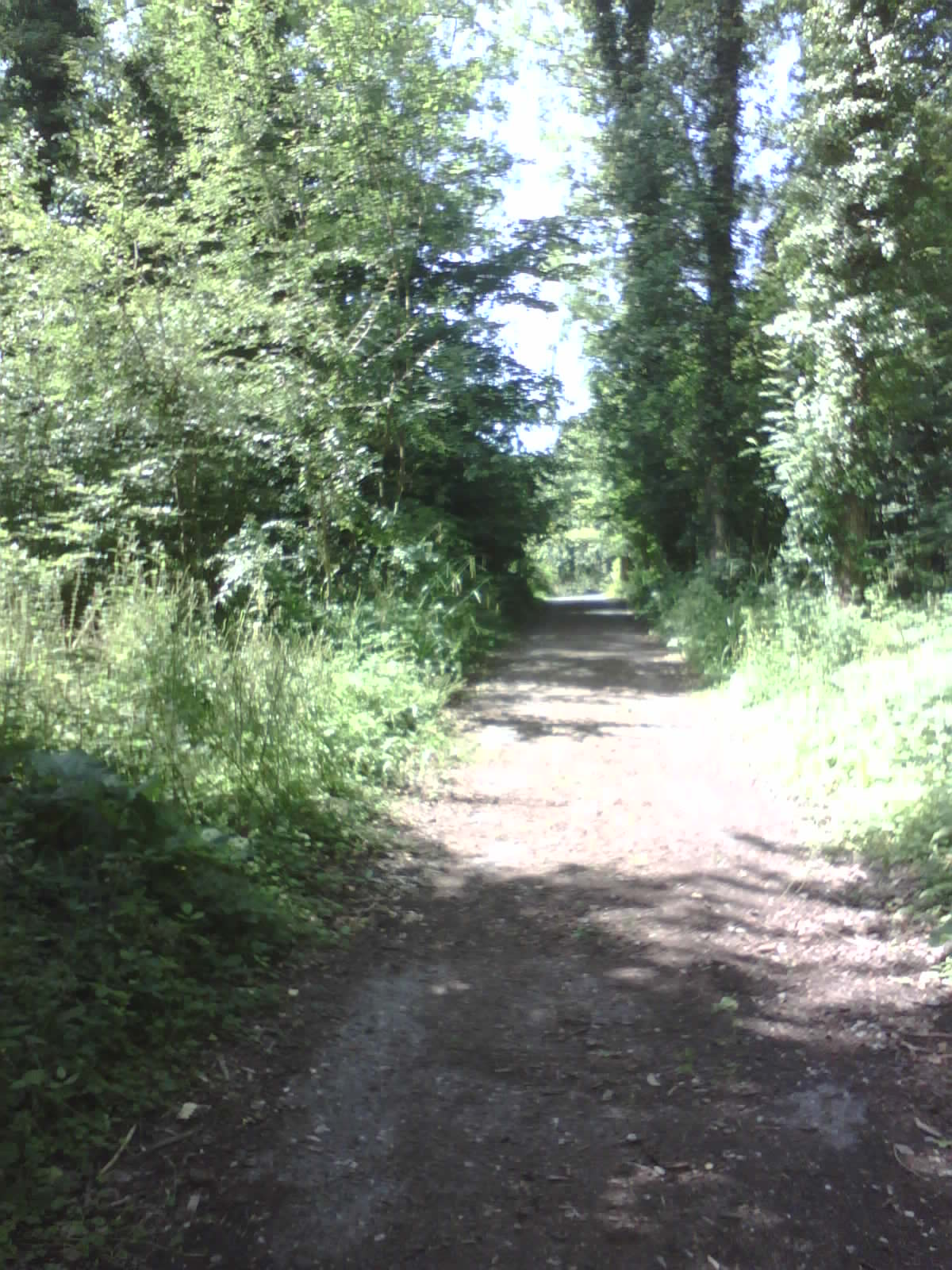
Main track in Tin Wood

== Impact on the community ==
The cinema was open to the Sparkwell villagers at no cost and it would provide a very welcome diversion for them. The increase of many young men into the community affected the residents, especially the eligible young female population. Also, the takings behind the bar at the Treby Arms had a dramatic increase.

== New arrivals ==
In 1943, American soldiers arrived. These men were billeted in tents on the lawns of Hemerdon House. During this year, Sparkwell became a hive of activity after three years of relative inactivity. Hemerdon is a small village bordering Sparkwell on the Plympton side. There, the pub The Miners Arms is situated.

== Community development ==
The Sparkwell Branch (a local organisation in Sparkwell) started to organise various dances and socials at which the new local band called the Sparklets were eager to play at. The Sparklets consisted of four members - John "Jumper" Collins (banjo), Harold Reed (drums), Percy Bickam (violin) and Miss May Blathford (piano). The American soldiers soon outnumbered the sailors at the Tin Wood (Beechwood) camp in attendance. The 1943 St. Valentine dance made a huge profit of £7.15s.0d from entry fees of just 1s.6d.

== The end ==
As the year of 1944 dawned, the tide of the war was beginning to turn in the favour of the Allies. Life in Sparkwell continued quite happily, intertwined with the lives of the British and foreign troops billeted in and around the parish. The dances, socials and cinema shows still proved popular. Rumours of the "2nd Front" were being spread abroad. In late May early June, large numbers of American military vehicles moved into the parish. Many roads and lanes were soon full with a wide variety of war vehicles. Suddenly on the 5–6 June 1944, the military presence disappeared. There were no more vehicles, no more troops, no loudspeaker announcements. It was D-Day (6 June 1944). The demolition firm of L.J Stephenson came to remove the Nissen huts, leaving only their concrete bases.

== Life in Tin Wood today ==
Today in Tin Wood, the concrete bases of the Nissen huts can still be seen, although nearly all are now concealed in the dense overgrowth. The wood is used mainly by walkers and riders. Only the concrete bases remain of the secret Naval Base in Tin Wood. Evidence of the camp can still be seen as the stone and gravel paths are visible in some parts, but most of them are obscured.
