= John Leake (NAAFI manager) =

English militaryman (1949–2000)

John Leake DSM
- Born: John Steven Leake; 26 October 1949; Erdington, Birmingham, England
- Died: 13 February 2000 (aged 50); Plymouth, England
- Burial place: Weston Mill, Plymouth, England
- Military career
- Allegiance: United Kingdom
- Branch: British Army; NAAFI; Royal Navy
- Rank: Canteen Manager (NAAFI); Petty officer (Royal Navy)
- Units: Devonshire and Dorset Regiment; HMS Ardent; HMS Sutherland
- Conflicts: Falklands War * Battle of San Carlos
- Awards: Distinguished Service Medal

John Steven Leake DSM (26 October 1949 – 13 February 2000) was an English recipient of the Distinguished Service Medal whilst working for the Navy, Army and Air Force Institutes (NAAFI), one of only twelve to be issued to the British forces during the Falklands War. Prior to working for the NAAFI, he worked in private security and was a soldier in the Devonshire and Dorset Regiment of the British Army.

== Early life ==
Born in Erdington, a suburb of Birmingham, England, Leake attended Albert Road School in Aston. Leake joined the Devonshire and Dorset Regiment, serving with the 1st Battalion of the Regiment in Northern Ireland. One of his roles was that of instructor in the use of the General-purpose machine gun.

At the age of 24, he left the British Army to work for private security companies, including for Securicor at Birmingham Airport. He was working for locally based IMI plc, when he decided to join the West Midlands Police, but after arriving early for his interview he read a local paper and saw an advertisement for the Navy, Army and Air Force Institutes (NAAFI), and decided to apply for a job with them instead.

== NAAFI career ==
By the time the Falklands War broke out in 1982, Leake was serving as a Canteen Manager in the Naval Canteen Service wing of the NAAFI on board HMS Ardent, a Royal Navy Type 21 frigate.

The ship was ordered to proceed to Ascension Island, where after three days it sailed onwards to the Falklands. On the morning of 7 May, Leake was invited to practise on a general-purpose machine gun, being informed afterwards that he was to take up that role at action stations should active service be declared, with his former role as casualty coordinator in sickbay being taken by his Canteen Assistant, Nigel Woods. While en route, active service was declared and Leake signed on to the Royal Navy on a temporary basis, becoming a petty officer and continuing in his role as Canteen Manager.

On 21 May, Ardent moved into position in Falkland Sound as the lead ship to bombard Argentine positions, aiming to divert enemy attention from the British landings in San Carlos Inlet. Leake manned a deck-mounted machine gun during the subsequent Argentine air attacks, and was credited with damaging a Douglas A-4 Skyhawk.

The aircraft was an A-4Q Skyhawk, tail number A-312 of CANA 3, which was recorded as "damaged [by] small arms fire from Ardent" and further hit by Lieutenant Morrell using 30 mm cannon. Unable to return to Argentina, the pilot, Teniente de Navío José Arca, flew to Stanley Airfield, ejected and was rescued, his aircraft crashing close to the shore.

Leake continued to man the gun while the ship was struck by multiple bombs, and eventually the order came to abandon ship. Along with the remaining crew, Leake boarded HMS Yarmouth, which pulled alongside the listing Ardent. He was later transferred to the SS Canberra.

After the Falklands conflict, Leake was posted to HMS Sutherland, and died on 13 February 2000 at St Luke's Hospice, Plymouth, from cancer, after previously having a kidney removed in an attempt to treat the disease. His funeral took place at the crematorium at Weston Mill, Plymouth on 21 February 2000.

== Private life ==
Leake married Carole, and together they had a son as well as two sons from Carole's previous marriage. At the time of Leake's death, he was living in Milehouse, Plymouth. He was one of five brothers, the others being David, Ian, Geoffrey, and Stephen.

== Legacy ==
Admiral Sandy Woodward, the commander of the British Naval Force during the Falklands War, wrote about Leake in his memoirs. He said, "I was sure there would be many stories of heroism to come out of it, but of them all, I remain most impressed by the conduct of John Leake who manned the machine gun in Ardent. He was not really in the Navy, but, as we say, we are all of one company, the Captain and the NAAFI man. And we all go together."

Following Leake's death in 2000, his medals were put up for auction on 23 September 2011. They sold for £110,000, beating the previous record paid for a Distinguished Service Medal set, which stood at £59,800 in 2003.

=== Honours and awards ===

Distinguished Service Medal Citation for Petty Officer John Steven Leake D197741A

Petty Officer Leake originally joined HMS Ardent as a civilian NAAFI Canteen Manager. On the declaration of Active Service, he volunteered to enrol as a Petty Officer on 15th May 1982. On 21st May 1982 HMS Ardent came under heavy attack by Argentine aircraft. Using his previous Army training, Petty Officer Leake was stationed as a machine gunner. Throughout the air attacks he remained cool and calm even though the ship was being hit by bombs and cannon fire. He fired large quantities of accurate tracer at the attackers and inflicted damage on a Skyhawk. His courage, steadfastness and total disregard for his own safety undoubtedly saved the ship from many further attacks and was an inspiration to all those in the vicinity.

== See also ==
- Tommy Brown
