= Canteen Stores Department (Bangladesh) =

Military-affiliated retail store in Bangladesh

- Seal of Canteen Stores Department
- Native name: CSD
- Type: Armed forces-owned
- Industry: Retail
- Headquarters: Dhaka Cantonment
- Owner: Bangladesh Armed Forces; Bangladesh Army
- Website: csdbangladesh.com

Canteen Stores Department, Bangladesh (CSD) is a military-affiliated retail chain store in Bangladesh. Owned and controlled by the Bangladesh Army, it provides a variety of food, electronics and other consumer goods. Army personnel are entitled to special discounts at all CSD outlets.

The popular local fast food chain, Captain's World is also owned and run by CSD. The first Captain's World branch opened in 2007 near Jahangir Gate of Dhaka Cantonment and a second branch opened in Uttara, Dhaka. The third branch of Captain's World was opened in 2011 in Dhanmondi. CSD also runs Captain's Bakery and Cinderella Shopping Mall.

The Quarter Master General of Bangladesh army is the Chairman of Control Board. The Managing Director is Brigadier General Sharif Md. Aman Hassan, SPP, ndc, psc. The Director of Supply and Transport of Army Headquarters, Quarter Master General's Branch (Supply and Transport Directorate) is the vice-chairman of Control Board.

== See also ==
- Canteen Stores Department (India)
- Canteen Stores Department (Pakistan)
