= Plymouth Citybus =

Bus operator in Plymouth, England

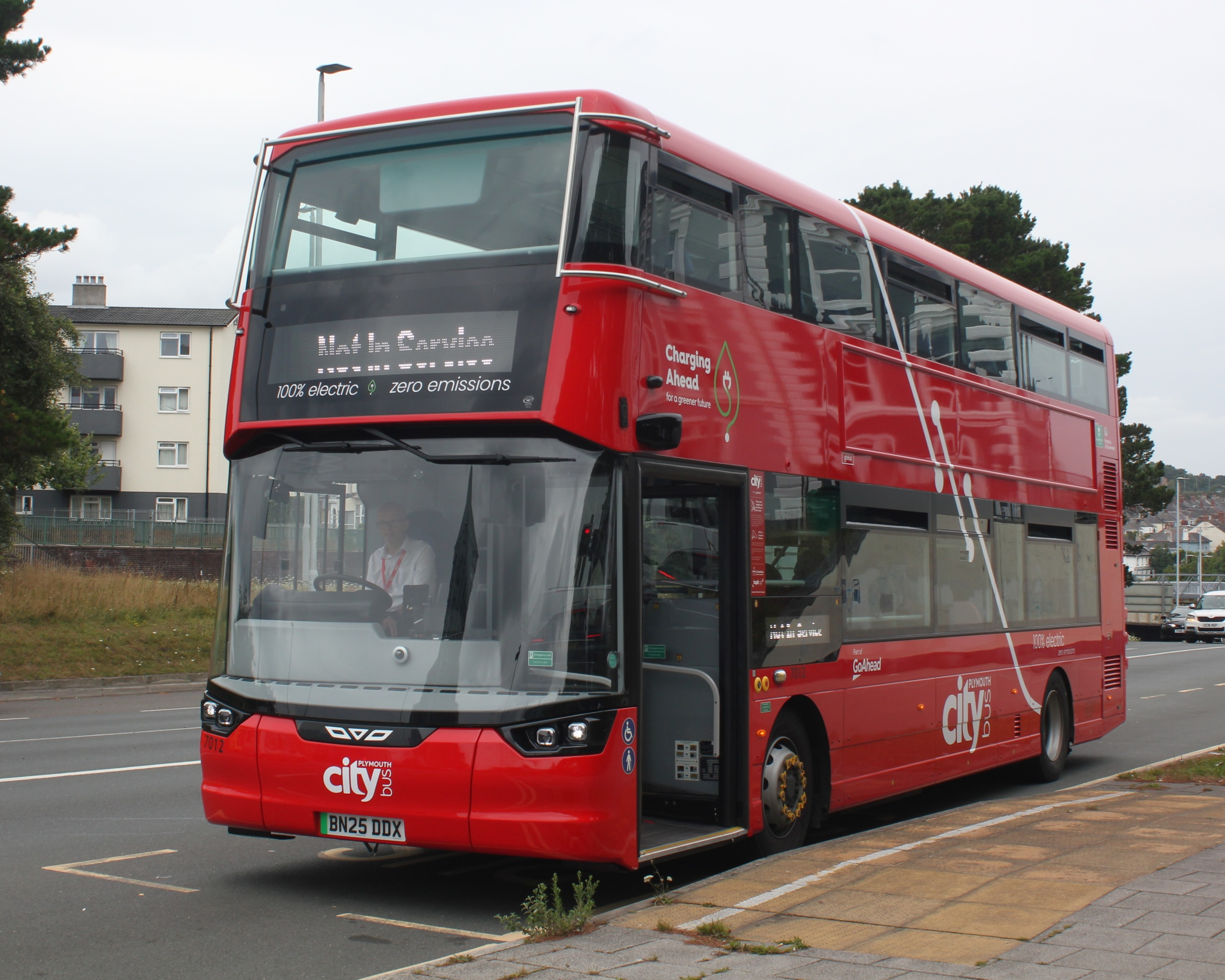
- Wright StreetDeck Electroliner, a new battery electric bus on Saltash Road in July 2025
- Parent: Go South West (Go-Ahead Group)
- Founded: 1892; 134 years ago
- Headquarters: Milehouse, Plymouth
- Service area: South-West Devon; Cornwall
- Service type: Bus and coach services
- Routes: 143
- Fleet: 300+ (April 2020)
- Chief executive: Richard Stevens
- Website: www.plymouthbus.co.uk

Plymouth Citybus is a bus operator in Plymouth. It is a subsidiary of the Go South West sector of the Go-Ahead Group.

== History ==
=== Plymouth City Transport ===
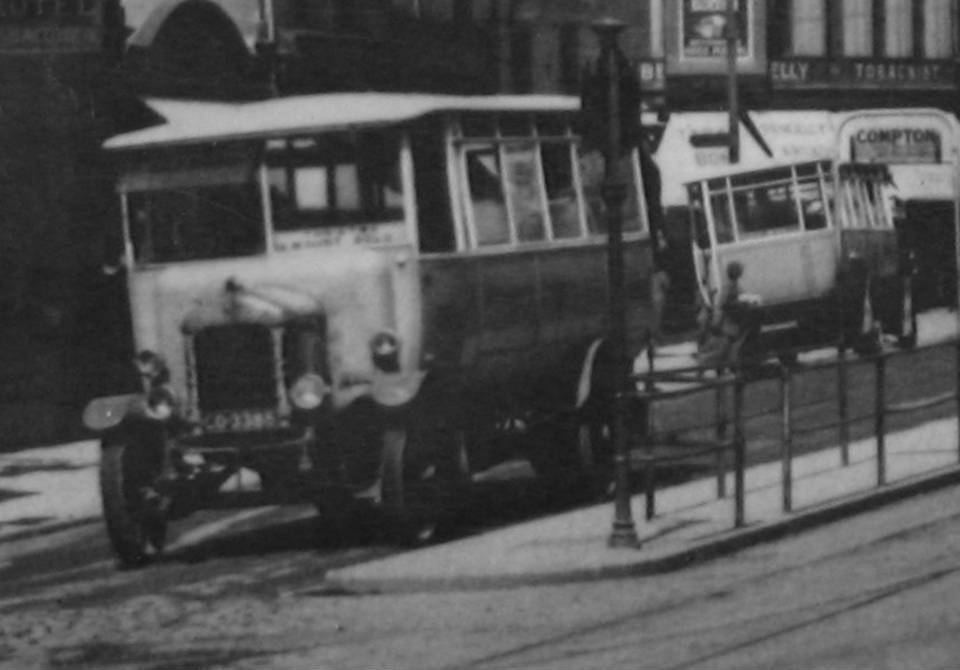
Two of the Corporation's first buses at the Theatre terminus in the early 1920s

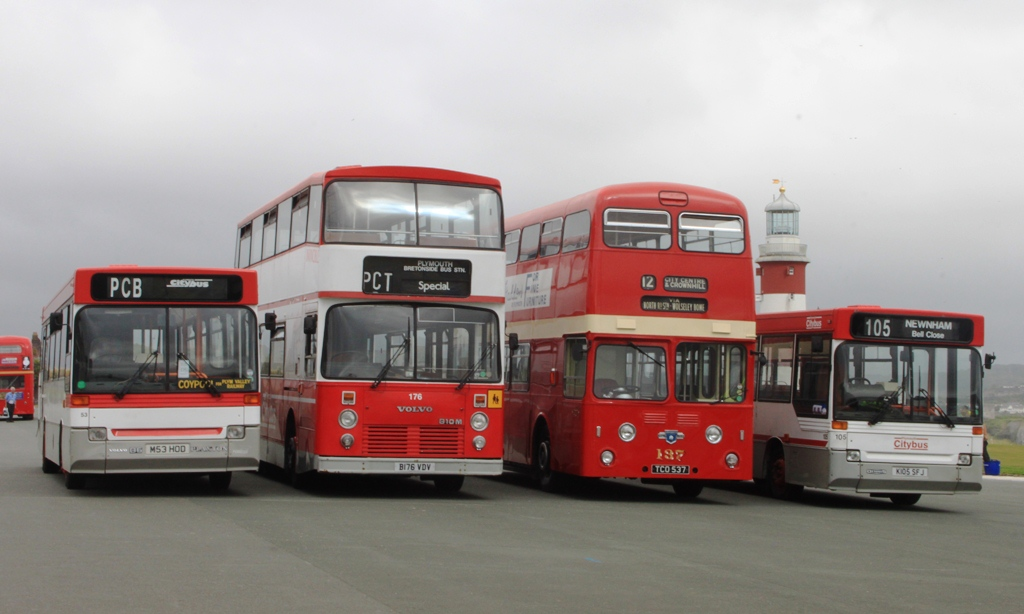
Preserved Volvo B6, Volvo Citybus, Leyland Atlantean & Dennis Dart at Plymouth Hoe in July 2013

In 1892, Plymouth Corporation purchased the horse-powered tramways of the Plymouth Tramway Company and placed them in the care of a new Tramways Department. The network was expanded and the horses were replaced by new electric tramcars between 1899 and 1906. Following the union of the Three Towns of Plymouth, Devonport and Stonehouse in October 1914, the Plymouth Tramways Department took control of the tramways in these places too. The Devonport and District Tramways was sold to the Corporation in 1914 (although the tracks of the two networks were not connected until October 1915) but the Plymouth, Stonehouse and Devonport Tramways, which dated back to 1872, remained an independent company until 1922 when it too was sold to the Corporation. The various depots of the old companies were slowly closed and the equipment and rolling stock concentrated at the old Devonport and District depot at Milehouse. Some new tramcars were constructed at the depot, and many more were completely stripped down and rebuilt. In 1923 new administrative offices were built there; that year saw the tram network at its greatest extent.

From 1920, the Corporation also operated motor buses on routes beyond the tram tracks. The first four bus routes were operated by a fleet of twenty single-deck 31-seat vehicles with solid tyres. By 1927 this had expanded to ten routes and 57 buses, some of which were one-man operated. Plymouth was granted city status in 1928 and the buses started to carry the city's coat of arms and the "Plymouth City Transport" name.

By 1930, it was becoming necessary to renew much of the tramway rolling stock. Consideration was given to converting to trolleybuses, but instead it was decided to implement a ten-year programme of bus replacement. The first line to be converted was the Devonport to St Budeaux line which was closed in October 1930 when six new double-deck buses replaced the trams. The line to West Hoe closed in 1931, the line to Compton closed in 1932, and regular services to the Royal Naval Barracks withdrawn in 1934. Further new buses were brought for these routes, and a few second hand tramcars from the now closed Exeter Tramway Company and Torquay Tramways allowed the oldest of the Plymouth cars to be withdrawn. In 1935 the Milehouse to Devonport line closed following the delivery of the city's first diesel-engined buses. More were needed in 1936 to allow the closure of the line to Prince Rock and in 1937 to allow the withdrawal of the two long circular routes. It was at this time that the bus routes were first numbered. The plan to close the remaining tram lines was put on hold because of the outbreak of World War II in 1939; they were powered by electricity generated by British coal, whereas the buses relied on imported fuel. The one remaining route, from Theatre to Peverell, kept running but following city centre bomb damage in April 1941 (when car 133 was destroyed) the service was only operated between Drake's Circus to Peverell until the final tram ran in September 1945.

A large part of the population of Plymouth moved out to the relative safety of the countryside during the war which meant that the Corporation's buses and trams were carrying fewer passengers, but rival Western National was under increasing pressure. Both operators had suffered damage to their depots and fleet – Milehouse was bombed in April 1941 – and so the two companies decided to pool resources under a Plymouth Joint Services agreement. This took effect from 1 October 1942 and resulted in 80% of mileage in and around the city were to be operated by the Corporation and 20% by Western National; the receipts were also divided in the same proportion, irrespective of which company operated which routes. This allowed Plymouth buses to operate beyond the city boundary to places such as Yelverton, Plympton and Wembury, while Western National were now allowed to pick up local passengers within the city where they had previously been restricted to only those travelling beyond the boundary. The Plymouth Joint Services agreement remained in place after the war, enabling both the Corporation and Western National to serve new housing estates that sprang up around the edge of the city. The routes in the Joint Services area, including those of Western National, were renumbered in a single sequence from 1 to 57 in 1957.

Buses with front entrances were delivered to Plymouth City Transport from 1960, which paved the way to conversion of routes to one man operation from 1968, the first operator in the South West of England to do so. To help speed boarding times the fares were restructured to multiples of 3d. Fare stages at regular 0.85 miles (1.37 km) intervals were introduced in December 1975 to further simplify the fare structure. In 1982, the fare stages were revised to one-mile intervals outside the city centre and promoted as 'Easyfare'; a journey in one zone cost 25p and increased in 10p stages to a maximum of 45p.

=== Plymouth Citybus ===
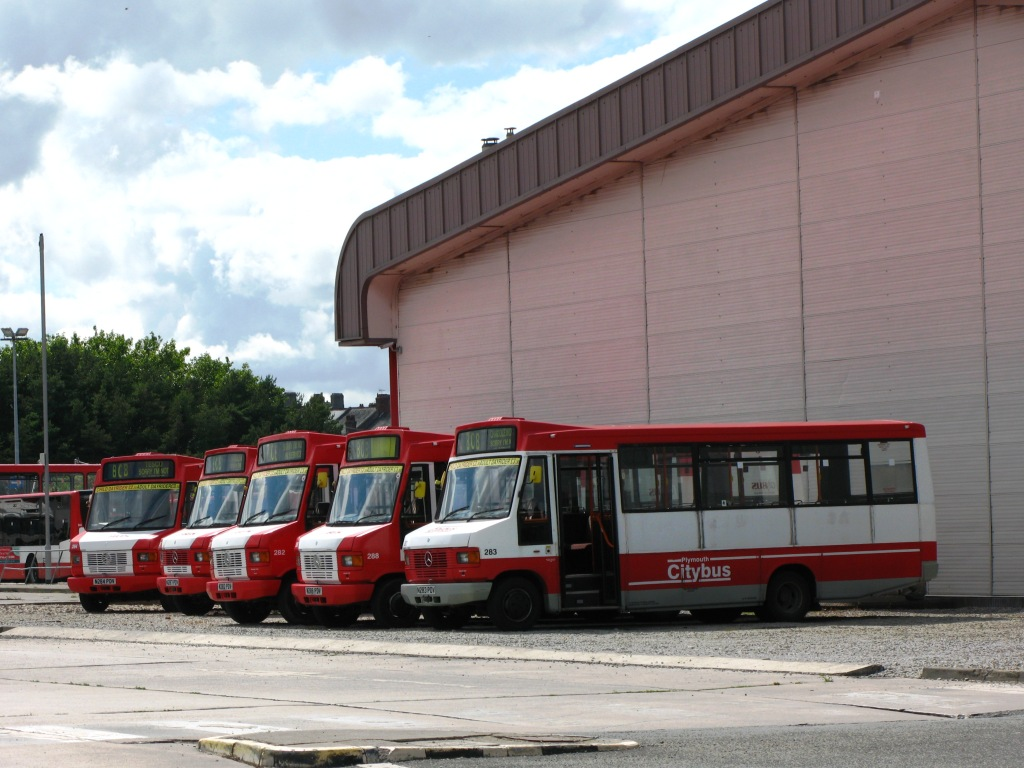
Plaxton Beaver 1-bodied Mercedes-Benz 709s parked outside the depot at Milehouse

During the early part of the 1980s, the National Bus Company (of which Western National was a subsidiary) undertook Market Analysis Projects in many areas to match services with demand. This resulted in most Plymouth Joint Services cross-city routes being split into two that terminated in the city centre from 24 October 1982, as the survey revealed that few passengers travelled across the city without changing buses. The revision saw annual mileage reduced from more than 5.4 million miles to around 4.5 million, and the fleet from 185 to 160 vehicles. Buses were repainted and given "Plymouth Citybus" branding.

For some time, the Citybus services had been operated to break even so that no financial support was needed from the Plymouth City Council, but the Transport Act 1985 required all council-owned bus operations to be established as limited companies. As a result, Plymouth Citybus Limited was formed as an 'arms-length' company owned by Plymouth City Council on 26 October 1986.

==== 1988 strike ====
On 21 January 1988, Citybus sacked 120 drivers who had stopped work to attend a mass meeting. Their colleagues walked out in solidarity and the Citybus service was crippled for two weeks. Western National, Citybus' former partner in the Joint Services, used this opportunity to lay on extra buses, using the same numbers as Citybus services they were replacing, and Western National also covered Citybus school and Dockyard routes.

The Plymouth Evening Herald reported daily on the war of words between Citybus Director Brian Fisher (formerly Principal Assistant Transport Manager for Plymouth City Transport) and Western National Director John Preece. Preece announced a £2 million (equivalent to £5,568,000 in 2025) order for new vehicles during the strike and threatened to give jobs to sacked Citybus drivers, while Fisher accused Western National of being "hell bent on profit" and stating that Plymouth Citybus "have the best interests of our customers at heart".

Agreement between Citybus management and unions was reached on 5 February, with drivers returning to work on 6 February and operating a free service for one day to compensate for the disruption caused. However, hostilities remained between Citybus and Western National, with a bus war breaking out in April 1988 after Citybus launched ten new services to compete with 18 new Western National services running into Plymouth. After a while, direct competition between the two companies ceased and they largely returned to operating their old routes.

At the end of the century, Citybus operated about 75% of routes in Plymouth along with a few routes beyond the city boundaries.

=== Go-Ahead Group ===
Previous logo until 2020 with some text and the dot on the "i" colored yellow.

In May 2009, Plymouth City Council announced that it intended to sell the company. Early interest came from the FirstGroup and local taxi owner John Preece, who had been behind the privatisation of Western National and had made previous attempts to purchase Citybus. The proposed sale led to increased competition in the city but FirstGroup withdrew its interest, with the council's proposal to sell debated in the House of Commons in October 2009. A £20 million bid by the Go-Ahead Group was accepted in November 2009.

== Operations ==
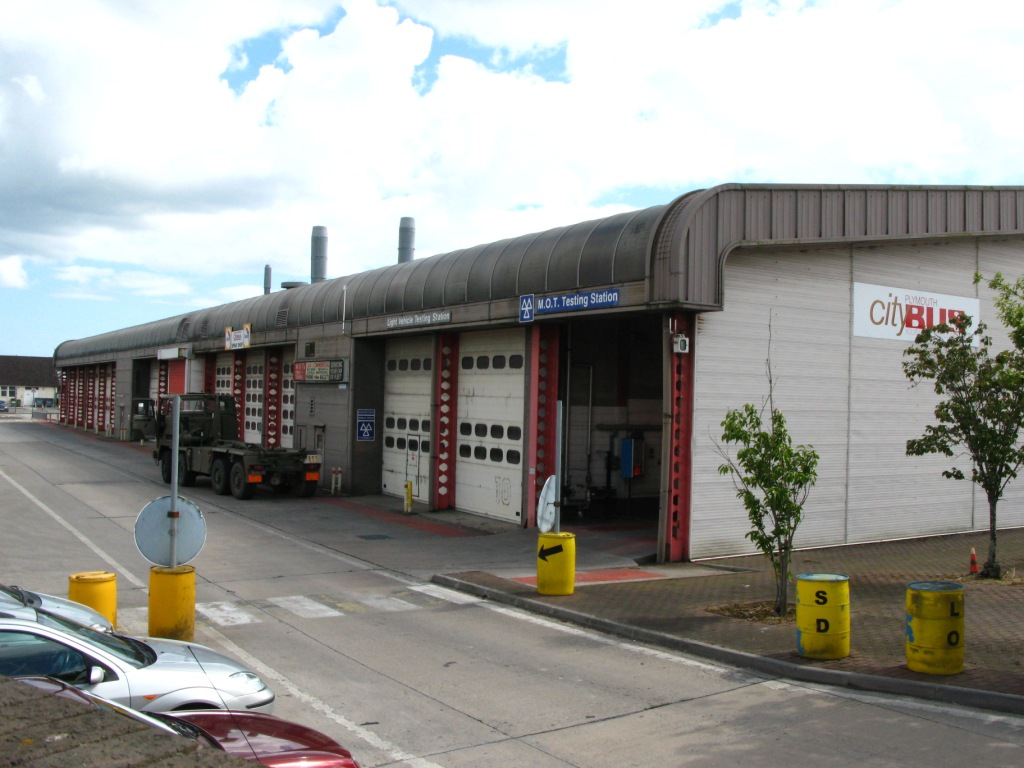
The Plymouth Citybus Milehouse depot in June 2011

As of October 2025, the combined Plymouth Citybus and Go Cornwall Bus operations employed 850 people, operated 344 buses and coaches from a single depot in Milehouse and carried about 20 million passengers annually. In addition to its bus and coach operations, Plymouth Citybus also provides vehicle repairs and servicing for other commercial road operators and private car drivers through its Car and Commercial division.

=== Go Southwest Coach Hire ===
Plymouth City Transport's first coach-seated vehicle was a Leyland National fitted with coach seats. A separate coaching unit branded 'Plymouth Citycoach' was later created by Citybus in 1988 with its own management and a remit to produce a profit. Plymouth Citycoach offered both advertised day trips and holiday tours, as well as hiring out its vehicles. It initially carried a version of the bus livery, but generally with more white.

Plymouth Citycoach was closed in June 2020 as a result of financial difficulties encountered during the COVID-19 pandemic, but was reintroduced in 2023 using the 'Go South West Coach Hire' brand. First South West sold their Cornish 'Truronian' coach operation to Go South West in February 2026 following the company's withdrawal from Cornwall. Go South West’s coach services now operate as Dartline Coaches and Truronian.

=== Go Cornwall Bus ===
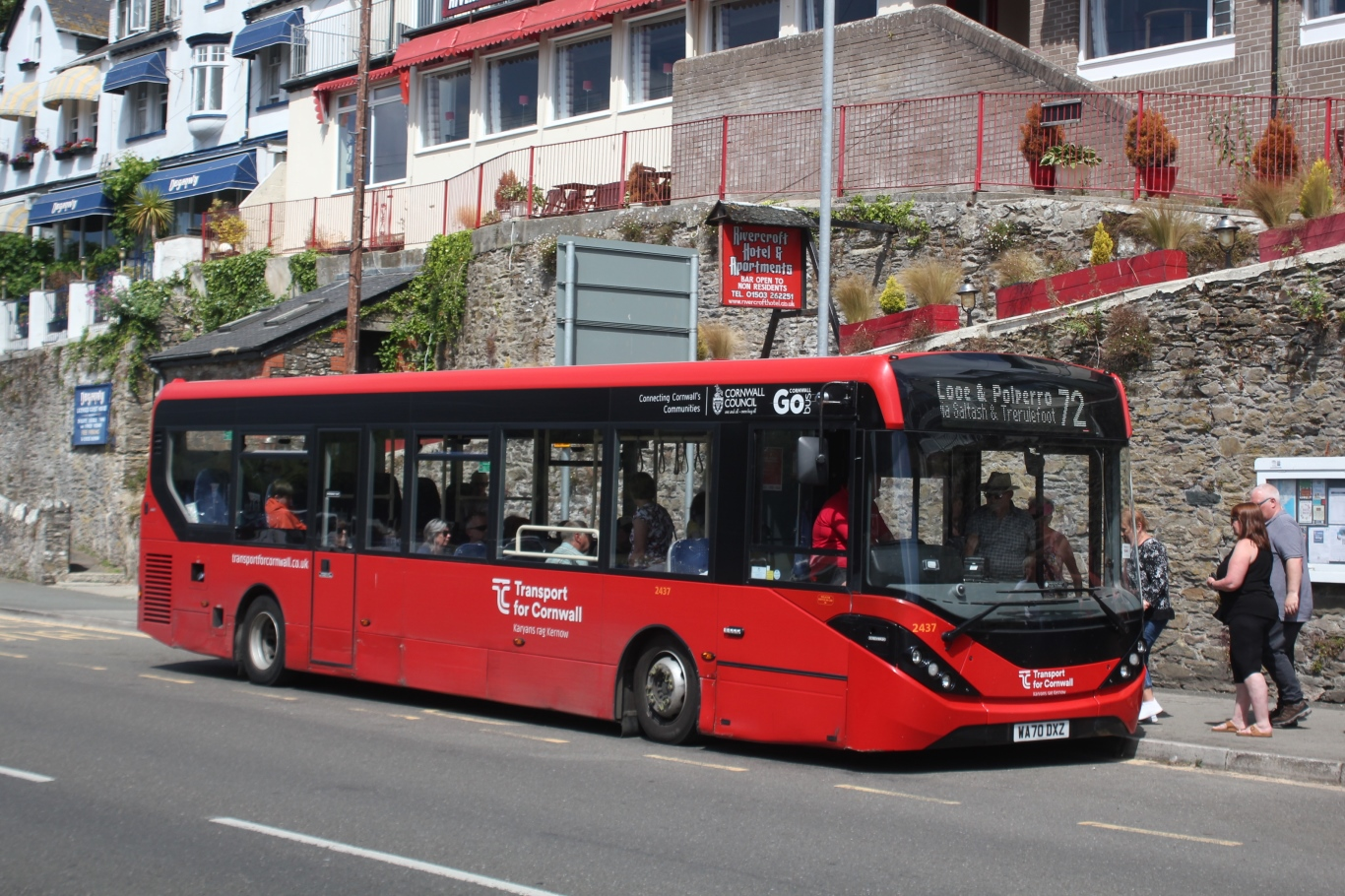
Go Cornwall Bus Alexander Dennis Enviro200 MMC in Looe in June 2023

The Liskeard-based operations of Western Greyhound, which as a whole had been put up for sale, were purchased on 8 December 2014 and relaunched as Go Cornwall Bus (Cornish: Kewgh Kyttrin Kernow). This included the Liskeard-Plymouth section of route 593, operated using nine Optare Solos acquired from Western Greyhound, but the Liskeard-Newquay section of the same route remained with Western Greyhound until their eventual closure, with through tickets being made available.

It was announced on 6 January 2020 that Cornwall Council had awarded the tender for the entire county's bus network (except the Truro Park & Ride) to the Go-Ahead Group from 1 April. The network, operating under the Go Cornwall Bus brand, consists of 73 bus services operated by approximately 130 vehicles. FirstGroup subsidiary Kernow retained the Truro Park & Ride contract and continued to run their commercially-operated services.

Go Cornwall launched four commercial bus services in direct competition with part of First's Cornish network on 31 August 2025. Commentators claimed Go Cornwall was "going in for the kill" and in November 2025 First announced that they would cease operations in Cornwall on 14 February 2026. Go Cornwall entered into talks with Cornwall County Council to provide replacement services for communities affected by the withdrawal of First's services. Timetables for Go Cornwall's replacement services were released by Transport for Cornwall (Cornish: Karyans rag Kernow) on 5 January 2026, with services reverting to a numbered network with some minor changes to routing and timing.

=== 'Flash' services ===
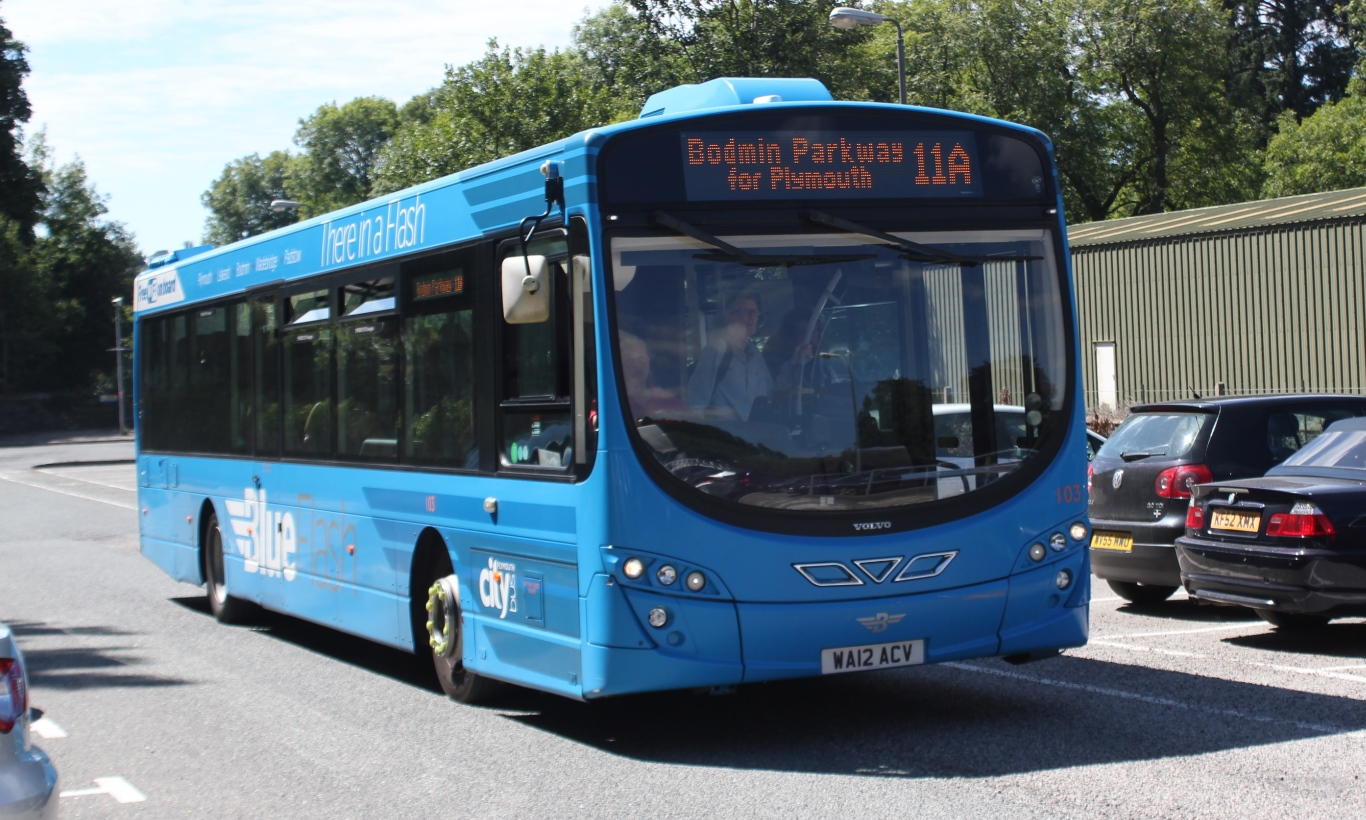
The 42B BlueFlash (July 2018)

In more recent years, Plymouth Citybus launched a range of services known as the Flash, with the colour of the livery preceding Flash, with Red, Blue, Green, Yellow and Orange. The Red Flash being the 21/21A service between Barne Barton and Chaddlewood, BlueFlash being varying guises of the 42's services to Tamerton Foliot, Derriford, Woolwell & Tavistock using both Alexander Dennis Enviro400 & Wright Eclipse vehicles, then the 11 between Plymouth and Bodmin, in Cornwall, repurposing the Wright Eclipse single-decks. GreenFlash was the name given to the commuter services 8/9 and 23/24 between the City Centre and Efford and Mount Gould, as well as the 5/A/B/C serving Plymstock. YellowFlash buses were commonly Enviro400s running the 50/A/51 services that loop around the City in clockwise and anticlockwise directions, serving the City Centre, Plymouth railway station, Camels Head, Derriford Hospital, Estover and Marsh Mills. The final addition, the OrangeFlash, was service 43 between the City Centre and Ernesettle, with the buses running the route being CNG fuelled MAN EcoCitys transferred from Anglianbus.

'Flash' branding was withdrawn in favour of the default Plymouth Citybus brand. Branding for Red Flash 21/21A was replaced by a new 'SPARK' brand with the delivery of Alexander Dennis Enviro400 Citys in 2017 which is being faded out in 2026.

== Fleet ==
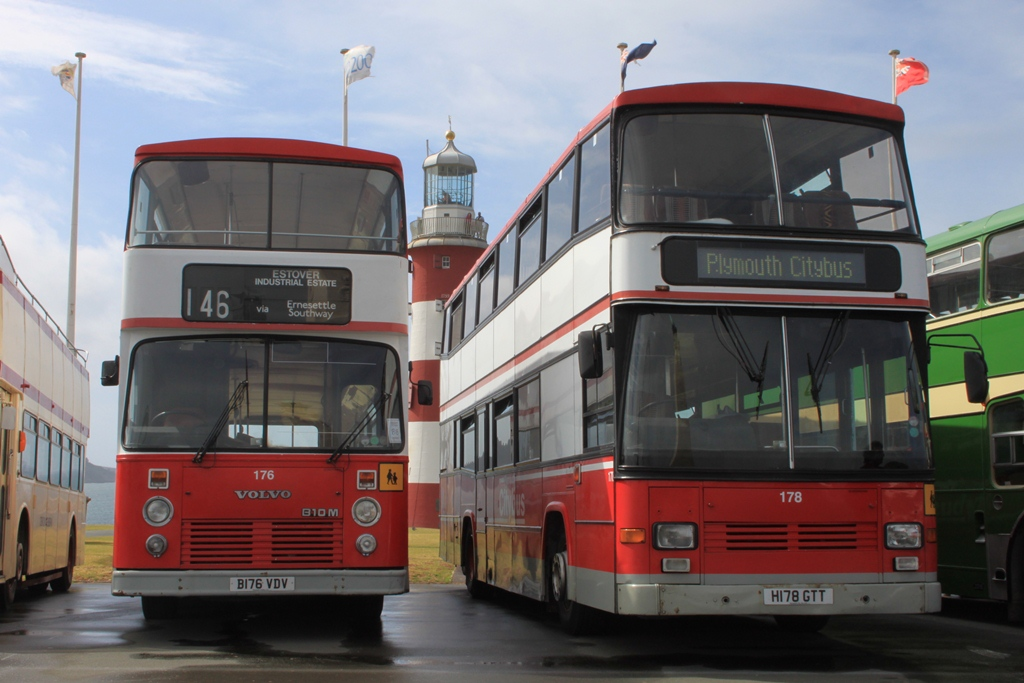
Two preserved Volvo B10M Citybus buses at Plymouth Hoe in July 2013

The first buses delivered in 1920 were twenty 31-seat Straker-Squire vehicles with solid tyres.

By 1927 the fleet included Burford, Shelvoke and Drewry, Guy and AEC models and totalled 57 buses; The tram replacement scheme of 1930 saw the introduction of double-deck buses, initially Leyland TD1s. by 1929 it had expanded to 83. As well as more Leylands, some Dennis Lancet buses were brought for later route conversions. In 1935 the city's first diesel-engined double-deck buses were delivered (more Leylands); some as tram replacements and others so that older single-deck buses could be replaced. During the war a mixture of buses were acquired as few new buses were being built. Further Leyland Titan PD1 buses were delivered once production resumed after the war, but the spread of suburbs onto the hilly hinterland saw more powerful Leyland PD2s entering service from 1948.

Leyland Atlanteans were introduced from 1960. These had rear-engines and front entrances which eventually paved the way to conversion to one man operation from 1968. Single-deck buses reappeared in the fleet in 1975 in the shape of Leyland Nationals. In October 1986, 85 Renault/Dodge S56A minibuses were introduced, which represented 70% of the Citybus fleet at the time. These allowed narrow housing estate roads to be served and service frequencies to be increased on existing routes. They were replaced by Mercedes-Benz 709D minibuses. Mid-size single deck buses replaced most double-deck vehicles on busier routes to give high service frequencies, principally Dennis Darts.

As of October 2025, the fleet consists of 344 buses and coaches, which include:

- Mercedes-Benz Citaros (training vehicles)
- Alexander Dennis Enviro200s
- Alexander Dennis Enviro200 MMCs
- Alexander Dennis Enviro400s
- Alexander Dennis Enviro400 Citys
- Alexander Dennis Enviro400 MMCs
- Scania N94UD OmniDekkas
- Mercedes-Benz Sprinter City45s
- Volvo B9TL Wright Eclipse Gemini 2’s
- Wright Streetdeck Electroliners

=== Preservation ===
A number of Plymouth City Transport and Plymouth Citybus vehicles have been preserved by members of the Plymouth City Transport Preservation Group.

== Liveries and brands ==
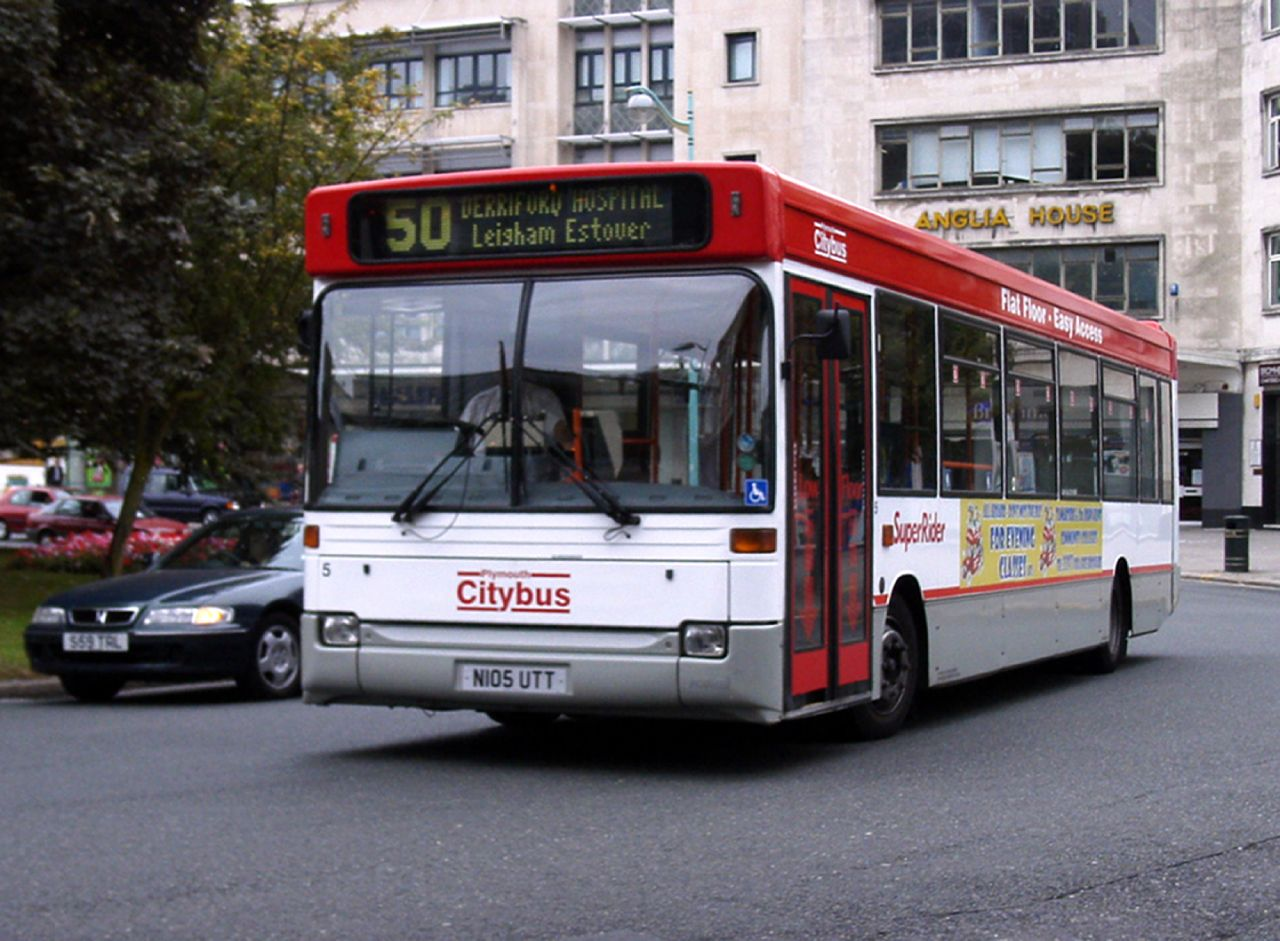
Plaxton Pointer bodied Dennis Dart in September 2002 in the former red, white and grey livery

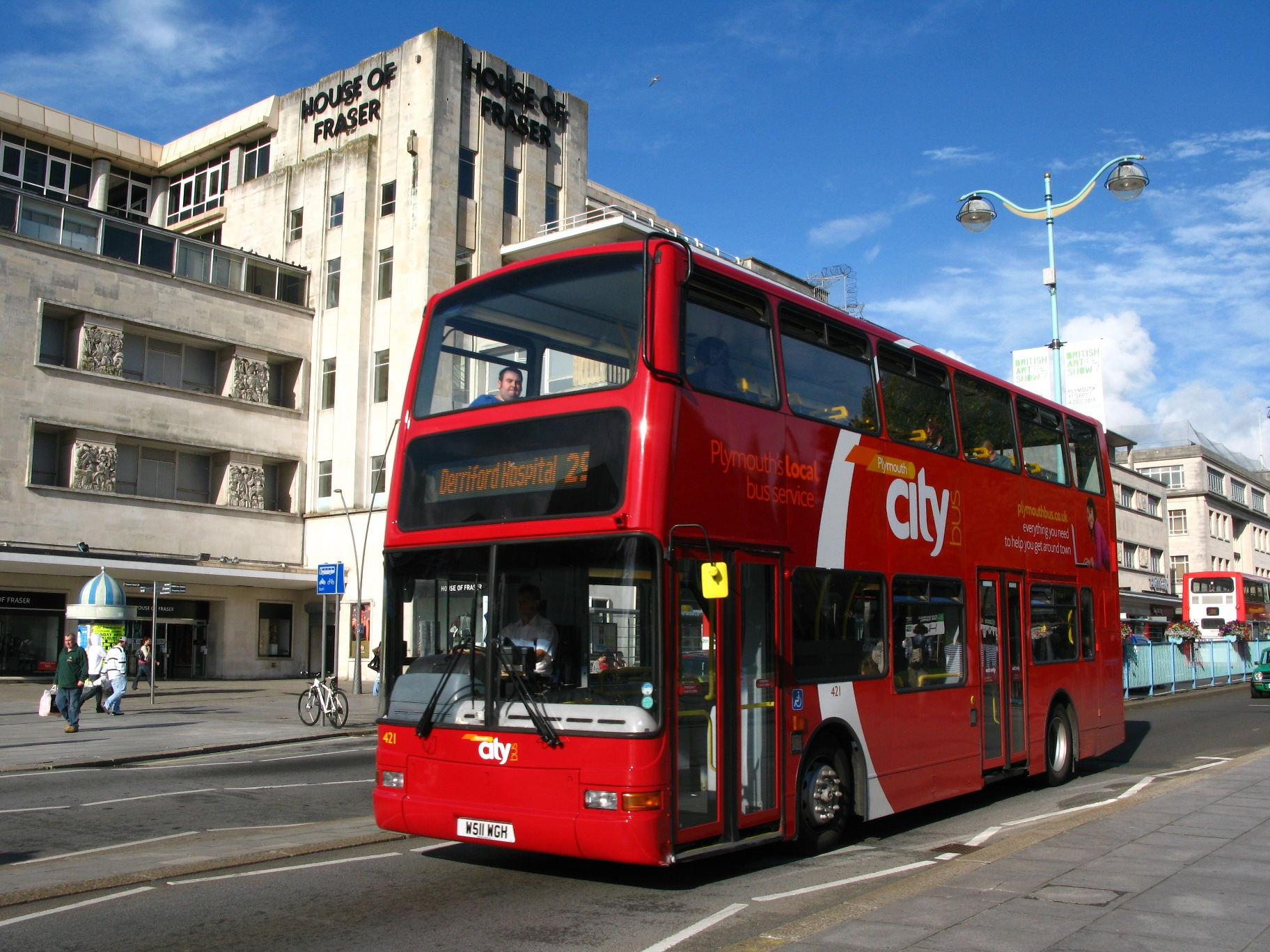
Plaxton President bodied Volvo B7TL in the Best Impressions designed livery.

Plymouth City Tramways initially used a maroon colour scheme but a yellow and white livery was introduced in 1922 although some had varnished teak bodies. A change to maroon and white was made in 1929. Buses later used a bright red and cream livery.

A new image (designed by Ososki Graphics of Exmouth) was introduced to coincide with the revised Plymouth Joint Services network in 1982. Plymouth's red and cream colours were retained, but the cream area was extended below the lower deck windows and also added around the upper deck windows; the red skirt was upswept at the rear. The new 'Plymouth City bus' logo was placed on the cream below the windows near the centre of each side; 'city' was red and the other words black. Western National buses used on Plymouth Joint Services carried the same 'Plymouth City bus' logos on a broad white panel around the lower deck on their otherwise green buses. Six Bristol LHs that operated beyond the city boundaries were given a matching 'Country bus' logo, and a Leyland National with a wheelchair lift was branded as 'Mobility bus'. The Minibuses introduced in 1986 were painted in cream with red and orange bands and branded 'City shuttle'.

A few years later a black, red and white livery was adopted for all buses, but the black was eventually replaced by grey. When low floor buses were introduced they were given 'Super Rider' branding. Park and ride services were introduced using Mercedes-Benz minibuses in a mid-grey scheme but the Dennis Dart MPDs that replaced them were given special green and yellow livery.

The red, white and grey livery later became red and white in 2005. Following the takeover by Go Ahead in 2009, Best Impressions designed a two tone red livery with a white 'swoosh', this accompanied a new version of the Plymouth CityBus logo. However this has since been adapted by the company, who now use a plain red with a different style of swoosh (which covers more of the bus) and a simplified version of the Best Impressions devised logo. The new livery is often dubbed as 'Lines'.
