= California School for the Deaf =

California School for the Deaf may refer to:

- California School for the Deaf, Fremont
- California School for the Deaf, Riverside
