= Navy, Army and Air Force Institutes =

Company serving the British Armed Forces

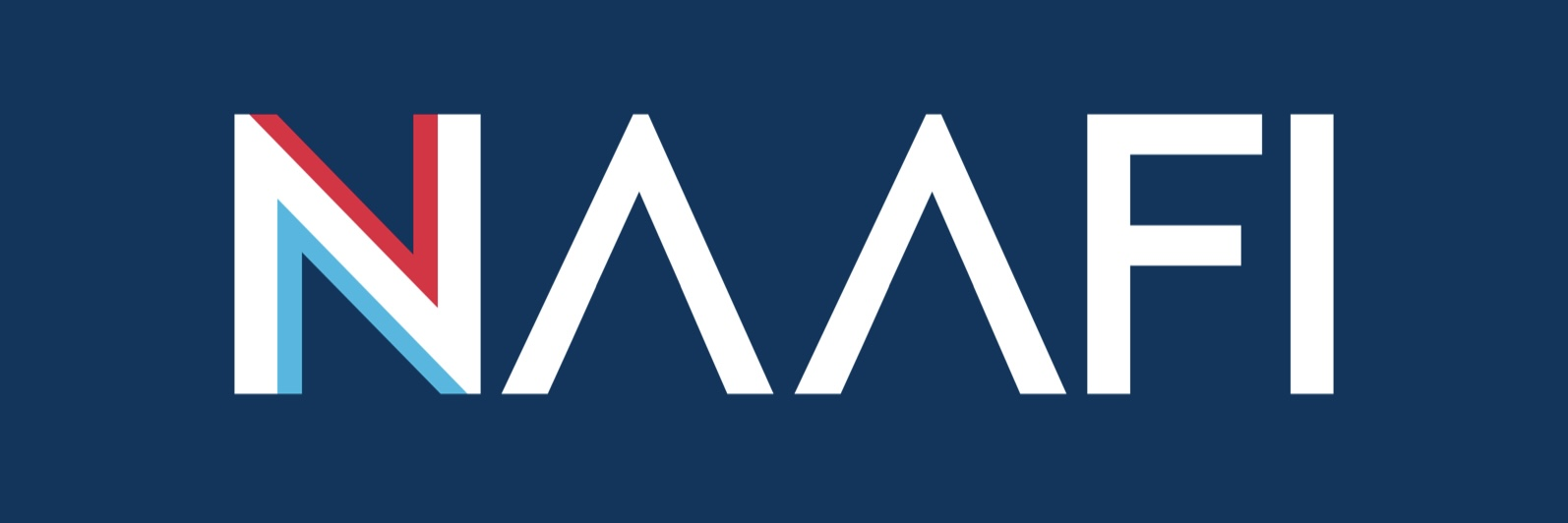
- Type: Not-for-profit organisation
- Industry: Retail
- Predecessors: Expeditionary Force Canteens and the Navy and Army Canteen Board
- Founded: 9 December 1920; 105 years ago
- Headquarters: NAAFI, Forum 5, Solent Business Park, Parkway, Whiteley, Fareham, PO15 7PA
- Key people: Steve Marshall OBE (CEO)
- Revenue: ▲£44.2 million (2024)
- Parent: Ministry of Defence
- Website: naafi.co.uk

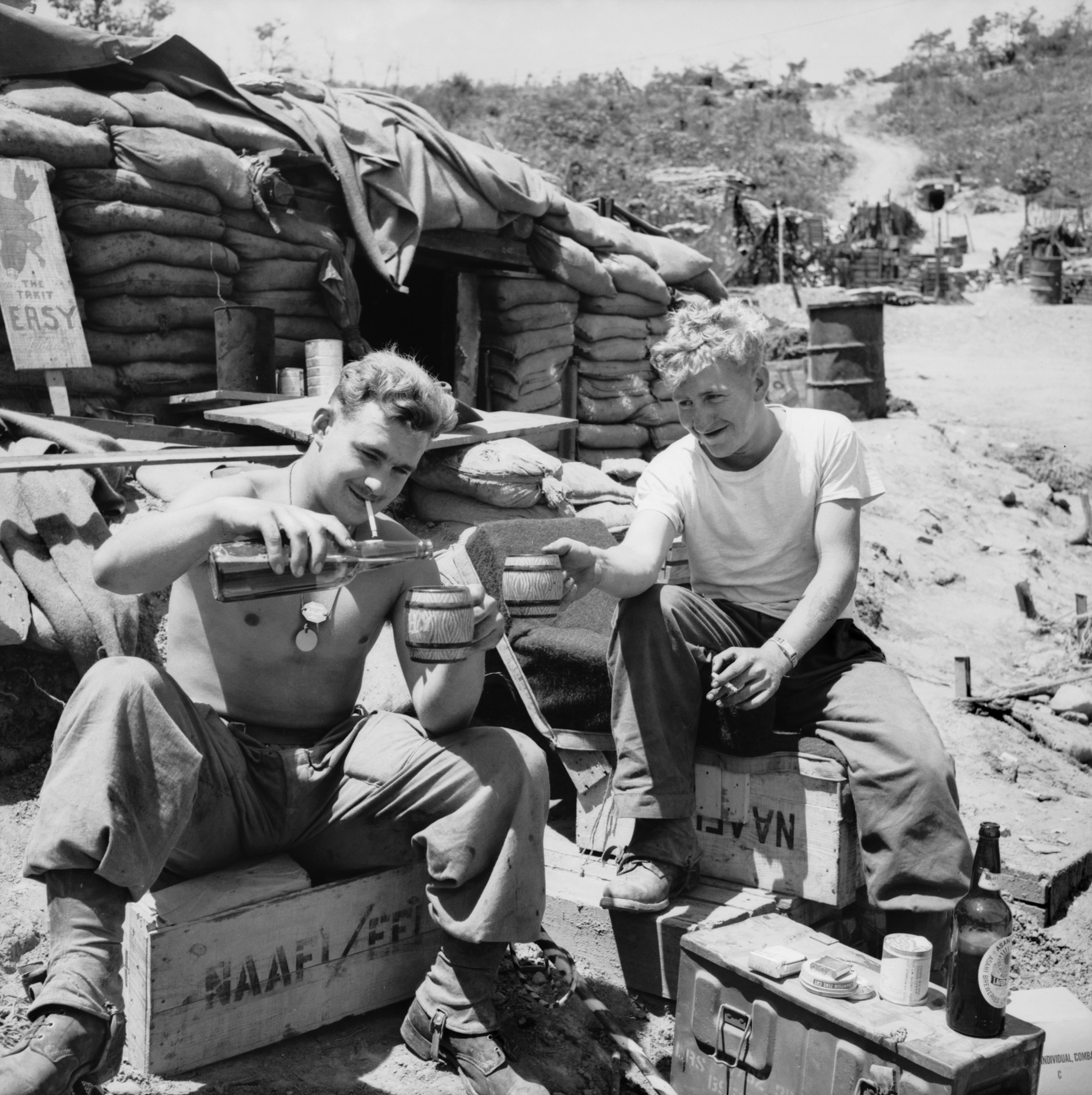
Two Australian Army soldiers enjoy some recreation time at a sandbagged Navy Army Air Force Institute (NAAFI) in Korea, 1952

The Navy, Army and Air Force Institutes (NAAFI /ˈnæfiː/) is a company created by the British government on 9 December 1920 to run recreational establishments needed by the British Armed Forces, and to sell goods to servicemen and their families. It runs clubhouses, bars, shops, supermarkets, launderettes, restaurants, cafés and other facilities on most British military bases and also canteens on board Royal Navy ships. Commissioned officers are not usually supposed to use the NAAFI clubs and bars, since their messes provide these facilities and their entry, except on official business, is considered to be an intrusion into junior ranks' private lives.

NAAFI personnel serving aboard ship are part of the Naval Canteen Service (NCS), wear naval uniform and have action stations, but remain ordinary civilians. NAAFI personnel can also join the Expeditionary Force Institutes (EFI), which provides NAAFI facilities in war zones. EFI personnel are members of the Army Reserve serving on special engagements, who bear ranks and wear uniform. NCS personnel can similarly volunteer to join the Royal Navy when it goes on active service.

== Background ==
In 1892, the Hon. Lionel Fortescue, Canteen President of the 17th Lancers, became dissatisfied with the corrupt way in which canteen finances were being handled. He established a system for keeping a locked till in the canteen and put Sergeant John Gardner in charge, an honest and able man who would later look after hundreds and thousands of pounds as one of the staff of the Navy and Army Canteen Board during the First World War.

The locked till practice was soon adopted by other regiments, until another Canteen Officer, Major Harry Crauford of the Grenadier Guards was also dissatisfied with the food provided for his canteen and approached Lionel Fortescue with the idea of forming a cooperative society and doing their own buying. Together, they managed to raise £400 and founded the Canteen and Mess Co-operative Society. The rule was that interest was not to exceed five percent and all further profits were to be handed to the regimental canteens as a rebate.

They hoped in time the cooperative would become a buying and distributing agency for the whole army. In August 1914, all arrangements were upset by the outbreak of World War I.

The British Expeditionary Force – the greater part of Britain's regular army – was sent to France and hundreds of thousands of young men enlisted to fight for the King and the country.

The Government was unprepared for the problem of supplying and feeding the forces on a scale never before experienced, so a large army entered the field with insufficient official provision. Fortunately the Canteen and Mess Society was still active and was the only contractor which was more concerned with the welfare of the troops than with making money. The head of the society was summoned to the War Office together with the managing director of Richard Dickenson and Company, the soundest and most experienced firm of the canteen contractors. The two organisations were invited to establish a special department and subsequently joined as the Expeditionary Canteens to serve the nation.

Even with the extra money and their combined strength, the service could not be increased fast enough to match the huge expansion of the Armed Forces. In the meantime, many new contractors were finding loopholes for exploiting the situation and it became clear that safeguards were needed to protect the interests of the soldiers and supervise the operations of all these vested interests.

In January 1915, a Board of Control was formed and exactly two years later the Army Canteen Committee was registered at the Board of Trade as a company trading not for profit. It absorbed the Canteen and Mess Society, and took over the contracts of Dickenson's and all the other firms supplying the army in the UK. Within three months it also took over all canteens abroad where British troops were stationed during peace times. The Expeditionary Force Canteens were left in charge in the main theatres of war.

Francis Towle was appointed as Controller of the Canteen Board in 1916 and served in the post until 1919, after the end of the war.

In June 1917, the Royal Navy was keen to share in the benefits now being felt by the British soldier and so the Army Canteen Committee assumed the new title of the Navy and Army Canteen Board. When the Royal Air Force (RAF) became a separate arm of the nation's defences in 1918, their canteens were absorbed into the Navy and Army Canteen Board.

Fortescue's vision of a unified canteen system for the Forces was starting to take shape and the nucleus of NAAFI was now in place.

== Establishment ==
After the First World War, the Expeditionary Force Canteens (EFC) and the Navy and Army Canteen Board (NACB) did not return to the gratitude of the nation. This was because EFC had made a large amount of profit from the sales of goods to the troops and opinion was divided as to what should be done with the money.

In March 1920, Winston Churchill, then Secretary of State for War, set up a committee to advise on the kind of organisation which would be needed for the Armed Forces in the future. The findings were unanimous; there should be one organisation to serve all three services, it should be permanent and it should be able to rapidly expand or contract at times of war or peace. The Navy, Army, Air Force Institutes was therefore established on 6 December 1920 and started trading as NAAFI in 1921.

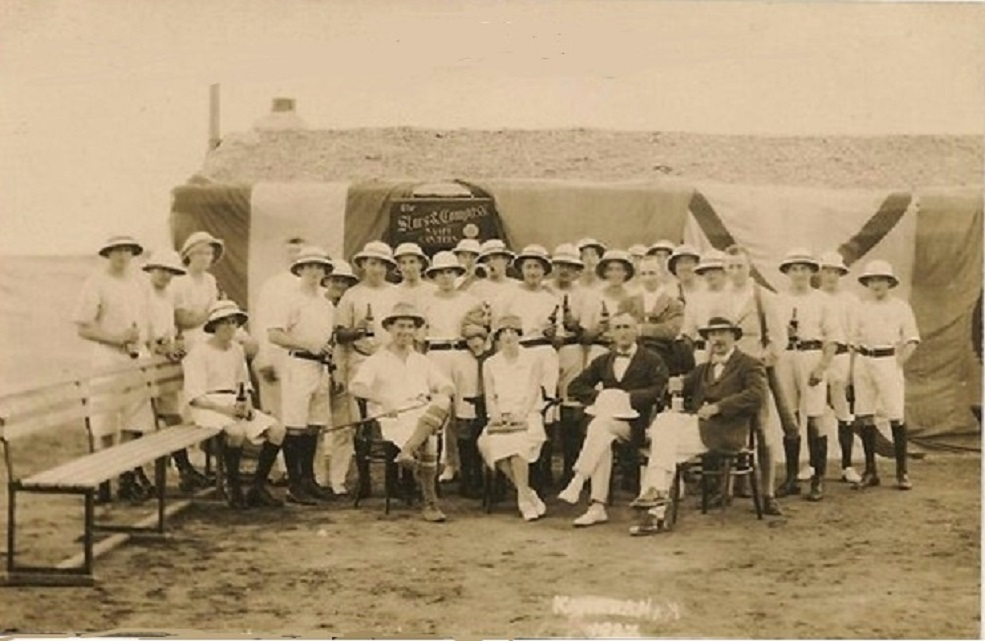
European personnel outside Kamaran Island's NAAFI canteen in 1927

As a not-for-profit organisation, with no shareholders to reward, NAAFI was asked to run the catering and recreational establishments needed by the armed forces. It had to make a profit for the good of the NAAFI customers – the men and women of the British Armed Forces – and so in addition it undertook to sell goods to servicemen and their families over and above those that were initially provided by the Royal Army Service Corps (RASC). The servicemen would benefit directly by getting cash rebates and discounts on purchases and indirectly through surpluses given back as a whole from each year's trading.

For the first time the troops overseas were able to buy the same things in the canteen abroad as they could at home. NAAFI first saw overseas service in Ireland in 1922. Six years later NAAFI would have a presence in Bermuda, Ceylon, Germany, Gibraltar, Iraq, China, Jamaica, Malta, and the Middle East.

== Second World War ==
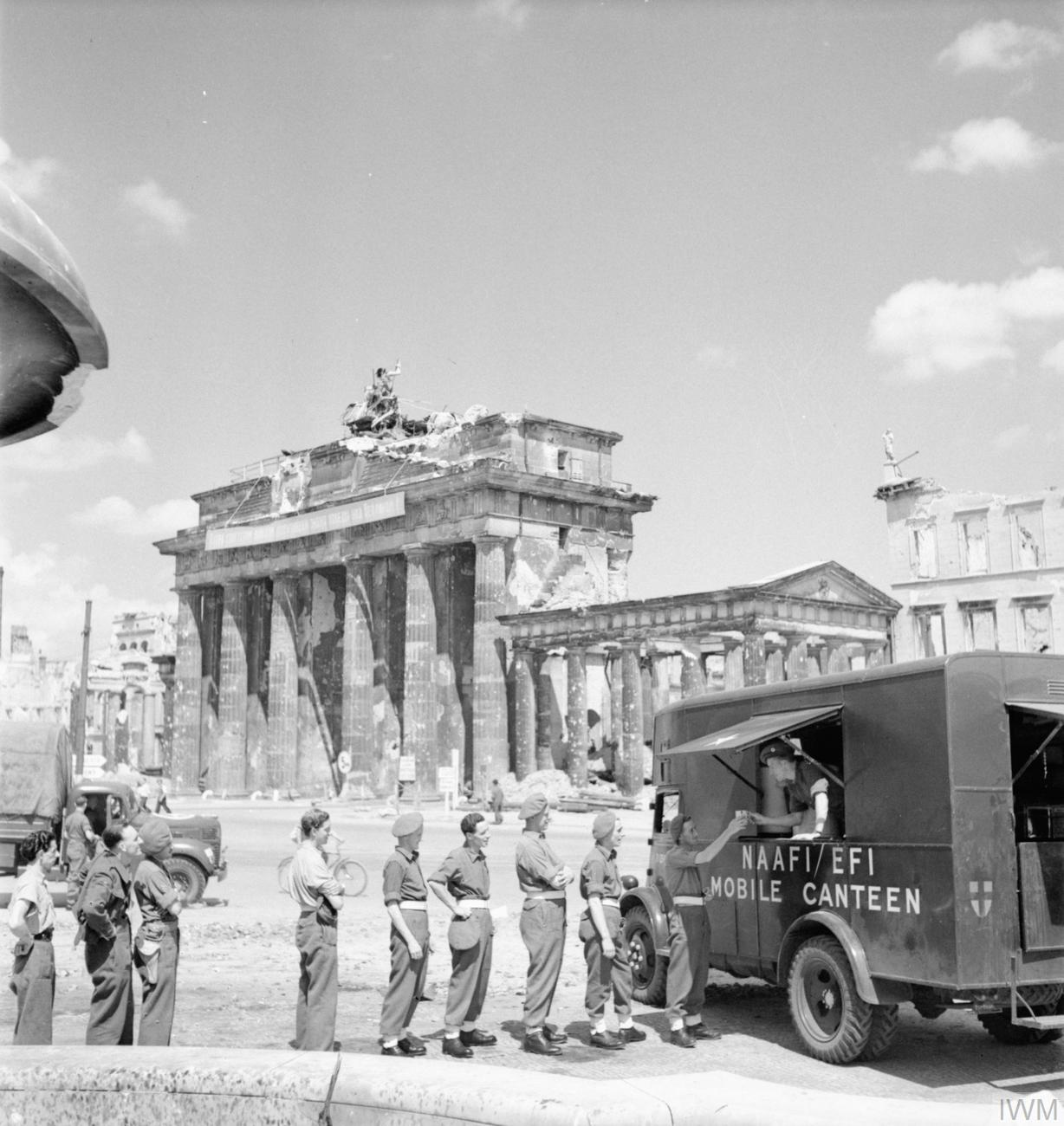
British soldiers queue for tea at NAAFI Mobile Canteen No. 750 beside the Brandenburg Gate, Berlin, July 1945. This van was the first mobile NAAFI to operate in Berlin.

The NAAFI's greatest contribution was during World War II. The Chairman and CEO during the war years was Sir Lancelot Royle and by April 1944 the NAAFI ran 7,000 canteens and had 96,000 personnel (expanded from fewer than 600 canteens and 4,000 personnel in 1939). It also controlled ENSA, the forces entertainment organisation. In the 1940 Battle of France alone, the EFI had nearly 3,000 personnel and 230 canteens.

Male EFI personnel were members of the Royal Army Service Corps until 1965, then the Royal Army Ordnance Corps. Since 1993 they have been members of the Royal Logistic Corps. Female personnel were members of the Auxiliary Territorial Service until 1949, then the Women's Royal Army Corps until 1992, when they joined the RAOC (and later the RLC).

NAAFI assistant Tommy Brown was awarded the George Medal for assisting with the 1942 retrieval of U-boat documents that aided in breaking part of the German Enigma code.

== Falklands War ==
Petty Officer John Leake, NCS canteen manager onboard HMS Ardent, was awarded the Distinguished Service Medal in the 1982 Falklands War for his courage while manning a machine gun.

== Today ==
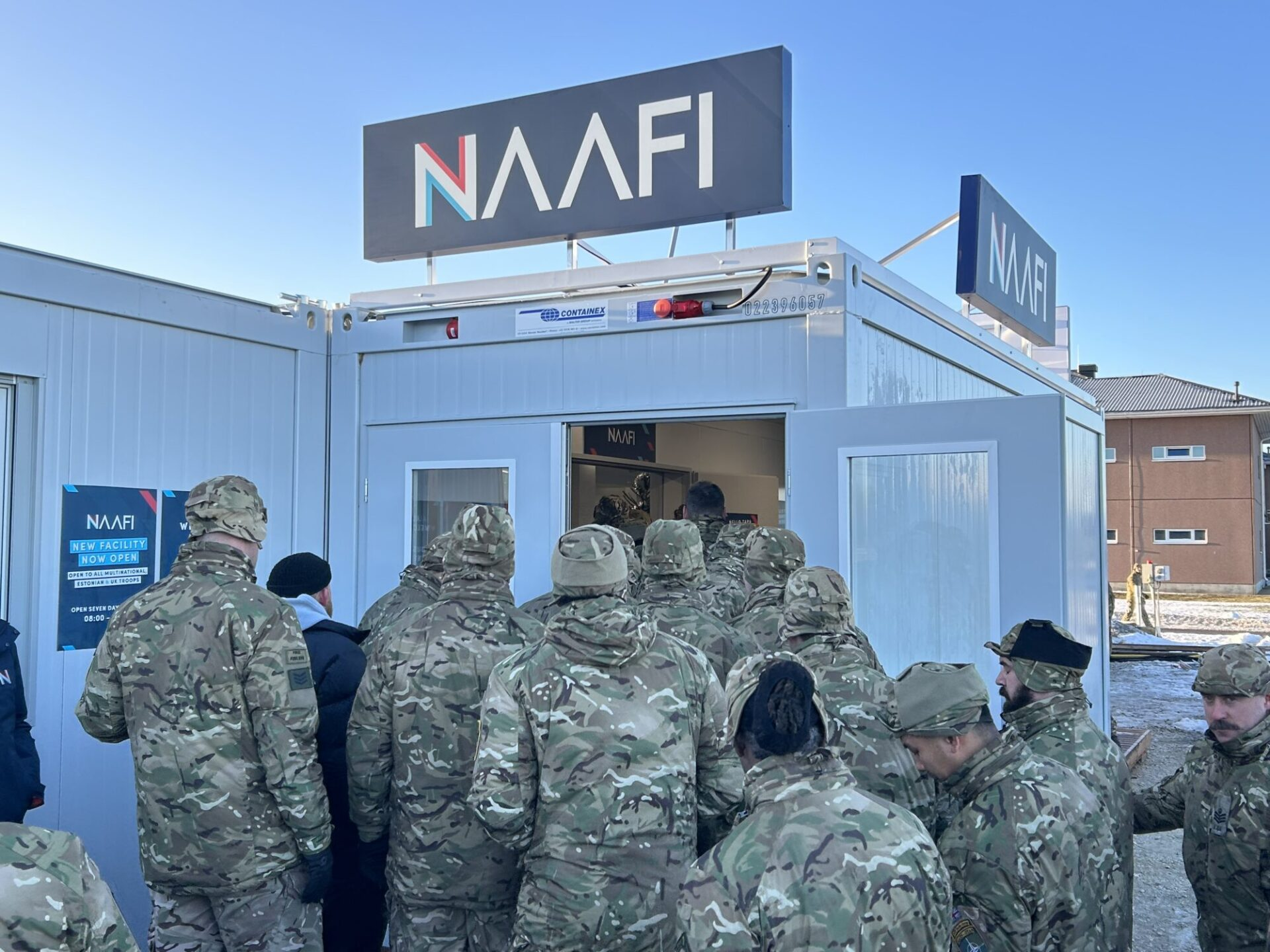
A new NAAFI retail and dining facility opens its doors in 2024

NAAFI continues its mission to provide a “taste of home” to British Armed Forces personnel and their families, both in the United Kingdom and at overseas locations. Its global operations extend to Ascension Island, Brunei, the Falkland Islands, Germany, Gibraltar and Royal Navy ships at sea.

The organisation offers a wide range of services, from its traditional retail outlets, cafés and leisure facilities to bars, laundry services and more recent additions such as security provision, interpreter services, waste management and full facilities management. NAAFI also operates its long-standing “NAAFI Wagons” mobile canteens that can be deployed rapidly to support troops in remote or operational environments.

A core element of its modern activities is the “Welfare Returns” mechanism and the NAAFI Fund, through which all surpluses are reinvested into Armed Forces communities. These funds are directed towards projects that enhance quality of life, reduce isolation and support community initiatives, including the refurbishment of recreational spaces, the purchase of sports equipment and the organisation of local events.

In 2024, NAAFI expanded onto the UK high street with cafes open to the public, including the NAAFI Bridge Deck Cafe in Fareham. It also operates the NAAFI Shop online, offering products such as its signature NAAFI Tea for purchase by the general public.

In 2025 NAAFI has announced considerable investment into facilities around the world including Brunei, Germany, USA and Diego Garcia.

== In popular culture ==
- The movie Carry On Sergeant, the first in the Carry On movies, is set in a National Service depot, many scenes are set in the base NAAFI.
- The 1950s BBC Radio comedy series The Goon Show often made reference to the NAAFI in scripts, mostly by Peter Sellers' character, Major Dennis Bloodnok. One episode was entitled "The Jet-Propelled Guided NAAFI". In the episode "Operation Christmas Duff", NAAFI is described as "an organisation working for the downfall of the British Army."
- The expression, "You're as dim as a NAAFI candle," (such as, stupid) is an update of the Great War veteran's slang "dim as a Toc H lamp".
- The expression to lie "like a cheap NAAFI watch" unfairly relies on the supposed shoddy workmanship of said equipment.
- In the "Camping In" episode of Are You Being Served?, when Mr Rumbold mentions he was in the Army Catering Corps, Mr Lucas incorrectly assumes Mr Rumbold actually worked in the NAAFI. He angrily exclaims, "You were in THE NAAFI?" Additionally, in season 1 episode 2 of Grace & Favour, Miss Brahms replies to a statement by Captain Peacock by saying, "He used to cycle down to the NAAFI to get his five Woodbines," after he mentions when he was in the army, he "did occasionally climb into the saddle".
- In chapter 16 of Lucky Jim, Dixon recalls that Margaret's face reminded him of a man who "had never been seen doing anything except sweeping out the NAAFI and wiping his nose on his sleeve."
- In J. Lee Thompson's Ice Cold in Alex, a character questions whether the gin is imported or NAAFI, raising concerns about the spirit's quality.
- The NAAFI is continuously mentioned throughout Spike Milligan's war memoirs. Every week his artillery unit is serviced by the NAAFI, who bring round the NAAFI rations of cigarettes, etc., as well as selling various other sundries such as shoelaces. Even when Milligan leaves the army, as he is part of an army entertainment troupe, he still gets issued with a NAAFI ration each week.
- In the sitcom Get Some In about RAF conscripts doing their National Service, in about every other episode there is a NAAFI canteen scene.
- Lovejoy season 3, episode 5, scene 3 has Tinker Dill proclaiming he, "Left his sense of adventure behind in the NAAFI in 1953".

In addition to being the name of the institute, NAAFI is also used in British service talk as a noun for a type of break, such as a "NAAFI break", which is a short break or tea break; or an insult to the character of another soldier, for example, "He's NAAFI!" (No Aim, Ambition and Fuck-all Interest). NAAFI has been humorously said to mean "Never 'Ave Any Fags In", referring to frequent shortages of cigarettes. A "NAAFI sandwich" consists of two pieces of bread spread with margarine placed together; that is, it is a "sandwich" with no filling.

== See also ==
- Army and Air Force Exchange Service
- Base Exchange
- Canadian Forces Exchange System
- CSD Pakistan
- Canteen Stores Department (India)
- Defense Commissary Agency
