= Milehouse =

Suburb of Plymouth, Devon

Coordinates: 50.386389°N 4.155833°W

- Location within Devon
- Unitary authority: Plymouth
- Ceremonial county: Devon
- Region: South West
- Country: England
- Sovereign state: United Kingdom
- Post town: PLYMOUTH
- Postcode district: PL2 3xx
- Dialling code: 01752
- Police: Devon and Cornwall
- Fire: Devon and Somerset
- Ambulance: South Western

Milehouse is a late Victorian and 1930s suburb of Plymouth. It is now notable for a substantial traffic junction, the vast depot base of the local city bus company, a Wetherspoons pub and an undertaker. Formerly it was famous for the site of Outland House, the large family home of Robert Falcon Scott, who led the tragic British expedition to the South Pole and died on the return journey.

The area borders Plymouth's huge Central Park and is a meeting point for supporters and police before and after local football games at adjacent Home Park, the ground of Plymouth Argyle football club. It is a reputable area with good facilities and is convenient to the city centre, the nightlife zones, the parkland and the main road in and out of town.

Milehouse has Primary care centre run by NHS.
