= Committee on Surplus Disposal =

The Committee on Surplus Disposal (CSD)—known formally as the Consultative Subcommittee on Surplus Disposal (CSSD)—is a subcommittee of the Committee on Commodity Problems of the UN Food and Agricultural Organization (FAO). The CSSD monitors international shipments of agricultural commodities provided as food aid in order to minimize any adverse effects of these shipments on commercial trade and agricultural production.
