= Canteen Stores Department (India) =

Indian military commissary chain

- Type: State-owned
- Industry: Retail
- Predecessors: Army Canteen Board (until 1927); Canteen Contractors' Syndicate (CCS) (1927-42); Directorate of Wholesale Trade and Indian Canteen Corps (1942-47)
- Founded: 1 January 1948
- Headquarters: Adelphi Building, Mumbai, Maharashtra, India
- Area served: India
- Key people: Maj. Gen. Satinder Singh (SM), (Chairman, Board of Administration & General Manager)
- Owner: Ministry of Defence
- Website: csdindia.gov.in

The Canteen Stores Department, (CSD), is a solely owned Government of India Enterprise under Ministry of Defence and has its depot in all major military bases operated by the Indian Armed Forces.

CSD are the most profitable retail chain in India, ahead of Future & Reliance Retail and sell a wide variety of products like household provisions, kitchen appliances, alcoholic drinks, cars, and sports equipment. Though originally meant exclusively for active and retired members of the Armed Forces personnel (defined as troops), it is slowly and steadily being expanded to include GREF, NCC Units at Group HQ level, TA units, CDA's staff, Indian Ordnance Factories, Embarkation HQs, civilians paid from defence estimates, civilians paid out of civil estimates, and Paramilitary forces under operational/administrative control of the Army civilian government employees. Generally, these goods are procured by CSD in bulk and sold at concessional rates (without taxes), compared with retail prices. CSD prices are low as the goods sold are exempt from taxes.

The development of these practices has always kept the objective of the organization in view. The department procures consumer goods and consumer-durable products in bulk directly from suppliers and positions them at 33 Area Depots (acting as wholesale depots), spread all over the country, for meeting the requirements of over 3500 URCs, which function as retail outlets. Many of the URCs are located in remote/inaccessible parts of the country.

== History ==
The Canteen Stores Department traces its origins to the British Raj, when the Army Canteen Board was established in India as an offshoot of the British Navy and Army Canteen Board. Although the Navy and Army Canteen Board was abolished in the UK in 1922 and was replaced by the Navy, Army and Air Force Institutes (NAAFI), its counterpart in India continued to function until 1927. The Army Canteen Board in India was established mainly to provide canteen facilities to British troops in India through grocery shops and bars run by canteen contractors.

The Army Canteen Board was liquidated in 1927 and replaced by the Canteen Contractors' Syndicate (CCS). It was floated in the form of a limited company, under government control, with its registration office at Karachi (present-day Pakistan). This company started off with a paid-up capital of ₹6 lakh (equivalent to ₹14 crore or US$1.5 million in 2026), and the shareholding was confined to the canteen contractors. The CCS functioned with reasonable efficiency until the commencement of World War II. However, after the heavy buildup of the British troops in India, the CCS could no longer cope with the situation. Therefore, on 1 July 1942, the Government of India made use of the specific provision in Services (India) under the Directorate of Wholesale Trade and Indian Canteen Corps to handle the retail trade in operational areas. Canteen suppliers poured in from abroad, and the organization functioned extremely well during the War. By 31 March 1946, it was not only able to pay back to the government the assignments of funds made available to it but could also function on its own trading capital. However, with the end of the war and the homeward movement of the British troops, the import facilities dwindled, and the turnover of the organization shrank. With the pulling out of troops from the operational areas, the Indian Canteen Corps was disbanded, and the staff retrenched.

This was closely followed by the independence and partition of the country, and the wartime organization gave birth to two Canteen Stores Departments, i.e., CSD (India) and CSD (Pakistan). The Pakistani CSD would later bifurcate further to form CSD (Bangladesh), after the independence of Bangladesh. The retail trade, however, reverted to the contractors. A board of Liquidation was formed to oversee the liquidation of assets of the wartime organization, which ceased to function on 31 December 1947. The Canteen Stores Department, the present organization, thus took birth on 1 January 1948 with a working capital of ₹48 lakh (equivalent to ₹59 crore or US$6.1 million in 2026) assigned to it from assets of its predecessor wartime organization. The Government of India had granted the organization a life of three years on an experimental basis. The situation was reviewed in 1950, and the department was accepted as a government undertaking on a permanent basis.

== CSD AFD Portal ==
on 8 Jan 2021, Defence Minister Rajnath Singh launched the Online Portal for CSD Canteen purchases. The platform allows 45 lakh beneficiaries, including armed forces personnel and retirees, to buy AFD-I(Against Firm Demand) items like Cars, Motorcycles, and electronic Appliances online from home. Singh praised the project's completion, aligning it with the Digital India vision. The ceremony, held in New Delhi, featured live streaming of deliveries in multiple cities, ensuring a faster and hassle-free experience. Notable attendees included Chief of Defence Staff General Bipin Rawat and other military leaders. The portal marks a significant step in providing efficient access to AFD-I items.

== CSD entitlements ==
=== Liquor Policy ===
Serving and retired personnel have monthly liquor quotas via CSD canteens. The number of bottles that can be issued varies by rank.

Category (Army, Air Force)	Max Bottles issuable per month (Serving personnel)	Max Bottles issuable per month (Ex-servicemen)
Commissioned officers	10	10
Junior commissioned officers (JCO)	7	6
Other Ranks (OR)	5	4
Note: A standard bottle typically refers to 750 mL of alcoholic beverage.

Category (Indian Navy)	Max Bottles issuable per month (Serving personnel)	Max Bottles issuable per month (Ex-servicemen)
Commissioned officers	20	10
Junior commissioned officers (JCO)	10	6
Other Ranks (OR)	7	4
Note: A standard bottle typically refers to 750 mL of hard liquor or three beer bottles of 650 mL.

==== Price and Subsidies ====
- Liquor in armed forces canteens is sold at subsidized rates compared to the civil market, due to complete or partial tax exemption depending on the state.
- Some states (eg, Karnataka) are considering raises in excise duty for liquor sold in military canteens to reduce discrepancy between civilian and military rates.

==== Legal restrictions and irregularities ====
- In states with liquor prohibition i.e., Bihar, Gujarat, Mizoram, Nagaland, and certain parts of Madhya Pradesh; army personnel are advised not to carry liquor while transiting through or while deployed into the state — even if they hold authorisation letters.
- However, naval personnel operating at sea or in coastal waters of the state are not subject to such restrictions, as they fall under Admiralty law within Exclusive Economic Zone (EEZ) rather than local, state, or central liquor prohibition laws.
- Cantonment areas, air force stations, and naval bases are considered to have different legal status, hence depending on the location, they are possibly completely exempt from local or federal laws.

==== Quota misuse ====
There have been past instances where units or naval warships overdrew liquor, more than the prescribed limit. These discrepancies are flagged in the annual audit report of the armed forces.

==== Restrictions ====
- There is a cap on premium liquor that can be availed by armed forces personnel, i.e., only 50% of the monthly quota can be utilised for premium brands; the remaining liquor must be of regular brands.

==== Navy Liquor Policy ====
Sailors and naval officers posted onboard ships and submarines, or in forward sea-going, often get extra liquor entitlements if continuously deployed at sea or on remote islands. This is meant to compensate for long periods away from the mainland and socializing through recreation.

- Foreign deployment: While on international deployments, naval personnel are authorised to procure duty-free liquor from approved naval establishments abroad.
- Mess supplies: Officers' mess and sailors' canteens often stock additional alcohol for such purposes and official functions, which does not count against the quota system.

=== Automobile entitlements ===
Personnel from the Indian Armed Forces can buy automobiles using a provision called AFD (Against Firm Demand), in this provision cars are classified as AFD-1 items, and motorcycles are classified as other AFD-1 items.

==== Car entitlement(s) ====
Earlier cars available for purchase were limited by rules regarding engine capacity, i.e. 2,500 cc for officers and 1,400 cc for lower ranks; and the car price (excluding taxes) was capped at ₹12 lakh (equivalent to ₹16 lakh or US$17,000 in 2026), along with the minimum service requirement of 5 years before being eligible for the purchase of a four-wheeler.

However, newer policies have completely removed the engine capacity limit and increased the price limit to the maximum of ₹25 lakh (US$26,000), and have allowed greater flexibility for JCO/OR(s) in the number of cars that can pe purchased across their lifetime.

Pay level	Category	Max car price (Combustion)	Max car price (EV)	Purchase frequency	Regulations	Lifetime limit
10 to 18	Commissioned officers	₹20 lakh (US$21,000)	₹25 lakh (US$26,000)	Once every 8 years	—N/a	—N/a
11 to 17	Defence civilians (officers)	₹20 lakh (US$21,000)	₹25 lakh (US$26,000)	Once every 8 years	—N/a	—N/a
6 to 9	Junior Commissioned Officers (JCO)	₹10 lakh (US$10,000)	₹15 lakh (US$16,000)	Once every 8 years	First car to be purchased as OR, second after promotion to JCO, and third after retirement	Maximum of 5 cars
3 to 5	Other ranks (OR)	₹8 lakh (US$8,300)	₹13 lakh (US$13,000)	15 years; for the second car	First car can be purchased after 5 years of service, and the second post-retirement	Maximum of 2 cars
Note: The value mentioned is excluding taxes (GST, etc.), so the actual purchase amount will differ.; Given the high automobile taxation in India, this provision enables military officers and defence civilians (Pay level 10+) to purchase vehicles with an on-road price up to ₹34 lakh (US$35,000) and ₹20 lakh (US$21,000) by JCOs.; Next of Kin (NoK) and widows can utilise the quota not used by the deceased personnel, if certain conditions are met.

==== Motorcycle entitlement(s) ====
- All personnel serving and retired from the Armed Forces, including defence civilians employees, their widows, and Next of Kin (NoK) are eligible to purchase two-wheelers from CSD.
- The gap between the purchase of two-wheelers shall be a minimum of four years from the date of purchase.
- The motorcycle purchased must be used for personal use, along with the undertaking signed that it shall not be sold in the civilian market until three years from the date of purchase.
- Only selected models from popular manufacturers (eg. Royal Enfield, Bajaj, Jawa, TVS, Hero, Yamaha, Honda, etc.) are available through CSD, based on existing dealership partnerships. Not all brands (eg. Triumph, Harley-Davidson, Indian, etc.) or variants are listed under the CSD scheme.

== See also ==
- Ministry of Defence (India)
