= CSD Pakistan =

Pakistani chain of retail stores

Canteen Stores Department
- Industry: Retail
- Founded: 1913; 113 years ago
- Headquarters: Rawalpindi, Pakistan
- Area served: Pakistan
- Products: Electronics; movies and music; Crockery and furniture; home improvement; clothing; footwear; jewelry; toys; health and beauty; pet supplies; sporting goods and fitness; auto; photo finishing; craft supplies; party supplies; grocery
- Website: csd.gov.pk

Canteen Stores Department, colloquially known as CSD, is a Pakistani state-owned discount retailer chain that operates a chain of supermarkets in cantonments and other military-administered areas across the country.

CSD is run by the Pakistan Army and is funded by the Ministry of Defence. Headquartered in Rawalpindi, it was formed after the partition of India in 1947 from the wartime canteen organisation of British India's armed forces.

== History ==
=== British India ===
In British India, canteens for British troops were run by private contractors. In September 1921, the colonial government announced plans for an Army Canteen Board (India), modelled on Britain's Navy and Army Canteen Board. Planned as an experiment, the board would first take charge of every canteen on the North-West Frontier, Baluchistan and Waziristan among them. Formed as a company in early 1922 under the Indian Companies Act 1913, the board managed regimental institutes and army hostels in several districts.

A commission of inquiry sitting at Simla advised in May 1926 that the board be dissolved. Heavy financial losses led to its liquidation in 1927. Its successor, the Canteen Contractors' Syndicate, was a limited company owned exclusively by canteen contractors. The government controlled the syndicate, whose registered office was in Karachi.

As British troop numbers in India grew during the Second World War, the syndicate was unable to meet demand. Canteen Services (India) was created in July 1942, when the government assumed control of the syndicate's operations. The new body was overseen by a board of control chaired by the Quartermaster-General in India, whose members included the Adjutant-General, the defence secretary and the military finance adviser. The government's Canteen Stores Department acted as wholesaler, buying stock in bulk and supplying it to the contractors who ran canteens in peace areas. In operational areas, canteens were run by an Indian Canteen Corps. The department was managed by a board of administration based in Bombay. The Royal Indian Navy set up canteen warehouses at its ports to distribute the bulk supplies it bought from the department.

=== Pakistan ===
The partition of India in 1947 led Canteen Services (India) to go into voluntary liquidation, and it was succeeded by two new bodies, the Canteen Stores Department (India) and the Canteen Stores Department (Pakistan).

The money due to Pakistan from the undivided department went straight to CSD rather than through the government's accounts. Of that money, 40 percent was meant for the Defence Welfare Fund. India initially only handed over 40 percent and still owed the remainder. During this period, CSD was financed wholly out of Pakistan's Defence Welfare Fund share, without any investment of government money.

CSD started a hire-purchase scheme for cars, motorcycles and household appliances in 1974. In 2008, a Ministry of Defence summary on the use of A-1 category defence land by CSD and the three armed services for commercial and welfare purposes was signed into effect. In September 2010, inspectors from the Pakistan Standards and Quality Control Authority found substandard and unregistered products, including CSD-branded cooking oil, at a CSD superstore in Karachi. The store's management closed its doors, briefly confining the inspectors and more than 50 customers inside.

In November 2021, Chief Justice Gulzar Ahmed criticised the conversion of CSD into open commercial department stores and declared the commercial activities unconstitutional.

== Operations ==
CSD's head office is in Rawalpindi Cantonment. It operates more than 100 stores, located in military garrisons and near armed forces housing and grouped into seven zones. The zones are based in Rawalpindi, Lahore, Multan, Peshawar, Quetta, Karachi and Abbottabad, each with its own depot. CSD buys directly from manufacturers of fast-moving consumer goods, using distributors only for commodities and fresh produce.
