= Paton (surname) =

Paton is a surname of Scottish origin. It was formed by adding an Old French suffix -on to the given name Pat, a short version of Patrick. Notable people with the surname include:

- Al Paton, musician from South Africa and Namibia
- Alan Paton (1903–1988), South African author and anti-apartheid activist
- Alex Paton, Scottish footballer
- Andrew Archibald Paton (1811–1874), British diplomat, orientalist, and author
- Andy Paton (1923–2014), Scottish football player and manager
- Angela Paton (1930–2016), American theatre, TV and film actress
- Angus Paton (1905–1999), British civil engineer from Jersey
- Ann Paton, Lady Paton (born 1952), Scottish advocate and judge
- Bartolome Jimenez Paton (1569–1640), Spanish humanist, rhetorician, grammarian and writer
- Bert Paton (born 1942), Scottish football player and manager
- Borys Paton (1918–2020), chairman of the National Academy of Sciences of Ukraine
- Charles Paton (1874–1970), English film actor
- Charlie Paton, Scottish polar adventurer
- Daniel Paton (1871–1957), Scottish footballer
- Danny Paton (1936–2011), Scottish footballer
- David Paton (disambiguation), multiple people
  - David Paton (born 1949), Scottish musician
  - David Paton (architect) (1801–1882), Scottish architect and builder
  - David Paton (artist), Scottish artist active between 1660 and 1700
  - David Paton (doctor) (1912–2008), medical officer on St Nazaire raid of World War II
  - David Paton (ophthalmologist) (born 1930), founder of Project Orbis
- Diarmid Noel Paton (1859–1928), Scottish physician and academic
- Elizabeth Paton (1760–1799), later Elizabeth Andrew of Lairgieside
- Eric Paton (born 1978), Scottish professional footballer
- Eris Paton (1928–2004), New Zealand cricketer
- Ernest Forrester Paton (1891–1970), Scottish medical missionary to Pune, Bombay
- Evgeny Paton (1870–1953), Ukrainian engineer
- Florence Paton (1891–1976), British Labour Party MP
- Frank Paton (1855–1909), English artist of the Victorian and Edwardian eras
- Frank H. L. Paton (1870–1938), Australian Presbyterian missionary and minister
- Gavin Paton, Army Sergeant Major of the British Army
- George Paton (disambiguation), multiple people
  - George Henry Tatham Paton (1895–1917), Scottish recipient of the Victoria Cross
  - George Paton (cricketer) (1879–1950), Australian cricketer
  - George Paton (footballer), Scottish football player during the 1940s and 1950s
  - George Whitecross Paton (1902–1985), vice chancellor of Melbourne University
- Graeme Paton, British journalist, and Transport Correspondent for The Times
- Harry Paton (rugby union) (1881–1964), New Zealand rugby player, administrator and referee
- Herbert James Paton (1887–1969), Scottish philosopher
- Hugh Paton (1852–1941), Scottish business owner in Montreal
- Ian Paton (disambiguation), multiple people
  - Ian Paton (footballer) (born 1957), Australian rules footballer
  - Ian Paton (politician), Canadian politician
  - Ian Paton (bishop) (born 1957), Anglican bishop
- James Paton (disambiguation), multiple people
  - James Alexander Paton (1884–1946), newspaper owner and political figure in British Columbia
  - James Paton (bishop) (1522–1596), 16th-century Scottish cleric from Ballilisk, Kinross
  - James Paton (mayor) (1853–1953), Scots-born merchant in Prince Edward Island, Canada
  - James Paton (seaman) (1869–1917), Scots-born Antarctic expeditioner
  - James Paton (sport shooter) (born 1957), sport shooter from Canada
- Jamie Paton, Australian international football player
- Jean Paton (born 1929), British bryologist
- Joan Paton (1916–2000), Australian ornithologist
- Joe Paton (1878–1952), Australian rules footballer
- John Paton (disambiguation), multiple people
  - John Paton (British politician) (1886–1976), Labour MP for Norwich
  - John Paton (general) (1867–1943), Australian general in World War I
  - John Paton (VC) (1833–1914), Scottish recipient of the Victoria Cross
  - John Brown Paton (1830–1911), English theologian
  - John Gibson Paton (1824–1907), Scottish missionary to Vanuatu
  - Johnny Paton (1923–2015), Scottish professional football player, manager, coach
  - Jonathan Paton (born 1971), politician and intelligence officer in the U.S. Army Reserve in Iraq
- Joseph Noel Paton (1821–1901), Scottish artist
- Lewis B. Paton (1864–1932), American biblical scholar
- Margaret Paton (1841-1905), Scottish missionary to New Hebrides
- Mary Ann Paton (1802–1864), Scottish vocalist
- Mary Paton, founder of Australian Breastfeeding Association
- Michael Paton (disambiguation), multiple people
  - Michael Paton (born 1989), Scottish professional footballer
  - Michael Paton (Dumbarton footballer), Scottish footballer of the 1880s
  - Michael Paton (priest), Anglican priest and author in the 20th century
- Norman Paton, Professor in the School of Computer Science at the University of Manchester
- Paul Paton (born 1987), professional footballer
- Raffaëla Paton (born 1983), Dutch singer
- Richard Paton (1717–1791), British marine painter
- Robert Paton (disambiguation), multiple people
  - Robert Paton (chemist), Harrison-Meldola Memorial Prize winner
  - Robert Paton (footballer) (1854–1905), Scottish footballer
  - Robert Paton (politician) (1839–1917), Ontario farmer, merchant and political figure
  - Robert Thomson Paton (1856–1929), Australian public health official
- Roy Paton (1882–1947), Australian politician
- Sarah Paton (born 1986), Australian long-distance swimmer
- Siobhan Paton, OAM (born 1983), Australian Paralympic swimmer
- Stewart Paton (1865–1942), American psychiatrist
- Stuart Paton (1883–1944), British director, screenwriter and actor of the silent era
- Taine Paton (born 1989), South African field hockey player
- Tam Paton (1938–2009), Scottish manager of the Bay City Rollers
- Tom Paton (ice hockey) (1854–1909), Canadian ice hockey player
- Wade Paton (born 1986), South African field hockey player
- Waller Hugh Paton (1828–1895), Scottish landscape artist
- Walter Paton (1853–1937), English barrister who wrote guides to emigration to the British colonies
- William Paton (disambiguation), multiple people
  - William Andrew Paton (1889–1991), American accountancy scholar
  - William D. M. Paton (1917–1993), British pharmacologist
  - William J. Paton (died 2002), Scottish footballer
  - William Roger Paton (1857–1921), author and translator of ancient Greek texts and poets
- Willie Paton (1925–2005), Scottish footballer

== See also ==
- Paton (disambiguation)
- Paton (given name)
- Patons and Baldwins, a former British manufacturer of knitting yarn
- Patten (disambiguation)
- Patton (disambiguation)
