= List of United Kingdom locations: Par-Pay =

The United Kingdom

This is part of the list of United Kingdom locations: a gazetteer of place names in the United Kingdom showing each place's locality and geographical coordinates.

== Par ==
Location	Locality	Coordinates (links to map & photo sources)	OS grid reference
Par	Cornwall	50.34°N 04.71°W	SX0753
Paradise	Gloucestershire	51.79°N 02.18°W	SO8711
Paradise Green	Herefordshire	52.11°N 02.70°W	SO5247
Paramoor	Cornwall	50.30°N 04.85°W	SW9749
Paramour Street	Kent	51.30°N 01.26°E	TR2861
Parbold	Lancashire	53.59°N 02.77°W	SD4911
Parbroath	Fife	56.34°N 03.10°W	NO3217
Parbrook	Somerset	51.12°N 02.63°W	ST5636
Parbrook	West Sussex	51.01°N 00.46°W	TQ0825
Parc	Gwynedd	52.88°N 03.68°W	SH8733
Parc Erissey	Cornwall	50.25°N 05.24°W	SW6944
Parc-hendy	Swansea	51.63°N 04.11°W	SS5495
Parchey	Somerset	51.12°N 02.94°W	ST3437
Parciau	Isle of Anglesey	53.33°N 04.26°W	SH4984
Parcllyn	Ceredigion	52.12°N 04.57°W	SN2451
Parc Mawr	Caerphilly	51.61°N 03.28°W	ST1191
Parc-Seymour	City of Newport	51.61°N 02.86°W	ST4091
Pardown	Hampshire	51.23°N 01.18°W	SU5749
Pardshaw	Cumbria	54.60°N 03.41°W	NY0924
Pardshaw Hall	Cumbria	54.61°N 03.39°W	NY1025
Parham	Suffolk	52.19°N 01.36°E	TM3060
Park	Cornwall	50.49°N 04.77°W	SX0370
Park	Devon	50.77°N 03.66°W	SX8399
Park	Somerset	51.06°N 02.78°W	ST4530
Park	Swindon	51.54°N 01.75°W	SU1783
Park	Western Isles	58.01°N 06.54°W	NB315119
Park Barn	Surrey	51.24°N 00.61°W	SU9750
Park Bernisdale	Highland	57.47°N 06.33°W	NG4051
Park Bottom	Cornwall	50.23°N 05.28°W	SW6642
Park Bridge	Tameside	53.51°N 02.09°W	SD9402
Park Broom	Cumbria	54.91°N 02.89°W	NY4358
Park Close	Lancashire	53.89°N 02.18°W	SD8844
Park Corner	Bath and North East Somerset	51.32°N 02.31°W	ST7859
Park Corner (Slinfold)	East Sussex	51.10°N 00.18°E	TQ5336
Park Corner (Laughton)	East Sussex	50.90°N 00.14°E	TQ5114
Park Corner	Oxfordshire	51.58°N 01.00°W	SU6988
Parkend	Gloucestershire	51.76°N 02.56°W	SO6108
Park End	Bedfordshire	52.16°N 00.55°W	SP9953
Park End	Cambridgeshire	52.22°N 00.26°E	TL5561
Park End	Middlesbrough	54.54°N 01.19°W	NZ5217
Park End	Northumberland	55.06°N 02.20°W	NY8775
Park End	Somerset	51.09°N 03.17°W	ST1833
Park End	South Ayrshire	55.10°N 05.01°W	NX0883
Park End	Staffordshire	53.05°N 02.32°W	SJ7851
Park End	Worcestershire	52.35°N 02.35°W	SO7673
Parkengear	Cornwall	50.28°N 04.94°W	SW9047
Parker's Corner	Berkshire	51.43°N 01.10°W	SU6271
Parker's Green	Hertfordshire	51.90°N 00.08°W	TL3225
Parker's Green	Kent	51.20°N 00.30°E	TQ6148
Parkeston	Essex	51.94°N 01.24°E	TM2332
Parkfield	Cornwall	50.47°N 04.38°W	SX3167
Parkfield	South Gloucestershire	51.49°N 02.44°W	ST6977
Parkfield	Wolverhampton	52.56°N 02.11°W	SO9296
Parkfoot	Falkirk	55.98°N 03.92°W	NS8079
Parkgate (Wirral)	Cheshire	53.29°N 03.09°W	SJ2778
Parkgate (Cheshire East)	Cheshire	53.25°N 02.33°W	SJ7873
Parkgate	Cumbria	54.80°N 03.23°W	NY2146
Parkgate	Dumfries and Galloway	55.16°N 03.55°W	NY0187
Parkgate	Essex	51.82°N 00.40°E	TL6617
Parkgate	Kent	51.07°N 00.63°E	TQ8534
Parkgate	Rotherham	53.45°N 01.35°W	SK4395
Parkgate	Surrey	51.17°N 00.28°W	TQ2043
Park Gate	Dorset	50.86°N 02.37°W	ST7407
Park Gate	Hampshire	50.86°N 01.27°W	SU5108
Park Gate	Kent	51.16°N 01.10°E	TR1745
Park Gate	Kirklees	53.59°N 01.65°W	SE2311
Park Gate	Suffolk	52.17°N 00.54°E	TL7456
Park Gate	Worcestershire	52.33°N 02.10°W	SO9371
Park Green	Essex	51.93°N 00.12°E	TL4628
Park Hall	Shropshire	52.87°N 03.04°W	SJ3031
Parkhall	West Dunbartonshire	55.91°N 04.41°W	NS4972
Parkham	Devon	50.96°N 04.30°W	SS3821
Parkham Ash	Devon	50.95°N 04.33°W	SS3620
Parkhead	Aberdeenshire	57.08°N 02.24°W	NO8599
Parkhead	Cumbria	54.75°N 03.04°W	NY3340
Parkhead	City of Glasgow	55.84°N 04.20°W	NS6263
Parkhead	Sheffield	53.34°N 01.52°W	SK3283
Park Head	Cornwall	50.49°N 05.03°W	SW849708
Park Head	Cumbria	54.76°N 02.65°W	NY5841
Park Head	Derbyshire	53.08°N 01.46°W	SK3654
Park Head	Kirklees	53.56°N 01.71°W	SE1908
Park Hill	Gloucestershire	51.68°N 02.63°W	ST5699
Park Hill	Kent	51.04°N 00.78°E	TQ9531
Park Hill	Sheffield	53.37°N 01.46°W	SK3687
Park Hill	St Helens	53.51°N 02.81°W	SD4602
Parkhill	Fife	56.34°N 03.23°W	NO2418
Parkhill	Inverclyde	55.92°N 04.64°W	NS3573
Parkhouse	Monmouthshire	51.71°N 02.73°W	SO4902
Parkhouse Green	Derbyshire	53.16°N 01.38°W	SK4163
Parkhurst	Isle of Wight	50.70°N 01.30°W	SZ4990
Parklands	Leeds	53.81°N 01.46°W	SE3535
Park Lane	Staffordshire	52.65°N 02.17°W	SJ8806
Park Lane	Wrexham	52.94°N 02.86°W	SJ4239
Park Langley	Bromley	51.38°N 00.01°W	TQ3867
Park Mains	Renfrewshire	55.89°N 04.46°W	NS4670
Parkmill	Swansea	51.58°N 04.10°W	SS5489
Park Mill	Kirklees	53.59°N 01.62°W	SE2511
Parkneuk	Fife	56.07°N 03.47°W	NT0888
Park Royal	Ealing	51.52°N 00.28°W	TQ1982
Parks / Na Pàirceannan	Western Isles	57.06°N 07.29°W	NF7910
Parkside	Barrow-in-Furness, Cumbria	54.52°N 03.50°W	NY0315
Parkside	Bedfordshire	51.90°N 00.51°W	TL0224
Parkside	County Durham	54.82°N 01.34°W	NZ4248
Parkside	Cumbria	54.52°N 03.50°W	NY0315
Parkside	North Lanarkshire	55.80°N 03.91°W	NS8058
Parkside	Staffordshire	52.82°N 02.13°W	SJ9125
Parkside	Wrexham	53.08°N 02.92°W	SJ3855
Parkstone	Poole	50.71°N 01.95°W	SZ0391
Park Street	Hertfordshire	51.72°N 00.35°W	TL1404
Park Street	West Sussex	51.06°N 00.41°W	TQ1131
Park Village	Northumberland	54.94°N 02.50°W	NY6861
Park Village	Wolverhampton	52.59°N 02.11°W	SJ9200
Park Villas	Leeds	53.83°N 01.51°W	SE3238
Parkway	Herefordshire	52.01°N 02.42°W	SO7135
Parkway	Somerset	50.98°N 02.58°W	ST5921
Park Wood (Maidstone)	Kent	51.23°N 00.54°E	TQ7851
Park Wood (Medway)	Kent	51.33°N 00.58°E	TQ8063
Parkwood Springs	Sheffield	53.39°N 01.49°W	SK3489
Parley Green	Dorset	50.77°N 01.87°W	SZ0997
Parliament Heath	Suffolk	52.05°N 00.85°E	TL9643
Parlington	Leeds	53.81°N 01.36°W	SE4235
Parmoor	Buckinghamshire	51.59°N 00.86°W	SU7989
Parnacott	Devon	50.81°N 04.40°W	SS3105
Parney Heath	Essex	51.94°N 00.96°E	TM0431
Parr	St Helens	53.44°N 02.70°W	SJ5394
Parracombe	Devon	51.17°N 03.91°W	SS6644
Parr Brow	Wigan	53.50°N 02.43°W	SD7101
Parrog	Pembrokeshire	52.01°N 04.85°W	SN0439
Parslow's Hillock	Buckinghamshire	51.70°N 00.81°W	SP8201
Parsonage Green	Essex	51.76°N 00.46°E	TL7010
Parsonby	Cumbria	54.73°N 03.33°W	NY1438
Parson Cross	Sheffield	53.42°N 01.47°W	SK3592
Parson Drove	Cambridgeshire	52.65°N 00.02°E	TF3708
Parsons Green	Hammersmith and Fulham	51.46°N 00.20°W	TQ2576
Parson's Heath	Essex	51.89°N 00.92°E	TM0126
Partick	City of Glasgow	55.86°N 04.31°W	NS5566
Partington	Trafford	53.41°N 02.43°W	SJ7191
Partney	Lincolnshire	53.19°N 00.10°E	TF4168
Parton (Copeland)	Cumbria	54.56°N 03.59°W	NX9720
Parton (Thursby)	Cumbria	54.83°N 03.13°W	NY2750
Parton	Dumfries and Galloway	55.00°N 04.05°W	NX6970
Parton	Herefordshire	52.12°N 03.00°W	SO3148
Partridge Green	West Sussex	50.95°N 00.30°W	TQ1919
Partrishow	Powys	51.89°N 03.06°W	SO2722
Parwich	Derbyshire	53.09°N 01.72°W	SK1854

== Pas ==
Location	Locality	Coordinates (links to map & photo sources)	OS grid reference
Pasford	Staffordshire	52.58°N 02.29°W	SO8099
Passenham	Northamptonshire	52.04°N 00.86°W	SP7839
Passfield	Hampshire	51.09°N 00.83°W	SU8234
Passingford Bridge	Essex	51.65°N 00.16°E	TQ5097
Passmores	Essex	51.75°N 00.08°E	TL4408
Paston	Cambridgeshire	52.60°N 00.24°W	TF1902
Paston	Norfolk	52.85°N 01.44°E	TG3234
Paston Green	Norfolk	52.85°N 01.42°E	TG3134
Pasturefields	Staffordshire	52.82°N 02.01°W	SJ9925

== Pat ==
Location	Locality	Coordinates (links to map & photo sources)	OS grid reference
Patchacott	Devon	50.76°N 04.17°W	SX4798
Patcham	Brighton and Hove	50.85°N 00.15°W	TQ3008
Patchetts Green	Hertfordshire	51.66°N 00.35°W	TQ1497
Patching	West Sussex	50.84°N 00.46°W	TQ0806
Patchole	Devon	51.16°N 03.98°W	SS6142
Patchway	South Gloucestershire	51.53°N 02.57°W	ST6082
Pategill	Cumbria	54.65°N 02.74°W	NY5229
Pateley Bridge	North Yorkshire	54.08°N 01.77°W	SE1565
Paternoster Heath	Essex	51.80°N 00.76°E	TL9115
Pathe	Somerset	51.06°N 02.90°W	ST3730
Pather	North Lanarkshire	55.76°N 03.93°W	NS7954
Pathfinder Village	Devon	50.72°N 03.64°W	SX8493
Pathhead	East Ayrshire	55.40°N 04.19°W	NS6114
Pathhead	Fife	56.11°N 03.15°W	NT2892
Pathhead	Midlothian	55.86°N 02.97°W	NT3964
Path Head	Gateshead	54.96°N 01.73°W	NZ1763
Pathlow	Warwickshire	52.22°N 01.75°W	SP1758
Path of Condie	Perth and Kinross	56.28°N 03.50°W	NO0711
Pathstruie	Perth and Kinross	56.29°N 03.50°W	NO0712
Patient End	Hertfordshire	51.92°N 00.06°E	TL4227
Patmore Heath	Hertfordshire	51.90°N 00.09°E	TL4425
Patna	East Ayrshire	55.35°N 04.51°W	NS4110
Patney	Wiltshire	51.32°N 01.90°W	SU0758
Patrick	Isle of Man	54.19°N 04.69°W	SC2481
Patrick Brompton	North Yorkshire	54.30°N 01.66°W	SE2290
Patricroft	Salford	53.47°N 02.36°W	SJ7698
Patrington	East Riding of Yorkshire	53.67°N 00.01°W	TA3122
Patrington Haven	East Riding of Yorkshire	53.66°N 00.03°W	TA3021
Patrixbourne	Kent	51.25°N 01.12°E	TR1855
Patsford	Devon	51.13°N 04.10°W	SS5339
Patterdale	Cumbria	54.52°N 02.94°W	NY3915
Pattiesmuir	Fife	56.03°N 03.46°W	NT0983
Pattingham	Staffordshire	52.58°N 02.26°W	SO8299
Pattishall	Northamptonshire	52.18°N 01.02°W	SP6754
Pattiswick	Essex	51.88°N 00.62°E	TL8124
Patton	Shropshire	52.54°N 02.62°W	SO5894
Patton Bridge	Cumbria	54.36°N 02.69°W	SD5597

== Pau ==
Location	Locality	Coordinates (links to map & photo sources)	OS grid reference
Paul	Cornwall	50.08°N 05.55°W	SW4627
Paulerspury	Northamptonshire	52.09°N 00.96°W	SP7145
Paull	East Riding of Yorkshire	53.71°N 00.24°W	TA1626
Paul's Green	Cornwall	50.14°N 05.36°W	SW6033
Paulsgrove	City of Portsmouth	50.85°N 01.10°W	SU6306
Paulton	Bath and North East Somerset	51.30°N 02.50°W	ST6556
Paulville	West Lothian	55.89°N 03.64°W	NS9768

== Pav ==
Location	Locality	Coordinates (links to map & photo sources)	OS grid reference
Pave Lane	Shropshire	52.74°N 02.37°W	SJ7516
Pavenham	Bedfordshire	52.18°N 00.55°W	SP9955

== Paw ==
Location	Locality	Coordinates (links to map & photo sources)	OS grid reference
Pawlett	Somerset	51.17°N 03.01°W	ST2942
Pawlett Hill	Somerset	51.18°N 03.01°W	ST2943
Pawston	Northumberland	55.58°N 02.23°W	NT8532

== Pax ==
Location	Locality	Coordinates (links to map & photo sources)	OS grid reference
Paxford	Gloucestershire	52.03°N 01.73°W	SP1837
Paxton	Scottish Borders	55.77°N 02.11°W	NT9353

== Pay ==
Location	Locality	Coordinates (links to map & photo sources)	OS grid reference
Payden Street	Kent	51.25°N 00.75°E	TQ9254
Payhembury	Devon	50.80°N 03.30°W	ST0801
Paynes Green	Surrey	51.12°N 00.37°W	TQ1437
Paynter's Cross	Cornwall	50.45°N 04.26°W	SX3964
Paynter's Lane End	Cornwall	50.24°N 05.26°W	SW6743
Paythorne	Lancashire	53.95°N 02.26°W	SD8351
Payton	Somerset	50.97°N 03.26°W	ST1120
