= Patton (disambiguation) =

George S. Patton (1885–1945) was a U.S. Army general during World War II.

Patton may also refer to:

== Places ==
=== United States ===
- Patton, Alabama, a former unincorporated community
- Patton, California, an unincorporated community
- Patton Township, Ford County, Illinois
- Patton, Indiana, an unincorporated town
- Patton, Missouri, an unincorporated community
- Patton, Pennsylvania, a borough
  - Patton Historic District
- Patton Island (disambiguation)
- Patton Township, Centre County, Pennsylvania
- Patton, West Virginia, an unincorporated community
- Patton Park (Detroit)
- Patton Village, California, a census-designated place
- Patton Village, Texas, a city

=== England ===
- Patton, Cumbria, a former parish, now in Whinfell
- Patton, Shropshire, a hamlet in Shropshire
- Patton (hundred), a former hundred of Shropshire
- Patton Bridge, Cumbria, England

=== Antarctica ===
- Patton Glacier, Ellsworth Mountains, Marie Byrd Land
- Patton Bluff, Marie Byrd Land

=== Elsewhere ===
- Patton Seamount, an underwater volcano in the Gulf of Alaska

== Military ==
- Patton tank, various U.S. Army tanks
- Model 1913 Cavalry Saber or Patton saber
- Patton's Additional Continental Regiment, an American Revolutionary War unit

== Ships ==
- USC&GS Patton (ASV-80), a survey ship in United States Coast and Geodetic Survey service from 1941 to 1967
- USS Patton or HMS Sarawak, a patrol frigate

== Other uses ==
- Patton (film), a 1970 film about General George S. Patton
- Patton (surname), a surname (and list of people with the name)
- Patton State Hospital, psychiatric hospital in San Bernardino, California
- Patton Building, Springfield, Massachusetts
- Patton Bridge (Auburn, Washington)
- Patton Motor Company, a street car manufacturer in Chicago
- E. L. Patton Yukon River Bridge, a bridge in Alaska
- Patton Drilvosky a character from the Cartoon Network animated series Codename: Kids Next Door

== See also ==
- Paton (disambiguation)
- Patten (disambiguation)
- Patton Oswalt (born 1969), American comedian and actor
