= History of Kirkcaldy =

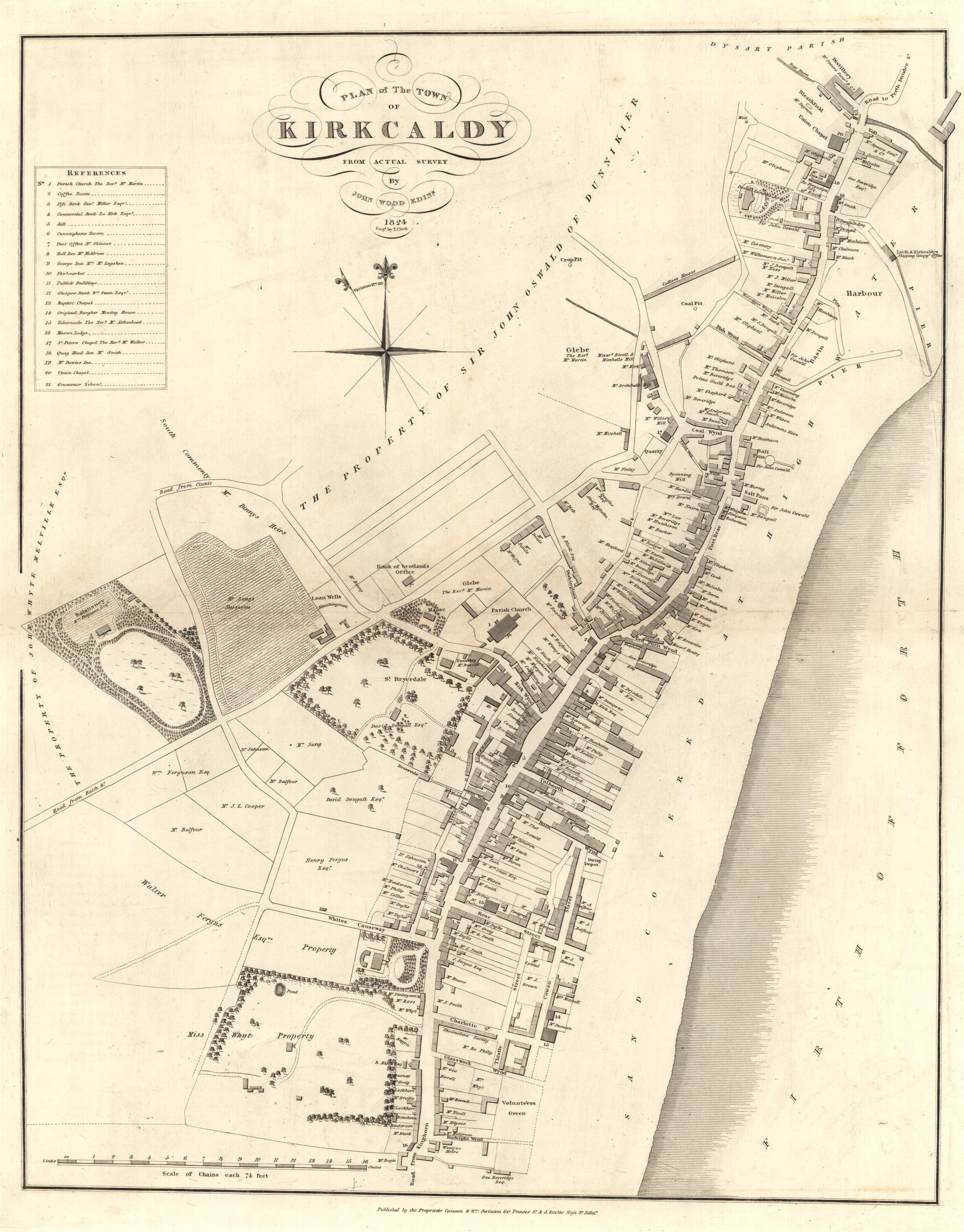
Royal Burgh of Kirkcaldy Map from 1824 displaying the length of "the lang toun"

Kirkcaldy (Scottish Gaelic: Cathair Chaladinn) is a former royal burgh and town. Known as one of Scotland's "most ancient burghs", the area surrounding the modern town has a history dating as far back as between 2500 BC and 500 BC as a possible funerary landscape.

The town began as a burgh under the control of Dunfermline Abbey. A harbour built around the East Burn gradually led to the growth of the town surrounding the harbour itself, High Street and Tiel burn following the demand of trade with the Baltic. Early industries which soon prospered included the production of textiles, nailmaking and salt panning. The Industrial Revolution of the 19th and 20th centuries proved to be the most prosperous period for the town, seeing the introduction of linoleum. Originally developed in the town as floorcloth, this was quickly dominated by Michael Nairn & Co but did not become popular on a worldwide scale until the beginning of the 20th century.

== Origin and name ==
The name Kirkcaldy means "place of the hard fort", or "place of Caled's fort". It is derived from the Pictish caer meaning "fort", caled, which is Pictish "hard" or a personal name Caled, and –in, a suffix meaning "place of". Caled may describe the fort itself or be an epithet for a local "hard" ruler. An interpretation of the last element as din (again "fort" but this time from Gaelic) rather than –in is incorrect. The Old Statistical Account states a derivation from culdee, which has been repeated in later publications but is also incorrect.

The earliest written form of the name, from the Charters of David I in 1128, is as the shire of Kircalethyn; with subsequent forms including Kircaldin, Kirkaladinit, Kerkalethin; and the earliest close approximation to the current name, as Kircaldy, appearing in 1250. Kirkcaldy has long been nicknamed the "Lang Toun" (Scots for "long town") in reference to the (0.9 miles later 4 miles) main street of the early town, depicted so on maps as early as the 16th and 17th centuries.

The area overlooking the curving, sandy bay was used as a funerary landscape, with the discovery of eleven Bronze Age cist burials from the period between 2500 BC and 500 BC.

== Early history ==
The theory that the Battle of Raith was fought in the vicinity of the town in 596 AD no longer enjoys support. The Angles were said to have fought an alliance of Scots, Picts and Britons led by King Áedán mac Gabráin of Dál Riata. Towards the end of the 11th century the Scottish king Malcolm II purchased the shire of Kirkaladunt from the crown lords of Fife, to be given to the monks of Dunfermline Abbey as a means of aiding the funding of their newly built church. This saw residents pay annual revenues.

Two charters for what became known as the "schyre of Kircalethin" and "schire of Kirkcaladinit" were devised in 1128 and 1130 by David I on behalf of his father, but the location of the town and shire was not indicated. A reference to Kirkcaldy in 1182, is the only indication in the 12th century that it was regarded as a town. In 1304 the abbot of Dunfermline requested permission from King Edward I of England (Scotland being under occupation in this period) to hold a weekly market and annual fair in this "most ancient of burghs". The latter is the basis of the modern Links Market. Edward I of England simply referred to the town as a "manor". Burgh of barony status was granted by Robert I between 1315 and 1328, under the control of the abbey. The town, for the first time, had the right to trade with the Low Countries, the Baltic states, England and Northern France. The late 14th century saw David II request a regality charter for Kirkcaldy and nearby hinterland from Dunfermline Abbey for trading purposes within the boundary. By the middle of the 15th century, the town gained independence from the abbey, with the ability to deal with administrative issues and fiscal policies from the passing of feu-ferme status.

== Growth and development ==
Kirkcaldy, unlike most Scottish towns, had no surrounding defensive stone wall. The town, instead, relied on the sea acting as protection, which could still have left the town vulnerable to attack. The construction of Ravenscraig Castle lowered the vulnerability, accompanied by small walls or "heid dykes" built on rigs to the west of the High Street. The majority of the dykes contained small gates for the benefit of the town crofts and burgesses, who were responsible for their protection and maintenance. Three main gates became the entry points of the burgh, situated at the East Port, West Port and near the Old Kirk on Kirk Wynd.

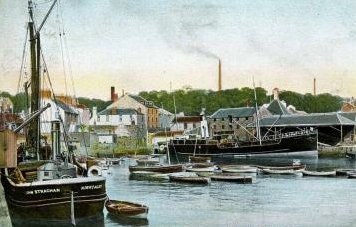
Kirkcaldy Harbour by the 18th century

Kirkcaldy harbour was at a sheltered cove round the East Burn, giving easy accessibility for boats. By the early 16th century the vessels of the harbour were engaging in trade with the Baltic, later dealing with the import of grain in 1618 and continental beer in 1625. A shipbuilding trade also existed on the site until this was phased out temporarily in 1645. The success led to the growth of the burgh, surrounding the harbour, main street and Tiel (West) burn, commented on by Thomas Carlyle. During his stay he described the shore as being "a mile of the smoothest sand, with one long wave coming on gently, steadily, and breaking into a gradual explosion beautifully sounding, and advancing ran from the South to the North, from the West Burn to Kirkcaldy Harbour, a favourite scene, beautiful to me still in the faraway".

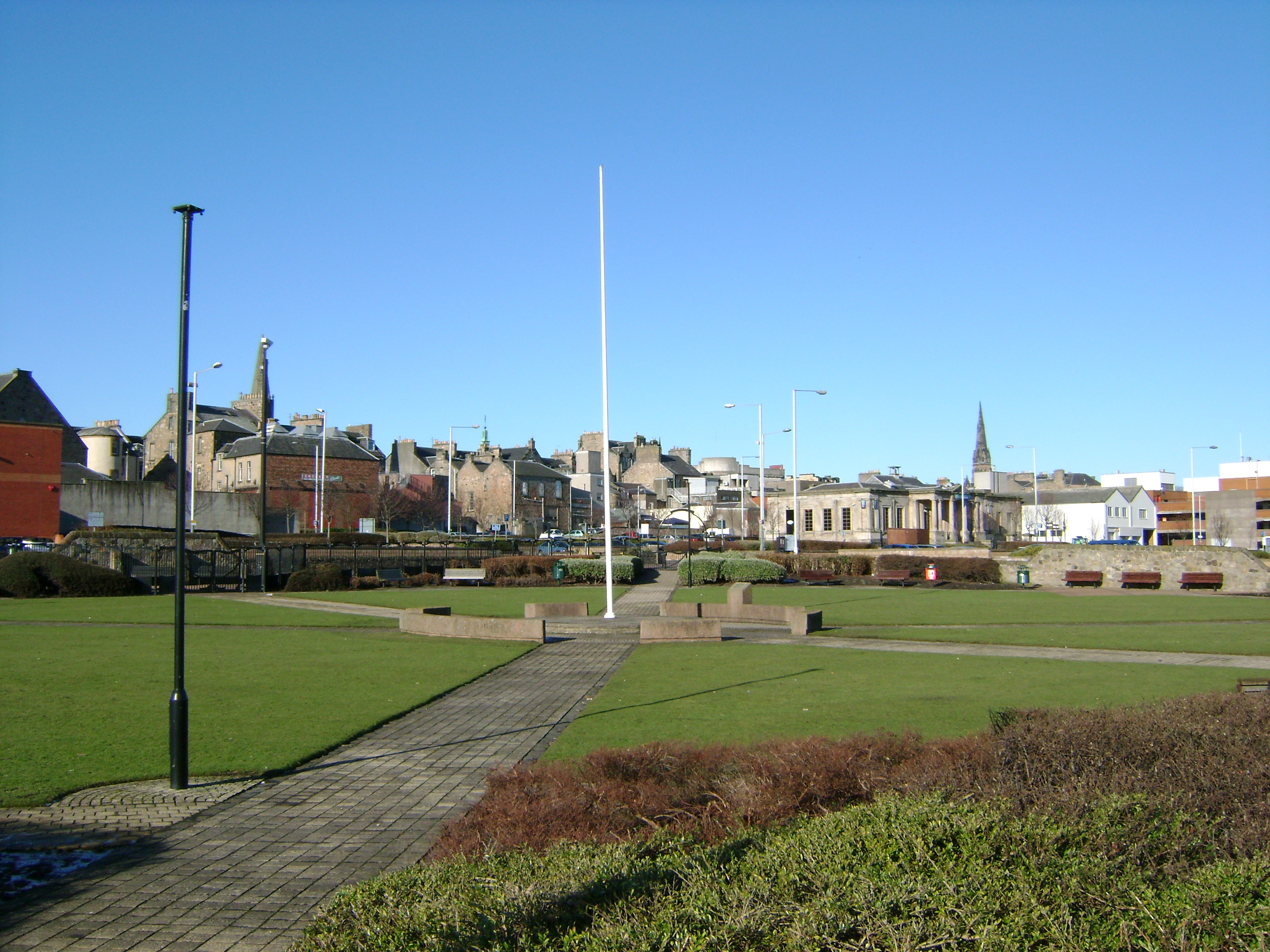
the remains of the common moor, now known as Volunteers' Green

Kirkcaldy joined the Convention of Royal Burghs in 1574. Charles II renewed Kirkcaldy's royal burgh status in 1644, leaving nine acres of land to the town suitable "bleaching of linen, drying of clothes and for recreation in perpetuity".

Local support for the Covenanting War (1644–65) led to the death of over 250 men. Later in the civil wars, during the mid–17th century, Oliver Cromwell's troops came to the town to seek riches and nearly destroyed the town. The treasure was eventually found by Cromwell in Dundee, to where it had been moved to from the burgh for "safe-keeping". The burgh was also affected by the Jacobite rebellions, with the town invaded in 1715 and again in 1745–46.

The town became a home for leather making, a brick and tile works, a cotton spinning mill and the first power spinning mill and linen factories in Fife. The shipbuilding industry was also resurrected which, by the end of the century, had built 26 square riggers, one sloop and two ferries. Construction of a turnpike road from the Pettycur ferry to Cupar and beyond was submitted in 1790 which helped to strengthen Kirkcaldy's position in Fife.

== Industrial Revolution ==
As Kirkcaldy entered into the 19th century, the arrival of the Kirkcaldy and District Railway, later to become part of the North British Railway, saw the town develop into the industrial heart of Fife—reviving the use of Kirkcaldy port, which had a severe setback during the mid–17th century. The harbour was catering for the growing trade of imports of flax, timber and hemp and exports of coal, salt and linen cloth, when a decision was made to build a new wet dock and pier from 1843 to 1846. The subsequent demands for linoleum and coal led to a further extension from 1906 to 1908 in the form of an inner dock.

Kirkcaldy population increases
Year	Population
1891	27,155
1911	45,410
1931	46,019
1951	50,519
1961	53,750

Kirkcaldy became a centre for iron founding and linen manufacturing—specialising in coarser material (i.e. sailcloth). Although when the market for sail cloth started to dip, Michael Nairn for instance began to focus more towards floorcloth, which he started to produce in his new purpose built Scottish floorboard factory at Pathhead Sands, famously nicknamed "Nairn's folly" for what would become universally known as linoleum. Linoleum was first introduced by the Scottish Linoleum Company (later Barry, Ostlere and Shepherd), due to the expired patent of Frederick Walton in 1877. Although the Michael Nairn & Co. Ltd. have since become famous, for their trademark and being the world producers of the cloth. The cloth made from cork, wood flour and linseed oil, saw production coincide with the jute mills of Dundee – with some already present in the town, particularly the West Bridges Mill in Linktown. This made Kirkcaldy easily recognisable from the queer-like smell of the odour of one of the principal ingredients, linseed oil. The Nairns, as a family, became philanthropists bequeathing land for public and commercial use, over the course of several decades, as "good deeds" to the citizens of Kirkcaldy, with examples such as two public parks (Beveridge and Ravenscraig) and a museum, art gallery and library complex. Other industries such as coal, pottery, flour, malt, printing, light electrical engineering and furniture manufacturing flourished. Carpets, whose production coincided with linoleum, were also made in the town for a brief time by the firm Victoria Carpets until they moved their production to Kidderminster in 1901. The burghs of Pathhead, Linktown, Gallatown and Sinclairtown were also officially merged into the royal burgh of Kirkcaldy in 1876.

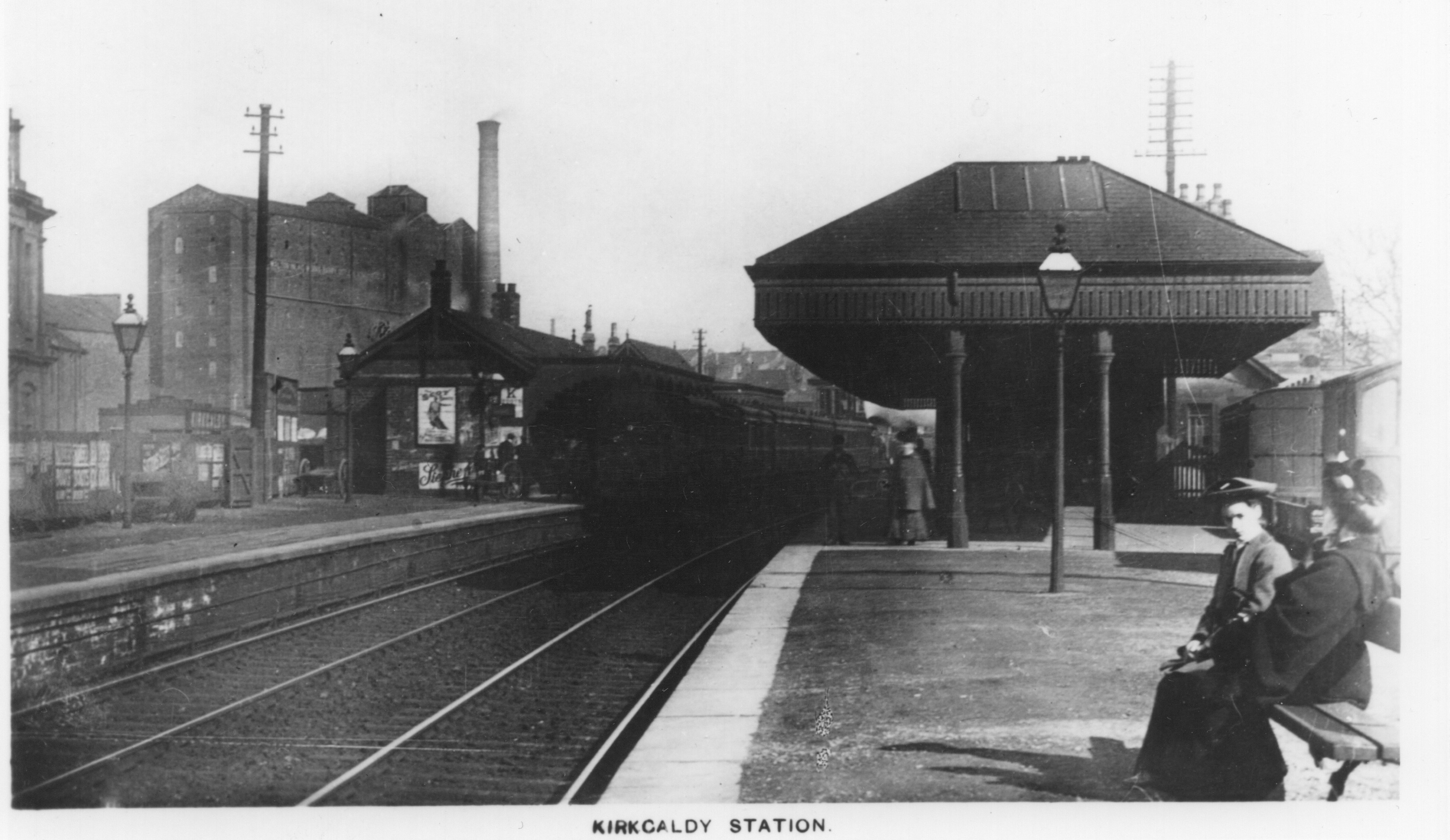
Kirkcaldy railway station, circa 1910, facing north. In the background is the Barry, Ostlere and Shepherd Caledonia Linoleum Works.

By the middle of the 20th century, the production of both pottery and salt drew to a close. Around this time, also saw the development of the esplanade (from an unemployment scheme); the first council houses and the merging of Dysart into Kirkcaldy under an act of parliament in 1930.

Further expansions of the town were to the north-west on B-class farm land (Hayfield, Boreland, Pathhead Muir, Dunnikier, Templehall, Mitchleson and Chapel) between 1930 and 1950.

== Post-War development ==
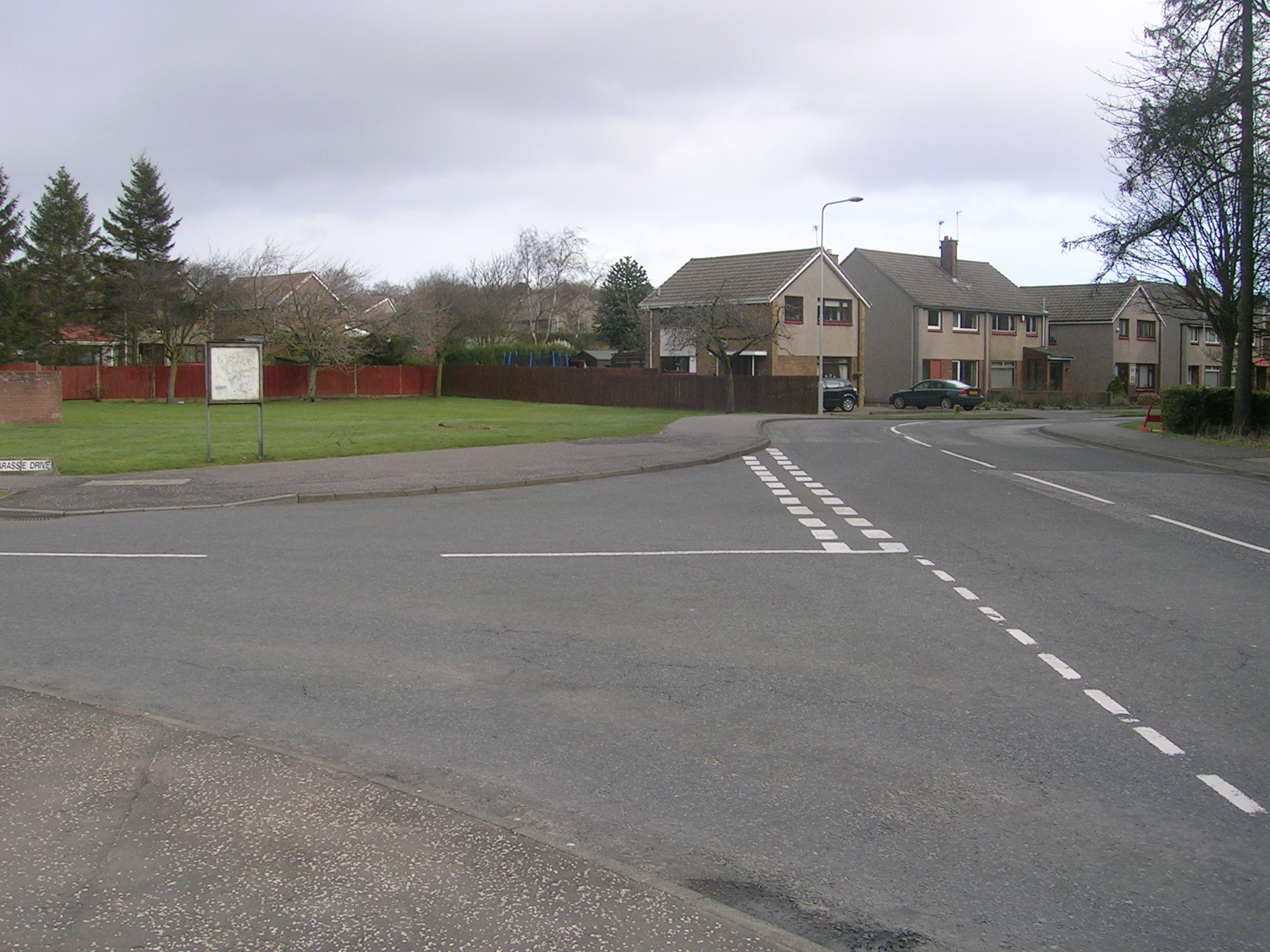
Dunnikier Estate – an example of a post-war housing development to the north of the town

A housing crisis arose in the town at the end of the Second World War. New residential and private housing estates to the north-west, multi-storey flats and the redevelopment of areas such as Sinclairtown and Linktown occurred between the 1950s and 1960s. Several primary schools such as Valley, Fair Isle, Dunearn and Torbain were also built to serve these new estates (with Capshard being a latter addition in the early 1970s). Provision was given to new junior secondaries (Templehall and Balwearie); a new Catholic secondary (St Andrews) and the re-location of Kirkcaldy High School to Pathhead muir on the north side of the town. During the middle of the 1950s, construction began of a new hospital – on the site of the Fever hospital and sanatorium – to replace the cramped facilities of the cottage hospital situated to the east of the town. The late 1950s saw a new bus station open on a site north of the town centre to relieve the existing one on The Promenade (which continued to deal only with country routes until this was phased out in 1980). There was speculation that the town could grow around the 55,000 to 60,000 mark by 1970. This never materialised when the decline of linoleum in the mid-1960s – with the closure of the linoleum firm, Barry, Ostlere and Shepherd, shocking the town in particular – saw the population of the town fall. To try to combat this, deep mining was commissioned at Seafield in 1954 by the National Coal Board to help reduce the impact of job losses, it later closed in 1988, after a tug of war between the National Union of Mineworkers and the Conservative Government. Kirkcaldy harbour, which had once been vital to the town's well-being, suffered its own fate when it was closed permanently in 1992 to main traffic.

== Today ==
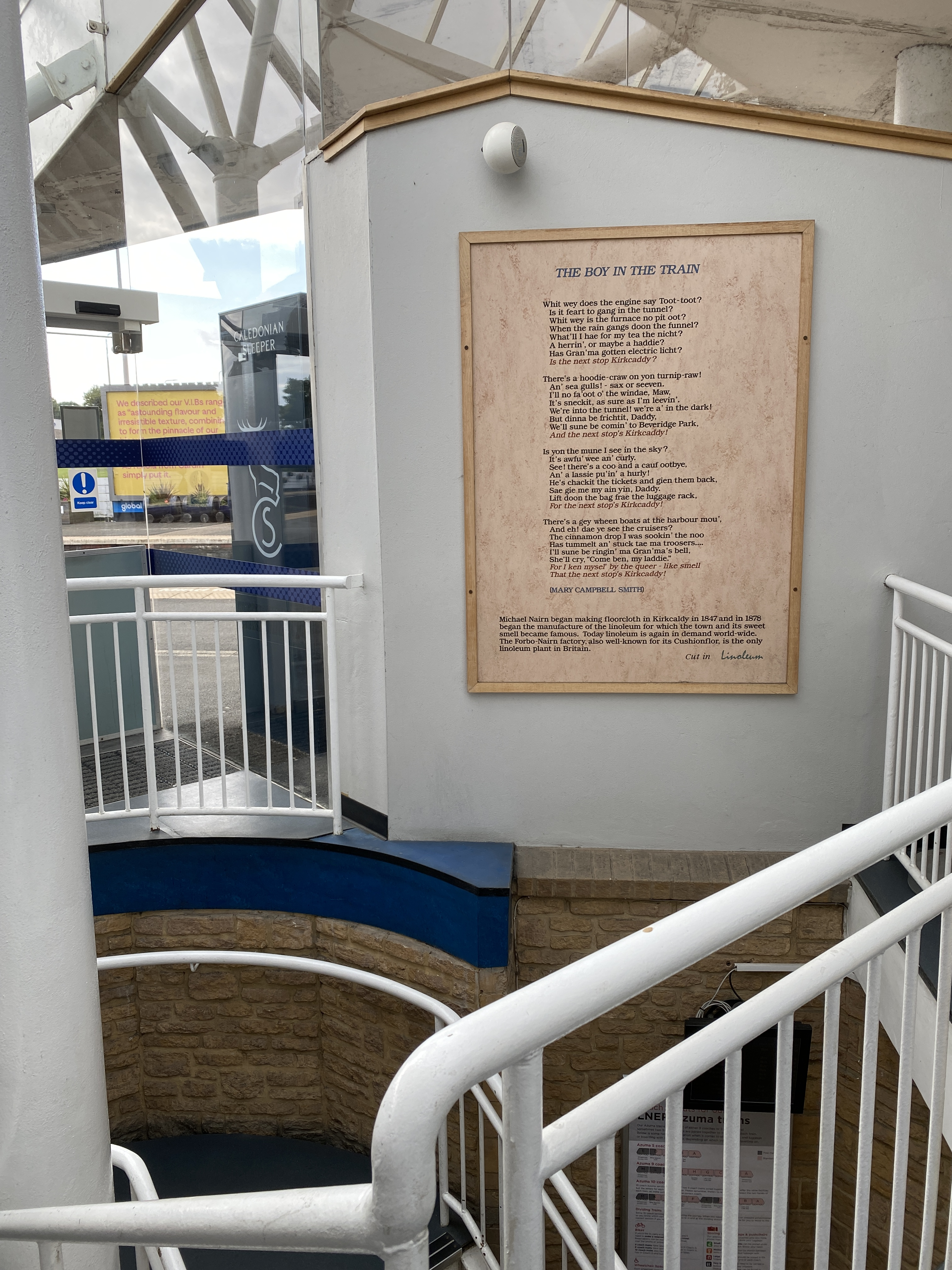
The "Boy in the Train" by Mary Campbell Smith (1869-1960) is a well known poem about Kirkcaldy, featuring arrival at Kirkcaldy Train Station and the smell of the linoleum factories nearby. It is now mounted above the stairs to Platform 1 in Kirkcaldy Railway Station.

There are still links to mark Kirkcaldy's past. A reference to the aroma of the linseed oil, used to make linoleum, is made in the poem, "Boy in the Train" by Mary Campbell Smith (1869-1960), first published in 1913. The best-known lines are:

for I ken mysel' by the queer-like smell,
that the next stop's Kirkcaddy

The poem is displayed on a sheet of linoleum in the waiting room of the south platform of Kirkcaldy Railway Station, donated by Forbo Nairn in 1994.

Kirkcaldy harbour- a housing development, where much of the former quays have become flat accommodation

Nowadays, Kirkcaldy remains a busy town for the surrounding areas complete with modernised secondary schools; two campuses of the Adam Smith College and prime shopping facilities in the town centre and Sinclairtown. The town also hosts the annual Links Market commonly known as Europe's longest street fair. The production of linoleum still continues to this day, despite being on a vastly reduced scale and now in Swiss ownership. The company, which has since become known as forbo nairn has also diversified into the production of vinyl floor tiles and marmoleum for which the latter is now their speciality. The construction of a retail and business park, to the north–west of the town centre has also opened in the last decade. The town has also been the site for recent housing developments as seen in Seafield, Chapel and the harbour. More housing developments are being anticipated over the course of the next 20 years, which will see 1700 homes to the east, in use as open cast mines at present, and another 1200 homes to the south–east, overlooking the former A92, known locally as the Quarry Road. Other future plans proposed by Fife Council will include replacing the 89-year-old sea wall on the promenade; starting up the delayed hovercraft service and building a replacement secondary school for Viewforth to serve the east side of Kirkcaldy.

Since 2020, Kirkcaldy Civic Society have been highlighting the town's history, in their Kirkcaldy in 50 Objects project.
