= Parkgate =

Parkgate may refer to:

== Places ==
- Parkgate, Cheshire, England, in Neston parish, on the Wirral
- Parkgate, County Antrim, Northern Ireland
- Parkgate, Cumbria, England; see List of United Kingdom locations: Par-Pay
- Parkgate, Dumfries and Galloway, Scotland
- Parkgate, Over Peover, Cheshire East, England; see List of United Kingdom locations: Par-Pay
- Parkgate, South Yorkshire, England
- Parkgate, Surrey, England, a settlement in Newdigate parish
- Park Gate, locality in the borough of Fareham in Hampshire, England

== Others ==
- Parkgate F.C., Rotherham, South Yorkshire, England
- Parkgate Junior School, Watford, England
- MV Parkgate, a Turnbull, Scott & Co cargo ship
