= Robert Paton =

Robert Paton may refer to:

- Robert Paton (footballer) (c. 1854–1905), Scottish footballer
- Robert Paton (politician) (1839–1917), Canadian politician and merchant
- Robert Paton (chemist) (fl. 2015)
- Robert T. Paton (1856–1929), Australian public health official

== See also ==
- Robert M. Patton (1809–1885), American politician
- Bert Paton, Scottish footballer and manager
