= Patten (surname) =

Patten is an English and Scottish surname. Notable people with the surname include:

- Alice Patten, English actress, daughter of Chris Patten, Baron Patten of Barnes
- Anna Patten (born 1999), English footballer
- Arthur B. Patten, American clergyman and author of books, hymn texts and poems
- Azel W. Patten (1828–1902), American businessman and politician
- Barry Patten (1927–2003), Australian Olympic alpine skier and architect
- Bebe Patten (1913–2004), Christian evangelist, founder of Patten University (see below)
- Brian Patten (1946–2025), English poet and author
- Casey Patten (1874–1935), professional baseball pitcher
- Cassie Patten (born 1987), British freestyle swimmer
- Charles Joseph Patten (1870–1948), Irish anatomist and ornithologist
- Chris Patten, Baron Patten of Barnes (born 1944), British Tory politician, last British Governor of Hong Kong
- David Patten (1974–2021), National Football League wide receiver
- David W. Patten (1799–1838), early leader and martyr of the Latter Day Saint movement
- Edward J. Patten (1905–1994), American Congressman and lawyer
- Eric Patten (1924–2013), resident of Toodyay, Western Australia
- Fred Patten (1940–2018), American author and historian
- Gilbert Patten (1866–1945), writer of dime novels, particularly the Frank Merriwell stories
- Harold Patten (1907–1969), American member of the House of Representatives from Arizona
- Henry Patten (born 1996), British professional tennis player
- J. Patten, English footballer who played for Southampton F.C. in 1907
- Jack Patten (1904–1957), Australian Aboriginal activist and journalist
- Joel Patten (born 1958), National Football League tackle
- John Patten (disambiguation), list of people with the name
- Joseph Patten (1710–1787), politician in Nova Scotia
- Luke Patten (born 1980), Australian rugby league player
- Marguerite Patten (1915–2015), English home economist, food writer and broadcaster
- Mark Patten (1902–1996), Scottish cricketer
- Matt Patten (born 1977), American member of the Ohio House of Representatives
- Nicholas Patten (born 1950), English judge
- Richard Patten (1942–2021), Canadian politician
- Robert Patten (disambiguation), list of people with the name
- Simon Patten (1852–1922), American economist
- Thelma Patten Law (1900–1968), African American physician
- Thomas G. Patten (1861–1939), American member of the House of Representatives from New York
- Wes Patten (born 1974), Australian rugby league footballer
- William Waynflete (c. 1398 – 1486), born William Patten, Lord Chancellor of England and Bishop of Winchester
- Zeboim Cartter Patten (1840–1925), American industrialist
