= Patten =

Patten may refer to:

- Patten (surname)
- patten (band), London-based electronic music group
- Patten (shoe), protective footwear similar to clogs
- Patten University, Christian liberal arts university in Oakland, California, United States

== Places ==
- Patten River, a tributary of the Turgeon River in Canada
- Patten, Georgia, an unincorporated community in the United States
- Patten, Maine, a town in the United States
  - Patten (CDP), Maine, the main settlement in the town

== See also ==
- Patton (disambiguation)
- Van Patten
- Paten, a small plate used to hold bread at the Eucharist
