= Michael Patton =

Michael Patton may refer to:

- Mike Patton (Michael Allan Patton, born 1968), American singer-songwriter
- Mike Patton (rugby league) (Michael Patrick Patton, born 1966), New Zealand
- Michael Quinn Patton (born 1945), American organizer and consultant

== See also ==
- Michael Paton (disambiguation)
