= Pasford =

Pasford may refer to:

- Pasford, Staffordshire on List of United Kingdom locations: Par-Pay
- John Pasford (fl. 1371–1394), English politician and member of Parliament
