= Patton (surname) =

Patton is a Scots-English surname. Notable people with the surname include:

== Military ==
- George S. Patton (1885–1945), American general
- George Patton IV (1923–2004), son of George S. Patton and also a U.S. Army general
- George Smith Patton (attorney)
- George S. Patton, Sr. (1833–1864), Confederate colonel and grandfather of George S. Patton
- Raymond Stanton Patton (1882–1937), American admiral and engineer, second Director of the United States Coast and Geodetic Survey
- Waller T. Patton (1835–1863), Confederate lieutenant colonel and great-uncle of George S. Patton

== Politics ==
- Barbara Patton (born 1944), New York politician and university professor
- Charles Emory Patton (1859–1937), U.S. Congressman from Pennsylvania
- E. Earl Patton (1927–2011), Georgia state senator from 1969 to 1970
- Henry D. Patton (c. 1876–1966), New York assemblyman 1914
- James Patton (Lieutenant Governor), Lieutenant Governor of Mississippi from 1820 to 1822
- John Patton (Detroit mayor) (1822–1900)
- John Patton (1823–1897), U.S. Congressman from Pennsylvania
- John Patton, Jr. (1850–1907), U.S. Senator from Michigan
- John Denniston Patton (1829–1904), U.S. Congressman from Pennsylvania
- John Mercer Patton (1797–1858), U.S. Congressman from Virginia
- Marguerite Courtright Patton (1889–1971), 21st President General of the Daughters of the American Revolution and anti-communist
- Paul E. Patton (born 1937), Governor of Kentucky from 1995 to 2003
- Robert M. Patton (1809–1885), Governor of Alabama from 1865 to 1868

== Academia ==
- Elizabeth Patton, FRSE professor of chemical genetics, Personal Chair in Melanoma Genetics and Drug Discovery, MRC Human Genetics Unit, Edinburgh
- Francis L. Patton (1843–1932), 12th President of Princeton University
- Carl Patton, former president of Georgia State University
- Paul R. Patton (born 1950), Professor of Philosophy at the University of New South Wales
- James L. Patton (born 1941), Professor of Integrative Biology at UC Berkeley

== Arts ==
- Big Boi, the stage name of Antwan André Patton (born 1975), hip hop artist
- Bill Patton (1894–1951), American actor
- Candice Patton (born 1985), American actress
- Charley Patton (1891–1934), U.S. blues musician
- Chris Patton (born 1971), American actor
- Conro, or "Conor Patton", Canadian music producer
- Fiona Patton (born 1962), Canadian fantasy author
- John Patton (musician), Hammond organ player
- Mike Patton (born 1968), American musician
- Ashlyn Gere, or "Kimberly Patton" (born 1959), adult actress
- Paula Patton (born 1975), American actress
- Donovan Patton (born 1978), American actor and voice actor
- Virginia Patton (1925–2022), American actress

== Sports ==
- Arthur Patton (1916-1990), Australian rugby league footballer
- Bill Patton (baseball) (1912–1986), American baseball player
- Debbie Patton, American bodybuilder
- Casey Patton (born 1974), Canadian retired boxer
- Darvis Patton (born 1977), American Olympic sprinter
- Jimmy Patton (1933–1972), American Football Player NFL NY GIANTS
- Jonathon Patton (born 1992), Australian rules footballer
- Joshua Patton (born 1997), American basketball player in the Israeli Basketball Premier League
- Justin Patton (born 1997), American basketball player for Hapoel Eilat of the Israeli Basketball Premier League
- Mel Patton (1924–2014), American Olympic sprinter
- Mike Patton (rugby league), New Zealand rugger
- Quinton Patton (born 1990), American football player
- Spencer Patton (born 1988), American professional baseball player
- Steve Patton, American football coach
- Troy Patton (born 1985), American baseball pitcher

== Other ==
- Carl Patton (born 1949), American serial killer
- Grace Espy Patton (1866-1904), American professor; state superintendent of schools
- James Patton (Virginia colonist) {1692-155), Irish immigrant to colonial Virginia
- Henry Patton (1867–1943), Irish bishop
- James French Patton (1843–1882), American lawyer
- Michael Quinn Patton (born 1945), U.S. organizer and consultant
- William Hampton Patton (1853–1918), American entomologist

== Fictional characters ==
- Patton Drilovsky (Numbuh 60), from the Cartoon Network animated series Codename: Kids Next Door
- Paul Patton, secret identity of comic book character The Fox
