= Innellan =

Coordinates: 55.8943°N 4.9573°W

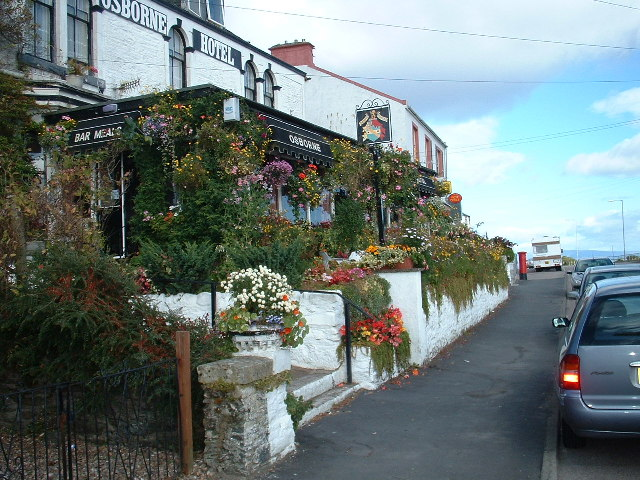
- The Osbourne Hotel, Innellan

- Location within Argyll and Bute
- Population: 1,140 (2020)
- OS grid reference: NS 14500 70200
- Council area: Argyll and Bute
- Lieutenancy area: Argyll and Bute
- Country: Scotland
- Sovereign state: United Kingdom
- Post town: DUNOON, ARGYLL
- Postcode district: PA23
- Dialling code: 01369
- UK Parliament: Argyll, Bute and South Lochaber
- Scottish Parliament: Argyll and Bute

Innellan is a village in Argyll and Bute, west of Scotland, on the western shore of the Firth of Clyde. It is four miles south of Dunoon.

== History ==
The origin of the name "Innellan" is obscure. The village was developed as a holiday destination in Victorian times on the site of a smaller and older farming settlement, and the first steamboat pier was built in 1851. With a resident population of around 1,000, growing to many more in summer, Innellan found prosperity as one of many seaside resorts along the shores of the Firth of Clyde serving tourist traffic primarily coming from the city of Glasgow further upriver, travelling on Clyde steamers.

== Primary school ==
Innellan Primary School was established in 1868.

== Churches ==
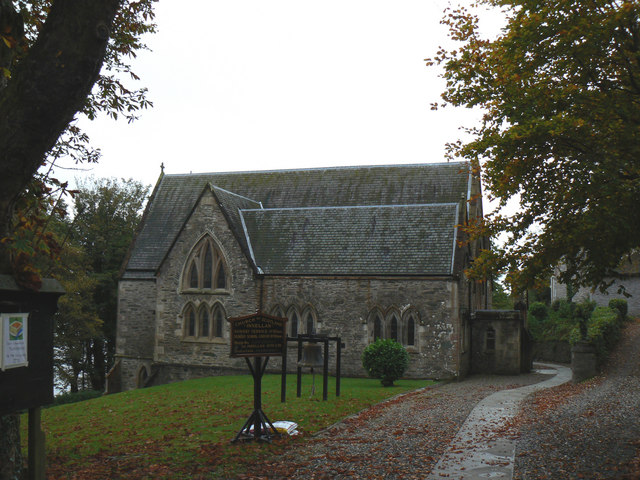
Innellan Church

Innellan once had four churches: two Church of Scotland, one Free Church and one Episcopal. Two of them still stand; the former West Church is now converted to a house, and the remaining Innellan or Matheson church was the charge of the Reverend Dr George Matheson, the blind minister who wrote the hymn "Oh Love that wilt not let me go."

Innellan Church was sold in 2023 and is now privately owned. Until recently, locals were still attending it for church services and/or weddings, funerals and even craft fairs, such as quilting exhibitions. The attached hall at the back/side of the hall held various clubs/activities over the years including Sunday Schools, fitness classes and a church-related family group called Alpha that held events and showed films. A children's choir run by Dunoon Grammar School music teacher Ian Davies, his wife, primary teacher Mary, and Mary's mother (and local piano teacher) Peggy Thompson rehearsed in the hall occasionally during the late 1980s/early 1990s. Innellan Youth Club was set up by local young people in the 1990s and ran for several years in the hall. The Innellan Youth Club was not affiliated with any religion and was simply a sociable club using the church hall, likewise the young people's choir.

A history of Innellan was written by the Rev John Hill, minister of the West Church, in 1950. It is now out of print, and was somewhat preoccupied with religious affairs. More recently, local resident Margaret Hubbard wrote a comprehensive collection of books about significant moments across the village's history. The books are known as "From Scenes Like These, Innellan," and the first of the collection was published in 2010.

== Innellan today ==
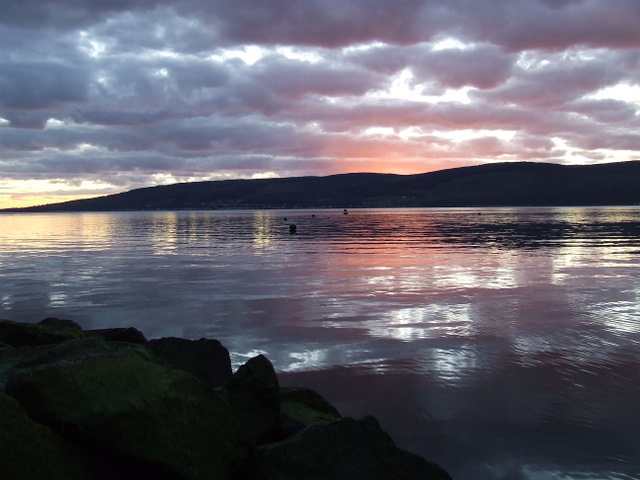
Clyde sunset

Innellan possesses views across the Firth of Clyde, stretching from Kilcreggan and Loch Long (looking north) to Cumbrae Head and Ailsa Craig (looking south). There is a local golf club, with a nine-hole course on the hill.

The village's strip of shops (which once numbered fourteen) has now been reduced to just the Post Office. There are two pubs in the Village, The Osborne and The Villagers Royal, but other services are provided by the nearby town of Dunoon, which is linked by a bus service.

=== Notable people ===
- George Paton, recipient of the Victoria Cross
- John Thomas Rochead lived here briefly in 1871
