= John Patton =

John Patton may refer to:

- John Patton (Pennsylvania politician) (1823–1897), U.S. Representative from the U.S. state of Pennsylvania
- John Patton (Wyoming politician) (1930–2015), member of the Wyoming House of Representatives
- John Patton (Detroit mayor) (1822–1900), mayor of Detroit, Michigan, 1858–1859
- John Patton Jr. (1850–1907), U.S. Senator from the U.S. state of Michigan
- John Patton (musician) (1935–2002), soul jazz organ player
- John Patton (colonel) (1745–1804), Pennsylvania officer in the American Revolutionary War
- John M. Patton (1797–1858), U.S. Representative from the U.S. state of Virginia
- John M. Patton (Minnesota politician) (1928–2010), American politician
- John Denniston Patton (1829–1904), U.S. Representative from the U.S. state of Pennsylvania
- John Patton (GC) (1915–1996), Canadian recipient of the George Cross

== See also ==
- John Paton (disambiguation)
- John Patten (disambiguation)
