= George Paton =

George Paton may refer to:

- George Henry Tatham Paton (1895–1917), Scottish recipient of the Victoria Cross
- George Whitecross Paton (1902–1985), Australian legal scholar and Vice Chancellor of Melbourne University
- George Paton (cricketer) (1879–1950), Australian cricketer
- George Paton (footballer), Scottish footballer
- George Paton (American football executive) (born 1970), general manager of the Denver Broncos

== See also ==
- George Patton (disambiguation)
