= The Boy in the Train =

Famous Scottish poem about trains

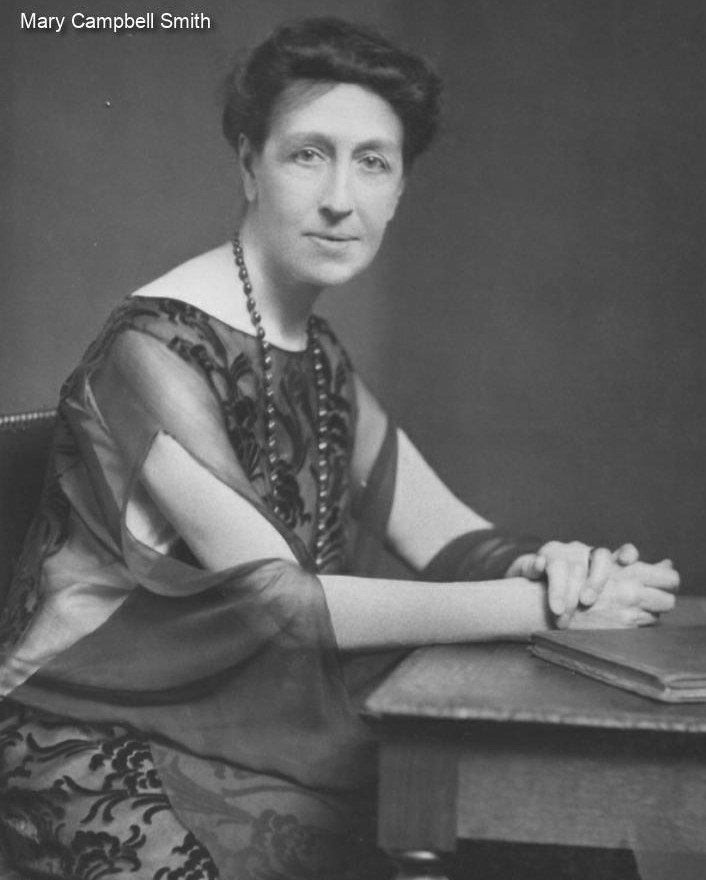
Mary Campbell Smith, author of "The Boy in the Train"

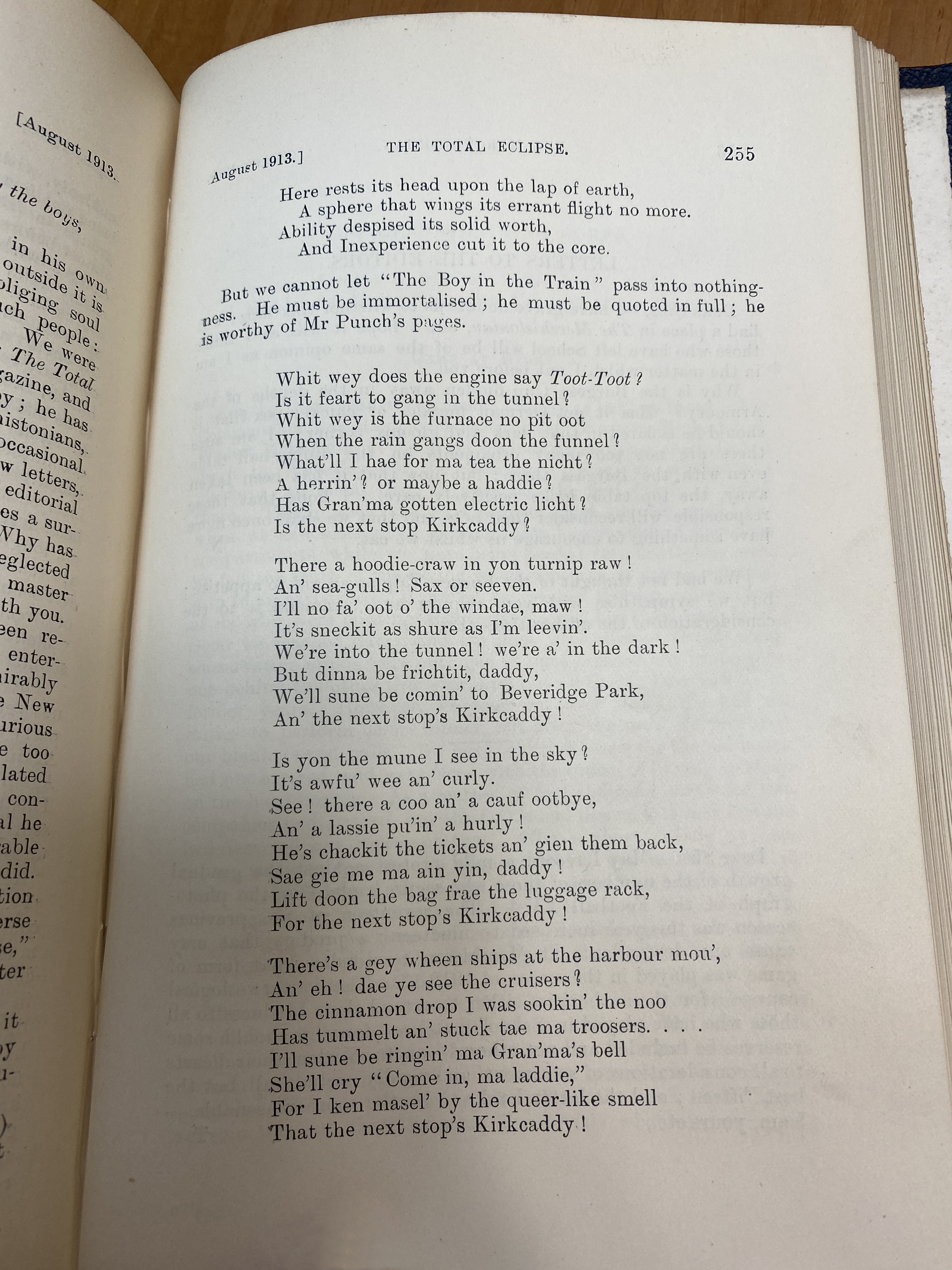
The earliest surviving publication of the Boy in the Train, in the Merchiston Castle School's Merchistonian journal, 1913, p. 255.

The Boy in the Train is a poem written in Scots, by Mary Campbell (Edgar) Smith (1869–1960), first published in 1913. It is featured in many anthologies of Scottish verse, texts related to railway history, and is routinely quoted when discussing linoleum, and the history of the Scottish town Kirkcaldy. It is a popular poem in Scottish culture, often being a children's party piece, and "recited by generations of primary school children". The crime-writer Val McDermid, who was born in Kirkcaldy, has said "As school kids we all had to learn The Boy in the Train".

== Origin ==
Mary Campbell Smith was born in Tongland, Kirkcudbrightshire, and was the daughter of the Reverend Andrew Edgar, minister of Mauchline, Ayrshire. In 1895 she married George Smith (1868–1957), the headmaster of Merchiston Castle School in Edinburgh. They would take their Easter holidays in Elie, Fife, travelling there by train. Written in Scots, the poem quotes an inquisitive young boy who was in their carriage, asking questions on the way to his grandmother's house in Kirkcaldy, Fife. The poem captures the growing pre-war industrialisation of Kirkcaldy, including the distinct smell of the linoleum factories, for which the town was famous.

== Publication and text ==
=== Publication history ===
The Boy in the Train was first published in August 1913 in a single-issue school magazine, called the Total Eclipse, produced by the school-boys of Merchiston Castle School. No copies of this are known to have survived. The poem was reproduced in the official school journal, The Merchistonian, in August 1913 (although the poet was not named). By 1915 The Boy in the Train was known to Sir Michael Nairn (1838–1915), industrialist and owner of seven of Kirkcaldy's linoleum factories, who had the poem printed up as a calling card. The poem appeared in full in the Fife Free Press in 1916, attributed to a "young man belonging to Pathhead, who is now in the United States" with the initials "C.N". It became popularly known as Next Stop Kirkcaldy and from the early 1920s was widely reported as being a popular concert recital piece both in Fife, and elsewhere in Scotland.

In 1925 it was published in a book of Twentieth Century Scots Verse, selected by Mr William Robb, Chief Inspector of Schools in Lanarkshire. Robb was an expert in Scots dialect, interested in the "revival of the use of the Scots vernacular tongue as a literary medium", lecturing and publishing on Modern Scots Poetry. Robb was the first to name Mary Campbell Smith as author of the poem, citing his source as the Total Eclipse 1913 magazine. Twentieth Century Scots Verse also contains the only other known poem by Mary Campbell Smith, Mirren McKee. After publication in this volume, The Boy in the Train's popularity increased, and has been included in many anthologies of popular Scottish verse. It has often being recorded as having been performed and enjoyed at concerts throughout Scotland. By the mid 20th Century was synonymous with Kirkcaldy in popular culture.

Although she lived to see the growing popularity of her poem, it is believed that Mary Campbell Smith never set foot in the station that she made famous.

=== Form ===
The poem is written in four stanzas in phonetically transcribed Scots. The four stanzas each have eight lines (octaves), in alternating Iambic tetrameter and Iambic trimeter with some playing with Anapestic stressing. The strong rhythm echoes the noise of a steam train travelling at speed along tracks. The poem uses the ABABCDCD traditional rhyme scheme. However, the last line of the first three stanzas is repeated: "next stop Kirkcaddy", giving repetition of the D rhyme in each stanza, although changing from question to growing confidence as a statement. This is resolved in the final two lines, with the poem's well-known phrase:

For I ken mysel' by the queer-like smell / That the next stop's Kirkcaddy!

== Analysis ==
=== Interpretation ===
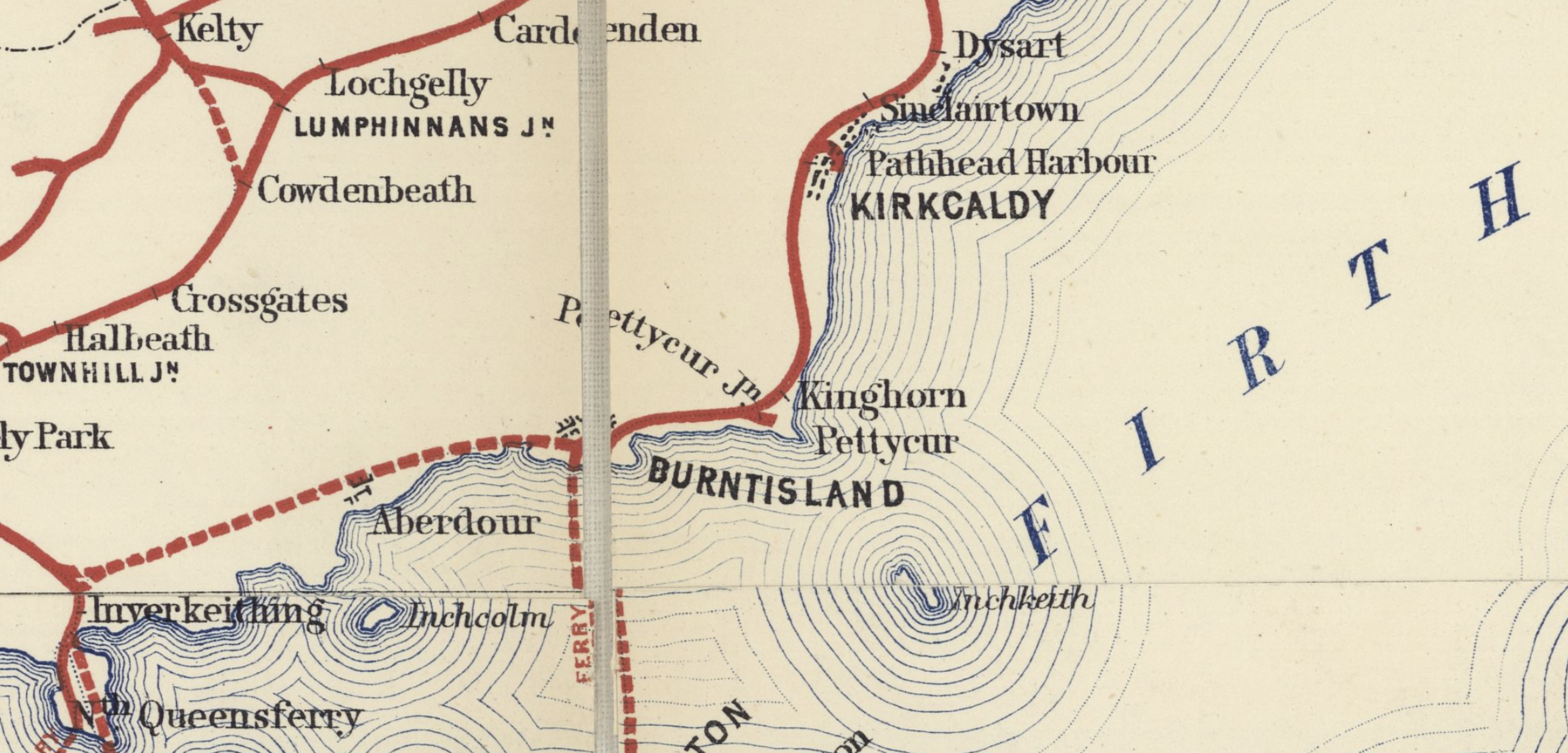
Fife coastal line of the North British Railway System in 1882, from a map in the National Library of Scotland.

The Boy in the Train describes the steam train journey of an un-named, young boy with his mother and father, from an unnamed western point on the coastal train line in Fife, as they travel eastwards and then north to Kirkcaldy railway station, to visit his grandmother. The poem is a range of questions asked and excited, humorous observations made by the boy, leaving no space for any reply, but showing his developing reasoning as he goes through a landscape he starts to recognise. Although first published in 1913, the date of writing is unknown. The poem details the change from rural to modernising and industrial urban landscape. The boy anthropomorphises the train, before questioning how it works, thinks about his dinner, then asks "Has Gran'ma gotten electric licht?". This refers to the gradual electrification of Kirkcaldy, which had begun in 1904, with a steady growth in private homes being connected. The 1910 Electric Lighting Order Confirmation (No.2) Act Order for the South of Scotland, and the schedule laid out in 1911, included a specified area of Kirkcaldy in the second mass-electrificaiton schedule and the laying of tramlines and streetlights. This is juxtaposed in the poem by noting nature in the rural landscape on the approach to Kirkcaldy, such as the birds, and the moon. The child's gaze spots other children in the pre-industrial landscape: the cow and the calf, and the "lassie pu'in' a hurly!" (a girl pulling a roughly-made hand cart).

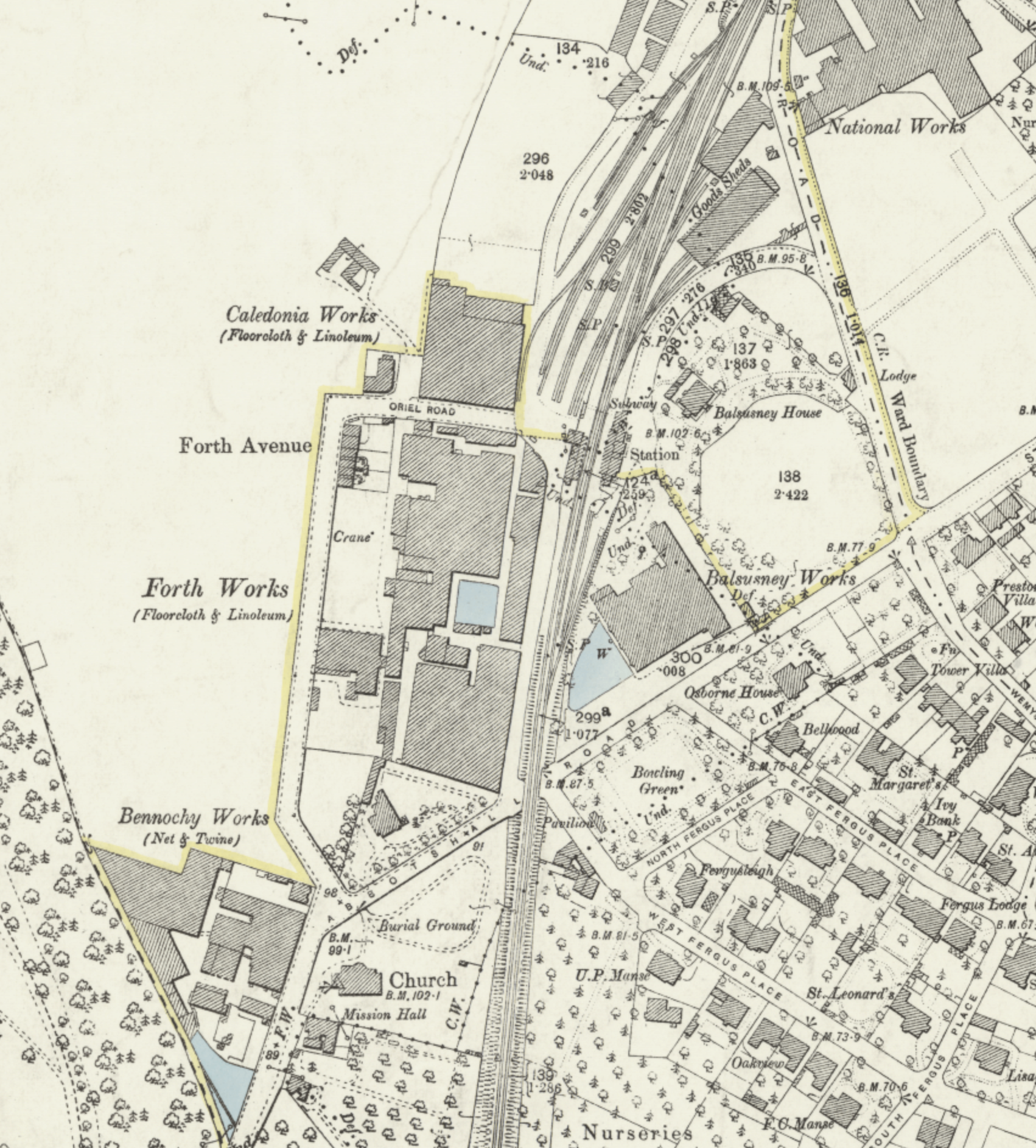
Ordnance Survey Map of Kirkcaldy Railway Station in 1914, showing the linoleum works nearby. From the National Library of Scotland.

There are several specific geographic features mentioned in the poem. At the time of publication of the poem, the trainline was operated by the North British Railway company (the station in Kirkcaldy had been operational since 1847). The tunnel described is the Kinghorn Tunnel, a 265 yard tunnel southwest of Kinghorn Station, the station prior to Kirkcaldy on the line. Although it is not clear where the boy's train journey in the poem starts, it must have been before Kinghorn. Given there is no mention of the Forth Bridge, the starting point must be another station in Fife on the North British Railway line.

The boy knows that on the approach to Kirkcaldy railway station they will "sune be comin' to Beveridge Park": a large Victorian park opened in 1892, which was bequeathed to the people of Kirkcaldy by the industrialist and Provost Michael Beveridge (1836–1890). Beveridge was a linen manufacturer and founder of the linoleum company Barry, Ostlere and Shepherd, the "second largest floorcovering manufacturer in Scotland" after the Michael Nairn and Co linoleum company.

The "gey wheen boats at the harbour mou" in the Firth of Forth must be outside Kinghorn harbour mouth: Kirkcaldy harbour is not visible from the train before Kirkcaldy station, as the line turns inland. Kinghorn's Abden Shipyard was not operational at time of publication, although its harbour would have been. "And eh! dae ya see the cruisers?" in the poem may refer to traffic to the Rosyth naval base and dockyard which had been established in 1909 "in anticipation of a naval arms race with Germany". There were frequently reported manoeuvres of the First Fleet in the Firth of Forth in 1912 and 1913. The excitement of the boy shows an innocence in the face of the growing power of the Royal Navy. The seriousness of seeing the cruisers is punctured when the boy spits out his sweet and it sticks to his trousers.

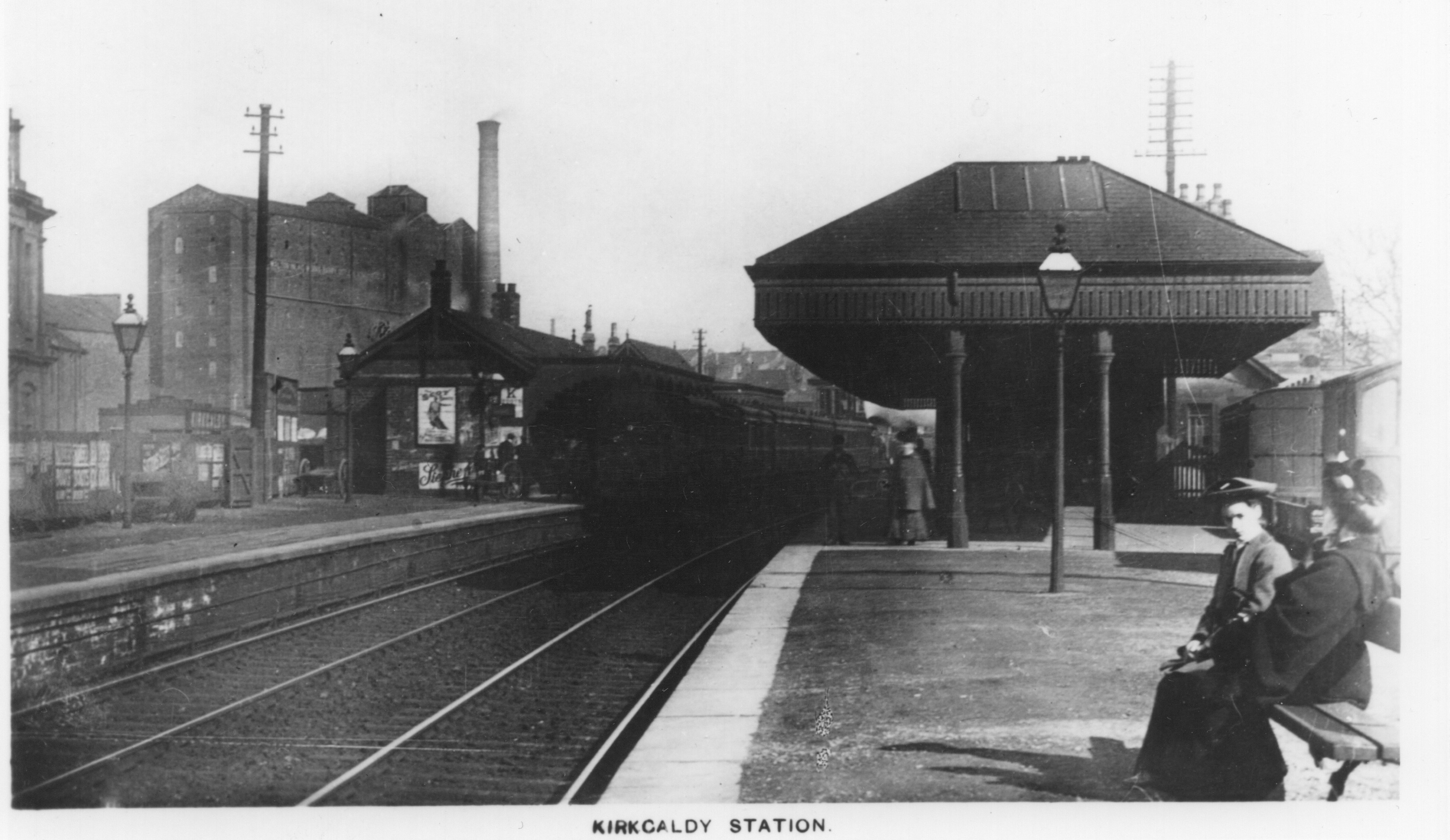
Kirkcaldy Railway Station, facing North, circa 1910. In the Background is the Barry, Ostlere and Shepherd Caledonian Linoleum Works.

Eventually, the famous "queer-like smell" of Kirkcaldy's many linoleum factories lets the boy know that they will soon be arriving in Kirkcaldy. The smell of linoleum is distinctive, given the production process where linseed oil is oxidised and pressed together with resins, ground cork and pigments. There were many factories clustered around the train station (and Kirkcaldy harbour) to allow transport of the linoleum. The Balsusney Works, National Linoleum Works, Rosslyn and Lorne Linoleum Works, and Barry, Ostlere and Shepherd Caledonia Linoleum Works were all next to Kirkcaldy railway station.

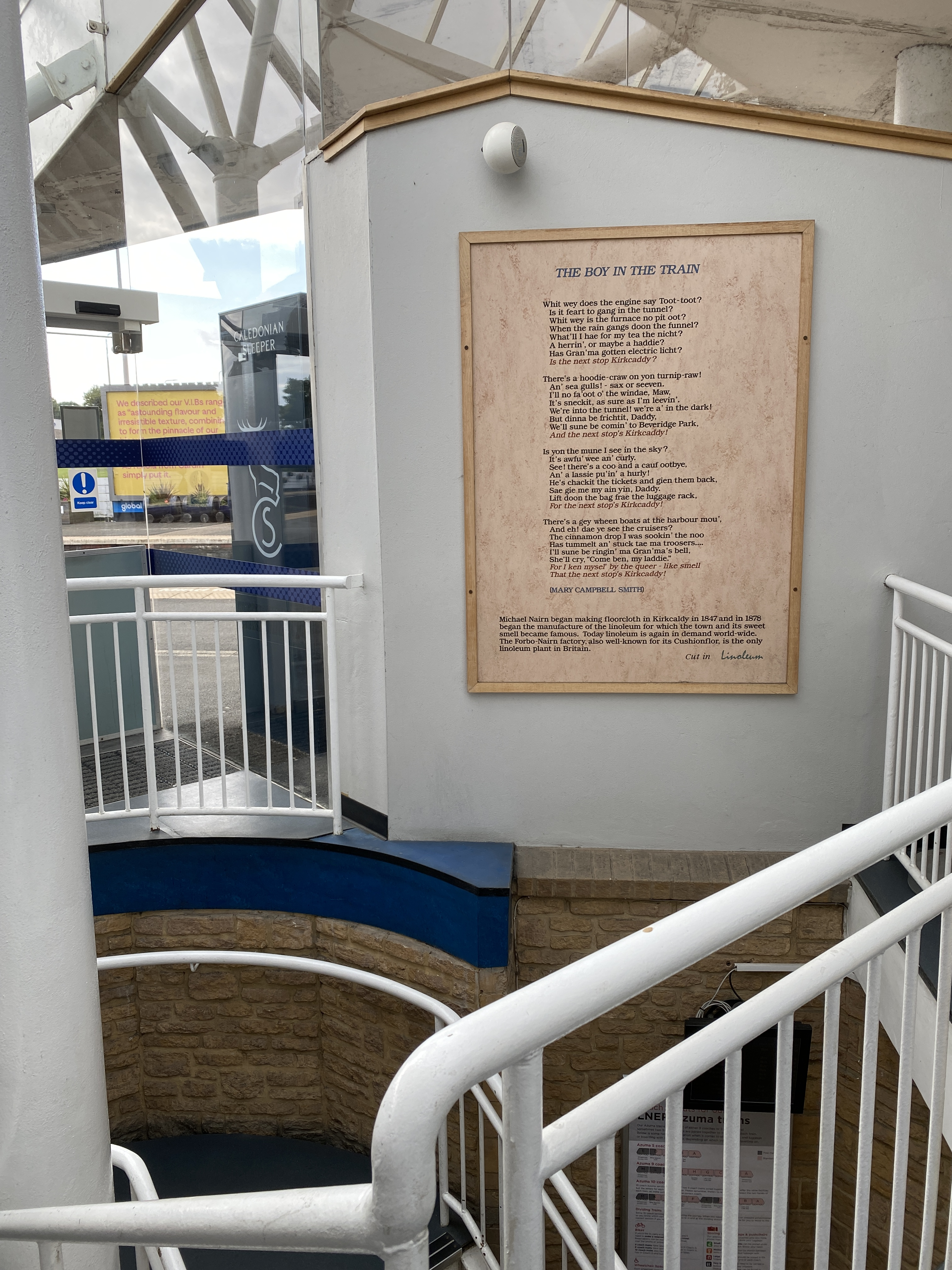
The poem, cut in linoleum, is mounted above the stairs to platform 1 in Kirkcaldy railway station, sponsored by the linoleum company Forbo-Nairn.

At the time of writing circa 1913 the poem was therefore a record of recent development of a Fife landscape that had been rapidly industrialised, at a time of great change. However, given the demise of most of the linoleum industry in the mid twentieth century, the subsequent demolition of the majority of Kirkcaldy's linoleum factory buildings, and the replacement of steam trains by diesel in the 1960s, the poem now has nostalgic charm for a bygone time.

== Cultural significance ==
The poem is often quoted in travel guides as immortalising the smell of Kirkcaldy's Linoleum factories, and in description of the route into Kirkcaldy.

In 1993 a touring exhibition on the history of linoleum, entitled 'The Queer-Like Smell' after the line in the poem, was put together by Kirkcaldy Museum and Art Gallery, and toured various museums in Scotland.

In 1994 the poem was reproduced in laser-cut linoleum and unveiled in Kirkcaldy railway station.

In 1998, the final lines of the poem were used to describe Kirkcaldy in the biography of Gordon Brown, the prime minister of the UK, who grew up in Kirkcaldy.

In 2016 a competition was launched for residents of Kirkcaldy to write their own, modern version of the poem in celebration of Kirkcaldy4All festival.

In 2018, the writer Val McDermid, who is from Kirkcaldy, quoted it in a BBC documentary on "The Town That Floored the World".

The poem is read at the annual prize-giving at Kirkcaldy High School.
