= O. Douglas =

Scottish novelist (1877–1948)

Anna Masterton Buchan
- Anna Masterton Buchan
- Born: 24 March 1877; Pathhead, Dysart, Scotland
- Died: 24 November 1948 (aged 71); Peebles, Scotland
- Occupation: Novelist
- Relatives: John Buchan (brother)
- Writing career
- Pen name: O. Douglas
- Period: 1912–1948
- Genre: Fiction

Anna Masterton Buchan (24 March 1877 – 24 November 1948) was a Scottish novelist who wrote under the pen name O. Douglas. Most of her novels were written and set between the wars and portrayed small town or village life in southern Scotland, reflecting her own life.

Anna Buchan was born in Pathhead, Scotland, to the Reverend John Buchan and Helen Masterton. She was the younger sister of John Buchan, the statesman and author. She attended Hutchesons' Grammar School in Glasgow, but lived most of her later life in Peebles in the Scottish border country, not far from the village of Broughton where her parents first met.

Her first novel Olivia in India was published in 1912 by Hodder & Stoughton. Unforgettable, Unforgotten (1945) is a memoir of her brother John, Lord Tweedsmuir, and the Buchan family. In it, she recounts her experience visiting her brother in Canada, where he was Governor-General from 1935-1940. Her autobiography, Farewell to Priorsford, was published posthumously in 1950.

Her work is displayed alongside her brother's at the John Buchan Museum in Peebles.

== Literary style and reception ==
A contemporary review describes Olivia in India as a "happy book" and another commented, "To have read this book is to have met an extremely likeable personality in the author". This was to be the hallmark of all her fiction, gently humorous domestic dramas with little if any reference to political events or social change. Merren Strang, a character in Pink Sugar who writes novels similar to those of O. Douglas, describes her impulse to write "something very simple that would make pleasant reading — you see, there's nothing of Art for Art's sake about me". Merren later quotes one of her reviews: "'This is a book about good, gentle, scrupulous people who live on the bright side of life'", banteringly describing herself as circumscribed as a novelist by only having met decent people, and thus being unable to create convincing "ape and tiger sort of people" like the "strong novelists" of the day.

In her obituary, The Scotsman noted: "It has been objected that the people of her books are too "pleasant," but, at a time when fiction was passing through an ultra-realistic phase, this pleasantness was a relief to many readers."

== Bibliography ==
- Olivia in India (1912)
- The Setons (1917)
- Penny Plain (1920)
- Ann and Her Mother (1922)
- Pink Sugar (1924)
- The Proper Place (1926)
- Eliza for Common (1928)
- The Day of Small Things (1930)
- Priorsford (1932)
- Taken by the Hand (1935)
- Jane's Parlour (1937)
- People Like Ourselves (1938) [Omnibus of Penny Plain, Pink Sugar and Priorsford]
- The House That Is Our Own (1940)
- Unforgettable, Unforgotten (1945) [under the name Anna Buchan]
- Farewell to Priorsford (1950)
