= Robert Patten =

Robert Patten may refer to:

- Robert Patten (Australian politician) (1859–1940), English-born Australian politician
- Robert W. Patten (1832–1913), American eccentric, known as the Umbrella Man
- Robert Patten (Jacobite chaplain) (fl. 1715), Jacobite chaplain and historian
- Robert L. Patten (1925–1994), American politician in the Georgia House of Representatives
- Robert Patten (actor) (1925–2001), American film and television actor

== See also ==
- Robert Paton (disambiguation)
- Robert M. Patton (1809–1885), American politician
