= John Stafford Paton =

English officer in the British Indian Army (1821–1889)

John S. Paton CB
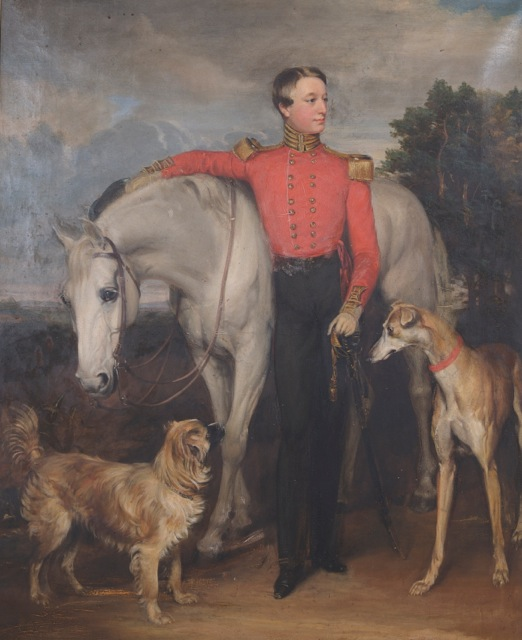
- Born: 3 March 1821; Agra, India
- Died: 28 November 1889 (aged 68); London, England
- Spouse: Wilhelmina Jane Tennant (m. 1852)
- Military career
- Allegiance: United Kingdom; East India Company
- Branch: Bengal Army; British Indian Army: Bengal Native Infantry
- Service years: 1840–1877
- Rank: General
- Conflicts: Gwalior campaign; Battle of Maharajpore; First Sikh War; Battle of Ferozeshah; Battle of Sobraon; Second Sikh War; Battle of Sadoolapore; Battle of Chillianwala (WIA); Indian Mutiny; Battle of Jhelum

John Stafford Paton, CB (1821–1889) was an English general in the Indian Army. He served in the Sikh Wars of 1845–1846 and 1848–1849, and was severely wounded at Chillianwallah; served under Sir C. J. Napier against the Afridees and at the Kohat Pass in 1850; and in 1867 commanded the field detachment from Lahore sent to aid in suppressing the Gogaira insurrection during the Indian Mutiny.

== Origins ==
John Stafford Paton was son of Captain John Forbes Paton, of the Bengal Engineers (1796–1826), and was grandson of another Bengal officer, Colonel John Paton (died 1824), who saw forty-one years' service in India, and whose Tables of Routes and Stages in the Presidency of Fort William (3rd edition, Calcutta, 1821, fol.) went through several editions.

== Military career ==
John Stafford was born at Agra, India, on 3 March 1821. He was educated at the East India Company's military seminary at Addiscombe, and in 1837 obtained a Bengal infantry cadetship. On 3 October 1840 he was appointed lieutenant in the 14th Bengal Native Infantry, with which he served at the Battle of Maharajpore in 1843, and in the Sikh War of 1845–1846, being present at the battles of Ferozeshah and Sobraon (medal and two clasps), and in the expedition to Kat-Kangra under Brigadier Alexander Jack.

As a deputy assistant quartermaster-general he served in the Punjab campaign of 1848–1849, and was present in the affair at Ramnuggur, the passage of the Chenab, and the battles at Sadoolapore and Chillianwallah, where he was severely wounded (medal and clasps).

In 1850 he served with the expedition under Sir Charles James Napier against the Afridees, and was present at the forcing of the Kohat Pass, near Peshawur (medal). He became captain in his regiment on 8 February 1851, and received a brevet majority the day after for services in the Punjab in 1848–1849.

As brevet lieutenant-colonel and assistant quartermaster-general he served with the force sent to suppress the Gogaira insurrection in 1857, where he commanded the field detachment from Lahore, which was three times engaged with the enemy. While Paton was thus employed, his regiment—the 14th Native Infantry—mutinied at Jhelum. He was appointed brevet colonel and deputy quartermaster-general in the Punjab in November 1857.

He joined the Bengal Staff Corps on its formation, and became a major-general on 29 October 1866. He was quartermaster-general in Bengal in 1863–1868, and was in temporary charge of a division of the Bengal Army in 1870.

Paton, who during his active career had been thirty times mentioned in despatches and orders, was made a C.B. in 1873. He became a general on the retired list on 1 October 1877.

== Personal life ==
He married, in 1852, Wilhelmina Jane, daughter of Colonel Sir James Tennant, K.C.B., H.E.I.C.S. He died at his residence, 86 Oxford Terrace, London, W., on 28 November 1889.

== Honours ==
- Companion of the Order of the Bath
- Sutlej Medal, with two clasps
- Punjab Medal, with clasps
- India General Service Medal

== Sources ==
- Buckland, C. E. (1906). "Paton, John Stafford (1821–1889)". In Dictionary of Indian Biography. London: Swan Sonnenschein & Co., Lim. p. 330.
- Chichester, H. M.; Lunt, James (2010). "Paton, John Stafford (1821–1889), army officer in the East India Company". Oxford Dictionary of National Biography (online ed.). Oxford University Press. doi:10.1093/ref:odnb/21558. (Subscription, Wikipedia Library access or UK public library membership required.)
- Vibart, H. M. (1894). Addiscombe: Its Heroes and Men of Note. Westminster: Archibald Constable and Co. pp. 401, 655, 679.

Attribution:

- This article incorporates text from a publication now in the public domain: Chichester, Henry Manners (1895). "Paton, John Stafford". In Lee, Sidney (ed.). Dictionary of National Biography. Vol. 44. London: Smith, Elder & Co. p. 36.
