= John Paton =

John Paton may refer to:

- John Paton (Covenanter) (died 1684) Scottish soldier and Covenanter, executed at the Grassmarket on 9 May 1684
- John Stafford Paton (1821–1889), English general in the British Indian Army
- John Gibson Paton (1824–1907), Protestant missionary to the New Hebrides
- John Brown Paton (1830–1911), Scottish Nonconformist theologian
- John Paton (VC) (1833–1914), Scottish recipient of the Victoria Cross
- John Paton (general) (1867–1943), Australian Major General
- John Paton (British politician) (1886–1976), Labour Member of Parliament for Norwich 1945–1950, Norwich North 1950–1964
- Johnny Paton (1923–2015), Scottish footballer

== See also ==
- John Patten (disambiguation)
- John Patton (disambiguation)
