= George Patton (disambiguation) =

George S. Patton (George Smith Patton Jr., 1885–1945) was a general of the United States Army during World War II.

George Patton may also refer to:

- George S. Patton Sr. (1833–1864), a Confederate colonel during the American Civil War, grandfather of World War II general George S. Patton
- George S. Patton (attorney) (1856–1927), American attorney, businessman and politician, father of World War II general George S. Patton
- George B. Patton (1898–1987), American attorney and politician, North Carolina Attorney General
- George Patton IV (1923–2004), a major general in the United States Army who served in the Korean War and the Vietnam War, the son of World War II general George S. Patton
- George Patton, Lord Glenalmond (1803–1869), Scottish politician and judge

== See also ==
- George Paton (disambiguation)
