= Ernest E. L. Hammer =

American lawyer, politician, and judge

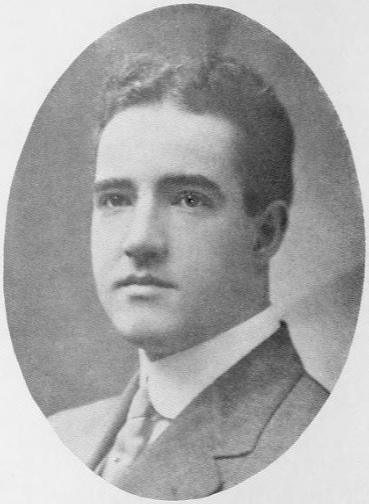

Justice of the New York Supreme Court
- In office 1926–1954

Member of the New York State Assembly
- In office 1913

Personal details
- Born: December 17, 1884 New York, New York, US
- Died: March 10, 1970 (aged 85) Patchogue, New York, US
- Resting place: Gate of Heaven Cemetery
- Party: Democratic
- Education: University of Notre Dame; New York Law School
- Occupation: Lawyer, politician, judge

Ernest E. L. Hammer (December 17, 1884 – March 10, 1970) was an American lawyer, politician, and judge from New York.

== Life ==
Hammer was born on December 17, 1884, in the Harlem neighborhood of New York City, the son of Ernest E. Hammer and Catherine C. Tyrrell.

Hammer lived in the Bronx starting in 1890, where his father worked as a builder and consultant. He attended St. Jerome's School and graduated from St. Francis Xavier High School, the University of Notre Dame in Indiana with an A.B., and New York Law School with an LL.B. He was admitted to the bar in 1906 and began practicing law, handling important litigated and business transactions in the Bronx. He was a member of the law firm Healy & Hammer with former Assistant Corporation Counsel Ellsworth J. Healy, with law offices at 37 Liberty Street in Manhattan. He was chairman of the Committee on Legislation of the Democratic County General Committee of the County of the Bronx. In 1912, he was elected to the New York State Assembly as a Democrat, representing the 35th District. He served in the Assembly in 1913.

In the Assembly, Hammer was active in supporting numerous labor reform laws. When the Bronx became a county in 1914, he was appointed Public Administrator. He served in that office until 1926, when he was elected Justice of the New York Supreme Court. He was re-elected to the Court in 1940 and 1954 with endorsements from all political parties. As Justice, he presided over, among other notable cases, the proceedings that led to the extradition of Richard Hauptmann to New Jersey, where Hauptmann was later put to death for the Lindbergh kidnapping. He also presided over various labor-management proceedings, with the head of the state's American Federation of Labor praising his pro-labor stance at one point. He served on the court until he reached the statutory retirement age of 70 in 1954. He began residing in Bayport during the summer in 1924, and in March 1969 he moved to Sayville.

Active in promoting the growth of the Bronx, Hammer was a charter member of the Bronx Rotary Club, the Board of Trade, and the Chamber of Commerce. He helped plan the Concourse Plaza Hotel, the first hotel in the borough, and headed a committee that planned the Bronx County Building. He became a trustee for the Lavelle School for the Blind in 1928, and from 1951 to 1966 he served as president of the board. A notable Catholic layman, he received Papal appointments as a Knight of Malta and Knight of the Holy Sepulchre, was rewarded with the Pro Ecclesia et Pontifice and the Gold Cross of Jerusalem, and served as president of the board of governors of the Catholic Lawyers Guild.

Hammer was an executive committee member of the Fordham Club and chairman of its public improvements committee. He was a member of the Sedgwick Club, the North End Democratic Club, the Notre Dame Club of New York, the Cardinal's Committee of Laity, the Friendly Sons of St. Patrick, the Catholic Club, the American Bar Association, the New York State Bar Association, the New York City Bar Association, the Bronx County Bar Association, the American Museum of Art, and the N.D.U. Alumni Association. He was also honorary life president of the Lacedaemonian Society and a fourth degree master of the Knights of Columbus, and received an honorary LL.D. degree from Manhattan College in 1953 and an honorary degree from Notre Dame in 1954. He was married to Alice M. Prendergast, niece of Archbishop of Philadelphia Edmond Francis Prendergast. Their children were Rev. Edmond F. P., Ernest E. L., Jeanne, and Harry F. X. Hammer

Hammer died in Brookhaven Memorial Hospital in Patchogue on March 10, 1970. He is buried in Gate of Heaven Cemetery.

New York State Assembly
Preceded by John Yule	New York State Assembly; New York County, 35th District; 1913	Succeeded by Henry D. Patton
