= Patton Island =

Patton Island may refer to:

- Patton Island (Alabama), an island in Lauderdale County
- Patton Island (Alaska), an island in Aleutians East Borough
