= Henry D. Patton =

American politician (c.1876–1966)

- Born: c. 1876; Pittsburgh, Pennsylvania
- Died: March 21, 1966
- Education: Western Maryland College
- Occupations: Lawyer and politician

Henry Deford Patton (c. 1876 – March 21, 1966) was an American lawyer and politician from New York.

== Life ==
He was born about 1876 in Pittsburgh, Pennsylvania. He attended high school in Caldwell, New Jersey. He graduated A.B. from Western Maryland College in 1898, and LL.B. from New York Law School. He was admitted to the bar in 1903, and practiced law in the Bronx.

In November 1913, Patton was elected as a Progressive, with Republican and Independence League endorsement, to the New York State Assembly (New York Co., 35th D.). He was a member of the 137th New York State Legislature in 1914.

In November 1914, he ran on the Progressive, Republican and Independence League tickets for re-election, but was defeated by Democrat Joseph M. Callahan. Callahan polled 8,787 votes, and Patton polled 7,399.

In 1916, Patton was appointed as an Acting City Magistrate to sit on the bench for thirty days while Magistrate Matthew P. Breen was ill.

Patton died on March 21, 1966, in New York Hospital in Manhattan.

New York State Assembly
Preceded by Ernest E. L. Hammer	New York State Assembly; New York County, 35th District; 1914	Succeeded by Joseph M. Callahan
