= Pattiesmuir =

Village in Fife, Scotland

Coordinates: 56°02′14″N 3°27′17″W

Pattiesmuir (formerly Pettimuir, Pettymuir and also known as Patiemuir, Patiesmuir and Peattie Muir) is a small, dormitory hamlet located in the west of Fife, in Scotland. It lies west of Rosyth and south west of Dunfermline.

== History ==
Originally Pettymuir began as an agricultural hamlet in the 17th century although there has been evidence discovered of prehistory settlements from the Bronze Age. During the late 18th and early 19th centuries Pettymuir underwent a spike in population as the hamlet expanded to house hand weavers, with linen becoming a growing industry in West Fife during this period. The advent of the industrial age and the invention of the power loom then sent the Pattiesmuir population, from a peak of 190 in 1857, into decline. At its peak the hamlet had a blacksmiths, a college and three public wells. The hamlet was assigned conservation status in 1974.

== Douglas Bank Cemetery ==
Directly to the north west is Douglas Bank Cemetery where a number of war graves from the 1st and 2nd World Wars are situated. There are also graves of some servicemen who have lost their lives in subsequent conflicts.

== The College and Andrew Carnegie ==
For more than 200 years, a building known as The college has existed in the hamlet. One of its members, Andrew Carnegie known as The Professor, was grandfather of philanthropist Andrew Carnegie who later was to emigrate to America and make his great wealth in the steel industry during rapid industrialization. Until recently it acted as a community hub. The college was repurposed in 2022 and is now rented to a business.

== Development controversy (1912) ==
A two-story building was added to house workers from nearby Rosyth Dockyard. After much controversy due to size and scale not being in keeping with the rest of the hamlet further planned buildings of the same type were never built.

== Development controversy (2022) ==
In 2022 local builder, Premier Homes (Scotland) Ltd, commenced work on building eight new properties to fill in gap sites within the hamlet. Local residents had raised concerns about size and scale of the proposed properties during the planning phase in a conservation area, amongst other concerns including wildlife habitat loss and access issues. A blog was created to catalogue the progress of the development by a resident. There was an escalation, with the developer accusing residents of a "smear campaign" in the local press.
