= Patton Park (Detroit) =

Park located in Detroit, Michigan

- Interactive map of Patton Park
- Type: City Park
- Location: Detroit, Michigan
- Coordinates: 42°18′34″N 83°08′20″W
- Area: 93 acres (38 ha)

Patton Park is a 93-acre (38 ha) park located on the southwest side of Detroit, Michigan. The park, named for the World War II US military leader General George S. Patton, was dedicated in the early 1950s. Local landowner Jacques Baby bequeathed the 93-acre (38 ha) tract of land to the City of Detroit for a park. The park retains a restrictive covenant that prohibits the City from tampering with the park, lest the park returns to Baby's descendants.

The Patton Park Recreation Center opening was attended by Queen Juliana of the Netherlands, as a gesture of the Netherlands' thanks.

Patton Park gained attention during the 1967 race riots, when a landing strip was hastily constructed to bring in National Guard supplies. A National Guard camp was also established at Patton Park.

== Renovation ==
The Patton Recreation Center underwent major renovation in 1978 that shut the recreation center for two years. During that time, the original gym floor was replaced, the stage-theater was demolished and sealed off, and the locker rooms were partially renovated. The recreation center underwent another renovation in 2002 that saw the closure of the recreation center for three years. The most recent renovation was a $10 million effort, paid for through Detroit’s Water & Sewerage Department (D.W.S.D.), through an agreement with Detroit’s Recreation Department, who agreed to give up a portion of Patton Park to D.W.S.D. for the construction of a combined sewer overflow retention facility, attached directly to the D.W.S.D.’s existing Woodmere Pumping Station, also located within Patton Park.

In 2006, an effort was undertaken to create a paved, asphalt trail along the Dix Road side of Patton Park. The effort was years in the planning and cost $9 million. The trail starts at the corner of Norman and Woodmere Streets (nearest the northern point of Patton Park and heads south along Dix Road to the park’s end at Dale St. The trail ends at Vernor Highway, nearest Riverside Drive (along Woodmere Cemetery). It has been further improved with three decorative park benches, garbage containers and numerous tree plantings throughout. Additional tree plantings have since been carried out along the trail by the Greening of Detroit conservancy group. A similar campaign was used for nearby Lapeer Park in Dearborn, complete with an extended trail, directional signs and landscaping. This trail has become an anchor for the Southwest Detroit Greenways Link, a series of bicycle paths/dedicated roadway lanes from Lapeer Park, Patton Park, through Vernor Highway, connecting to other networks of bike lanes in Detroit's Mexicantown and Corktown neighborhoods.
