= Parc Erissey =

Coordinates: 50.254°N 5.237°W

- Location within Cornwall
- OS grid reference: SW693444
- Unitary authority: Cornwall
- Ceremonial county: Cornwall
- Region: South West
- Country: England
- Sovereign state: United Kingdom

Parc Erissey is a hamlet north of Redruth, Cornwall, England.
