= Parkway, Herefordshire =

Hamlet in Herefordshire, England

Coordinates: 52.02°N 2.41°W

Parkway
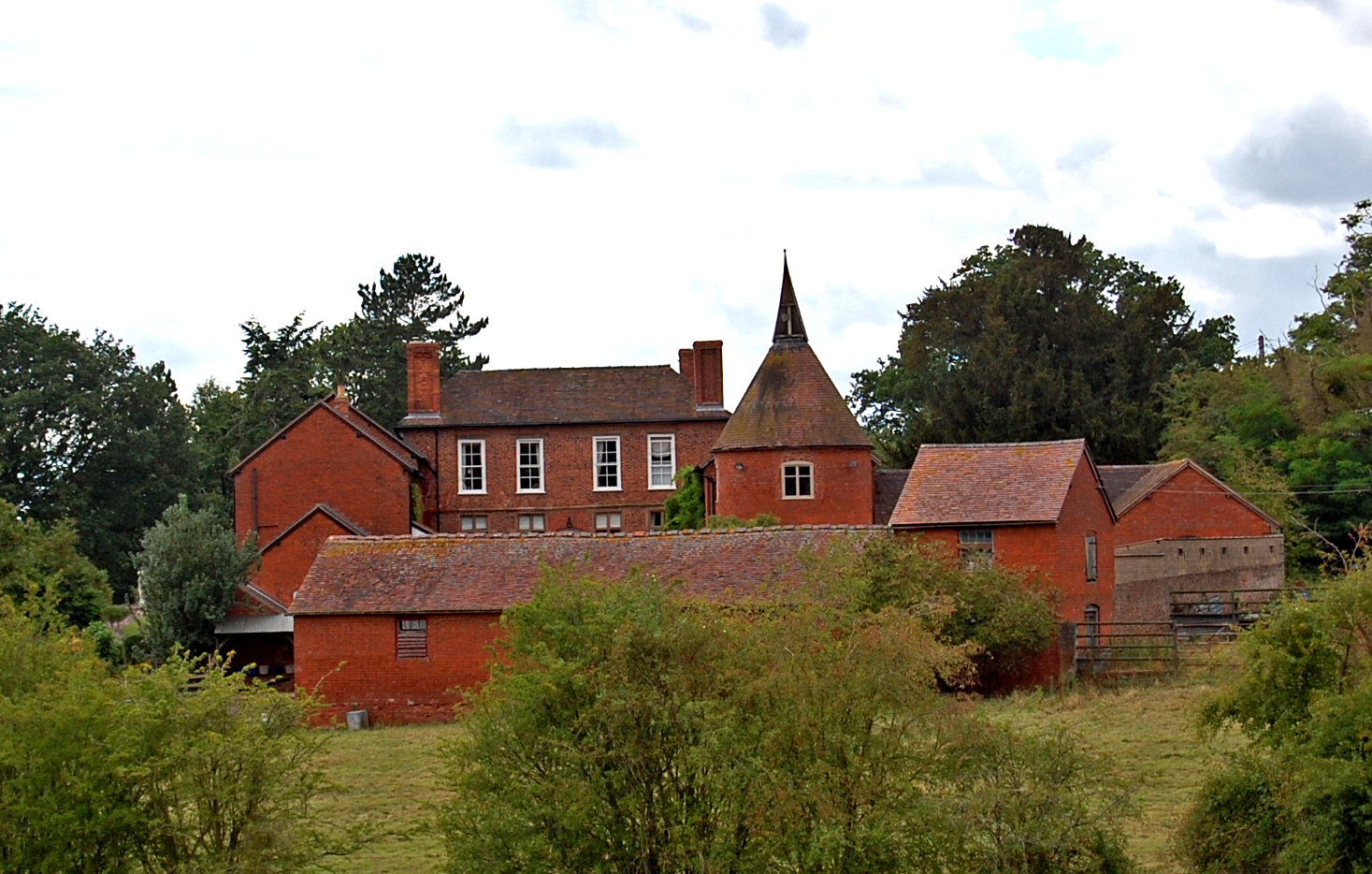
- Dingwood Park Farmhouse is associated with the district and the origin of Parkway Corner in turn the derivation of the locality's name

- Location within Herefordshire
- Population: 100 (less than) (2011)
- OS grid reference: SO719358
- Civil parish: Ledbury
- Unitary authority: Herefordshire
- Region: West Midlands
- Country: England
- Sovereign state: United Kingdom
- Post town: Ledbury
- Postcode district: HR8
- Dialling code: 01531
- Police: West Mercia
- Fire: Hereford and Worcester
- Ambulance: West Midlands
- UK Parliament: North Herefordshire

Parkway is a hamlet centred 2 km (1.2 mi) south of the market town of Ledbury in Herefordshire, England, centred on the direct single-carriageway north-south A417 main approach to the town from the M50 motorway. Parkway is sparsely populated and its land mainly consists of woodland, heathland, five mainly arable farms with farm houses and about 25 other houses.

The place derives its name from Parkway Corner, itself from adjoining Dingwood Park, "a house about 1 1/2 mile south south-east of Ledbury church, two storeys tall with a basement; the walls of which are brick with stone dressings and the roofs tiled. It was built late in the 17th century on a square plan with a small projecting wing on the south-east This wing was subsequently extended to the east." It is a listed building in the middle category, Grade II*.

Parkway had in the 20th century a hall used to host table tennis matches and local meetings. The locality is the extreme south of the ecclesiastical and civil parish (town council area) of Ledbury.

Hospital Wood immediately east of a brief section the middle section of the main road and spreading a little further north and south is home to wildlife such as pine martens, deer, foxes and a variety of birds. Parkway has a garage.
