= Van Patten =

Van Patten is a surname.

Notable people with the surname include:

- Dick Van Patten (1928–2015), American actor
- Don Van Patten (born 1966), American politician
- Joyce Van Patten (born 1934), American actress
- Philip Van Patten (1852–1918), American socialist activist
- Sarah Van Patten (born 1984), American ballet dancer
- Tim Van Patten (born 1959), American television director, actor, screenwriter, and producer
- Vincent Van Patten (born 1957), American actor and former tour professional tennis player
- William J. Van Patten (1848–1920), American businessman and politician

== See also ==
- John B. Van Petten (1827–1908), Union Army general and New York state senator
