= Pathlow, Warwickshire =

Coordinates: 52.22442°N 1.74230°W

Pathlow is a hamlet in the English county of Warwickshire. Pathlow lies to the east of the village of Wilmcote (where the population is included) some three miles north from Stratford-upon-Avon.
