= Parciau =

Hamlet on Anglesey, Wales

Coordinates: 53.333196°N 4.263273°W

- Location within Anglesey
- OS grid reference: SH 4939 8420
  - Cardiff: 136 mi (219 km)
  - London: 215 mi (346 km)
- Community: Llaneugrad
- Principal area: Anglesey
- Country: Wales
- Sovereign state: United Kingdom
- Post town: Marianglas
- Police: North Wales
- Fire: North Wales
- Ambulance: Welsh
- UK Parliament: Ynys Môn
- Senedd Cymru – Welsh Parliament: Ynys Môn

Parciau is a hamlet in the community of Llaneugrad, Anglesey, Wales, which is 136 miles (218.9 km) from Cardiff and 215 miles (346.1 km) from London.

== See also ==
- List of localities in Wales by population
