= Ian Paton =

Ian Paton may refer to:

- Ian Paton (footballer) (born 1957), Australian rules footballer
- Ian Paton (politician), Canadian politician
- Ian Paton (bishop) (born 1957), British Anglican bishop
