= John Patten =

John Patten is the name of:

- John Patten (American politician) (1746–1800), American soldier and politician from Delaware
- Jack Patten (1905–1957), Australian Aboriginal civil rights leader and journalist
- Johnny Jarrett (born John Patten, 1936–2020), Australian Aboriginal boxer and community leader
- John Patten, Baron Patten (born 1945), British Conservative politician
- John Patten (frontiersman) (1725-1754) Pennsylvania fur trader who mapped eastern Labrador

== See also ==
- John Paton (disambiguation)
- John Patton (disambiguation)
