= Paramoor =

Hamlet in Cornwall, England

Coordinates: 50°18′34″N 4°50′47″W

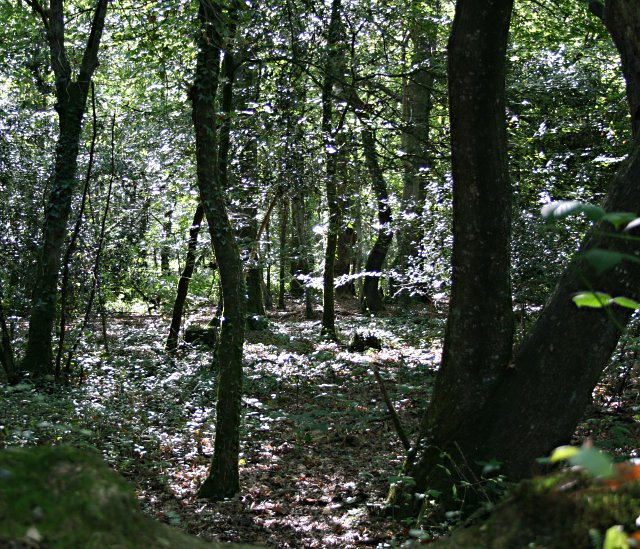
Paramoor Wood

Paramoor is a hamlet near St Mewan in Cornwall, England. Paramoor is southwest of Sticker and Paramoor Wood is nearby.
