= Park Bottom =

Hamlet in Cornwall, England

Coordinates: 50.236°N 5.270°W

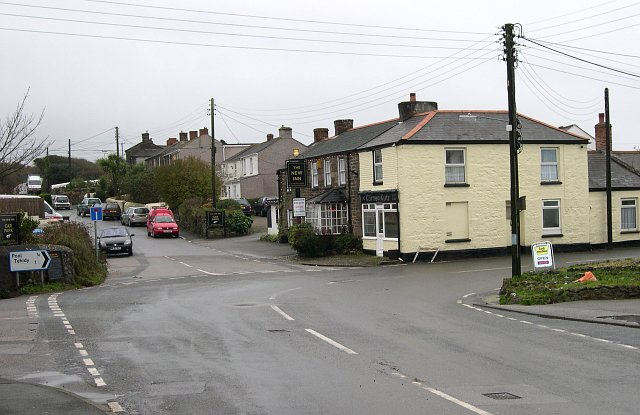
- Park Bottom

- Location within Cornwall
- OS grid reference: SW669425
- Civil parish: Illogan
- Unitary authority: Cornwall
- Ceremonial county: Cornwall
- Region: South West
- Country: England
- Sovereign state: United Kingdom

Park Bottom is a hamlet north of Pool and near Illogan in west Cornwall, England. The village centers around one junction in the lower part of the town. This 5-way junction has roads leading to Camborne, Illogan, Portreath and Pool. The village has three commercial buildings in the centre, a Premier convenience store, a pub called The New Inn and a hair salon.
