= Paynter's Cross =

Hamlet in Cornwall, England

Coordinates: 50.456°N 4.257°W

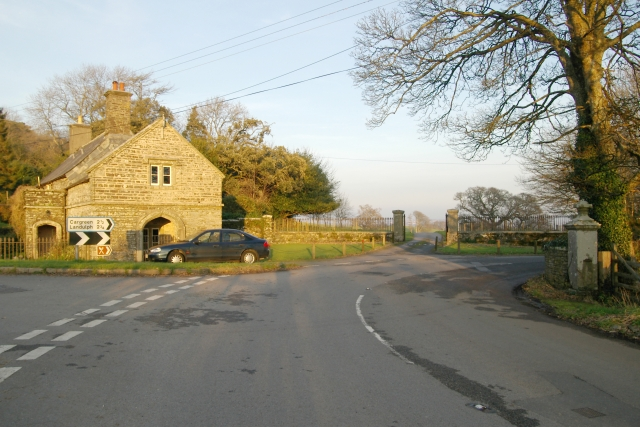
Entrance to Pentillie Castle, Paynter's Cross

Paynter's Cross is a hamlet on the A388 main road southeast of St Mellion in southeast Cornwall, England, UK.
