= George Henry Tatham Paton =

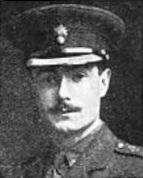
- Born: 3 October 1895; Innellan, Argyllshire, Scotland
- Died: 1 December 1917 (aged 22); Gonnelieu, France
- Burial place: Metz-en-Couture Communal Cemetery, British Extension
- Military career
- Allegiance: United Kingdom
- Branch: British Army
- Service years: September 1914 – December 1917
- Rank: Captain
- Units: 2/17th Bn London Regiment; Grenadier Guards
- Conflicts: World War I †
- Awards: Victoria Cross; Military Cross

George Henry Tatham Paton VC MC (3 October 1895 – 1 December 1917) was a Scottish recipient of the Victoria Cross, the highest and most prestigious award for gallantry in the face of the enemy that can be awarded to British and Commonwealth forces. Paton was the first Grenadier Guards officer to win the VC since the Crimean War.

== Early life ==
He was born to George William Paton who was Deputy Chairman and Managing Director of Messrs Bryant and May Ltd. He was educated at Rottingdean School, then, from September 1909 to April 1914 at Clifton College Bristol.

== Military career ==
During his time as a student, Paton had participated in the Officer Training Corps and obtained a Certificate "A" military proficiency award. He was commissioned in his local Territorial Force unit on 1 October 1914. He continued to serve with 2/17th Battalion London Regiment in the UK throughout 1915.

At the end of 1915 he applied for a Special Reserve commission in the Grenadier Guards. This was accepted, and he was appointed on 28 January 1916. He was posted to the Western Front and disembarked on 8 July 1916. His exploits at the Battle of Pilckem Ridge on 31 July 1917 resulted in being awarded the Military Cross.

Paton was 22 years old, and an acting captain in the 4th Battalion, Grenadier Guards, British Army during the First World War when the following deed took place for which he was awarded the VC.

On 1 December 1917 at Gonnelieu, France, when a unit on Captain Paton's left was driven back, thus leaving his flank in the air and his company practically surrounded, he walked up and down adjusting the line, within 50 yards of the enemy, under a withering fire. He personally removed several wounded men and was the last to leave the village. Later he again adjusted the line and when the enemy counter-attacked four times, each time sprang on to the parapet, deliberately risking his life, in order to stimulate his men. He was eventually mortally wounded.

== The medal ==
His Victoria Cross is displayed at The Guards Museum within Guards Regimental Headquarters (Grenadier Guards RHQ) at Wellington Barracks, London.
