= Patton, West Virginia =

- Unincorporated community
- Location within West Virginia Location within the United States
- Coordinates: 37°41′31″N 80°29′15″W
- Country: United States
- State: West Virginia
- Counties: Greenbrier and Monroe
- Elevation: 1,759 ft (536 m)
- Time zone: UTC-5 (Eastern (EST))
  - Summer (DST): UTC-4 (EDT)
- Area codes: 304 & 681
- GNIS feature ID: 1555315

Patton is an unincorporated community in Greenbrier and Monroe counties, West Virginia, United States. Patton is east of Alderson.
