= Paynter's Lane End =

Hamlet in Cornwall, England

Coordinates: 50°14′41″N 5°15′59″W

Paynter's Lane End is a hamlet in the parish of Illogan, Cornwall, England.
