= Bartolomé Jiménez Patón =

Spanish humanist, rhetorician, grammarian and writer

Bartolomé Jiménez Patón (1569–1640) was a Spanish humanist, rhetorician, grammarian, and writer. In 1614, he published a treatise of comparative orthography between Latin and Castilian Spanish, Epítome de la orthografía latina y castellana.
