= Certificate "A" =

British military proficiency award

Certificate "A" was a British military proficiency award originally used by the university cadet corps. It was associated initially with a more advanced Certificate "B", the holding of which, gave entry into the Special Reserve of Officers or the Territorial Force as an officer. Certificate "A" was at the level of basic training. The certificates were recognized by the War Office in 1908. This was extended to other cadet corps during the World War I (1914–1918). These cadet corps were mainly in secondary and public schools, until 1942 when the Army Cadet Force came into being. By the middle of the 1930s, Certificate "A" was the aim of every new cadet.

In 1990 the Army Cadet Force implemented the Army Proficiency Certificate (APC) syllabus which overhauled the activities which the cadets undertook including dropping the requirement for some modules such as hand-to-hand combat. The APC syllabus covered subjects such as: Skill at Arms, Fieldcraft and First aid.

== Scope of training ==
To obtain the certificate, both military and fitness tests had to be passed. In 1942, the military test consisted of:

- Drill
- Weapon training
- Range Work requiring a minimum score with .22 rifle
- Map reading
- Command, including drill commands
- Battle drill (elementary 7 tactical exercises)

The fitness tests varied according to local facilities, but included running; rope work; wall climbing; an endurance test; water ability (either swimming or treading water). Some units had more tests but these were not listed on the reverse of the certificate.

== Award ==
The certificate award was often made at a parade of the cadet's unit and consisted of the certificate and a four-pointed star with a red centre to be sewn on the lower sleeve. During World War II, having the award reduced the time of preliminary training after conscription call-up, and was said to be a help in advancing to become an NCO.
