= Parkengear =

Hamlet in Cornwall, England

Coordinates: 50.288°N 4.944°W

- Location within Cornwall
- OS grid reference: SW904473
- Civil parish: Probus
- Unitary authority: Cornwall
- Ceremonial county: Cornwall
- Region: South West
- Country: England
- Sovereign state: United Kingdom

Parkengear is a hamlet in the parish of Probus, Cornwall, England.
