= Operations in the Kohat Pass (1850) =

Kohat Pass Expedition
| Date | February – November 1850 |
| Location | Kohat, Pakistan |
| Result | British victory |

Belligerents
| British Empire | Afridi Tribesmen |

Commanders and leaders
| Brig. Sir C. Campbell | Unknown |

Strength
| 1,600 Soldiers 1,600 Tribal Militia Two Mortars | Several Thousand |

Casualties and losses
| 19 killed 74 wounded | Unknown |

The Operations in the Kohat Pass was a British-Indian military expedition to the North-West Frontier Province in Pakistan.
