= Patton Island (Alaska) =

Island in Aleutians East Borough, Alaska, USA

Coordinates: 54.902303°N 162.141616°W

Patton Island is an island in Aleutians East Borough, Alaska, in the United States.

Patton Island was named for Admiral Raymond S. Patton, an official of the U.S. Coast and Geodetic Survey.
