= Michael Paton (disambiguation) =

Michael Paton (born 1989) is a Scottish footballer (Aberdeen FC, Brechin City FC, Stockport County FC and Queen of the South FC)

Michael Paton may also refer to:

- Michael Paton (Dumbarton footballer) (fl. 1883–1886), Scottish footballer (Dumbarton FC and Scotland)
- Michael Paton (priest) (1922–2016), Anglican priest (Archdeacon of Sheffield)
