= Robert T. Paton =

Australian public health officer

Robert Thomson (Note: Although Paton's middle name was Thomson, "Thompson" was the predominant spelling in newspaper reports, and on the official document Paton signed testifying to the death by hanging of Jimmy Governor at Darlinghurst Gaol on 18 January 1901. His son A. A. Paton spelled it "Thompson" when he enlisted with the First AIF in 1918.) Paton (16 March 1856 – 17 February 1929) was a medical doctor who served as Director-General of Public Health for New South Wales from 1913 to 1921.

== Biography ==
Caricature by David Low

Paton was born at historic Portobello Castle, Edinburgh, a son of John Govan Stewart Paton, carver and gilder, and his wife Catherine Paton, née Thomson. The family claimed descent from Captain John Paton, a martyr to the Covenanter cause, and closely related to the Paton family of Alloa, cotton spinners, later Paton & Baldwins Ltd.

He completed one year of a medical course at the Edinburgh University before in 1876 leaving for Australia, where he worked as a doctor's assistant in Bathurst and Wallsend and sailed extensively through the South Sea Islands in a yacht which he part-owned.

In 1884 he returned to Edinburgh and completed the course, becoming an FRCS and LRCS. He returned to Australia and entered into general practice, then joined the public service as a medical officer at Trial Bay prison. Subsequent appointments include:

- Government Medical Officer and Vaccinator for Sydney, replacing Dr. Strong, 1891.
- Police Surgeon and Government Medical Officer (1895).
- Medical Officer, Darlinghurst Gaol; certified the death by hanging of Stuart Wilson Christopher Briggs in 1899 death by hanging of Jimmy Governor on 18 January 1901, and the death in custody of George Harris in 1905.

Paton and Dr J. B. Nash MLC were sent to Wollongong hospital by special train immediately after the Mount Kembla coalmine disaster of July 1902 to help treat miners suffering from "afterdamp" (a carbon monoxide mixture) inhalation, the cause of most of the 93 deaths.

- Inspector General of Hospitals and Charities (1912)
- Director-General of Public Health 1913–1921, when he retired, then became medical superintendent for Anthony Hordern, a position he held until his death.
- Commissioner under Venereal Diseases Act of 1918 (1919)

He was awarded the CMG in 1922.

His remains were ashed at Rookwood Crematorium and presumably disposed of "in the most economic manner possible" as directed in his will.

== Family ==
Paton married Janet Tritschler (born 1857) in Leytonstone, Essex, on 1 July 1886. Their children included:

- Dr. James Thomson Paton (1887–1960) married Gertrude Maiden on 18 October 1912.
- Doris Ainslie Paton (1892–1956)
- Noel Ainslie Paton (7 December 1894 – 1956) served overseas in WWI; wounded; enlisted with RAAF in WWII.
- Dr Robert Thomson Paton (21 May 1897 – 7 September 1934) married Eileen Mary Shard on 15 March 1928.
- Allan Ainslie Paton (4 November 1899 – 5 August 1941) enlisted 1918
- Hilda Ainslie Paton (1902–1915)
- Hew Lindsay Paton (14 November 1907 – 1977) married Sheila

They had a home on O'Sullivan Road, Rose Bay, in 1928; Wentworth Street, Point Piper in 1929.
