= Parkgate, Dumfries and Galloway =

Coordinates: 55.173°N 3.544°W

Parkgate
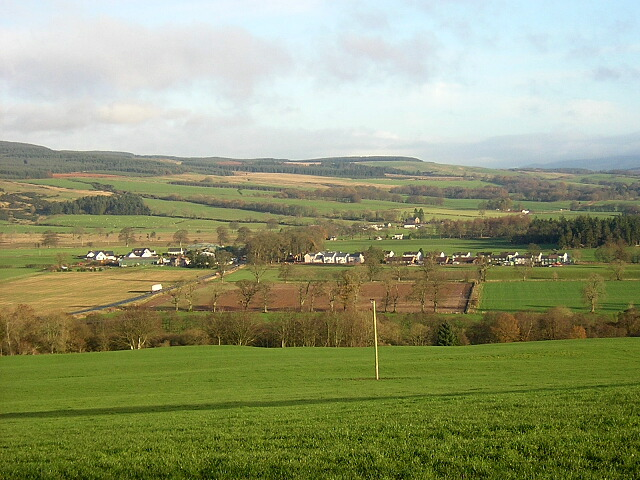

- Location within Dumfries and Galloway
- Council area: Dumfries and Galloway
- Lieutenancy area: Dumfries
- Country: Scotland
- Sovereign state: United Kingdom
- Post town: DUMFRIES
- Postcode district: DG1
- Dialling code: 01387
- Police: Scotland
- Fire: Scottish
- Ambulance: Scottish
- UK Parliament: Dumfriesshire, Clydesdale and Tweeddale
- Scottish Parliament: Dumfries

Parkgate is a small village in Dumfries and Galloway, Scotland. The village centre is located just to the east of the A701 approximately 8 miles (13 km) north of Dumfries and a few miles east of the Forest of Ae. There is a small primary school located one mile to the east of the village.

Parkgate formerly had a Post Office and an inn, the Ae Inn, both of which are now closed. The village is situated in the former parish of Kirkmichael, and Kirkmichael Church is about one mile to the west. Services continue to be held in the Church, albeit not every week. The village is home to two main businesses: Clark Tracks, an engineering business focused on the forestry sector, and James Glen, Motor Engineers. In addition, immediately to the east of the village is the former Barony College, now Barony Campus, one of four campuses comprising Scotland's Rural College ("SRUC").

The village is served by buses which run between Dumfries, Moffat and Glasgow. The bus service from Dumfries to Edinburgh via Moffat also serves the village.
