= Patton Bridge =

Hamlet in Cumbria, England

Coordinates: 54.370°N 2.683°W

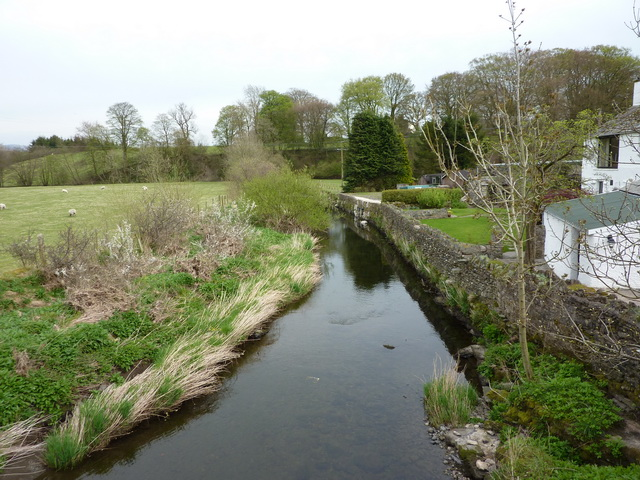
- River Mint, Patton Bridge

- Location in South Lakeland Location within Cumbria
- OS grid reference: SD556973
- Civil parish: Whinfell
- Unitary authority: Westmorland and Furness
- Ceremonial county: Cumbria
- Region: North West
- Country: England
- Sovereign state: United Kingdom
- Post town: KENDAL
- Postcode district: LA8
- Dialling code: 01539
- Police: Cumbria
- Fire: Cumbria
- Ambulance: North West
- UK Parliament: Westmorland and Lonsdale

Patton Bridge is a hamlet in Westmorland, located approximately 5 miles (8 km) from the outskirts of Kendal, Cumbria, England. Its post code region is LA8.
