= Robert Paton (chemist) =

- Born: Stockport
- Occupation: Chemist
- Known for: chemistry
- Awards: Harrison-Meldola Memorial Prize (2015)
- Website: patonlab.com

Robert Paton won the 2015 Harrison-Meldola Memorial Prize awarded by the Royal Society of Chemistry. Up to three Harrison-Meldola Memorial Prizes are awarded each year. Paton received the OpenEye Outstanding Junior Faculty Award from the American Chemical Society COMP division in fall 2015.

Paton was formerly an associate professor in organic chemistry at the University of Oxford and a Fellow of St Hilda's College. Since 2018, He has been a professor at the Colorado State University in Fort Collins, Colorado. Paton is the inaugural holder of the Marshall Fixman & Branka Ladanyi Professorship at Colorado State University.
