= Pathhead =

Area of Kirkcaldy, Fife, Scotland

Coordinates: 56°07′15″N 3°08′47″W

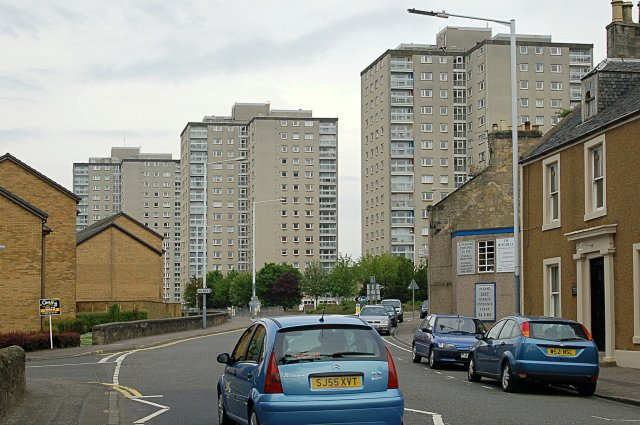
A roundabout in Pathhead

Pathhead (Scots: Paithheid) is an area of Kirkcaldy, in Fife, Scotland. Pathhead was an independent village before it was incorporated into the Royal burgh of Kirkcaldy.

In Jan Blaeu's map of Scotland from the 17th century reference is made to the village of Peth-heed, present day Pathhead. With the Firth of Forth to the south, Kirkcaldy to the 'west', Dysart to the east, and Gallatown, Sinclairtown and Dunnikier to the north. According to Robert Brodie's Historical Sketches of Pathhead and Vicinity,

"Whatever time it may have begun to appear as a town, we know from good authority that in 1666 there were eighty houses in it. The estate had passed through a number of hands; but, notwithstanding, the feuers had evidently been increasing in numbers. In that year, John Watson, sen., went to law with the feuers for the purpose of depriving them of their privilege of taking stones and clay, fail and divet, from the whole muir of Dunnikier, which they had enjoyed since the year 1608."

The town houses the historic Ravenscraig Castle commissioned by James II in 1460; many of the former premises of the Nairn's Linoleum Factories; and, the Manse in which both O. Douglas and John Buchan grew up. Historically, the village was a centre for nailmaking, Adam Smith's "very trifling manufacture" inspiring his division of labour principle from An Inquiry into the Nature and Causes of the Wealth of Nations (1776). It looks out over the neglected Pathhead Sands, and industry today is centred on Hutchison's Flour Mill and the Forbo-Nairn Plant.

The historic centre of Pathhead is a trio of streets running parallel with the coast: Nether Street, Mid Street and what used to be Back Street, now Commercial Street. Water was supplied from wells at either end of Mid Street and vibrant commerce was centred on the Pathhead and Sinclairtown Reform Co-operative Society of present-day Branning Court, which was established in 1914.

Ecclesiastical life focuses on Pathhead Parish Church, a Dysart extension and in addition to the many extant churches, the village once hosted the now demolished Pathhead West, Millie Street Free Church, United Reform and the stately Loughborough Road Main Church.

Kirkcaldy YWCA has acquired the Pathhead Halls.
