= Ecclesiastical Household =

Part of the British Royal Household

Members of the Ecclesiastical Household (including the Serjeant of the Vestry, the Dean and Sub-Dean of the Chapels Royal and a Chaplain to the King) on duty for the National Service of Remembrance, 2025.

The Ecclesiastical Household is part of the Royal Household of the sovereign of the United Kingdom. The term 'Ecclesiastical Household' (in official use) dates only from the 1920s, but its component structures and personnel have been part of the Royal Household for centuries.

Reflecting the constitutional position of the Church of Scotland within Scotland, the Royal Household in Scotland makes its own ecclesiastical arrangements (see below for details).

== Present day ==
The Ecclesiastical Household (outside Scotland) is made up of two main elements: the College of Chaplains and the Chapels Royal; the former is overseen by the Clerk of the Closet, the latter by the Dean of the Chapels Royal. Separate from the Ecclesiastical Household, but closely associated with it, is the Royal Almonry, overseen by the Lord High Almoner. The Clerk of the Closet, Dean of the Chapels Royal and Lord High Almoner are all prelates and have equal rank and precedence within the Household.

The sole full-time clerical member of the Royal Household is Canon Paul Wright, who currently serves as Deputy Clerk of the Closet, Sub-Dean of the Chapels Royal and Sub-Almoner, as well as being Domestic Chaplain (Buckingham Palace). These roles have been held by an individual cleric since 1931.

=== College of Chaplains ===
An establishment of thirty-six Chaplains is maintained. At one time the chaplains were expected to be in attendance (on rotation) at the royal court, but today the role is for the most part an honorary one (although each Chaplain is invited to preach once a year at the Chapel Royal, St James's Palace).

The College of Chaplains is overseen by the Clerk of the Closet, a position normally held by a serving diocesan bishop (who may however remain in office for a time after leaving his or her See). The current clerk is Richard Jackson, Bishop of Hereford. The Clerk of the Closet is responsible for advising the Private Secretary to the Sovereign on the names for candidates to fill vacancies in the Roll of Chaplains to the Sovereign. He or she also presents newly elected diocesan bishops for homage to the sovereign, and examines any theological books to be presented to the sovereign. He receives a salary of £7 a year.

=== Chapels Royal ===
The Chapels Royal in England are: the Queen's Chapel and the Chapel Royal (both at St James's Palace); the Chapel Royal, Hampton Court Palace; the Chapel Royal of St Peter ad Vincula and St John's Chapel (both at the Tower of London); and The King's Chapel of the Savoy. Since the 18th century, the Bishop of London has usually served as Dean of the Chapels Royal.

The two chapels at St James's Palace are administered directly by the Sub-Dean of the Chapels Royal; the others have their own chaplains. In addition, Domestic Chaplains are appointed for the principal royal residences (Buckingham Palace, Windsor Castle and Sandringham).

The Gentlemen and Children of the Chapel Royal sing choral services at St James's Palace on Sundays and holy days. The Sub-Dean of the Chapels Royal is assisted in his or her duties there by two Priests-in-Ordinary, who hold the appointment alongside another ministry: they attend on monthly rotation and assist the Sub-Dean in presiding at statutory services and in the pastoral care of members of the Royal Household.

== History ==
=== Medieval ===
Ecclesiastics have been part of Royal Households in Britain since Saxon times. By the time of the Norman Conquest, clerics (or 'clerks'), as literate members of the Household, formed a sophisticated writing office for the king (as well as fulfilling sacred and sacramental duties). A snapshot of the Household in the time of Henry I is provided by the Constitutio domus regis (of c. 1135), in which the Chancellor is listed as the senior member of the Household: the Chancellor (whose office developed into that of Lord Chancellor) was at that time a senior cleric, who served as head both of the writing office and of the chapel.

By the time of Edward II, the three senior clerical members of the Household were listed (in Household Ordinances published in 1318) as the Confessor, Almoner and Chief Chaplain; the latter had under him five chaplains and six clerks. The Confessor was always a bishop. The office of 'dean of the king's chapel', in existence by 1349, took over the running of the chapel from the Chancellor (who was by that time no longer part of the Household). He also served as chief chaplain. On major feast days, the dean would celebrate high mass in the presence of the monarch (unless there happened to be a bishop present, in which case he would preside). These were always occasions of great solemnity, and on six days of the year (Christmas Day, the Epiphany, Easter Day, Whit Sunday, All Saints' Day and St Edward's day) the king and queen would wear their crowns and carry sceptres in the procession, accompanied by lords in 'distinctive apparel', one of whom would carry the sword of state and another the cap (or birretum).

The chapel was a moveable establishment, which accompanied the king and his court around the kingdom, and indeed abroad (including on military campaigns); in 1415, for example, under Edmund Lacey as dean, it accompanied Henry V to Agincourt, where mass was sung in the king's presence on the morning of the battle. The Serjeant (or Servant) of the Vestry is noted as having responsibility at this time for the carriage of ornaments, books, vessels and other items for the chapel, as it moved from place to place with the king and his royal court. Boy singers are recorded, with John Plummer later serving as their singing master. In the 1440s there were twenty-six chaplains and clerks in the Household, one of whom served as Clerk of the Closet (at that time a relatively junior position); the holder of this office later served as a close confidant of the monarch (by the 17th century the Clerk of the Closet was additionally described as 'Confessor to His Majesty'). In 1483 the Chapel Royal was incorporated by Edward IV as the 'Royal Free Chapel of the Household', with intention that the dean be assisted by three canons: a sub-dean, treasurer and precentor (albeit the king's death two months later meant that the scheme was never fully realised).

=== Early modern ===
At the Coronation of Henry VIII and Catherine of Aragon, the king was attended by his Grand Almoner and Under Almoner, the Confessor of the Household, the Dean and Sub-Dean of the chapel, seven chaplains and a gospeller, four epistolers, the Serjeant of the Vestry, the Clerk of the Closet, nineteen gentlemen and ten children of the chapel. The queen was also attended by her Confessor, two chaplains and the Clerk of the Queen's Closet. The epistolers were choristers whose voices had recently changed, who were kept on as yeomen of the chapel. The Eltham Ordinance of 1526 anticipated the more settled character of the future Chapel Royal, stipulating that, thenceforward, only a proportion of the personnel of Chapel Royal should accompany the king on his progresses or travels; the rest should remain in London, 'that there should be always some divine service in the Court, whereby men might be elected unto the devotion'.

During the reign of Edward VI, a cohort of twelve king's chaplains was appointed in order to promote Reformed doctrine across the kingdom: at any one time, two chaplains would be in attendance at court, while the other ten were seconded to preach around the country. In the 17th century the number of chaplains dramatically increased: Elizabeth I, at the time of her death, had 18; James I had 70 and Charles I no fewer than 140 (albeit only a core team of forty-eight Chaplains were ever 'in waiting': each being in attendance at court for a month at a time in groups of four; the rest were termed 'Chaplains Extraordinary' and had no actual duties). The early Stuart kings had envisioned a unified Anglican chapel royal across the three kingdoms of England, Scotland and Ireland; this was, however, firmly and effectively resisted in Scotland.

During the Civil War the Chapel Royal personnel were scattered. In the Commonwealth period the chapel at Whitehall had its organ, stained glass and paintings removed or destroyed, but it remained in use as a place of worship (two of Cromwell's daughters were married there). Following the Restoration the choral establishment was settled anew at the Palace of Whitehall, and Anglican services resumed; they continued to be held during the reign of James II, though he himself worshipped separately in a Roman Catholic chapel nearby.

Under Queen Anne there were forty-eight Chaplains-in-Ordinary and thirty-two Gentlemen of the Chapel Royal, twelve of whom were priests (precursors of the 'Priests-in-Ordinary') whose task was, by turns, to officiate at times of divine service. Chaplains (during their weeks in waiting) were required to preach 'in the Chapels on Sundays and other Festivals before the King, and in the Morning early on Sundays before the Household', and also 'to read Divine Service before the King out of Chapel daily, twice in the King’s private Oratory'. It also fell to them to give thanks before meals, in the absence of the Clerk of the Closet. The officers of the vestry (serjeant, yeomen and groom) functioned as vergers. Ordinarily, the Chaplains were the only people permitted to preach in the Chapel Royal, except on certain festival days (such as Easter Day and Whit Sunday, when the Lord High Almoner or his deputy customarily preached).

Lent was, by long tradition, marked with great solemnity in the chapel royal. During that season, the number of services was increased and the pattern of preaching changed: the Chaplains preached on Wednesdays (the Dean of the Chapel having preached on Ash Wednesday), Deans of Cathedrals and Collegiate churches were invited to preach on Fridays (with the Dean of Westminster always preaching on Good Friday) and Bishops preached, by invitation, on Sundays (with the Archbishop of Canterbury and the Archbishop of York preaching, each in alternate years, on Palm Sunday). In the Georgian period, the monarch's progress to and from chapel on Sundays and on major festivals was, in itself, a ceremonial event, with gentlemen pensioners, gentlemen ushers and serjeants-at-arms in attendance. On the twelve principal feast days (known as Collar Days), the monarch attended with greater ceremony and, after Divine Service, presented a byzant of gold at the altar (except on the Feast of Epiphany, when the offering took the form of gold, frankincense and myrrh). The dean was responsible for distributing these offerings among the poor of London; (in the 19th century they were replaced by an annual contribution from the Privy Purse).

In 1702, fire having destroyed the Palace of Whitehall, the headquarters of the Chapel Royal was moved to St James's Palace. (Choral services continued to be held at Whitehall in the Banqueting House, which was provided with a pair of Reading Chaplains and a small choir for the purpose, until 1890). Increasingly, the Sub-Dean served as de facto chaplain at St James's; by mid-18th century he was required to 'supply the absence of the dean, and to be as frequently at the chapel as he can'. In the 1840s his job was merged with that of Chaplain to the Household at St James's (previously styled 'Confessor of the Household'), whose duties were 'to read Prayers every Morning to the Family, to visit the Sick, to examine and prepare Communicants, to inform such as desire Advice in any Case of Conscience, or Point of Religion, etc.'.

=== Late modern ===
In 1860 a Chapel Royal Commission reduced the number of Gentlemen from sixteen to eight and the number of Priests-in-Ordinary from ten to eight (later the number of Priests would be further cut from eight to four.) The number of Chaplains-in-Ordinary was also reduced, gradually, from forty-eight to thirty-six (albeit a number of 'Honorary Chaplains' were appointed to maintain the traditional total of forty-eight). The Chaplains-in-Ordinary, unlike the Honorary Chaplains, received an annual allowance (in lieu of board, which had been provided in earlier times). The Sub-Dean now preached on the first Sunday each month and the Chaplains-in-Waiting on the other Sundays.

Up until 1912, the Chaplains had generally been reckoned to be part of the Chapel Royal establishment (albeit they were appointed by the Lord Chamberlain rather than the Dean of the Chapel Royal). That year, they were reconstituted as a 'College of Chaplains' with the Clerk of the Closet as their designated head. At the same time, their numbers were again reduced: the Chaplains-in-Ordinary to twelve, and the Honorary Chaplains to twenty-four; however in 1919 the distinction between the former and the latter was abolished, and as from that time all thirty-six were gazetted simply as 'Chaplain to the King'. Shortly afterwards, the term 'Ecclesiastical Household' first began to be used as a formal designation to refer to the College of Chaplains and the Chapel Royal together.

== Scotland ==
The King's Household in Scotland (Ecclesiastical) consists of chaplains who are all ministers of the Church of Scotland. There are ten "Chaplains in Ordinary" (upon retirement, a chaplain may be appointed an "Extra Chaplain"). Two Domestic Chaplains are also attached to the Household: the minister at Crathie Kirk (by Balmoral Castle) and the minister at the Canongate Kirk (by the Palace of Holyroodhouse in Edinburgh).

The Dean of the Chapel Royal in Scotland oversees ecclesiastical arrangements in the Household. The Dean is usually appointed from among the chaplains. The current Dean (since 2019) is Professor David Fergusson, who was also appointed Dean of the Thistle at the same time.

=== History ===
As in England (and elsewhere), bishops and clergy held offices in the Scottish royal court from the earliest days of the monarchy of Scotland. The Scottish Chapel Royal, specifically, was established (or re-established) by James IV at Stirling Castle in 1501; it consisted of sixteen canons, nine prebendaries and six boys. The Scottish Reformation severely curtailed the musical life of the chapel, and in 1571 the organ in the chapel in Stirling Castle was dismantled.

After the Union of the Crowns, James VI and I sought to Anglicanise the Kirk, beginning with the Scottish Chapel Royal. His efforts were rebuffed, but taken up anew by his son, Charles I (whose Scottish coronation, in 1633, took place using the full Anglican rite, in the Abbey of Holyrood). The ensuing 'Bishops' Wars' were a component of the period of civil war which culminated in Charles's execution.

== List of Chaplains to the Sovereign in England ==
The College of Chaplains consists of those appointed chaplain to the monarch. Each is invited to preach once a year in the Chapel Royal, but they are no longer required to fulfil other regular duties. Chaplains appointed to be a bishop or dean are required then to resign their chaplaincy.

=== Queen Victoria ===
During the reign of Queen Victoria, there were 48 Chaplains-in-Ordinary. After 1860 their number was gradually reduced to 36 with additional Honorary Chaplains being appointed (to maintain the total number of 48). New Chaplains-in-Ordinary were appointed from among the Honorary Chaplains.

==== Chaplains in Ordinary ====
- Charles Wesley, D.D. 1847 - 14 September 1859
- Augustus Frederick Phipps 18 June 1847 – 27 January 1896
- John Harries Thomas 1854 – 1863
- John Barlow ? – 1867 (resigned)
- Daniel Heneage Finch-Hatton 1866 – ?
- Edward Meyrick Goulburn – 1866 (resigned, appointed Dean)
- William Henry Brookfield 1 January 1867 – ? (replacing Goulburn)
- William Thomas Bullock 13 September 1867 – ? (replacing Barlow)
- Francis Byng 1872 – 1889 (resigned)
- Francis Pigou, Rural Dean, Vicar of Doncaster 4 July 1874 – ?)
- James Moorhouse, Rural Dean, Vicar of Paddington 4 July 1874 – 1876 (resigned, appointed a bishop)
- Edward Benson, Chancellor of Lincoln Cathedral 11 October 1875 – 1877 (resigned, appointed a bishop)
- George Granville Bradley, 14 September 1876 – ?
- William Henry Bliss, 8 November 1876 – ?
- Henry John Ellison, Honorary Canon of Christ Church, Oxford, Vicar of Windsor 26 December 1879 – 25 December 1899 (deceased)
- John Llewelyn Davies, Rector of Christ Church, Marylebone 10 February 1881 – ?
- Thomas Teignmouth Shore, Vicar of Berkeley Chapel, Mayfair 20 September 1881 – 22 January 1902
- Arthur Robins, Rector of Holy Trinity Church, Windsor 10 October 1882 – 1899 (deceased)
- John Blakeney, Archdeacon of Sheffield, Prebend of York 3 January 1890 – 12 January 1895 (replacing Byng), (deceased)
- Thomas Blundell Hollinshead Blundell, M.A., Rector of Halsall, Ormskirk 31 December 1895 – 1901
- W. Rogers – 1896 (deceased)
- James Welldon 1892 – 6 December 1898 (resigned, appointed a bishop)
- Clement Smith, Rector of Whippingham, Isle of Wight 2 March 1896 – 22 January 1901 (replacing Rogers)
- Alfred Ainger 2 March 1896 – 22 January 1901 (replacing Phipps)
- Arthur Lyttelton, 1896 – 6 December 1898 (appointed a bishop)
- John Henry Joshua Ellison, Vicar of Windsor 1896 – 22 January 1901
- Archibald Boyd-Carpenter, MA, Rector of St George's, Bloomsbury 13 December 1897 – (replacing John Neale Dalton)
- Charles Turner, Rector of St. Georges-in-the-East, London 21 April 1898 – 13 July 1898 (replacing Selwyn), (resigned, appointed a bishop)
- Walter Lawrance, Rector of St Albans, Hertfordshire 13 July 1898 – ?
- Herbert Edward Ryle, Hulsean Professor of Divinity at Cambridge 6 December 1898 – 4 January 1901 (resigned, appointed a bishop)
- William Donne, Vicar of Wakefield 6 December 1898 – ?
- Frederick Cecil Alderson 1 January 1900 – 22 January 1901 (replacing Robins)
- Robert Henry Hadden 1 January 1900 – 22 January 1902 (replacing Ellison)
- Robert Moberly 4 January 1901 – 22 January 1901

==== Honorary chaplains ====
- John Cawston, Chaplain of the Fleet, dates unknown
- William Henry Brookfield, Inspector of Schools 24 March 1862 – 1 January 1867
- William Drake, Honorary Canon of Worcester, Rural Dean and Vicar of Holy Trinity Church, Coventry 24 March 1862 – ?
- Lord Wriothesley Russell, Canon of Windsor, Rector of Chenies 28 March 1862 – ?
- Henry Liddell, Dean of Christ Church 28 March 1862 – January 1898 (deceased)
- Arthur Penrhyn Stanley, Regius Professor of Ecclesiastical History, Canon of Christ Church, Oxford 28 March 1862 – ?
- Joseph Lightfoot, Hulsean Professor of Divinity, Fellow and Tutor of Trinity College, Cambridge 28 March 1862 – ?
- John Edward Kempe, Prebend of St Paul's Cathedral and Rector of St. James Church, Westminster 26 June 1862 – ?
- George Protheroe 6 July 1865 – ?
- Thomas James Rowsell, Rector of St. Christopher-le-Stocks, and St. Margaret's, Lothbury 20 January 1866 – 1869
- Stopford Augustus Brooke 1 January 1867 – 1875
- Francis Byng 1867–1872
- Francis Pigou, ? – 4 July 1874
- James Moorhouse, ? – 4 July 1874
- Edward Benson, ? – 11 October 1875
- George Bradley, Master of University College, Oxford 4 July 1874 – ?
- William Henry Bliss, Minor Canon of Windsor, and Rector of West Isley, Berkshire 4 July 1874 – 8 November 1876
- Henry John Ellison, Honorary Canon of Christ Church, Oxford, Vicar of St John the Baptist Church, Windsor 11 October 1875 – 26 December 1879
- John Llewelyn Davies, Rector of Christ Church, St. Marylebone 8 November 1876 – 10 February 1881
- Thomas Teignmouth Shore, Vicar of Berkeley Chapel, Mayfair 2 July 1878 – 20 September 1881
- Arthur Robins, Rector of Holy Trinity Church, Windsor, and Chaplain to Her Majesty's Household Troops 7 September 1878 – 10 October 1882
- Edward Glyn, Vicar of Kensington 10 February 1881 – ?
- Arthur Lewis Babington Peile, Vicar of Holy Trinity Church, Ventnor 10 February 1881 – ?
- Randall Davidson, Resident Chaplain to the Archbishop of Canterbury 10 October 1882
- Richard Gee, Vicar of St John the Baptist Church, Windsor 1884–1901
- John Blakeney, Archdeacon of Sheffield, Prebend of York 1886 – 3 January 1890
- James Welldon 1888–1892
- Archibald Boyd-Carpenter ? – 13 December 1897
- John Fenwick Kitto, Vicar of St Martin-in-the-Fields 3 January 1890 – 1901
- John Erskine Clarke, Vicar of Battersea 27 July 1895 – 22 January 1901
- Alfred Ainger, Master of the Temple 28 January 1895 – 2 March 1896
- John Henry Joshua Ellison, Vicar of St Gabriel's, Pimlico and Vicar of St John the Baptist Church, Windsor 28 January 1895 – ?
- Arthur Lyttelton, Vicar of Eccles 27 July 1895 – 1896
- Clement Smith, Rector of Whippingham, Isle of Wight ? – 2 March 1896
- Charles Turner ? – 21 April 1898
- Walter Lawrance, Rector of St Albans, Hertfordshire ? – 13 July 1898
- Herbert Edward Ryle, Hulsean Professor of Divinity at Cambridge 2 March 1896 – 6 December 1898
- William Donne, Vicar of Wakefield 2 March 1896 – 6 December 1898
- Charles Gore, Canon of Westminster 21 April 1898 – ?
- Edward Perowne, Master of Corpus Christi College, Cambridge 21 April 1898 – ?
- Robert Moberly, Canon of Christ Church, Oxford and Regius Professor of Pastoral Theology 13 July 1898 – 4 January 1901
- Frederick Cecil Alderson, Canon of Peterborough and Rector of Lutterworth 13 December 1897 – 1 January 1900
- Robert Henry Hadden, Vicar of St Botolph, Aldgate 13 December 1897 – 1 January 1900
- John Stafford Northcote, Vicar of St Andrew's, Westminster, 6 December 1898 – ?
- Handley Moule, Principal of Ridley Hall, Cambridge 6 December 1898 – 22 January 1901
- Henry Pereira, Honorary Canon of Canterbury Cathedral 26 January 1900 – 22 January 1901
- Owen Evans, Warden of Llandovery College 26 January 1900 – 22 January 1901
- Edgar Gibson, Vicar of Leeds 4 January 1901 – 22 January 1901

=== King Edward VII ===
Upon his accession in 1901, Edward VII reduced the number of Chaplains-in-Ordinary to 12 and removed the prerequisite that a chaplain need previously have been appointed an honorary chaplain.

=== King George V ===
In 1918 the distinction between Chaplains-in-Ordinary and Honorary Chaplain was removed, and all were thenceforward referred to as Chaplains to the King.

=== Queen Elizabeth II ===
- John Stott, 1959–1991, and, on his retirement in 1991, an Extra Chaplain
- Noël Jones 1983–1984
- Ray Jones 1984–1989
- T. J. Thomas-Botwood, MBE 1 July 2022 – ?

=== King Charles III ===
- S. Ashley-Emery 9 September 2024 – present

== List of Chaplains in the Household in Scotland ==
=== Chaplains-in-Ordinary to the sovereign in Scotland ===
==== King George II ====
- William Gusthart from 1727 to 1764

==== Queen Victoria ====
- Robert Lee, DD 17 December 1846 – 1868
- Norman Macleod ? – 1862 (deceased)
- John Stuart, minister of St Andrew's church, Edinburgh 8 December 1862 – ? (replacing Macleod)
- Archibald Watson, 2 May 1868 – 1881 in place of Robert Lee, deceased
- Cameron Lees, 18 October 1881 - 1901 in place of Archibald Watson, deceased
- Robert Herbert Story, 1886 – 1901

==== King Edward VII ====
- Archibald Charteris, 18 October 1901 – 1908
- Donald Macleod, 18 October 1901 – 1910
- Cameron Lees, 18 October 1901 – 1910
- James MacGregor, 18 October 1901 – 1910
- Robert Herbert Story, 18 October 1901 – 1907
- J. R. Mitford Mitchell, 18 October 1901 – 1910
- Samuel James Ramsay Sibbald, Minister of the Parish of Crathie 30 June 1903 – 1910 (in place of Charteris, deceased)

==== King George V ====
- Donald Macleod, 7 May 1910 – 1916
- Cameron Lees, 7 May 1910 – 1913
- James MacGregor, 7 May 1910 – 1910
- J. R. Mitford Mitchell, 7 May 1910 – 1925
- Wallace Williamson, 7 May 1910 – 1926
- Samuel James Ramsay Sibbald, 7 May 1910 – 1936
- Pearson McAdam Muir, Moderator of the General Assembly of the Church of Scotland 16 December 1910 – 1924 (in place of MacGregor, deceased)
- Robert Howie Fisher, minister of Morningside, Edinburgh 25 July 1913 – ? (in place of Lees)
- Alexander Miller Maclean, 27 October 1914 – 1925 (in place of J.R. Mitford Mitchell, deceased)
- William Paterson Paterson, 10 March 1916 – 1936 (in place of Macleod)
- John White, 8 August 1924 – (in place of Muir, deceased)
- Archibald Main, Regius Professor of Ecclesiastical History, University of Glasgow 29 May 1925 – 1936 (in place of Alexander Miller Maclean, deceased)
- Norman MacLean, Collegiate Minister of St. Cuthbert's, Edinburgh 24 August 1926 – 1936 (in place of Wallace Williamson, deceased)
- Alexander Martin, Principal of New College, Edinburgh. 8 November 1929 – 1936
- Robert J. Drummond, 8 November 1929 – 1936
- Donald Fraser, 8 November 1929 – 1933
- George Adam Smith, 3 October 1933 – 1936 (in place of Donald Fraser)
- Charles Warr, Dean of the Chapel Royal and Dean of the Thistle, 8 November 1934 – 1936 (in place of Robert Howie Fisher; extra Chaplain in 1934)
- John White

==== King Edward VIII ====
- Samuel James Ramsay Sibbald, 21 July 1936 – 1937
- William Paterson Paterson, 21 July 1936 – 1937
- John White, 21 July 1936 – 1937
- Archibald Main, 21 July 1936 – 1937
- Norman MacLean, 21 July 1936 – 1937
- Alexander Martin, 21 July 1936 – 1937
- Robert J. Drummond, 21 July 1936 – 1937
- George Adam Smith, 21 July 1936 – 1937
- Charles Warr, 21 July 1936 – 1937

==== King George VI ====
- Samuel James Ramsay Sibbald, 2 March 1937 – 1950
- William Paterson Paterson, 2 March 1937 – ?
- John White, 2 March 1937 – ?
- Archibald Main, 2 March 1937 – 1947
- Norman MacLean, 2 March 1937 – ?
- Alexander Martin, 2 March 1937 – 1946
- Robert J. Drummond, 2 March 1937 – 1951
- Sir George Adam Smith, 2 March 1937 – 1942
- Charles Laing Warr, 2 March 1937 – 1952
- James Macdougall Black, 5 May 1942 – 1948 (in place of Sir George Adam Smith, deceased)
- James Hutchinson Cockburn, 24 November 1944 – 1952 (in place of John Stirton, deceased)
- Andrew Nevile Davidson, 30 July 1946 – 1952 (in place of Alexander Martin, deceased)
- John Baillie, 3 June 1947 – 1952 (in place of Archibald Main, deceased)
- William White Anderson, 15 November 1949 – 1952 (in place of James Black, deceased)
- John Henry Duncan, 31 October 1950 – 1951 (in place of Samuel Sibbald, deceased)
- Thomas Bentley Stewart Thomson, 16 March 1951 – 1952 (in place of John Henry Duncan, deceased)
- James Pitt Watson, 17 August 1951 – 1952 (in place of Robert J. Drummond, deceased)

==== Queen Elizabeth II ====
- Charles Laing Warr 1 August 1952 – 9 December 1969
- James Hutchison Cockburn 1 August 1952 – 1973
- Andrew Nevile Davidson 1 August 1952 – 1969
- John Baillie 1 August 1952 – 1960
- William White Anderson 1 August 1952 –
- Thomas Bentley Stewart Thomson 1 August 1952 – 1959 (thereafter Extra chaplain)
- Professor James Pitt Watson 1 August 1952 – 1963
- Professor James Stuart Stewart 1 August 1952 – 1966 (thereafter Extra chaplain)
- John Annand Fraser 1 August 1952 – 23 June 1964 (thereafter Extra Chaplain)
- John Lamb 1 August 1952 – (Domestic Chaplain Balmoral)
- Hugh Osborne Douglas, 17 December 1959 – 18 September 1981 (in place of Thomas Thomson, resigned) thereafter Extra chaplain
- Ronald William Vernon Selby Wright, 24 May 1963 – ? (in place of James Pitt Watson, deceased)
- Henry Charles Whitley, 24 May 1963 – 1976 thereafter Extra Chaplain
- Anderson Nicol 23 June 1964 – 1972 (in place of John Annand Fraser)
- William Henry Rogan 1966–1978 (in place of James Stuart Stewart) thereafter Extra Chaplain
- Robert Leonard Small 12 September 1967 – 1975 (in place of Edgar Primrose Dickie, retired) thereafter Extra Chaplain
- W R Sanderson
- William Morris 15 April 1969 – ? (in place of Nevile Davidson, retired)
- George Thomson Henderson Reid 1969–1980 (in place of Charles Laing Warr, deceased)
- James Boyd Prentice Bulloch 1980–1981 (in place of Reid, retired)
- William Bryce Johnston 1981–1991 (in place of Bulloch, deceased)
- Colin Forrester-Paton 18 September 1981 – 5 April 1988 (in place of Hugh Osborne Douglas, retired) thereafter Extra chaplain
- Harry William Macphail Cant 1972–1991 (in place of Anderson Nicol, deceased)
- Kenneth Macvicar 1974–1991
- John McIntyre 1975-1986 (in place of Robert Leonard Small, retired)
- Robin Barbour 1976–1991 (in place of Henry Whitley, retired)
- Allan Young 1978–1979 (in place of Rogan, retired)
- Gilleasbuig Macmillan 1979–2014 (in place of Young, deceased)
- William Boyd Robertson Macmillan 5 April 1988 – (in place of Colin Forrester-Paton, retired)
- James Leslie Weatherhead 11 April 1991 – 2017 (in place of Harry William MacPhail Cant, deceased)
- Mary Irene Levison 11 May 1991 – 29 January 1993 (in place of RAS Barbour, retired) (thereafter Extra Chaplain)
- Andrew Stewart Todd 1991 – ? (in place of MacVicar, retired)
- Charles Robertson 1991–2010 (in place of Johnston, retired)
- Iain Torrance 2001–2019
- James Alexander Simpson 21 July 1992 – 2004 (in place of Alwyn James Cecil Macfarlane, retired)
- Norman Walker Drummond 29 Jan 1993 – 2022 (in place of Levison, retired)
- John Paterson ? – 2008
- James Gibson 2004 – 2018 (afterwards extra Chaplain)
- Angus Morrison 2006 – ?
- Kenneth MacKenzie 2007 – ? (Domestic chaplain)
- Lorna Hood 2008 – ? (in place of Paterson, retired)
- Neil Gardner 2008 – ? (Domestic chaplain)
- Alistair Bennett 2010–2022
- Susan Brown 2012 – ?
- John Chalmers 2013 – ?
- Finlay Macdonald 2001–2015
- David Fergusson 2015 – ?
- Alastair Symington 1996–2017
- George Cowie 2017–2021
- James Gibson – 2018
- Liz Henderson 2018 – present (in place of Gibson)
- George Whyte 2019 – present
- Dr Marjory Maclean 2022 – present (in place of Cowie, deceased)
- Dr Grant Barclay 2022 – present (in place of Drummond)
- Prof John Swinton 2022 – present (in place of Bennett)

=== Extra Chaplains-in-Ordinary to HM in Scotland ===
==== King Edward VII ====
- Malcolm C. Taylor, 18 October 1901 – ?

==== King George V ====
- Malcolm C. Taylor, 7 May 1910 – ?
- Charles Laing Warr 12 March 1926

==== Queen Elizabeth II ====
- George Thomson Henderson Reid 1980 – ?
- Kenneth Macvicar 1991 – ?
- William Bryce Johnston 1991 – ?
- Gilleasbuig Macmillan 2014 – ?
- Iain Torrance 2019 – ?
- John Chalmers 2022 – ?

==== King Charles III ====
- Dr. Elizabeth Lorna Hood 2023 – present
- Dr. Angus Morrison 2023 – present
