= Iain Torrance =

Scottish theologian and academic (born 1949)

The Very Reverend Sir Iain Torrance KCVO OStJ TD FRSE
- Moderator of the General Assembly
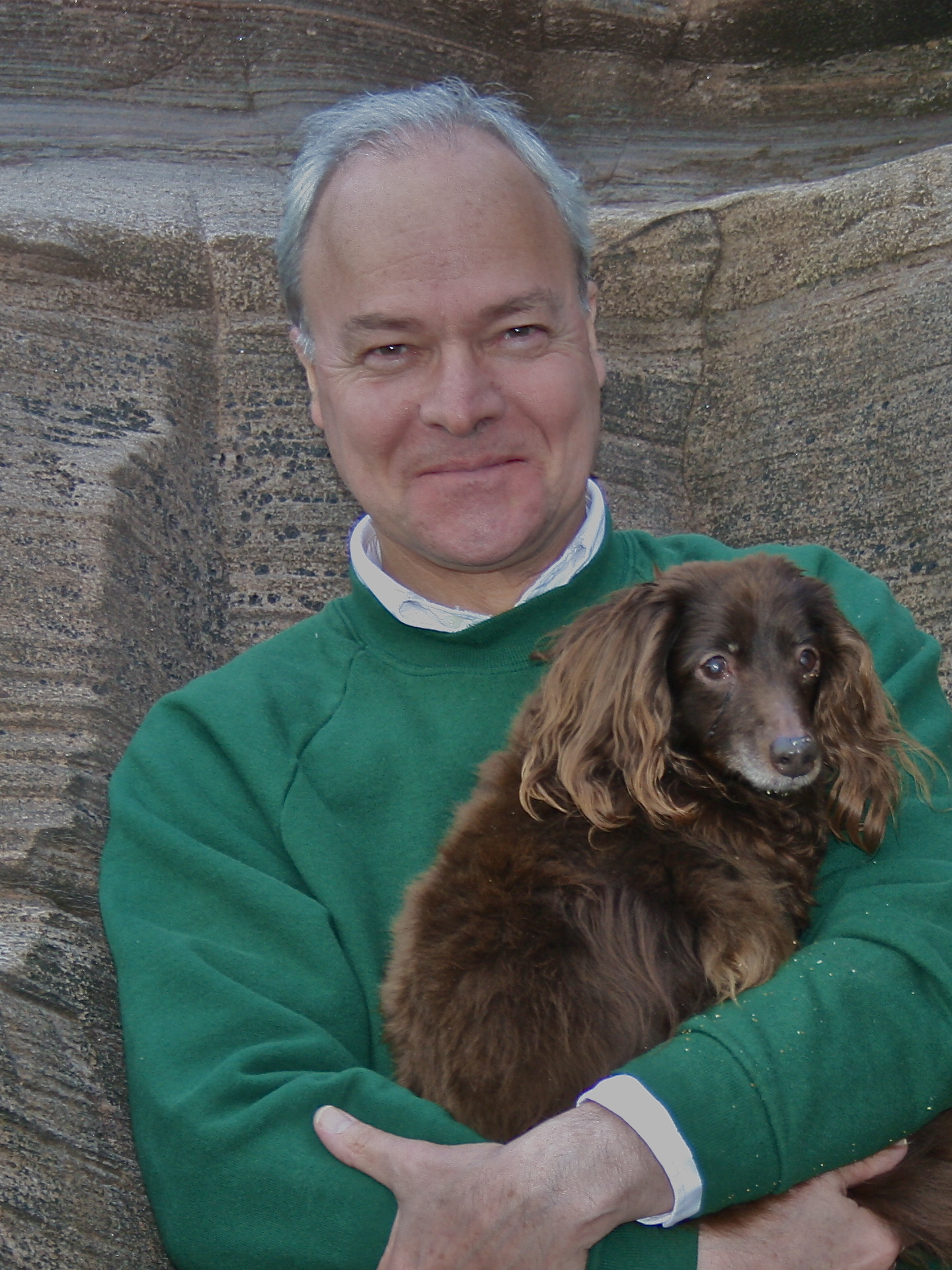
- Torrance in 2011
- Church: Church of Scotland
- In office: 2003 to 2004
- Predecessor: Finlay Macdonald
- Successor: Alison Elliot
- Other posts: Dean of the Chapel Royal in Scotland (2013–19); Dean of the Thistle (2014–19)

Orders
- Ordination: 23 January 1982

Personal details
- Born: Iain Richard Torrance; 13 January 1949 (age 77) Aberdeen, Scotland
- Denomination: Church of Scotland
- Spouse: Morag Ann Torrance (m. 1975)
- Children: 2
- Occupation: Retired academic

Academic background
- Education: Edinburgh Academy; Monkton Combe School
- Alma mater: University of Edinburgh; University of St Andrews; Oriel College, Oxford
- Thesis: A translation of the letters between Severus of Antioch and Sergius the Grammarian, with a theological introduction
- Doctoral advisor: Sebastian Brock

Academic work
- Discipline: Theology
- Sub-discipline: Patristics; systematic theology; Christian ethics; Syriac studies
- Institutions: Queen's College, Edgbaston; University of Birmingham; University of Aberdeen; Christ's College, Aberdeen; Princeton Theological Seminary

Sir Iain Richard Torrance, KCVO, OStJ, TD, FRSE (born 13 January 1949) is a retired Church of Scotland minister, theologian and academic. He is Pro-Chancellor of the University of Aberdeen, Honorary Professor of Early Christian Doctrine and Ethics at the University of Edinburgh, President and Professor of Patristics Emeritus at Princeton Theological Seminary, and an Extra Chaplain to Her Majesty Queen Elizabeth II in Scotland. He was formerly Moderator of the General Assembly of the Church of Scotland, Dean of the Chapel Royal in Scotland, and Dean of the Order of the Thistle. He is married to Morag Ann (née MacHugh), whom he met while they were students at the University of St Andrews, and they have two children.

== Biography ==
Torrance was born in Aberdeen, Scotland. He is the younger son of Thomas Forsyth Torrance, Moderator of the General Assembly of the Church of Scotland in 1976. He was educated at the Edinburgh Academy and at Monkton Combe School in Bath, then graduated MA (University of Edinburgh), BD (University of St Andrews), DPhil (Oriel College, Oxford). His doctoral thesis was entitled A translation of the letters between Severus of Antioch and Sergius the Grammarian, with a theological introduction, and was supervised by Sebastian Brock.

Following Oxford, Torrance was ordained on 23 January 1982 by the Church of Scotland's Presbytery of Shetland as minister at Northmavine Parish Church in the Shetland Islands. Northmavine is the most northerly parish on the main island of the Shetland archipelago, and is famous for the stunning cliff scenery of Eshaness.

On 26 July 1982, he was commissioned in the Royal Army Chaplains' Department, British Army, as a Chaplain to the Forces 4th Class (equivalent in rank to captain). He was promoted to Chaplain to the Forces 3rd Class (equivalent to major) on 26 July 1988. Between 1982 and 1997, he served as a Territorial Army chaplain with the 2nd Battalion, 51st Highland Volunteers and then the Royal Army Medical Corps. He was awarded the Efficiency Decoration (Territorial) in 1995, in recognition of twelve years long service in the reserves. From 1997 to 2000, he was a chaplain to the Army Cadet Force. He resigned his British Army commission on 16 February 2000.

After serving for four years in Northmavine, in 1985 Torrance moved to The Queen's College, Birmingham, an ecumenical theological college (mainly Anglican and Methodist) with strong links to the University of Birmingham. There, he taught New Testament studies.

In 1989 he moved to a lectureship in Patristics and New Testament at the University of Birmingham. He was invited to become a member of the International Dialogue between The World Alliance of Reformed Churches (WARC) and the Eastern Orthodox Church in 1992, becoming co-chair in 1995.

In 1993, he moved to the University of Aberdeen, subsequently being promoted to a personal chair and becoming Dean of the Faculty of Arts and Divinity in 2001.

In 2001 he was appointed a Chaplain-in-Ordinary to Her Majesty Queen Elizabeth II in Scotland.

He served as Moderator of the General Assembly of the Church of Scotland in 2004, continuing in that office until the appointment of Alison Elliot the following year.

In 2005 he represented the Church of Scotland and the WARC at the installation of Pope Benedict XVI. In 2008, he represented the WARC at the Lambeth Conference.

Torrance appears as himself in Alexander McCall Smith’s Edinburgh novels, The Comforts of a Muddy Saturday (2008) and The Forgotten Affairs of Youth (2011).

The composer Paul Mealor dedicated to Torrance the anthem which he had been commissioned to write for the UK and Commonwealth Commemoration of World War One in Glasgow Cathedral on 4 August 2014.

In July 2013 The Queen appointed Torrance Dean of the Chapel Royal in Scotland, and in July 2014 she appointed him Dean of the Order of the Thistle. He retired from these posts in July 2019.

In 2021 he was appointed by the Scottish Episcopal Church to lead an Independent Review into "difficulties" in the Diocese of Aberdeen and Orkney following a series of allegations regarding the Bishop, Anne Dyer. Professor Torrance's report, which Dyer tried to have changed after completion, found that there was a culture of bullying and "systematic dysfunction in the diocese", and that there were previous similar problems in Dyer's time at Durham. Professor Torrance stated that: "Without colluding in what I much fear is a repetition of the past, I cannot recommend the continuation of a tenure in which I fear that more people will be made to feel diminished and discouraged." He recommended that Dyer be immediately sent on sabbatical and that she should step down from her position permanently.

== Moderator of the General Assembly of the Church of Scotland ==
Iain Torrance's tenure as Moderator of the General Assembly of the Church of Scotland (2003-2004) was marked by a nationally reported controversy following his public comments on homosexuality in which he stated that he was "utterly untroubled" by the ordination of gay clergy. The context was the nomination of Canon Jeffrey John as Bishop of Reading. Doctor Torrance thereby became the first leader to encourage gay ordination in the Church of Scotland's 500-year history, a stance that marked a major shift in the Church's view and which was met with fierce opposition. Torrance subsequently used a Christmas sermon as a platform to challenge homophobia within his own church. The Reverend David W. Lacy, one of Torrance's successors as Moderator, publicly opposed this stance, arguing that the appointment of openly gay ministers would rip the Church of Scotland apart. When asked to comment on some public criticism by fellow ministers, Torrance said of his critics: "I am not convinced that their vision and my vision need collide in such a way that one must consume the other. There is room for both, and a lively Church needs both those who are zealous in upholding tradition and those who probe its boundaries."

His year in office also saw the first official call for the release of the Abdelbaset al-Megrahi, a Libyan national imprisoned for the bombing of Pan Am Flight 103, informally known as the Lockerbie bombing. Furthermore, Nelson Mandela had also called for the support of the Western Christian Churches in what the South African lawyer considered a clear miscarriage of justice. Torrance made representation to the British Prime Minister Tony Blair on behalf of Megrahi pointing out the deep unease in Scotland and elsewhere over the safety of the verdict.

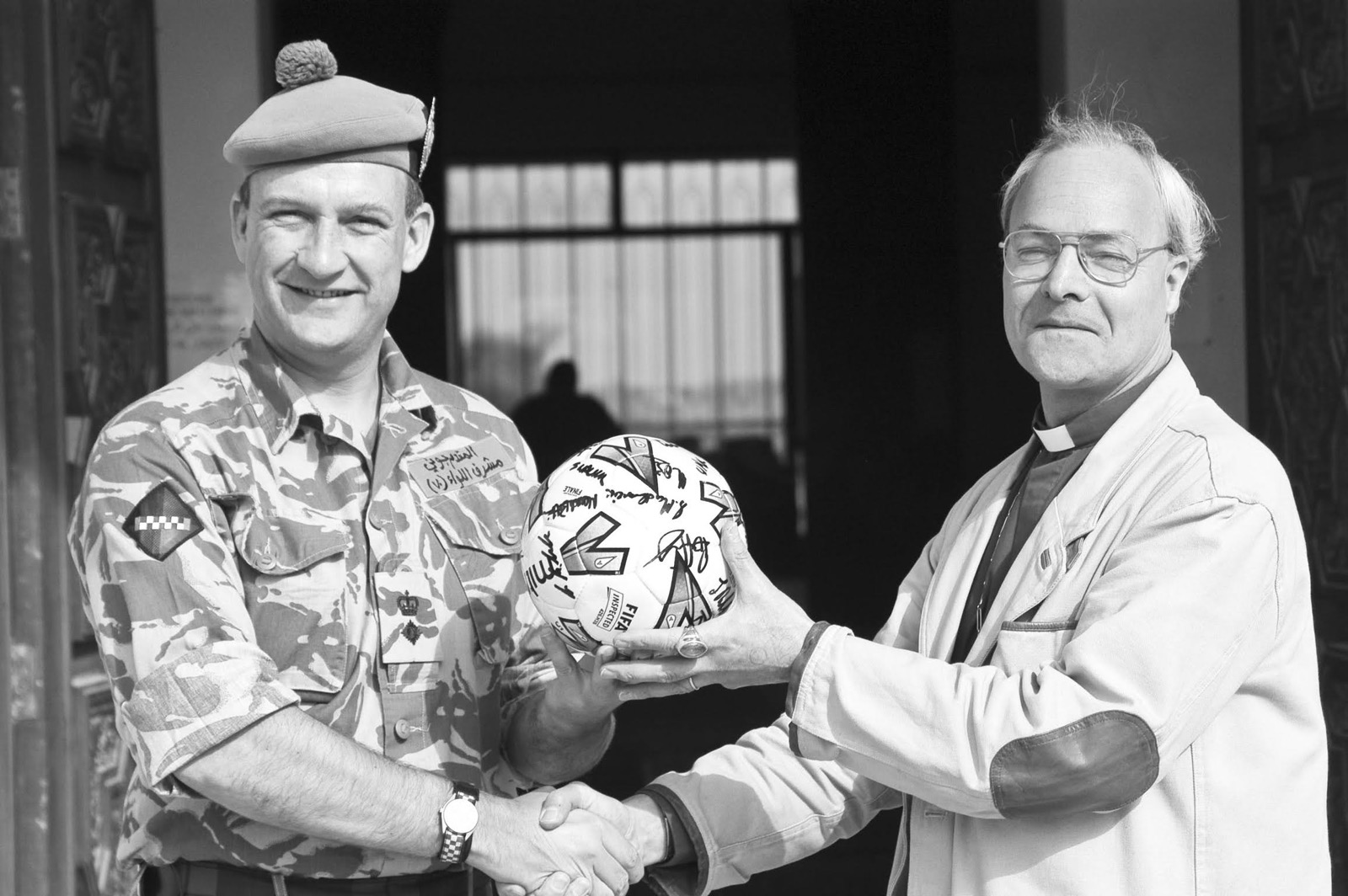
In Iraq with the CO of the Argylls, Col Jonny Gray

During his year in office, Torrance travelled widely on behalf of the Church, being the first Moderator to visit the churches in China. At some personal risk, in February 2004, he visited every British unit in Southern Iraq. He visited the demilitarized zone in Eritrea as the guest of the United Nations peacekeeping force and preached in southern Sudan.

His formal title following the end of his Moderatorial year is the Very Reverend Professor Iain Torrance.

== President of Princeton Theological Seminary ==
Iain Torrance took up his appointment as the sixth president of Princeton Theological Seminary on 1 July 2004 and was installed as President and Professor of Patristics, on 11 March 2005, at a service in the Princeton University Chapel. The inauguration featured more than 64 delegates from institutions of higher education including the four ancient universities of Scotland (St. Andrews, Glasgow, Aberdeen and Edinburgh) as well as The Chapel Royal in Scotland, Yale University Divinity School, Duke University, and Howard University School of Divinity. Twelve ecclesiastical delegates, including Rick Ufford-Chase, the Moderator of the Presbyterian Church (USA), attended. The service also highlighted "Christ is the World’s Redeemer," a hymn written by John Ferguson and commissioned by Princeton Theological Seminary for the inauguration.

At Princeton Theological Seminary, Torrance was active in the review of existing programs, both academic and financial. He was committed to the renovation of the seminary library (opened in January 2013, a month after he retired) and the rebuilding of student housing on the Charlotte Rachel Wilson campus (completed in May 2012).

Torrance has been committed to inter-faith dialogue, being a public supporter of the Muslim document A Common Word Between Us and You (2007). In August 2010, he was elected to the C-1 Religious Leader Commission.

Torrance retired from the presidency of Princeton Theological Seminary on 31 December 2012.

== Academic career ==
- Co-editor of the Scottish Journal of Theology (1982–2015)
- Lecturer in New Testament, Queen's College, Birmingham (1985–1989)
- Lecturer in New Testament and patristics, University of Birmingham (1989–1993)
- Lecturer in Divinity, University of Aberdeen (1993–1997)
- Senior Lecturer in Divinity, University of Aberdeen (1997–1999)
- Professor of Patristics and Christian Ethics, University of Aberdeen (1999–2004)
- Dean of the Faculty of Arts and Divinity, University of Aberdeen (2001–2004)
- Master, Christ's College, Aberdeen (2001–2004)
- President, Princeton Theological Seminary (2004–2012)
- Honorary Professor of Early Christian Doctrine and Ethics, University of Edinburgh (since 2013)
- Pro-Chancellor, University of Aberdeen (since 2013)
- Convener of the Church of Scotland's Theological Forum (2013–2017)

== Awards and honours ==
- Awarded Efficiency Decoration (Territorial) (TD), 1995
- Chaplain-in-Ordinary to Her Majesty Queen Elizabeth II in Scotland, 2001 to 2019
- Professor emeritus, Aberdeen University, 2004
- Pride Scotia "Friend for Life" Award for "his efforts to promote equality and the inclusion of gay people in Scotland," 2004
- Honorary DD, University of St Andrews and Aberdeen University, 2005, University of Edinburgh, 2012
- Honorary DTheol, Debrecen Reformed Theological University, Debrecen, 2006
- Elected Corresponding Fellow (CorrFRSE), Royal Society of Edinburgh (RSE), 2007. By act of the Council of the RSE, converted to Fellow (FRSE) on return to the United Kingdom, 2013
- Honorary LHD, King College, Bristol, Tennessee, 2007
- Honorary Distinguished Alumnus, Princeton Theological Seminary, 2012
- James I. McCord Award from the Center of Theological Inquiry for "outstanding contributions to ecumenical scholarship," 2012
- Dean of the Chapel Royal in Scotland, July 2013 to July 2019
- Dean of the Order of the Thistle, August 2014 to July 2019
- Appointed Officer of the Order of St John, 2015
- Appointed Knight Bachelor (Kt) in the 2018 New Year Honours for services to Higher Education and Theology: knighted by Queen Elizabeth II during a ceremony at Holyrood Palace on 3 July 2018
- Appointed Knight Commander of the Royal Victorian Order (KCVO) in July 2019, upon relinquishing the office of Dean of the Chapel Royal in Scotland and Dean of the Thistle

Knight Commander of the Royal Victorian Order	2019
Knight Bachelor	2018
Officer of the Order of St John	2015
Efficiency Decoration (Territorial)	1995

=== His Arms ===
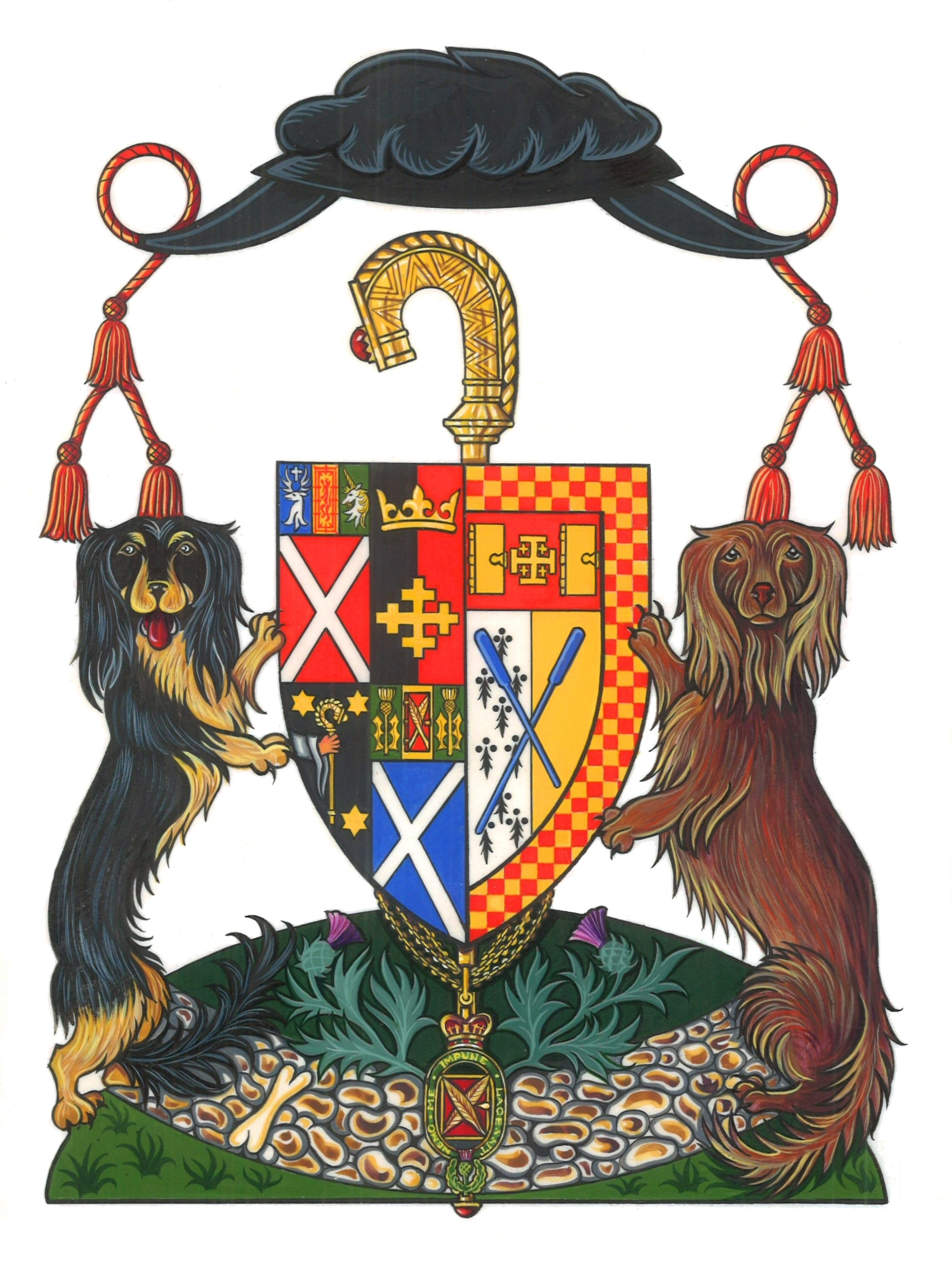
Coat of Arms of Iain R. Torrance

Professor Torrance's arms were matriculated as those of a second son in 1974. Here they are shown impaled with his arms of office as of Dean of the Order of the Thistle and Dean of the Chapel Royal in Scotland. The Celtic staff behind the shield denotes the Dean of the Chapel Royal's position, ex officio, as titular abbot of Dundrennan and of Crossraguel. The badge is that of the Dean of the Order of the Thistle, with the ecclesiastical hat, its distinctive red tassels showing his rank.

On 18 March 2016 Torrance was presented by the Lord Lyon, Dr. Joseph J. Morrow QC, with Letters Patent granting him supporters. Supporters are a high heraldic honour and are only automatically granted to peers and members of the most senior grades of the orders of knighthood, but the Lord Lyon has the discretion to award supporters to persons of distinction. The award recognises Professor Torrance's eminent service to academia, the Church of Scotland, and the Crown in Scotland. The two dachshunds are Maud and Cassiopea, who were often spotted in and around Princeton Theological Seminary when he was President there.

== The Torrance family in theology ==
Iain Torrance's father was the distinguished theologian Thomas F. Torrance, sometime Professor of Christian Dogmatics at New College, Edinburgh, who served as Moderator of the General Assembly of the Church of Scotland in 1976. His cousin Alan Torrance is Professor of Systematic Theology at St Andrews University. James B. Torrance, sometime Professor of Systematic Theology at University of Aberdeen, was his uncle.

== Selected publications ==
- Torrance, Iain (1998) [1988]. Christology after Chalcedon. Cambridge: Canterbury Press. ISBN 0907547974.
- Torrance, Iain (1992), "Paradigm Change in Sixth Century Christology", Greek Orthodox Review, 36 (part 3-4), Brookline: 277–285, ISSN 0017-3894
- Torrance, Iain; Storrar, William, eds. (1995). Human Genetics: A Christian Perspective. Edinburgh: St. Andrew Press. ISBN 0861532082.
- Torrance, Iain (1996), "The Trinity in Relation to Creation and Incarnation", Neue Zeitschrift für Systematische Theologie und Religionsphilosophie, 38, Tübingen: 29–37, doi:10.1515/nzst.1996.38.1.29, ISSN 0028-3517, S2CID 170244108
- Torrance, Iain (1998), "Theological Issues in the Debate between the Reformed and Orthodox Churches on the Doctrine of the Trinity", in Vischer, Lukas (ed.), Agreed Statements from the Orthodox Reformed Dialogue, Geneva: WARC, pp. 25–35, ISBN 9290750502
- Torrance, Iain; Spinks, Bryan, eds. (1999). In Praise of God: Essays on Modern Reformed Liturgy. Edinburgh and Grand Rapids: T & T Clark and Eerdmans. ISBN 0567086062.
- Torrance, Iain; Tanner, Kathryn; Webster, John, eds. (2007). Oxford Handbook of Systematic Theology. Oxford: Oxford University Press. ISBN 9780199245765.
- Torrance, Iain (2008), "Severus of Antioch on the Forty Martyrs", in Kiraz, George (ed.), Malphono w-Rabo d-Malphone: Studies in Honor of Sebastian P. Brock, Piscataway: Gorgias Press, pp. 717–734, ISBN 9781593337063
- Torrance, Iain; McFarland, Ian; Fergusson, David; Kilby, Karen, eds. (2011). Cambridge Dictionary of Christian Theology. Cambridge: Cambridge University Press. ISBN 9780521880923.
- Torrance, Iain (2011). The Correspondence of Severus and Sergius. Texts from Christian Late Antiquity. Vol. 11. Piscataway: Gorgias Press. ISBN 9781593339715.

Religious titles
Preceded by Finlay Macdonald	Moderator of the General Assembly of the Church of Scotland; 2003–2004	Succeeded by Alison Elliot
Preceded by John Cairns	Dean of the Chapel Royal in Scotland; 2013-2019	Succeeded by David Fergusson
Preceded by Gilleasbuig Macmillan	Dean of the Thistle; 2014-2019	Succeeded by David Fergusson
Academic offices
Preceded by Thomas W. Gillespie	President of Princeton Theological Seminary; 2004–2012	Succeeded by M. Craig Barnes
