= Andrew Doig =

Andrew Doig may refer to:

- Andrew W. Doig (1799–1875), U.S. Representative from New York
- Andrew Beveridge Doig (1914–1997), Church of Scotland minister and African missionary
