= William Gusthart =

Scottish minister (1680–1764)

William Gusthart (c.1680–1764) was a Church of Scotland minister who served as Dean of the Chapel Royal and Chaplain in Ordinary to the King.

== Life ==
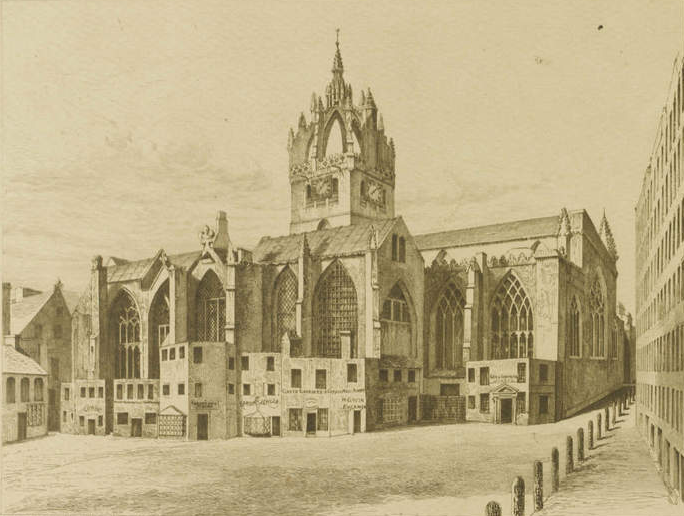
St Giles' from the south c. 1700

He studied at Edinburgh University graduating MA in 1698. He was appointed minister of Crailing in the Scottish Borders in 1708. In 1712 he refused the Oath of Abjuration. He was one of the representatives chosen from Scotland to congratulate George I on his ascension to the crown in 1714. In 1717 he successfully negotiated an amendment to the Oath of Abjuration.

In January 1721 he was appointed "second charge" of Tolbooth Parish, one of the four parishes contained within St Giles Cathedral. In 1726 he was appointed Dean of the Chapel Royal and Chaplain in Ordinary to George I but continued to serve the next King, George II in Scotland on his ascension in 1727.

From 1757 (when he was aged around 77) he asked Rev Alexander Carlyle, a friend of Rev Alexander Webster his colleague of "first charge" to preach on his behalf but the congregation objected on grounds that Carlyle was a "theatre-goer".

He died on 27 March 1764.

== Family ==
In 1711 he married Ann Tait daughter of John Tait of Howden

In 1718 he married Ann Hepburn daughter of Robert Hepburn of Whitburgh, by whom he had four children.
