= Gilleasbuig Macmillan =

The Very Reverend Gilleasbuig Macmillan
- Born: Gilleasbuig Iain Macmillan; 21 December 1942
- Died: 13 December 2023 (aged 80)
- Education: University of Edinburgh
- Occupation: Minister
- Spouse: Maureen
- Children: 1, Mary Jane
- Denomination: Church of Scotland
- Theological work
- Language: English
- Tradition or movement: Reformed (Presbyterianism)

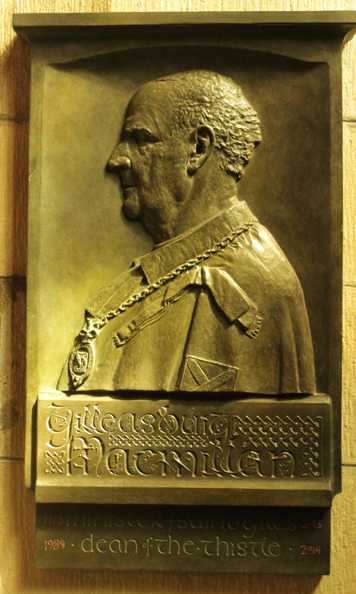
Plaque to Gilleasbuig Macmillan, St Giles Cathedral

Gilleasbuig Iain Macmillan KCVO FRSE (21 December 1942 – 13 December 2023) was a minister of the Church of Scotland. From 1973 until his retirement in September 2013 he served as Minister of the High Kirk of Edinburgh, Scotland, which is sometimes described as the mother church of Presbyterianism. He was Dean of the Thistle and a Chaplain to Queen Elizabeth. As Dean of the Thistle he was styled "The Very Reverend".

== Life ==
He was born in Stirling on 21 December 1942. He graduated from the University of Edinburgh (M.A. and B.D.). Macmillan grew up in the Highlands, in Appin, where his father, Kenneth Macmillan was minister - originally at Bunessan on the Isle of Mull and then at Appin. His father being a minister was a formative influence upon him.

He came to Edinburgh University, to New College, to train for the ministry. He was a university student from 1960 to 1967. His probation placement was with Rev. David Steel in Linlithgow. From there, he was minister at Portree Parish Church on the Isle of Skye, from 9 May 1969 to 1973. Subsequently, he moved to minister at St Giles Cathedral in 1973.

He presided at the Kirking of the Parliament in 1999, 2003, 2007 and 2011.

Macmillan was widely tipped for the selection as Moderator of the General Assembly in 1996 and again in 2002, but failed to win sufficient support. According to The Scotsman (30 October 2002), "Although he has a high public profile in the capital, and inside the Kirk, insiders felt he was not universally popular."

In October 1991, St Giles held a Service of Repentance in memory of the victims of the First Gulf War, which was also attended by Muslims. Instead of simply allowing the Muslims to leave the service to carry out their prayers, Reverend Macmillan decided to stop the service twenty minutes after its start and let the Muslims perform their prayers in the Cathedral next to the Holy Table. The Adhan, the Muslim call to the prayer, was made from the pulpit of the cathedral and the prayers were performed in the midst of a Christian congregation of over 1,000. For this he was awarded a Muslim News Award for Excellence.

He was appointed Honorary Chaplain (Pontifex Maximus) of the Harveian Society of Edinburgh and held this position until 2013.

Macmillan retired as minister of St Giles' Cathedral on 30 September 2013. His position as Dean of the Thistle was filled by Rev Iain Torrance.

Macmillan died on 13 December 2023. He left behind his wife, Maureen, and his daughter, Mary Jane.

== Bibliography ==
- A Workable Belief: Thoughts on the Apostles' Creed (St Andrew Press, 1993)
- Understanding Christianity (Dunedin Academic Press, 2004)

== Honours ==
- Elected Fellow, Royal Society of Edinburgh, 2005.
- Honorary Doctorate (DD), University of St Andrews, 2003.
- Appointed CVO by the Queen, 1999.
- Appointed KVCO by the Queen, 2014
- Honorary Doctorate (Dr.h.c.), University of Edinburgh, 1998.
- Annemarie Schimmel Award for Championing a Muslim Cause, 2009.

Religious titles
Preceded by John McIntyre	Dean of the Thistle; 1989–2014	Succeeded by Iain Torrance
