= Richard Prentys =

15th-century dean

Richard Prentys (fl. 1390s – c. 1410s) was a Canon of Windsor from 1403 to 1404 and Dean of the Chapel Royal.

== Career ==
He was appointed:

- Prebendary of Seaford in Chichester 1398
- Prebendary of the seventh stall in St Stephen's, Westminster 1395 - 1401
- Prebendary of the third stall in St Stephen's, Westminster 1401 - 1404
- Master of St Katharine's by the Tower 1402 - 1412
- Prebendary of Stratford in Salisbury 1404
- Prebendary of Grantham Australis in Salisbury 1406
- Archdeacon of West Ham 1400 - 1406
- Dean of the Chapel Royal 1403 - 1414

He was appointed to the sixth stall in St George's Chapel, Windsor Castle in 1403 and held the canonry until 1404.
