= The Very Reverend =

Honorific style

The Very Reverend (abbreviated as The Very Revd or The Very Rev) is an honorific style given to certain (primarily Western) Christian clergy and ministers.

The definite article "the" should always precede "Reverend" when used before a name (e.g., the Very Rev. John Smith), because "Reverend" is an honorific adjective, not a title.

== Catholic ==
In the Catholic Church, the style is given, by custom, to priests who hold positions of particular note. These include: vicars general, episcopal vicars, judicial vicars, ecclesiastical judges, vicars forane (deans or archpriests), provincials of religious orders, rectors or presidents of cathedrals, seminaries or colleges/universities, priors of monasteries, or canons. Monsignors of the grade of Chaplain of His Holiness are styled as the Very Reverend Monsignor, while honorary prelates and protonotary apostolics are styled the Right Reverend Monsignor. Now, apart from legitimate custom or acquired right, newer monsignors are simply styled The Reverend Monsignor. The style is also accorded in the Dominican Order to holders of the title of Master of Sacred Theology.

== Eastern Orthodox ==
In English-speaking Eastern Orthodox churches, the style is used both for archimandrites, among the monastic clergy, and for protopresbyters and archpriests, for married clergy.

== Oriental Orthodox ==
In the Syriac Orthodox Church and Malankara Orthodox Syrian Church, the title is given to those at the rank of Cor-Episcope (Chorbishop). This is the highest rank a married man can achieve. The title is also given to Rambans (monk-priest) in both traditions.

== Anglican ==
In the Anglican Communion, the style is used with certain senior priests in a diocese. The senior priest of a cathedral, whether a dean or a provost, is usually styled as the Very Reverend regardless of whether the priest is also the rector of the cathedral parish, or whether the cathedral is a parish church. In the Episcopal Church USA, the dean of a seminary or divinity school is also styled in this form, as is the priest who is either appointed by the local bishop or elected by fellow priests as the leader of a deanery, which is a geographic subdivision of a diocese. In some Episcopal dioceses convocation is used in lieu of deanery. The Provosts and Deans of Dioceses in the Scottish Episcopal Church (who do not head a cathedral chapter) and the Anglican Church of Canada (who do) are also styled as the Very Reverend.

== Presbyterian ==
In some mainline Protestant churches with a Presbyterian heritage, the style is used for former Moderators of the General Assembly, such as:

- a former Moderator of the United Church of Canada who is an ordained minister (as laypeople can also be elected to the position of moderator)
- a former Moderator of the Presbyterian Church in Ireland
- a former Moderator of the General Assembly of the Church of Scotland
- a former Moderator of the General Assembly of the Presbyterian Church of Aotearoa New Zealand

By custom, the Dean of the Chapel Royal, the Dean of the Thistle and (if a Church of Scotland minister) the principal of St Mary's College, St Andrews, are also styled The Very Reverend.

== See also ==
- The Most Reverend
