= Elizabeth Dempster =

Scottish sculptor 1909-1987

Elizabeth Dempster ARSA
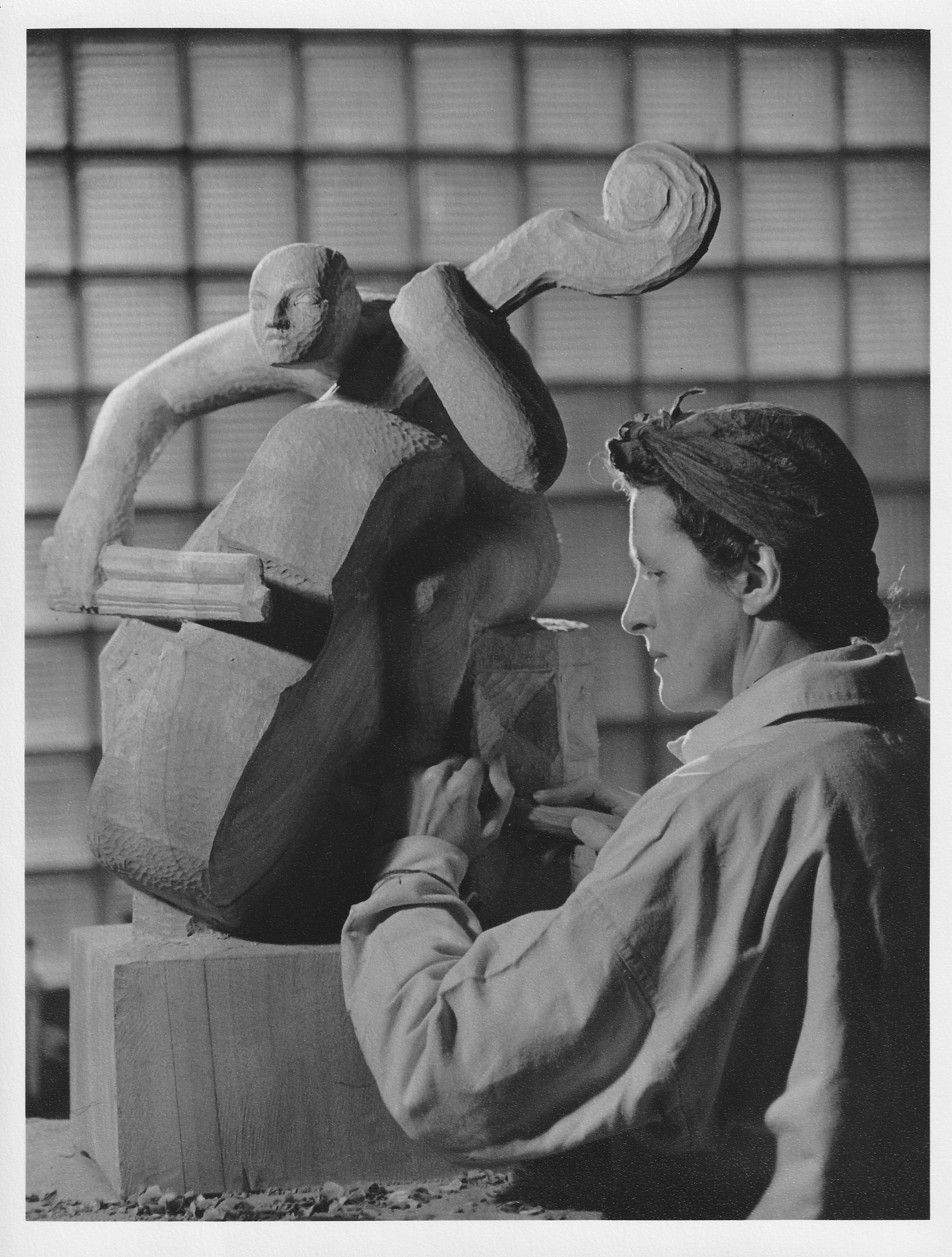
- The artist at work
- Born: 23 April 1909; Greenock, Scotland
- Died: 17 January 1987 (aged 77); Edinburgh, Scotland
- Education: Edinburgh College of Art (1930), Regent Street Polytechnic, Munich Academy
- Occupation: Sculptor

Elizabeth Strachan Dempster, ARSA, (23 April 1909 – 17 January 1987) was a Scottish sculptor.

== Biography ==
Dempster was born on 23 April 1909 in Greenock, Scotland to Elizabeth Watt and Duncan Dempster, a sugar refiner. Around 1928, after her parents' deaths, she moved to Edinburgh to be with her guardian, Dr Charles Warr, minister at St Giles' Cathedral, Edinburgh and Honorary Chaplain to the King George VI and later the Queen Elizabeth II.

Dempster studied sculpture at Edinburgh College of Art (1930). Her tutors included the sculptors Alexander Carrick and Norman John Forrest, and she studied alongside the sculptors Hew Lorimer, Thomas W. Whalen and Scott Sutherland. Dempster also trained further in London at Regent Street Polytechnic and at Munich Academy in Germany.

In the late 1930s, Dempster was commissioned to produce three large carvings in oak, two of angels and one of the biblical figure Jubal, for the new organ case at St Giles' Cathedral. Her work on the pieces was in danger of being delayed because she had been called up for service as a Red Cross nurse at the outbreak of World War II, however, given the public importance of the work, the Red Cross released her from her duties so that she might complete it.

Her first commission was Seahorse for the Clyde Navigation Trust which was shown at the 1938 Empire Exhibition at Bellahouston Park.

Dempster designed and carved the first and fifth monoliths of the Royal Scots Monument in Princes Street Gardens in Edinburgh. The monument was unveiled on 26 July 1952.

In the early 1950s, Dempster was commissioned to design and carve the roundels that sit above seven figures carved by Hew Lorimer, on the facade of the National Library of Scotland building.

Dempster was responsible for two wood carvings at St Swithun's Church in East Grinstead, one of which is of St Swithun.

Dempster was elected as an Associate of the Royal Scottish Academy in 1960. She regularly exhibited her work at the academy's annual Exhibition of Painting, Sculpture and Architecture. The first piece she exhibited was St Bridget in 1935. In 1946, her piece Mors Janua vitae won an award from the RSA for which she received a prize of £50.

Dempster died on 17 January 1987 in Edinburgh.

== Works ==
A selection of Dempster's works, several of which are held in the collections of the Royal Scottish Academy and National Galleries of Scotland.

- St Bridget (1935)
- Alfred Ernest Warr 1899-1937 (1937)
- Thought (1937)
- A member of a committee (1938)
- Seahorse (1938)
- The denial (1939)
- Mother and child (1946)
- Cock (1946)
- Mors Janua vitae (1946)
- Housewives (1947)
- Black queen (1947)
- Four ducks on a pond (1948)
- There were shepherds abiding in a field (1948)
- Bear (1949)
- St Cuthbert and the otters (1950)
- Jacob and the angel (1950)
- Maggie (1951)

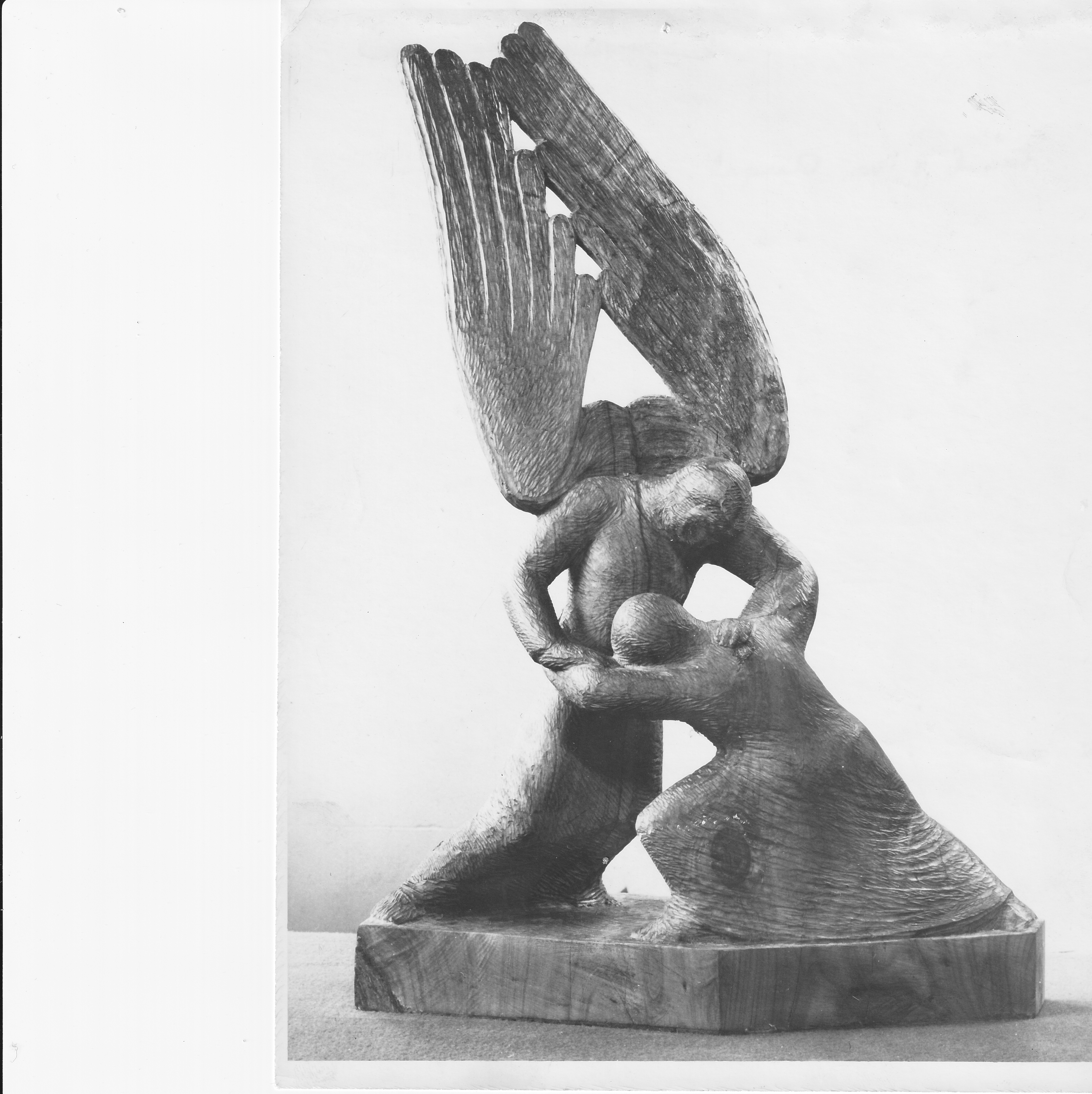
Jacob and the Angel

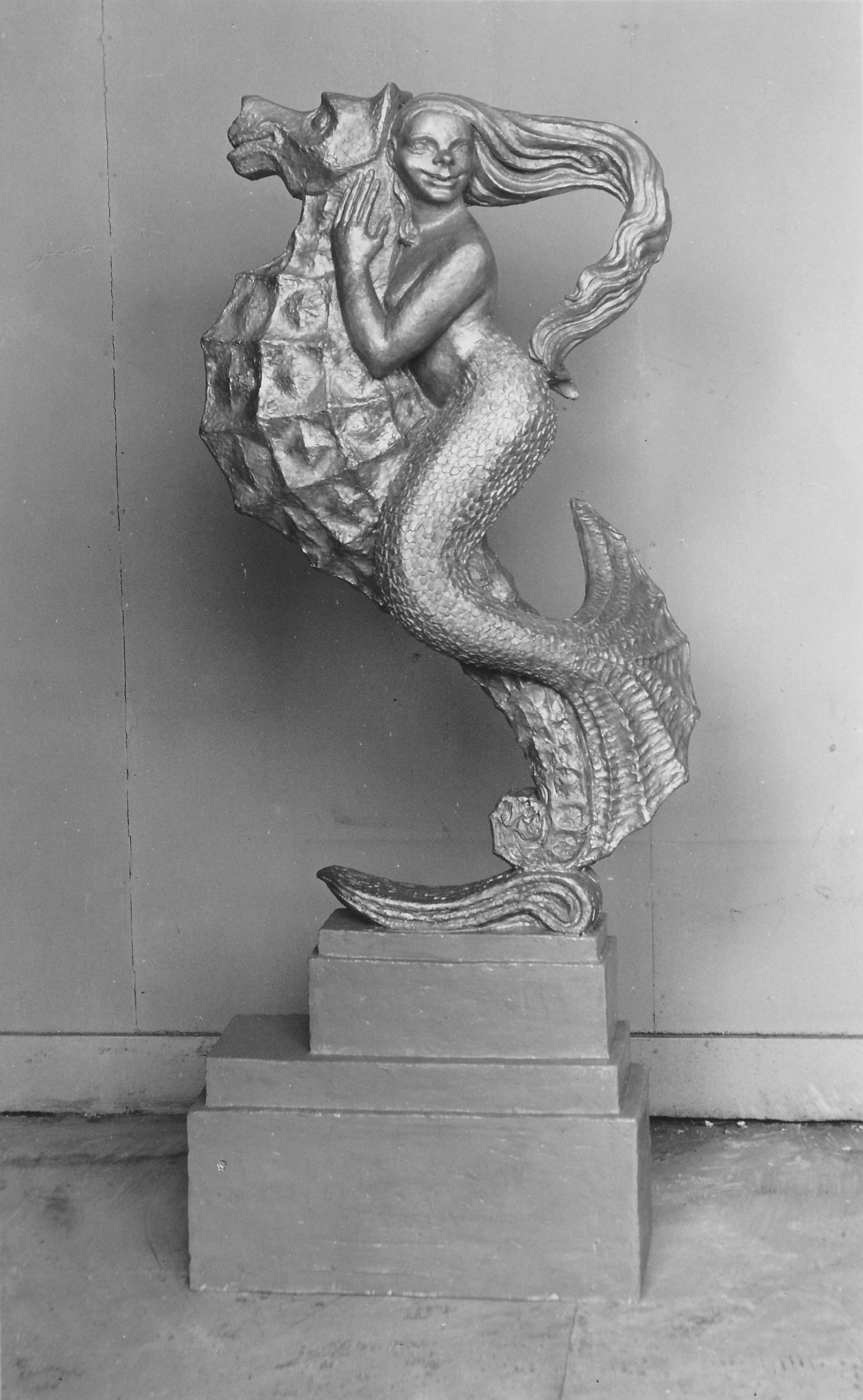
Seahorse
