= Thomas de Lynton =

Canon of Windsor (fl. 1380s)

Thomas de Lynton (fl. 1380s) was a Canon of Windsor from 1378 to 1387 and Dean of the Chapel Royal.

== Career ==
He was appointed:

- Prebendary of Newington in St Paul's Cathedral 1381
- Treasurer of Wells Cathedral 1383
- Prebendary of Colworth in Chichester Cathedral 1385 - 1388

He was appointed to the fourth stall in St George's Chapel, Windsor Castle in 1378, and held the stall until 1387.
