= John McIntyre (theologian) =

Scottish minister and theologian

John McIntyre CVO FRSE (20 May 1916 – 15 December 2005) was a Scottish minister and theologian. He was Moderator of the General Assembly of the Church of Scotland 1982/83 and Chaplain to the Queen in Scotland from 1990 to 1996.

== Biography ==
McIntyre was born in Glasgow on 20 May 1916 into a working-class family; he was the son of a carpenter. He was educated at Bathgate Academy and the University of Edinburgh (MA in Mental Philosophy First-class honours 1938, BD with Distinction).

He was ordained as a minister in the Church of Scotland in 1941 and worked in Glen Orchy and Inishail as locum tenens (1941–43) and in Fenwick as minister (1943–45).

In 1946 he was appointed Hunter Baillie Professor of Theology at St. Andrew's College, Sydney, Australia. He remained at the college until 1956, having been appointed Principal in 1950. He was elected Honorary Fellow in 1990. He gained a PhD in theology from the University of Edinburgh in 1953. In 1956 he was appointed Professor of Divinity in the University of Edinburgh, having declined the offer of a position at Union Theological Seminary in the City of New York. He held the chair until 1986. He was in addition Principal of New College and Dean of the Faculty of Divinity (1968–74) and acting Principal and Vice-Chancellor of the university (1973–74 and again in 1979). He was first senior warden of Pollock Halls of Residence, where the refectory is now named in his honour.

In 1971 he was interim minister of the High Kirk of Edinburgh. He was Dean of the Most Ancient and Most Noble Order of the Thistle from 1974 until 1989, Extra Chaplain to the Queen in Scotland 1974–75, Chaplain 1975–86, and Extra Chaplain again 1986–2005. He was appointed Commander of the Royal Victorian Order by HM The Queen in 1985.

In 1977 he was appointed Honorary Chaplain (Pontifex Maximus) of the Harveian Society of Edinburgh.

In 1982 he succeeded Very Rev Andrew Beveridge Doig as the Moderator of the General Assembly of the Church of Scotland. From 1983 until 1987 he was convenor of the Church of Scotland Board of Education.

In 1986 he was honoured with a Festschrift, Religious imagination, ed. James P. Mackey (Edinburgh University Press, 1986). Having taken the substantive degree of Doctor of Letters at Edinburgh, he was awarded honorary doctorates by the University of Edinburgh (Doctor honoris causa), University of Glasgow (Doctor of Divinity), and the College of Wooster (Doctor of Humane Letters). He was elected Fellow of the Royal Society of Edinburgh in 1977. He was a member of council 1979–86 and vice-president 1983–86.

He retired in 1996 and died at The Royal Infirmary of Edinburgh on 15 December 2005.

== Publications ==
- The shape of Christology: studies in the doctrine of the person of Christ (2nd edn, Edinburgh: T&T Clark, 1998; 1st edn, London: SCM, 1966)
- The shape of pneumatology: studies in the doctrine of the Holy Spirit (Edinburgh: T&T Clark, 1997)
- The shape of soteriology: studies in the doctrine of the death of Christ (T&T Clark, 1992)
- Faith theology, and imagination (Edinburgh: Handsel Press, 1987)
- Prophet of penitence: our contemporary ancestor (Edinburgh: Saint Andrew Press, 1972)
- The availability of Christ (Edinburgh: Scottish Church Society, 1962)
- On the love of God (London: Collins, 1962)
- The Christian doctrine of history (Edinburgh: Oliver and Boyd, 1957; Grand Rapids: Eerdmans, 1957)
- St. Anselm and his critics: a re-interpretation of the Cur Deus homo (Edinburgh: Oliver and Boyd, 1954)

The Shape of Soteriology was recently studied in Eamonn Mulcahy, The Cause of Our Salvation: Soteriological Causality according to some Modern British Theologians, 1988–98 (Tesi Gregoriana Serie Teologia 140, Rome: Editrice Pontificia Università Gregoriana, 2007), alongside Colin Gunton, The Actuality of Atonement: a Study of Metaphor, Rationality and the Christian Tradition (Edinburgh: T&T Clark, 1988), Vernon White, Atonement and Incarnation: an essay in Universalism and Particularity (Cambridge University Press, 1991), and Paul Fiddes, Past Event and Present Salvation: the Christian Idea of Atonement (London: Darton, Longman, & Todd, 1989).

Religious titles
Preceded by Henry Charles Whitley	Dean of the Thistle; 1974 –1989	Succeeded by Gilleasbuig Macmillan
