= Charles Warr =

20th-century Church of Scotland minister and author

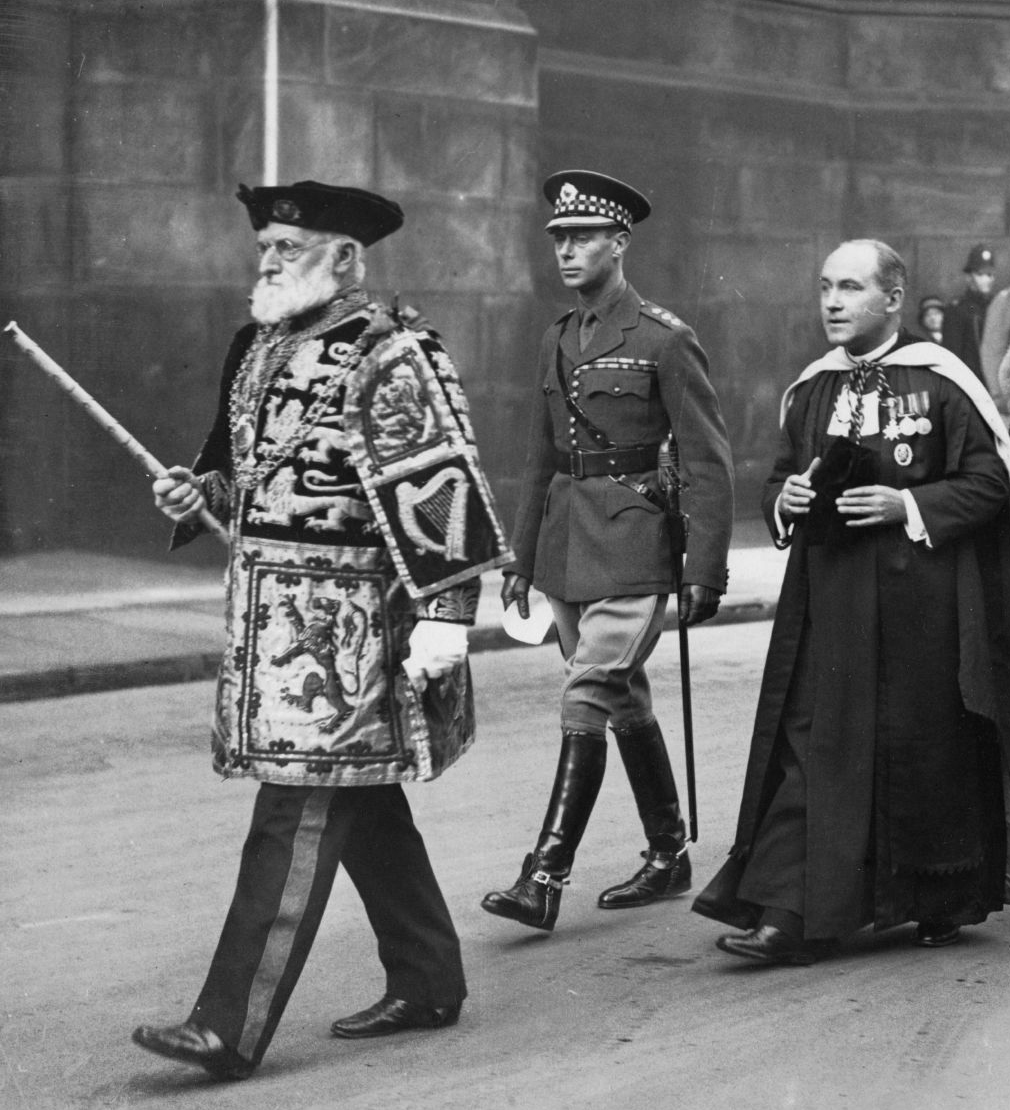
Rev. Charles Warr (right) with the Duke of York (centre) and Sir Francis Grant, Lord Lyon King of Arms (left) and proceeding to St Giles' Cathedral in 1933

Charles Laing Warr KCVO FRSE (1892–1969) was a Church of Scotland minister and author in the 20th century.

== Life ==
Warr was born on 20 May 1892, the second son of the Reverend Alfred Warr, sometime minister of Rosneath in Dunbartonshire, and his wife, Christian Grey Laing. He was christened on 24 July 1892.

He was educated at Glasgow Academy and then studied Divinity at the University of Edinburgh. He was commissioned into the 9th Argyll and Sutherland Highlanders in 1914 and served during World War I. When peace returned he was an assistant minister at Glasgow Cathedral. Later he was the minister of St Paul's Greenock and then St Giles' Cathedral. He was Dean of the Thistle and the Dean of the Chapel Royal in Scotland from 1926 to 1969. He was appointed an Extra Chaplain to His Majesty in 1926 and Chaplain-in Ordinary in 1934. He was a sub-prelate of the Order of St John of Jerusalem and an Honorary Chaplain to the King (and later an Honorary Chaplain to the Queen).

In 1932 he was appointed Honorary Chaplain (Pontifex Maximus) of the Harveian Society of Edinburgh.

In 1936 he was elected a Fellow of the Royal Society of Edinburgh. His proposers were Sir D'Arcy Wentworth Thompson, Arthur Crichton Mitchell, Edward Theodore Salvesen (Lord Salvesen), and Sir Thomas Henry Holland.

He died on 14 June 1969 and was cremated at Warriston Crematorium, where a memorial panel exists, but also has a panel on the family memorial in Rosneath Graveyard.

== Publications ==
- The Unseen Host: Stories of the Great War (1916) and sixteen later editions up to 2012
- Echoes of Flanders (1917) and eleven editions up to 2012
- Alfred Warr of Rosneath (1917) a biography of his father
- The Black Chanter (1921)
- John Knox: A Criticism
- Principal Caird (1926)
- The Call of the Island (1929)
- Scottish Sermons and Addresses (1930)
- The Presbyterian Tradition (1933)
- Bruce (1936)
- The Glimmering Landscape (1960)

== Family ==
In 1918 he married Christian Lawson Aitken Tatlock (d.1961).

They had no children but were guardians of the Scottish sculptor Elizabeth Dempster.

Religious titles
Preceded by Andrew Wallace Williamson	Dean of the Chapel Royal in Scotland; 1926–1969	Succeeded by James Boyd Longmuir
Preceded by Andrew Wallace Williamson	Dean of the Thistle; 1926–1969	Succeeded by Henry Charles Whitley
