= Cameron Lees =

Church of Scotland minister and author

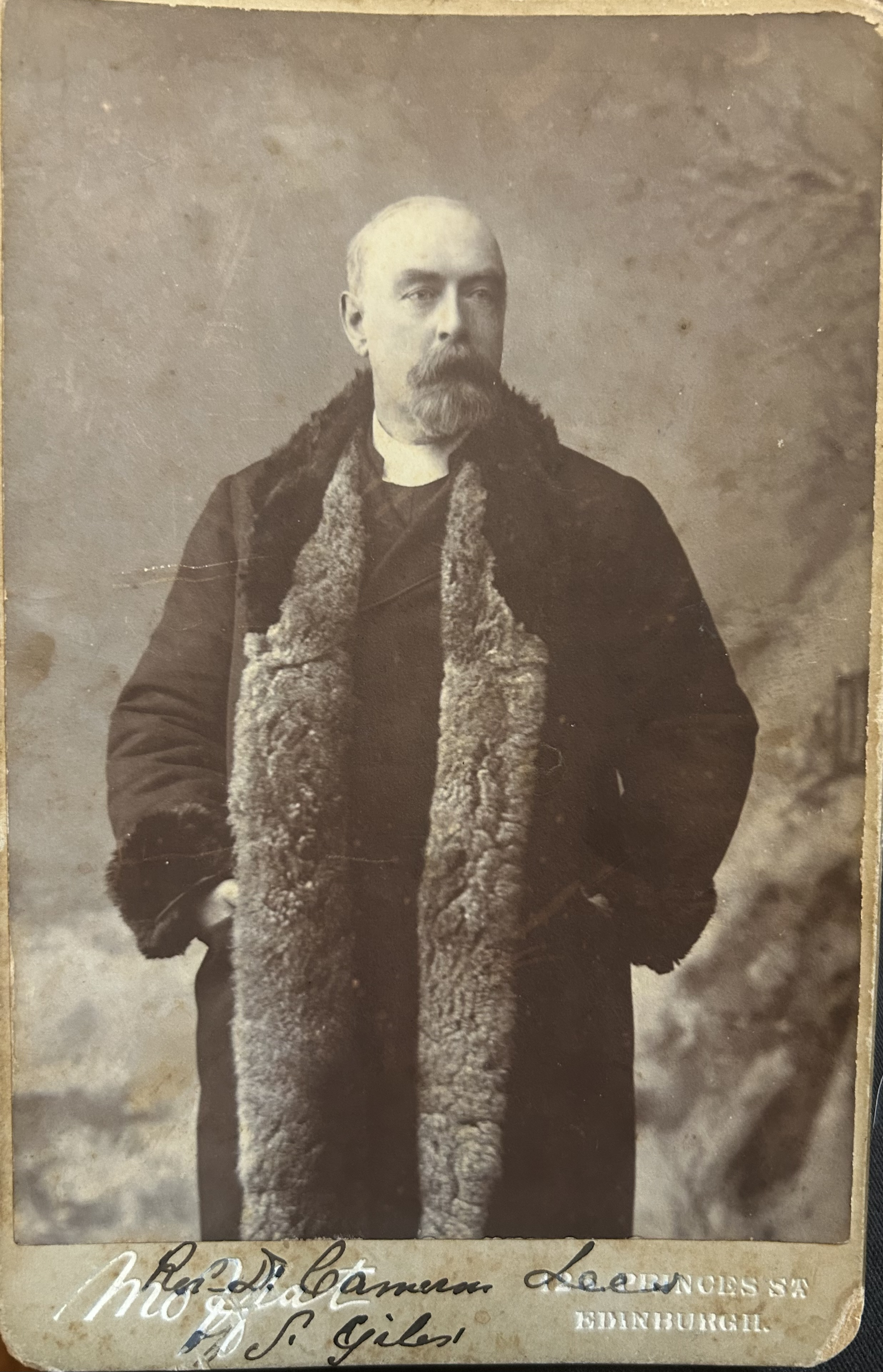
Cabinet Card of James Cameron Lees - Sermon at St. Giles

James Cameron Lees KCVO (1835–1913) was a Church of Scotland minister and author at the end of the 19th century and the beginning of the 20th.

== Life ==
Lees was born in London on 24 July 1834 the son of James Lees, a Perth gun-maker who had relocated to London, and his wife Mary Isabella Cameron. His father was then manager of the Royal Caledonian Asylum there, but later relocated to Stornoway as a minister.

He was educated in London them studied divinity at first Glasgow University then Aberdeen University. Joining his family in Stornoway he was licensed to preach by the Presbytery of the Isle of Lewis as a minister in the Church of Scotland in November 1855.

In November 1856 he was ordained as minister of Carnach in Rossshire. In 1859 he was translated to "second charge" of Paisley Abbey and was promoted to "first charge" in 1865 and in 1877 he replaced David Arnot as minister of St Giles' Cathedral in Edinburgh, one of Scotland's most important charges. He was Dean of the Thistle and Dean of the Chapel Royal from 1887 to 1910. He was an Honorary Chaplain to the Queen from 1881 to 1901, and was appointed a Chaplain-in-Ordinary in Scotland to King Edward VII in October 1901. In 1901 he was living at 33 Blacket Place in south Edinburgh. He reached this position of importance through the patronage of Lord Abercorn.

He received three honorary Doctor of Divinity degrees: Glasgow University (1871); Aberdeen University (1894); and Edinburgh University (1906). He also received an honorary Doctor of Laws (LLD) from St Andrews University in 1889.

Lees was appointed a Commander of the Royal Victorian Order (CVO) in 1906 and a Knight Commander of the Order (KVCO) in the 1909 Birthday Honours.

He resigned from St Giles in May 1909. In 1910 he became Chaplain in Scotland to King George V.

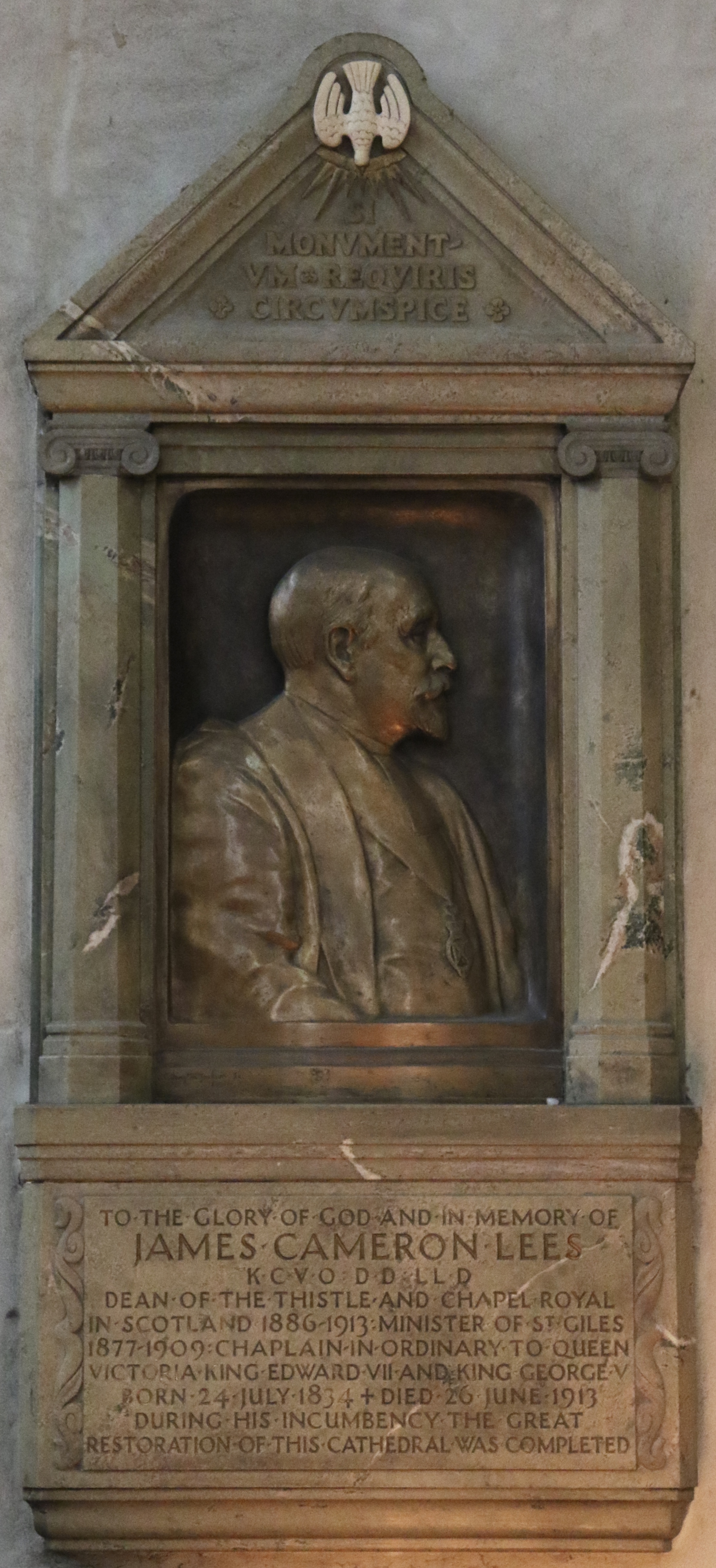
Memorial in St. Giles' Cathedral

He died at St Giles in Kingussie on 26 June 1913, and is buried in the Dean Cemetery, Edinburgh on the northern side of the original cemetery.

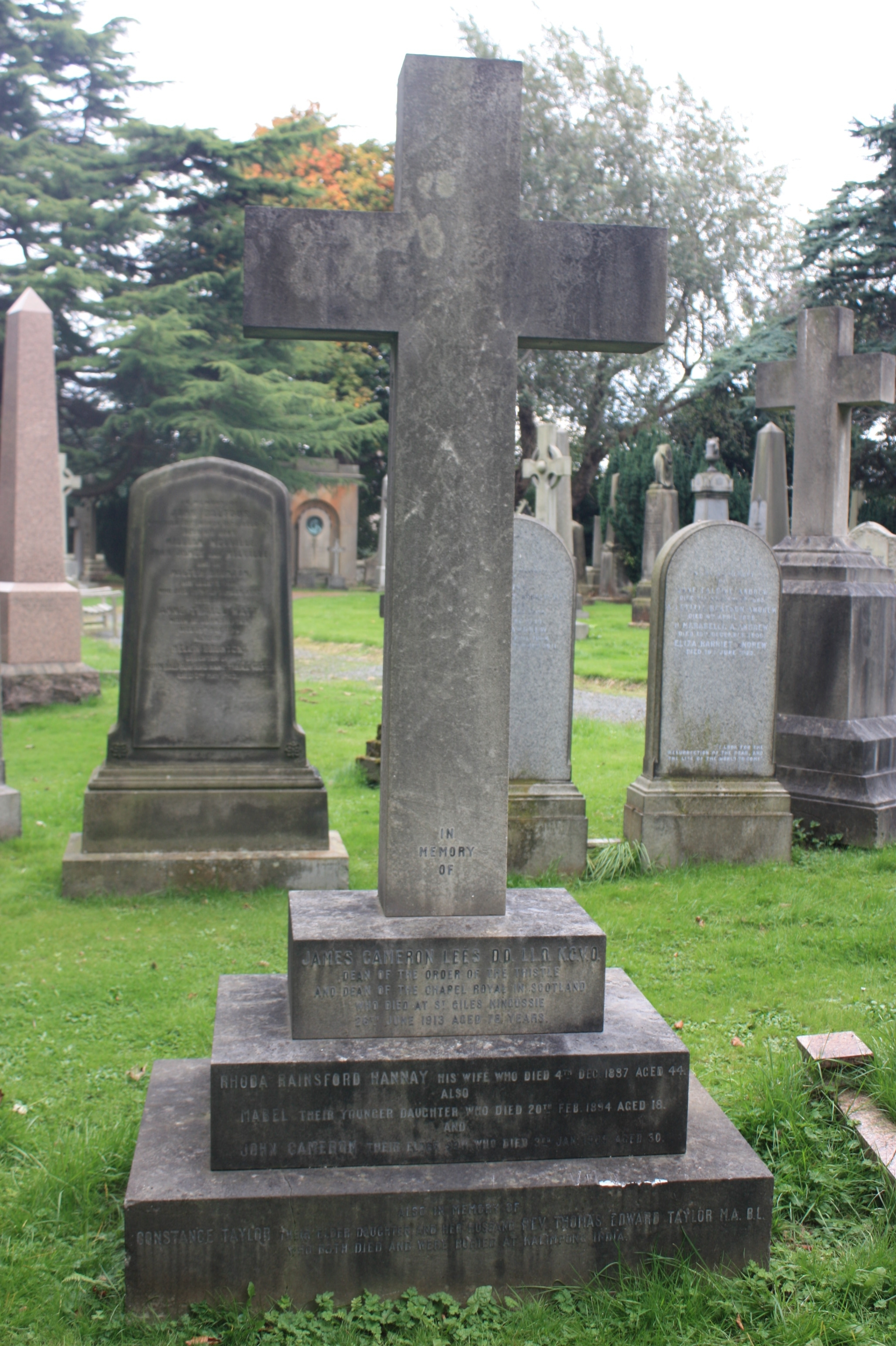

== Family ==
In 1872, Lees was married to Rhoda Rainsford Hannay (1843–1887), daughter of Major Rainsford Hannay of Creetown. Their children included:

- Constance (1873–1902) married Rev Thomas Edward Taylor a missionary in Darjeeling
- Mary Isabel Cameron Lees (1876–1893)
- John Cameron Lees (1880–1909)
- Arthur Stanley Lees (b.1882)

== Publications ==
- The Abbey of Paisley from its Foundation to its Dissolution (1878)
- Tobersnorey (1878) anon.
- Stronbuy (1881 reprinted 1893) anon.
- St Giles, Edinburgh: Church, College, and Cathedral (1889)
- The Greek Church (1894)
- Life and Conduct (1911 reprinted 1922)
- Beatha Agus Caithearnh-Beatha (1916)
- A History of the County of Inverness (1897)
- Visitation of the Sick

Religious titles
Preceded by First appointment in the modern era	Dean of the Chapel Royal in Scotland; 1887–1910	Succeeded by Andrew Wallace Williamson
Preceded by John Tulloch	Dean of the Thistle; 1887–1910	Succeeded by Andrew Wallace Williamson
