= Henry Ellison (priest) =

English cricketer

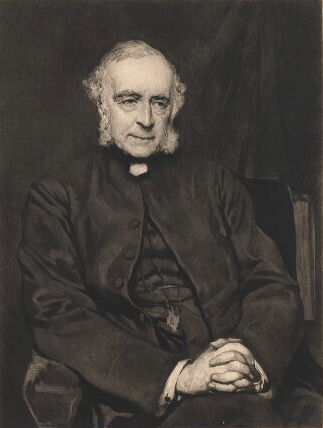

Personal information
- Full name: Henry John Ellison
- Born: 7 June 1813; Westminster, Middlesex, England
- Died: 25 June 1899 (aged 86); Canterbury, Kent, England
- Batting: Unknown

Domestic team information
- Years: Team
- 1833–1837: Cambridge University
- 1835: Marylebone Cricket Club

Career statistics
| Competition | First-class |
|---|---|
| Matches | 6 |
| Runs scored | 64 |
| Batting average | 6.40 |
| 100s/50s | –/– |
| Top score | 22 |
| Catches/stumpings | 3/– |
- Source: Cricinfo, 22 April 2021

Henry John Ellison (7 June 1813 – 25 December 1899) was an English first-class cricketer and clergyman.

== Life ==
The son of the cricketer George Ellison, he was born at Westminster in June 1813. He was educated at Westminster School, before going up to Trinity College, Cambridge.

After graduating from Cambridge, he took holy orders in the Anglican Church in 1838. His first ecclesiastical post was as a priest at Norwich in the same year of his ordination. After two decades holding positions at various curacies, Ellison founded the Church of England and Ireland Temperance Society in 1862. He wrote a number of books on the temperance movement. Ellison was an honorary canon at Christ Church Cathedral, Oxford from 1873 to 1894, in addition to being appointed an honorary chaplain to Queen Victoria in October 1875; four years later he was appointed a Chaplain-in-Ordinary to Victoria, a post he held until his death in December 1899 at Canterbury, where he was also an honorary canon at Canterbury Cathedral. He was buried at Windsor.

== Cricketer ==
While studying at Cambridge, Ellison played first-class cricket for Cambridge University from 1833 to 1837, making five appearances. He had limited success in his five matches, scoring 42 runs with a highest score of 18. Ellison also made one first-class appearance for the Marylebone Cricket Club against Cambridge University at Parker's Piece in 1835, making his highest first-class score of 22 in the match.

== Family ==
Ellison married in 1854 Mary Dorothy Jebb, daughter of Sir Joshua Jebb.
