= William White Anderson =

Scottish minister and chaplain

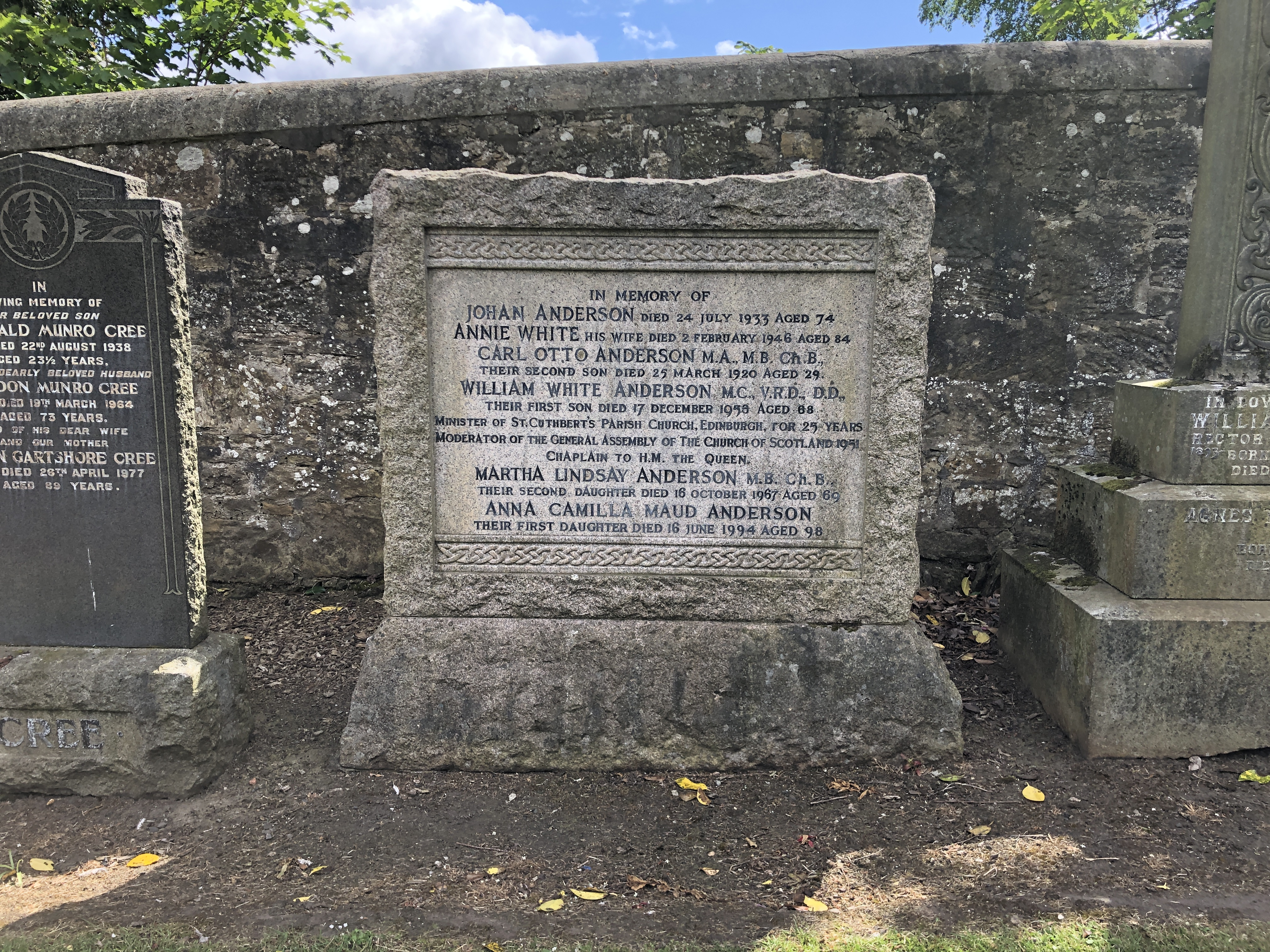
William White Anderson and family headstone, Bo'ness Cemetery, Dean Road

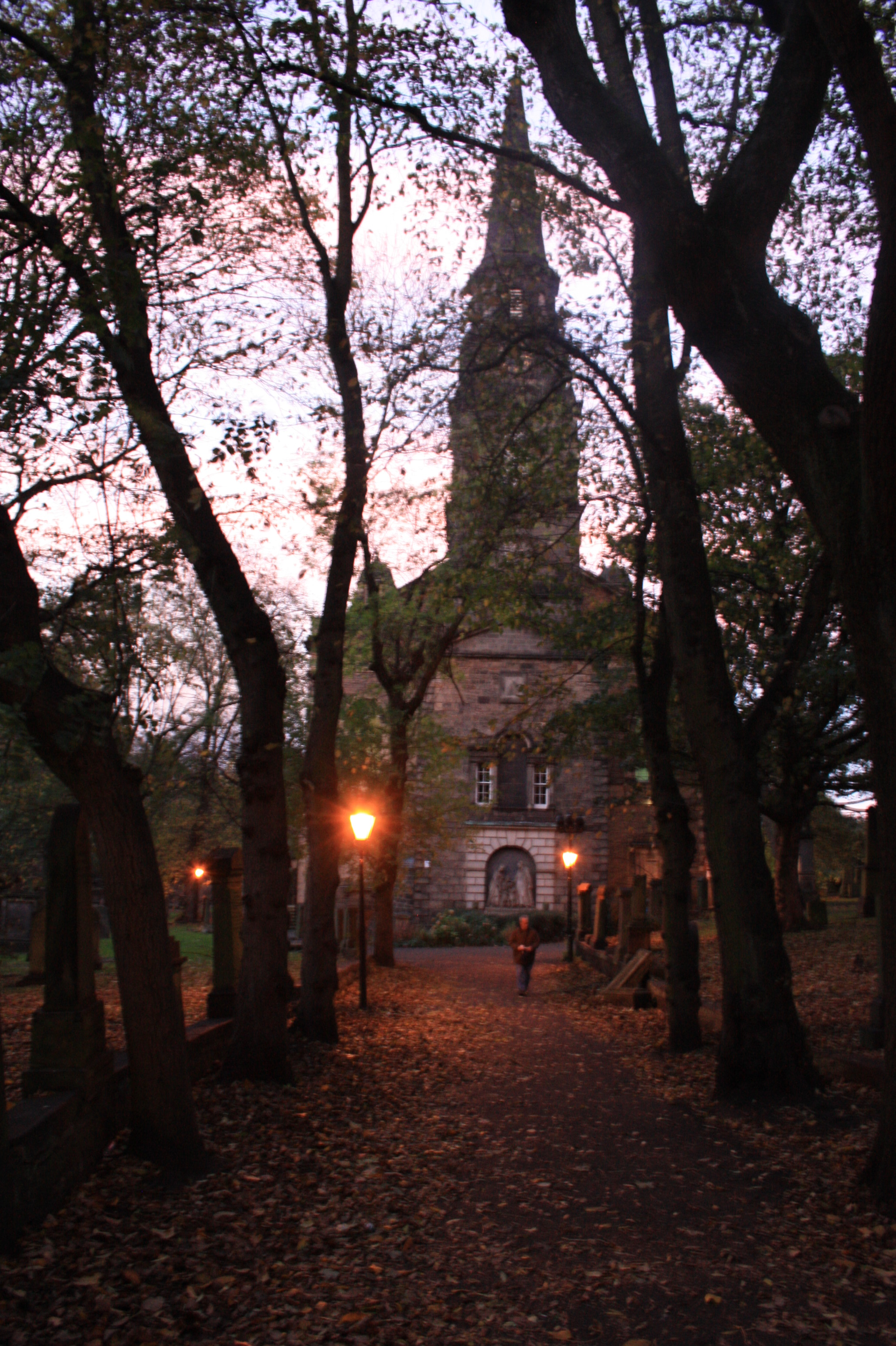
St Cuthberts in Edinburgh

William White Anderson MC (1888–1956) was a Scottish minister who served as Moderator of the General Assembly of the Church of Scotland in 1951. He was Chaplain in Scotland to both King George VI and Queen Elizabeth II.

== Life ==
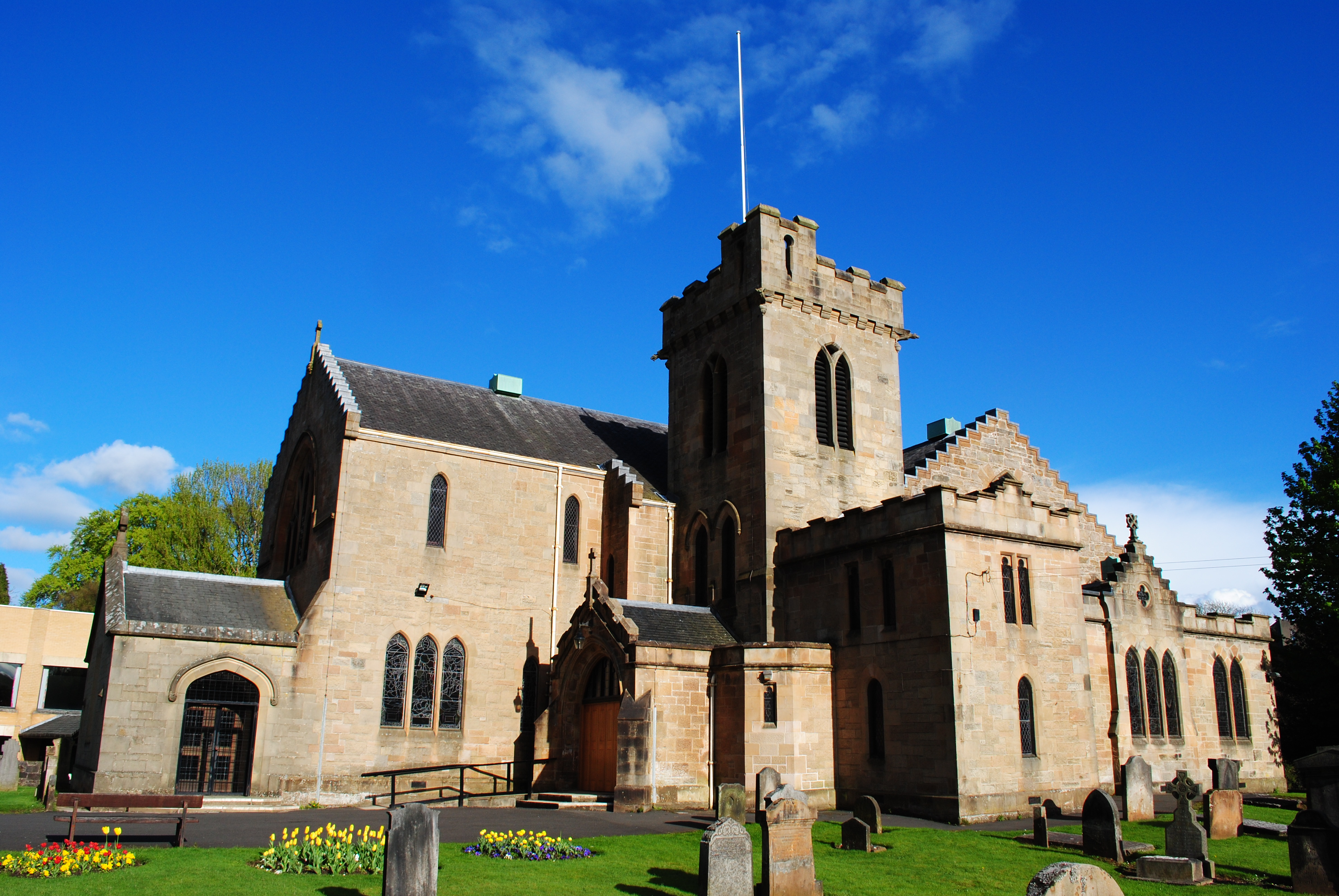
NewKilpatrick Parish Church

He was born on 17 March 1888 in Bo'ness. He was educated at Bo'ness Academy and then studied divinity at Glasgow University.

In 1912 he went to New Brunswick in Canada to run a mission. In the First World War he served as a Senior Chaplain to the 9th (Scottish) Division. He won the Military Cross in 1917.

In 1919 he returned to Glasgow as minister of Bellahouston Church. In 1926 he transferred to New Kilpatrick Church in Bearsden in northwest Glasgow. In 1931 he moved to Edinburgh as an assistant minister of St Cuthberts at the west end of Princes Street Gardens. Later promoted to Senior Minister he remained there for the rest of his working life.

In 1943 he received an honorary degree from the University of Glasgow.

In November 1949, he was appointed Chaplain to the King and the following year elected Moderator-elect of General Assembly of the Church of Scotland.

He died on 17 December 1956.
