= Andrew Beveridge Doig =

Scottish minister and missionary

Andrew Beveridge Doig (18 September 1914 – 21 December 1997) was a Scottish minister and African missionary of the Church of Scotland who served as Moderator of the General Assembly in 1981/2.

== Life ==
He was born in Carluke on 18 September 1914 the son of George Doig, a railway clerk, originally from Kirriemuir, and his wife Hannah Andrew Beveridge. He was educated at Hyndland Secondary School in Glasgow and attended the Broomhill Church there. He then studied Arts and Divinity at Glasgow University graduating BD around 1936. He then did postgraduate study at the Union Theological Seminary in New York City in the USA. Under the influence of his mother and the evangelist, D. P. Thomson, he was ordained as a Church of Scotland missionary in 1938, and sought to spread Christianity in Africa.

In April 1939 he went to Blantyre, Nyasaland to do missionary work for various churches. At the advent of the Second World War he became Army Chaplain to the King's African Rifles and served in Ethiopia and Kenya. In 1946 he became part of Nyasaland's Legislative Council.

In 1951 he met Hastings Banda in Nyasaland. Although originally seeing Banda as a good influence he ultimately ended in opposition to him when he was famously a Church of Scotland envoy asking for clemency at the trial of Orton Chirwa. This resulted in the death sentence being changed to life imprisonment.

In 1953 he was briefly a Member of Parliament for the short-lived Federation of Rhodesia and Nyasaland.

From 1962 to 1972 he was minister of Kings Park Church in Dalkeith. From 1972 to 1981 he was General Secretary of the National Bible Society of Scotland. He was an Executive Committee Member (representing Europe) for the United Bible Societies.

His role as Moderator came in 1981 immediately after his retirement from the National Bible Society. His most unusual duty during his term of office was to represent the Church of Scotland at the marriage of Prince Charles and Lady Diana. He was succeeded in 1982 by Very Rev John McIntyre.

He died in his cottage at Moulin near Pitlochry on 21 December 1997.

== Publications ==
- The Missionary Motive and the Missionary Approach (1939)
- Its People That Count (1997)

== Family ==
In 1940 he married fellow-missionary Annie Nicol ("Nan") Carruthers, who died in Nyasaland in 1947. They had one daughter.

In 1950 he married Barbara Young, headmistress of a girls school in Blantyre, Malawi (originally from Leven, Fife) in Leven. They had one son and one daughter.
