= Henry Whitley =

Church of Scotland minister (1906–1976)

Henry Charles Whitley CVO (1906–1976) was a Church of Scotland minister and an author.

He was born on 20 March 1906 and educated at George Heriot's School and the University of Edinburgh, where he gained a Ph.D. in 1953. He was Minister of Newark Parish Church (in Port Glasgow), Old Partick Parish Church and the High Kirk of Edinburgh; and a World War II chaplain with the Seaforth Highlanders. He was Dean of the Thistle from 1969 to 1974. In 1970 he was appointed Honorary Chaplain (Pontifex Maximus) of the Harveian Society of Edinburgh. Whitley died on 8 May 1976. He is buried in Southwick Kirkyard in Dumfriesshire.

Religious titles
Preceded by Charles Laing Warr	Dean of the Thistle; 1969 –1974	Succeeded by John McIntyre
