= William Morris (Church of Scotland minister) =

Scottish-based presbyterian minister

William James Morris KCVO JP (22 August 1925 – 31 October 2013) was a Church of Scotland minister and an author.

He was born in Cardiff on 22 August 1925 and educated at Cardiff High School and the University of Edinburgh, where he gained a PhD in 1954. He was Assistant Minister at Canongate Kirk and then Minister at the Presbyterian Church of Wales at Cadoxton and Barry Island. He then held further ministries at Buckhaven, St David's, Peterhead and Glasgow Cathedral.

While Minister of the Old Parish Church (or Muckle Kirk) in Peterhead, he was chaplain to Peterhead Prison.

He married Jean Howie, daughter of Rev. D. P. Howie Minister of The Laigh Kirk, Kilmarnock 1916–1966, on 3 September 1952. They had 1 son, David, born in 1960.

He was Dean of the Chapel Royal in Scotland from 1991 to 1996. An Honorary Chaplain to the Queen from 1969, he was also Chaplain to the Queen's Body Guard for Scotland (The Royal Company of Archers) from 1994 to 2007.

He died on 31 October 2013.

== Notes ==
Religious titles
Preceded by Robert A S Barbour	Dean of the Chapel Royal in Scotland; 1991–1996	Succeeded by James Harkness
