= Wallace Williamson =

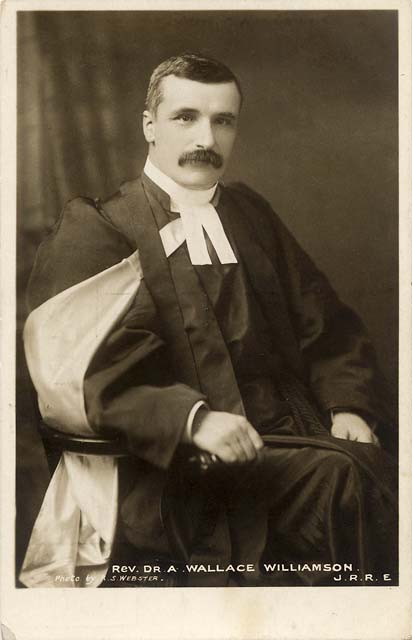
Rev Wallace Williamson

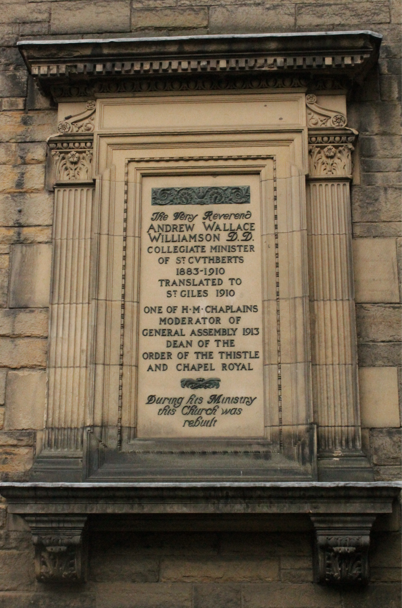
Memorial to Rev Andrew Wallace Williamson, St Cuthbert's Church

Andrew Wallace Williamson KCVO, (29 December 1856 – 10 July 1926) was a Church of Scotland minister who was Dean of the Thistle. He was Moderator of the General Assembly in 1913.

== Life ==
He was born in Thornhill in Dumfriesshire on 29 December 1856, the youngest son of James Williamson and his wife Margaret Wallace.

He was educated at Morton School and Wallace Hall then studied Divinity at the University of Edinburgh graduating MA in 1878. He was licensed to preach as a Church of Scotland minister by the Presbytery of Edinburgh in 1881.

Beginning as an assistant at North Leith Parish Church on Madeira Street in north Edinburgh, he was ordained as full minister there in 1882. He was then translated to St Cuthbert's Church in central Edinburgh in 1883. This was as the collegiate minister alongside Rev James MacGregor in first charge. During this time he was also a lecturer in pastoral theology at his alma mater. He received the honorary degree Doctor of Divinity (DD) from the University of St Andrews in 1900. In January 1910 he was appointed first minister at St Giles' Cathedral and the following year Dean of the Thistle and Dean of the Chapel Royal. In 1913 he was elected Moderator of the General Assembly of the Church of Scotland, the highest position in the Scottish church.

In 1912 he was appointed Honorary Chaplain (Pontifex Maximus) of the Harveian Society of Edinburgh.

Williamson was largely responsible for co-ordinating the huge rebuilding project at St Cuthbert's by architect Hippolyte Blanc in 1892-4. This was partially funded by his predecessor Rev James Veitch. As a somewhat immodest part of the rebuilding he included a plaque to himself on the outer west face and to Rev James MacGregor the first charge minister balancing his memorial on the opposite side of the tower.

He lived at 44 Palmerston Place in Edinburgh's fashionable West End.

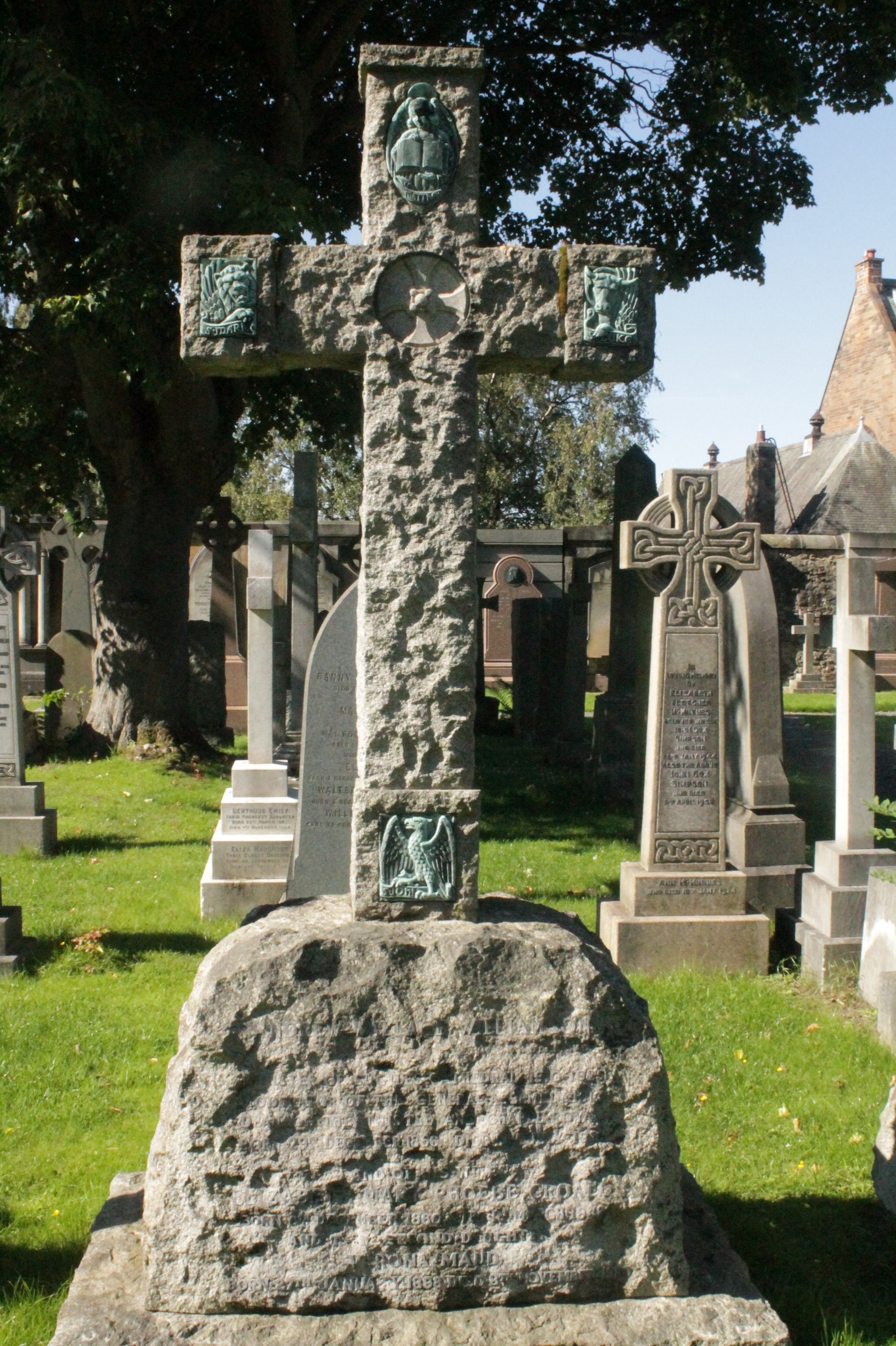
The grave of Rev A W Williamson, Dean Cemetery, Edinburgh

An Honorary Chaplain to the King, he died on 10 July 1926 and is buried on the central path of the northern extension to Dean Cemetery in western Edinburgh. His position at St Cuthberts was filled by William Lyall Wilson.

His biography was written by Lord Sands.

His more noteworthy roles included conducting the funeral of Sir Hector MacDonald and being on the committee for the design and building of the Scottish National War Memorial.

== Family ==
Williamson married Agnes Blackstock, the daughter of Walter Blackstock, in 1883. They had no children. Blackstock died in 1885.

In 1888, Williamson married Elizabeth Mary Phoebe Croall, the daughter of Robert Croall of Craigcrook Castle. They had two daughters and a son:

- Agnes Honor Margaret Williamson (1889-1892), died in infancy
- Robert Howard Wallace Williamson (1892-1962), buried in Warriston Cemetery
- Verona Maud Williamson (1896-1980), buried in Dean Cemetery

== Publications ==
- The Methodist Church (1884)
- The Place and Power of Woman (1892)
- Social Unrest (1895)
- Ideals of Ministry (1901)
- Dr John MacLeod: His Work and Teraching (1901)
- A Farewell Message of St Paul
- The Person of Christ in the Faith of the Church
- Ambassadors for Christ (1910)

Religious titles
Preceded by James Cameron Lees	Dean of the Chapel Royal in Scotland; 1910–1925	Succeeded by Charles Laing Warr
Preceded by James Cameron Lees	Dean of the Thistle; 1910–1925	Succeeded by Charles Laing Warr
Preceded by Samuel Marcus Dill	Moderator of the General Assembly of the Church of Scotland; 1913–1914	Succeeded by Thomas Nicol
