= Robin Barbour =

Robert Alexander Stewart "Robin" Barbour KCVO MC (11 May 1921 – 18 October 2014) was a Church of Scotland minister and an author.

Robin Barbour was born on 11 May 1921 in Edinburgh to George Freeland Barbour and Helen Hepburne-Scott. His father, the laird of Bonskeid, Pitlochry, was a distinguished philosopher and theologian. Initially he was educated at Cargilfield Preparatory School in Edinburgh then at Rugby.

He joined Balliol College, Oxford, before the outbreak of World War II, during which he served in the Italian campaign with Scottish Horse. Barbour was awarded the Military Cross in recognition of his distinguished service during the war.

After the war, Barbour graduated from Balliol with a double first in classics and philosophy. He first obtained a teaching qualification in Edinburgh before studying divinity at the University of St Andrews, and later studying also at Yale University.

A minister since 1954, he was for many years a lecturer in divinity at the University of Edinburgh and Professor of New Testament Exegesis at the University of Aberdeen from 1971 to 1982. He was elected Moderator of the General Assembly of the Church of Scotland from 1979 to 1980 and was the youngest in living memory to be appointed.

In 1981, Barbour was appointed Dean of the Chapel Royal in Scotland and served this ministry until 1991. An Honorary Chaplain to the Queen, he was also a chaplain of the Order of St John of Jerusalem.

Barbour married in 1950 and had four children. He retired in 1986, remaining active in church ministry. He died on 18 October 2014 in Perth, Scotland.

Religious titles
| Preceded by Peter Brodie | Moderator of the General Assembly of the Church of Scotland; 1979 –1980 | Succeeded by William Bryce Johnston |
| Preceded by Hugh Osborne Douglas | Dean of the Chapel Royal in Scotland; 1981–1991 | Succeeded by William James Morris |
