= Dean of the Chapel Royal =

Dean of the Chapel Royal, in any kingdom, can be the title of an official charged with oversight of that kingdom's royal chapel, the ecclesiastical establishment which is part of the royal household and ministers to it.

== England ==
Dean of the Chapels Royal or, more formally, Dean of His Majesty's Chapels Royal, is an office held by a prelate in the Royal Household of the United Kingdom. Under the Sovereign, the dean has oversight both of the Chapel Royal (organisation) and of the chapels royal (places of worship) which fall within its remit. A separate Dean of the Chapel Royal is appointed for Scotland (see below).

The office of dean is first recorded in 1349; since 1748 it has been by custom been held by the Bishop of London. In practice, the chapel, its choir, and the various chapel buildings associated with it come under the day-to-day supervision of the Sub-Dean of the Chapels Royal, who is also the king's domestic chaplain.

As of 2019 the Chapels Royal in England are: the Chapel Royal, St James's Palace; The Queen's Chapel, St James's Palace; the Chapel Royal, Hampton Court Palace; the Chapel Royal of St Peter ad Vincula (in the Tower of London); the Chapel of St John the Evangelist (in the Tower of London); and The King's Chapel of the Savoy.

=== Origin of the office ===
In the early medieval Household the Chancellor (who was always a clerk in Holy Orders) was head of the chapel, but by the 14th century the Chancellor's duties of state had taken him out of the Household. Subsequently the dean would take on oversight of the chapel; but the office of dean emerged and evolved gradually. The Household ordinances of 1318 identify three senior clerics of the Household: the Confessor, Almoner and Chief Chaplain. Then, in 1349, mention is found of a John Wodeford, described as a king's clerk 'and dean of his chapel'. By 1478 the Black Book of the Household of Edward IV describes the 'Dean of Chapel' as 'the King's Chief Chaplain after the Confessor'; (the Confessor was always a bishop, the dean at this stage was not).

==== Duties ====
Walter Ullmann describes the medieval Chapel Royal as being akin to 'a perambulating bishopric in constant and personal attendance on the king and his entourage'. The dean, as executive head of the chapel, answered only to the king, or (in his absence) the Lord Chamberlain. His principal duties were liturgical and ceremonial, but he also had juridical authority and educational responsibilities. According to the Liber Regie Capelle (written in 1449 by the then dean, William Say), the dean of the chapel had 'authority and power to order and administer all the sacraments and all sacramental rites within the chapel' and was also empowered to exercise 'the original jurisdiction of an archdeacon and the secondary jurisdiction of a bishop in criminal causes and the proving of wills'. According to Say, the dean's jurisdiction extended over all the servants and household of the king and queen, 'of whatever dignity, estate or condition they may be'.

==== Later developments ====
In the early Tudor period, it was invariably the case that if a Dean of the Chapel Royal was made a bishop he would relinquish the office of dean. Richard Sampson, however, a prolific pluralist, having been made Bishop of Chichester in 1526 remained as dean (as well as retaining several other clerical offices). He was deprived of the deanery in 1540; his successor, Thomas Thirlby, was already a bishop when appointed dean of the chapel. Subsequent practice varied, but since the Restoration those appointed as dean have invariably been in episcopal orders.

Under Elizabeth I the office of dean was placed in abeyance for around two decades and the Lord Chamberlain, Henry Carey, was given oversight of the chapel instead; this development may have been connected with the establishment of the Blackfriars Theatre, where the Children of the Chapel worked as actors.

In 1721, Edmund Gibson was appointed 'Dean of His [Majesty's] Chapel Royal', but since 1762 the appointment has been gazetted as 'Dean of His Majesty's Chapels Royal'.

=== Office holders ===
Edward III (1327)

- c. 1349: John de Wodeford
- c. 1356: John de Leek

Richard II (1377)

- c. 1380: Thomas de Lynton (canon of Windsor, 1378–1387)
- c. 1389: John Boor (canon of Windsor, 1389–1402)

Henry IV (1399)

- c. 1400: Richard Kyngeston, Archdeacon of Hereford and canon of Windsor
- c. 1403: Richard Prentys, Archdeacon of West Ham and canon of Windsor

Henry V (1413)

- 1414: Edmund Lacey, canon of Windsor (became Bishop of Hereford, 1417)
- 1417–1432: Robert Gilbert (later Bishop of London, 1436)

Henry VI (1422)

- 1432–1438: Richard Praty (became Bishop of Chichester, 1438)
- 1438–1444: John Croucher, Dean of Chichester
- 1444–1449 (d.): Robert Ayscogh (possibly Robert Aiscough, later Archdeacon of Exeter)
- 1449–1468 (d.): William Say, Dean of St Paul's from 1457 and Archdeacon of Northampton from 1464

Edward IV (1461);Henry VI (restored 1470)

- 1469–1470 (d.): Thomas Bonyfaunt

Edward IV (restored 1471)

- c. 1471: William Dudley, canon then Dean of Windsor (became Bishop of Durham)
- 1476: John Gunthorpe, Dean of Wells and, until 1478, Archdeacon of Essex
- c. 1483: William Chauntre, Archdeacon of Derby

Richard III (1483)

- 1483: William Beverley, Dean of Middleham, Yorkshire

Henry VII (1485)

- 1485–1489: Richard Hill (later Bishop of London, 1489–1496)
- by 1491: Geoffrey Simeon (later Dean of Lincoln)
- 1497–1499: Thomas Jane (later Bishop of Norwich, 1499–1500)
- 1499–1501: Richard Nikke, Archdeacon of Wells (later Bishop of Norwich, 1501–1535)
- 1502–1514: William Atwater, canon of Windsor 1504–1514 (later Bishop of Lincoln, 1514–1526)

Henry VIII (1509)

- 1514–1519: John Vesey (later Bishop of Exeter, 1519–1551)
- 1519–1523: John Clark (later Bishop of Bath and Wells, 1523–1541)
- 1523–1540: Richard Sampson, Bishop of Chichester 1536–1543
- 1540–1558: Thomas Thirlby, Bishop of Westminster 1540–1550

Edward VI (1547)
Mary I (1553)
Elizabeth I (1558)

- 1558–1583: George Carew, Dean of Bristol
- 1583–1603: No appointment

James I (1603)

- 1603–1618: James Montague, Dean of Lichfield
- 1618–1626: Lancelot Andrewes, Bishop of Ely until 1619, then Bishop of Winchester

Charles I (1625)

- 1626: William Laud, Bishop of St David's until 1626, then Bishop of Bath and Wells until 1628, then Bishop of London until 1633, then Archbishop of Canterbury
- 1643–?1651: Richard Steward (Provost of Eton and Dean of St Paul's (but not installed), 1642–1651))

Commonwealth (1649)
Charles II (1660)

- 7 June 1660: Gilbert Sheldon, Bishop of London
- 2 October 1663: George Morley, Bishop of Winchester
- 7 February 1668: Herbert Croft, Bishop of Hereford
- 5 April 1669: Walter Blandford, Bishop of Oxford until 1671, then Bishop of Worcester
- 15 July 1675: Henry Compton, Bishop of London

James II (1685)

- 28 December 1685: Nathaniel Crew, Bishop of Durham

William III (1689)

- 20 September 1689: Henry Compton, Bishop of London (again)

Anne (1702)

- 17 July 1713: John Robinson, Bishop of Bristol until 1714, then Bishop of London

George I (1714)

- 15 March 1718: William Talbot, Bishop of Salisbury until 1721, then Bishop of Durham

George II (1727)

- 17 November 1721: Edmund Gibson, Bishop of Lincoln until 1723, then Bishop of London
- 1 December 1748: Thomas Sherlock, Bishop of London

George III (1760)

- 19 September 1761: Thomas Hayter, Bishop of London
- 19 February 1762: Richard Osbaldeston, Bishop of London
- 8 June 1764: Richard Terrick, Bishop of London
- 9 May 1777: Robert Lowth, Bishop of London
- 29 November 1787: Beilby Porteus, Bishop of London
- 8 July 1809: John Randolph, Bishop of London
- 28 October 1813: William Howley, Bishop of London

George IV (1820)

- 29 August 1828: Charles James Blomfield, Bishop of London

William IV (1830)
Victoria (1837)

- 27 October 1857: Archibald Campbell Tait, Bishop of London
- 29 January 1869: John Jackson, Bishop of London
- 25 March 1885: Frederick Temple, Bishop of London
- 20 February 1897: Mandell Creighton, Bishop of London

Edward VII (1901)

- 14 March 1901: Arthur Winnington-Ingram, Bishop of London

George V (1910)
Edward VIII (1936)
George VI (1936)

- 1 September 1939: Geoffrey Fisher, Bishop of London
- 27 July 1945: William Wand, Bishop of London

Elizabeth II (1952)

- 20 January 1956: Henry Montgomery Campbell, Bishop of London
- 17 October 1961: Robert Stopford, Bishop of London
- 18 July 1973: Gerald Ellison, Bishop of London
- 21 July 1981: Graham Leonard, Bishop of London
- 10 July 1991: David Michael Hope, Bishop of London
- 1995: Richard Chartres, Bishop of London
- 11 July 2019: Dame Sarah Mullally, Bishop of London

Charles III (2022)

==== Note ====
Since 1748, the office of Dean has almost invariably been held by the Bishop of London. Occasionally, retired Bishops of London have retained the office of Dean for a time after resigning their See. For example, Charles James Blomfield retired in 1856, but was not replaced as Dean until after his death the following year. In 2017 Richard Chartres, following his retirement as Bishop of London, remained as Dean while Sarah Mullally became accustomed to her various duties and responsibilities as the new Bishop of London; as such he assisted at the Baptism of Prince Louis on 9 July 2018 and the traditional Epiphany service at the Chapel Royal on 6 January 2019. In July 2019 Chartres retired as Dean of the Chapels Royal and Mullally took up the appointment.

== Scotland ==
In Scotland, the title first appears in the fifteenth century, when it may have referred to a prebend in the church of St Mary on the Rock, St Andrews. In 1501 James IV founded a new Chapel Royal in Stirling Castle, but from 1504 onwards the deanery was held by successive bishops of Galloway with the title of Bishop of the Chapel Royal and authority over all the royal palaces within Scotland. The deanery was annexed to the bishopric of Dunblane in 1621, and the Chapel Royal was removed to Holyrood.

The office of dean was suppressed with the abolition of prelacy in 1689, and the revenues of the Chapel Royal reverted to the Crown. Grants from these revenues were made to individual Church of Scotland ministers and from 1727 onwards part was allocated to three royal chaplains, known collectively as the Deans of the Chapel Royal. Replacement of these chaplains by professors of the Divinity Faculties in the University of Glasgow, the University of Aberdeen, the University of Edinburgh and the University of St Andrews took place between 1860 and 1868. In 1886 the office of Dean was revived and united by royal warrant to that of Dean of the Thistle, eventually being separated in 1969. Under the 1886 royal warrant, the Dean is also titular Abbot of Crossraguel and Abbot of Dundrennan.

=== Office holders since revival ===
- 1787–1792: George Hill, also Dean of the Thistle
- 1792–1803: Archibald Davidson (Principal of the University of Glasgow), also Dean of the Thistle
- 1803–1830: William Laurence Brown, also Dean of the Thistle
- 1830–1845: George Cook, also Dean of the Thistle
- 1845–1869: William Muir, also Dean of the Thistle
- 1869–1872: Norman Macleod, also Dean of the Thistle
- 1872–1882: John MacLeod, also Dean of the Thistle
- 1882–1887: John Tulloch (Principal of the University of St. Andrews), also Dean of the Thistle
- 1887–1910: Cameron Lees, Minister of St Giles' Cathedral until 1906 and Dean of the Thistle
- 1910–1926: Wallace Williamson, Minister of St Giles' Cathedral and Dean of the Thistle
- 1926–1969: Charles Warr, Dean of the Thistle and sometime Minister of St Giles' Cathedral
- 1969–1973: James Longmuir, sometime Minister at Chirnside
- 1974–1981: Hugh Douglas, Minister at Dundee until 1977
- 1981–1991: Robin Barbour, New Testament professor, University of Aberdeen
- 1991–1996: William Morris, Minister of Glasgow Cathedral
- 1996–2006: James Harkness, Chaplain-in-Ordinary to the Queen
- 2006–2013: John Cairns, Minister at Riverside Parish Church, Dumbarton
- 2013–2019: Iain Torrance, Pro-Chancellor, University of Aberdeen, Chaplain-in-Ordinary to the Queen and Dean of the Thistle
- 2019–present: David Fergusson, Professor of Divinity, University of Edinburgh, Chaplain-in-Ordinary to the Queen and Dean of the Thistle

== Ireland ==
The Chapel Royal (Irish: Séipéal Ríoga) in Dublin Castle was the official Church of Ireland chapel of the Household of the lord lieutenant of Ireland from 1814 until the creation of the Irish Free State in 1922. From 1831, the principal chaplain to the Lord Lieutenant was usually styled Dean of the Chapel Royal.

=== Office holders ===
- 1831–1843: Charles Vignoles, Dean of Ossory from 1843
- 1843–1860: Usher Tighe, Dean of Leighlin until 1854, then Dean of Ardagh until 1858 (became Dean of Derry)
- 1860–1866: Charles Graves, Dean of Clonfert from 1864 (became Bishop of Limerick, Ardfert and Aghadoe)
- 1866–1868: William Connor Magee, Dean of Cork (became Bishop of Peterborough)
- 1868–1905: Hercules Dickinson (died 1905)
- 1905–1913: Reginald Godfrey Michael Webster (Acting Dean from c. 1902)
- 1913–1922: Charles O'Hara Mease (died 21st May 1922)

== Bibliography ==
- Baldwin, David (1990). The Chapel Royal: Ancient and Modern. London: Gerald Duckworth & Co. Ltd.
- Bickersteth, John; Dunning, Robert W. (1991). Clerks of the Closet in the Royal Household. Stroud, Gloucs.: Alan Sutton.
- Bucholz, R. O., ed. (2006). "The Chapel Royal: Deans and Sub-Deans". Office-Holders in Modern Britain: Volume 11 (Revised), Court Officers, 1660-1837. London: University of London.
- Hillebrand, Harold (1920). The Early History of the Chapel Royal. Modern Philology. p. 243.

== See also ==
- List of deans in the Church of England
- Church of England deans
- Ecclesiastical Household
