= Dean of the Thistle =

Office of the Order of the Thistle

The Dean of the Thistle is an office of the Order of the Thistle, re-established in 1687. The office is normally held by a minister of the Church of Scotland, and forms part of the Royal Household in Scotland.

In 1886 the office of Dean of the Chapel Royal was revived and united by royal warrant to that of Dean of the Thistle, eventually being separated in 1969.

== Office holders ==
- 1763: John Jardine (1716–1766)
- 1767: Robert Hamilton
- 1787: George Hill
- 1791: Archibald Davidson
- 1803: William Laurence Brown
- 1830: George Cook
- 1845: William Muir (1787–1869)
- 1869: Norman Macleod (1812–1872)
- 1872: John Macleod
- 1882: John Tulloch (1823–1886)
- 1886: James Cameron Lees (1834–1913)
- 1910–1926: Andrew Wallace Williamson (1856–1926)
- 1926–1969: Charles Laing Warr (1892–1969)
- 1969–1974: Henry Charles Whitley (1906–1976)
- 1974–1989: John McIntyre (1916–2005)
- 1989–2014: Gilleasbuig Iain Macmillan
- 2014–2019: Iain Torrance
- 2019–present: David Fergusson
