= Doull =

Doull is a surname that is sourced mainly to Scotland, England, and Ireland. Doull is a variant of the Gaelic name MacDomhnall which means 'son of Donald'. Variants included Donnell, Donaldson and Doole.

== People with the surname Doull ==
- Alexander Doull (1870–1933), Anglican bishop
- Bruce Doull (born 1950), former Australian rules football player
- Doug Doull (born 1974), Canadian ice hockey player
- James Doull (1918–2001), Canadian philosopher
- John Doull (1878–1969), Canadian judge and politician
- Judi Doull (born 1938), New Zealand cricketer
- Lincoln Doull (born 1964), New Zealand cricketer
- Owain Doull (born 1993), Welsh cyclist
- Robert Doull (1828–1906), Canadian politician
- Simon Doull (born 1969), New Zealand cricketer
