= Theodore Woods =

British bishop

- Bishop of Winchester
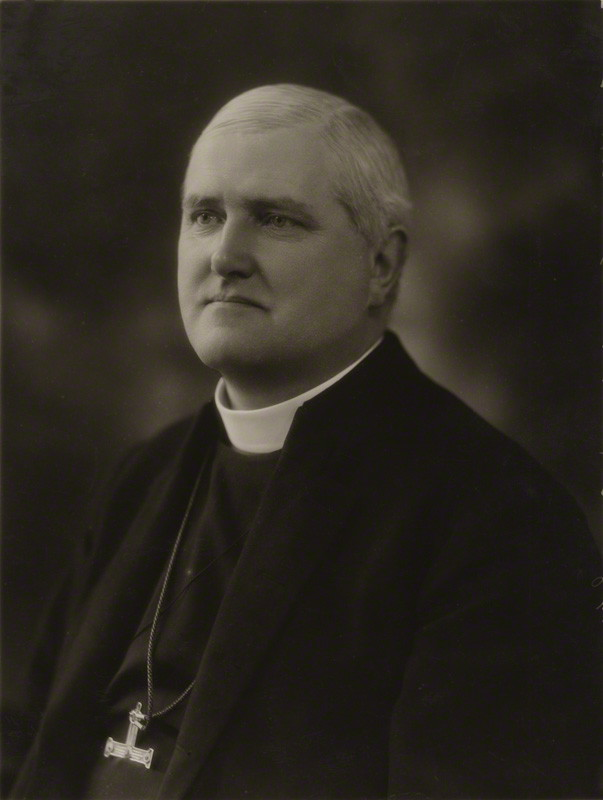
- Woods in 1924
- Diocese: Winchester
- In office: 1923 – 1932 (d.)
- Predecessor: Edward Talbot
- Successor: Cyril Garbett
- Other post: Bishop of Peterborough (1916–1923)

Orders
- Ordination: 1897 (deacon); 1898 (priest) by Ernest Wilberforce (Chichester)
- Consecration: 1916 by Randall Davidson (Canterbury)

Personal details
- Born: 15 January 1874
- Died: 27 February 1932 (aged 58)
- Denomination: Anglican
- Parents: Frank Woods, Alice Fry
- Children: 3
- Education: Trinity College, Cambridge

Frank Theodore Woods (15 January 1874 – 27 February 1932) was a Church of England bishop. He was the Bishop of Peterborough from 1916 to 1923 before being translated to the See of Winchester, where he remained until his death.

== Family and education ==
He was the son of Frank Woods (a priest) and a grandson of the civil engineer Edward Woods. His mother, Alice Fry, was a granddaughter of the prison reformer Elizabeth Fry. His brother Edward was Bishop of Lichfield from 1937 to 1953 and was the father of the photographer Janet Woods, Samuel Woods, an archdeacon in New Zealand; Frank Woods, Archbishop of Melbourne; and Robin Woods, Bishop of Worcester. Theodore himself was educated at Marlborough College and Trinity College, Cambridge.

== Ministry ==
He was made deacon on Trinity Sunday 1897 (13 June) at Chichester Cathedral, and ordained priest the following Trinity Sunday (5 June 1898) at Brighton Parish Church — both times by Ernest Wilberforce, Bishop of Chichester. After a curacy in Eastbourne he held incumbencies in Huddersfield, Brixton, Kersal, Bishop Auckland and Bradford.

He was consecrated a bishop on St Matthew's Day 1916 (21 September), by Randall Davidson, Archbishop of Canterbury, at Westminster Abbey, to serve as Bishop of Peterborough. While Bishop of Peterborough, Woods served as episcopal secretary for the 1920 Lambeth Conference.

His appointment to Peterborough had come midway through the First World War. The Church Times later described him thus, "He was an admirable war Bishop. His palace was turned into a hospital, and he showed both courage and understanding in facing war problems." He was keen not to have Germany humiliated in the peace process, writing that a just settlement was needed which the Germans themselves 'shall acknowledge to be just. We must take care to leave no open wounds.' However, the politicians chose to punish Germany, and many regard that 'open wound' as an origin of the Second World War.

He became a Doctor of Divinity; as Bishop of Winchester, Woods was Prelate of the Most Noble Order of the Garter.

== Politics and legacy ==
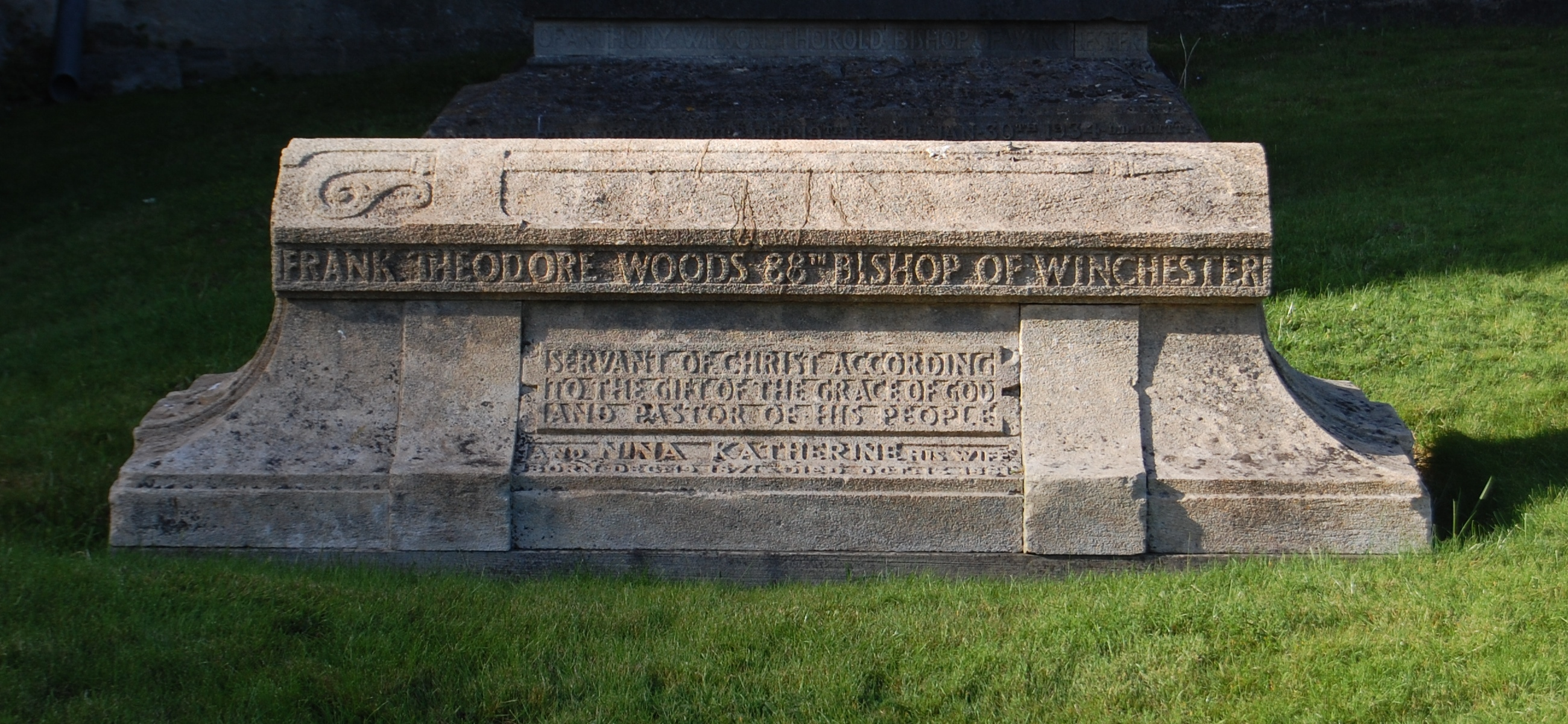
The tomb of Bishop Woods at Winchester Cathedral

Woods was also enthusiastic about "Votes for Women". He believed that "It may be that their entrance into the political arena will lead to a spring-cleaning of the whole political machine ... and that the whole outlook of political life will be ... more concerned with the nation's welfare as a whole." Women were enfranchised in 1918 in the UK and could vote in parliamentary elections, but they had to be at least 30 years of age.

After Woods's death, the Bishop of London wrote that "He was a true example of a manly Christian, a giant in stature and virile in character. He had been of special help to them all in applying Christianity to social questions ..."

== Works ==
- Frank Theodore Woods and others, Lambeth and Reunion: An Interpretation of the Mind of the Lambeth Conference of 1920 (Society for Promoting Christian Knowledge, 1921).

Church of England titles
Preceded by Edward Glyn	Bishop of Peterborough; 1916–1923	Succeeded by Cyril Bardsley
Preceded by Edward Talbot	Bishop of Winchester; 1923–1932	Succeeded by Cyril Garbett
