= New Beacon School =

The New Beacon

Location
- Brittains Lane; Sevenoaks, Kent, TN13 2PB; England
- Coordinates: 51.2621°N 0.1769°E

Information
- Former name: The Beacon School
- Type: Preparatory School
- Motto: Latin: Ex Fumo Dare Lucem (Give light out of darkness)
- Established: 1863; 163 years ago
- Founder: John S. Norman
- Head: Sarah Brownsdon
- Gender: Boys
- Age: 4 to 13
- Enrolment: c. 360
- Colours: Red and navy
- Website: www.newbeacon.org.uk

The New Beacon Preparatory School is an independent all-boys preparatory school, located at Sevenoaks in the English county of Kent. It admits both day students and boarders aged between 4 and 13. The school also now offers a co-educational nursery for children 3 years of age and over. The school was founded in 1863, and has been on the current site since 1900. It had 62 students in 1913, and had grown to 400 students by 2008.

== History ==
In the spring term 1882, John Stewart Norman and his friend Frank Ritchie took over The Beacon, which had been established as a preparatory school in 1863 at 18 St John's Road, Sevenoaks. As the numbers in the school grew, larger premises were needed, leading to the decision in October 1897 to build a new boarding school in Sevenoaks. Land was acquired from Lord Amherst's Montreal Park estate at Cross Keys, and construction of The New Beacon began in February 1899. The new building was ready by the end of the Autumn Term 1899.

In January 1900 the New Beacon opened for the (continued) education of boys in a building with a capacity for 60 boarders. The exterior of the building changed little over the century, but the addition of a chapel in 1912 meant that the children no longer had to walk to Kippington. By 1913 the school had grown to 62 pupils and the fees were £120 per year for boarding and tuition, plus £1 11s 6d for medical attendance. Other facilities included swimming baths, a miniature rifle range, a playground and two sports fields. During the First World War, staffing was depleted and the school's grounds and gardens had to be tended by staff and pupils. Just over two decades later, during the Second World War, the New Beacon continued with, as at 16 September 1939, 35 boarders. Female staff were recruited and some girls were educated at the school during the war. Thirty-seven former pupils were killed during the First World War, including John Alexander Thynne, Viscount Weymouth, eldest son of the 5th Marquess of Bath, killed near Vermelles on 16 February 1916. Another 75 Beaconians fell in the Second World War. Their names are noted on a memorial in the chapel.

=== Post-war changes and the increase in day boys ===
After the war numbers continued to grow and the roll call was over 120 pupils in 1948. Over the next few decades, the school tripled in size. The appointment of Rowland Constantine in 1976 saw the end of a long run of headmasters from the Norman family; Constantine was in post for 32 years.

The New Beacon is now predominantly a day school. In 2008 Mike Piercy was appointed as Headmaster and served until 2023. Mrs Sarah Brownsdon is the current incumbent.

== Notable alumni ==
=== Arts and literature ===
- Robert Byron, travel writer
- Henry Green, novelist
- Anthony Powell, novelist
- Siegfried Sassoon, World War I poet

=== Military ===
- Air Vice Marshall Cresswell Clementi,
- Brigadier Archer Clive, was a British Army officer who served during World War II
- Vice Admiral Sir Timothy Laurence, second husband of Anne, Princess Royal
- Philip Norton Banks, British colonial Inspector-General of Police in Ceylon
- Lieutenant-General Sir Richard Anderson (British Army officer)

=== Politics ===
- Sir Sherard Cowper-Coles, diplomat
- Sir Daniel William Lascelles, diplomat
- Charles Thomas Mills, Conservative politician and Baby of the House, killed in action in World War I
- Arthur Mills, 3rd Baron Hillingdon, Conservative politician
- Lord Mayhew of Twysden, former Secretary of State for Northern Ireland
- William Donald Massey Sumner, British Conservative M.P. and later a judge

=== Sport ===
- Sam Billings, Kent and England cricketer
- Douglas Carr, cricketer
- Joseph Choong, modern pentathlete and Olympic gold medallist at Tokyo 2020
- Zak Crawley, Kent and England cricketer
- Eliot Druce, cricketer
- Ben Earl, Saracens and England rugby player

=== Church ===
- Edward Sydney Woods, Bishop of Croydon and Bishop of Lichfield
- Robert Wilmer Woods, Bishop of Worcester and Dean of Windsor
- Frank Woods, Archbishop of Melbourne

=== Other ===
- Charles Ede, founder of the Folio Society
- John Fremantle, 4th Baron Cottesloe
- Sir Guy Newey, Lord Justice of Appeal
- Henry Thynne, 6th Marquess of Bath, landowner, creator of Longleat safari park
- Bill Bruford, drummer, founding member of the progressive rock band YES
- Colin Coote, British journalist and Liberal politician
- Alan Moses, former Lord Justice of Appeal, a Court of Appeal Judge and the former chairman of Independent Press Standards Organisation
- Norman Barrett, thoracic surgeon

== Headmasters ==
The Beacon

- John Stewart Norman and Frank Ritchie, Joint Headmasters 1882–1900

The New Beacon

- John Stewart Norman 1900-1929
- Frank Norman, Headmaster; and Cecil Norman, Assistant Master 1929–1945
- Cecil Norman 1945–1964
- Denis Pratten 1964
- John Norman 1964–1976
- Rowland Constantine 1976–2008
- Michael Piercy 2008–2023
- Sarah Brownsdon 2023–Present

== Controversy ==
In 2014, the Charity Commission for England and Wales urged New Beacon School to apologise to a former pupil in respect of statements made by the school to the Press. The statements related to allegations made by the boy against Paul Woodward, a former music teacher, for abusing him at the school between 2005 and 2006. In 2013, the Criminal Injuries Compensation Authority (CICA) made an award to the boy in compensation for the abuse the CICA found he had suffered. The Sevenoaks Chronicle reported that Woodward, who was convicted of sexual misconduct offences against other children and sent to prison indefinitely had been suspended from his post at the school during a previous police investigation involving allegations of sexual abuse but had been allowed back to work by a previous headmaster. The school apologised to the child in 2015, and applauded him for his bravery in bringing Woodward to justice. The victim said that the apology came "too late".
