= Edward Woods (engineer) =

- Born: 28 April 1814; London
- Died: 14 June 1903 (aged 89); London
- Education: private schooling
- Spouse: Mary Goodman
- Children: Three sons and two daughters
- Engineering career
- Discipline: Civil
- Institutions: Institution of Civil Engineers (president), Smeatonian Society of Civil Engineers (president), British Association (president of mechanical science)
- Projects: Wapping Tunnel, Victoria Tunnel

Edward Woods FRSA (28 April 1814 – 14 June 1903) was a British civil engineer.

== Early life and career ==
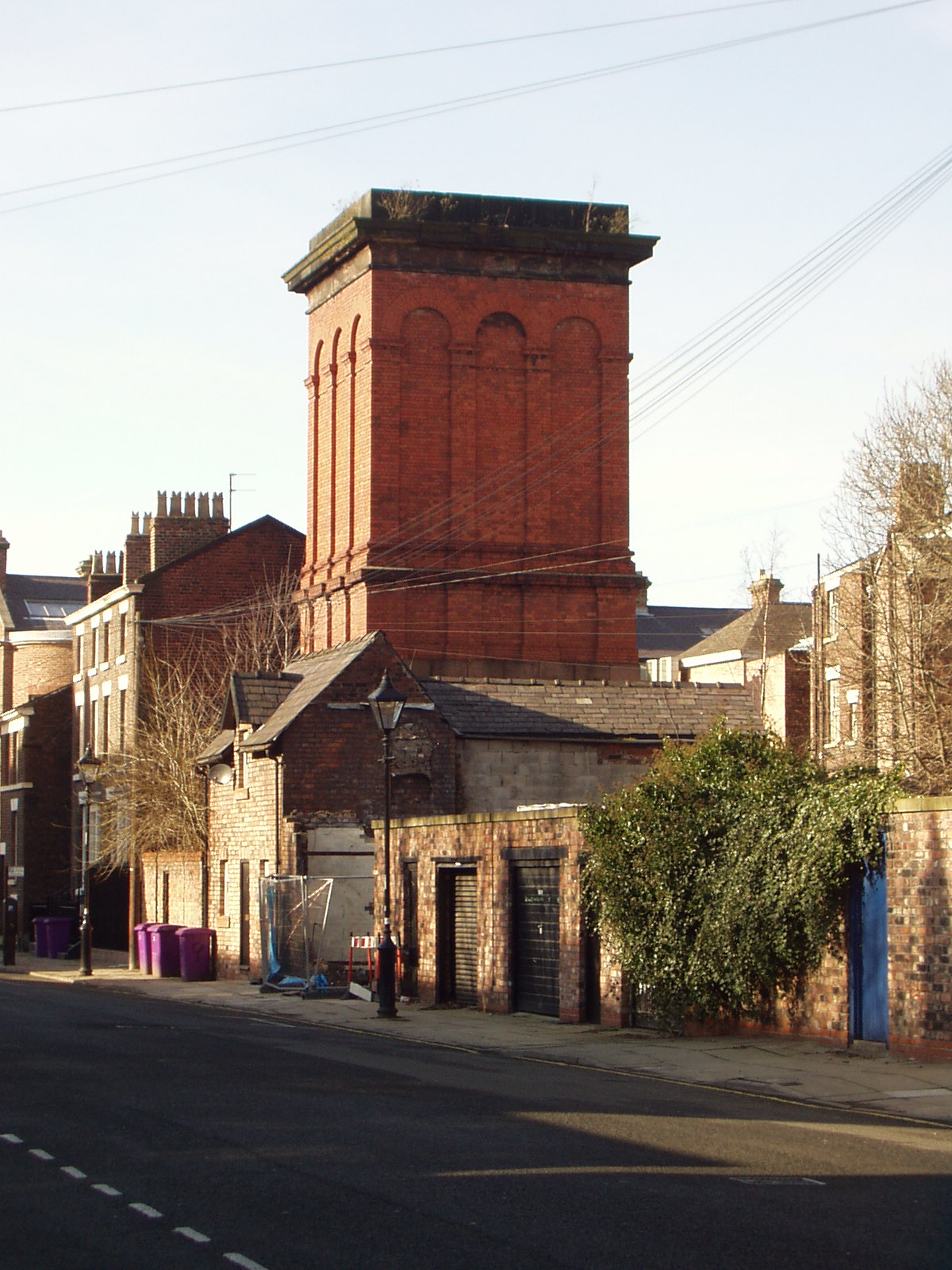
Ventilation shaft of the Wapping Tunnel, Liverpool

Woods was born in London on 28 April 1814, the son of Samuel Woods, a merchant. His younger brother, Joseph Woods was also an engineer and in 1844 became a founding partner of Dewrance & Co. Ltd. After education at private schools, and some training at Bristol, he became in 1834 an assistant to John Dixon, recently appointed chief engineer of the Liverpool and Manchester Railway. Woods was placed in charge of the section, 15 miles in length, between Liverpool and Newton-le-Willows, including Wapping Tunnel between the Cavendish cutting and Park Lane goods stations; and in 1836 he succeeded Dixon as chief engineer, taking also charge of the mechanical department. The Liverpool and Manchester railway was amalgamated with the Grand Junction Railway in 1845. Woods remained until the end of 1852 in charge of the works appertaining to the Liverpool and Manchester section, including the construction of the Victoria Tunnel (completed 1848) between Edge Hill station and the docks, a large goods station adjoining the West Waterloo Dock, and a line between Patricroft and Clifton, opened in 1850. In 1853 he established himself in London as a consulting engineer.

== Academic works ==
During his eighteen years' work on the Liverpool and Manchester line Woods took a prominent part in various early experimental investigations into the working of railways. In 1836 he made observations on the waste of fuel due to condensation in the long pipes conveying steam a quarter of a mile to the winding engines used for hauling trains through the Edge Hill tunnel, the gradient of which was then considered too steep for locomotives. He was a member of a committee appointed by the British Association in 1837 to report on the resistance of railway trains. In 1838 he presented to the Institution of Civil Engineers a paper 'On Certain Forms of Locomotive Engines,' which contains some of the earliest accurate details of the working of locomotives, and for which he was awarded a Telford Medal in silver. The consumption of fuel in locomotives was the subject of a paper presented by him to the Liverpool Polytechnic Society in 1843 (published in 1844), and of a contribution to a new edition of Thomas Tredgold's Steam Engine in 1850.

In 1853 Woods carried out, with W. P. Marshall, some experiments on the locomotives of the London and North Western Railway, between London and Rugby, and three joint reports were made to the general locomotive committee of the railway, recommending certain weights and dimensions for various classes of engines. These were followed, in 1854, by a joint report on the use of coal as a substitute for coke, which had been used hitherto.

== Work in South America ==
From 1854 onwards his practice was chiefly connected with the railways of South America, including the Central Argentine Railway, the Copiapó extension, Santiago and Valparaíso, and Coquimbo railways in Chile, and the Mollenda-Arequipa and Callao-La Oroya lines in Peru. He was responsible not only for surveys and construction, but also for the design of rolling stock to meet the somewhat special conditions. Other engineering work included a wrought-iron pier, 2400 feet long, built in 1851 on screw piles at Pisco on the coast of Peru, and a quay-wall built at Bilbao in 1877.

In the 'battle of the gauges' he favoured the Irish gauge (5 feet 3 inches) or the Indian gauge (5 feet 6 inches). He regarded break of gauge as a mistake.

== Professional institutions ==
In 1877, as president of the mechanical science section of the British Association, he delivered an address on 'Adequate Brake Power for Railway Trains.' Elected a member of the Institution of Civil Engineers on 7 April 1846, he became a member of its council in December 1869, and was president between November 1886 and November 1887. His presidential address contains much information as to the early history of railways. In 1884 he was president of the Smeatonian Society of Civil Engineers.

== Later life ==
He died at his residence, 45 Onslow Gardens, London, on 14 June 1903, and was buried at Chenies, Buckinghamshire. His portrait in oils, by Miss Porter, is in the possession of the Institution of Civil Engineers.

He married in 1840 Mary, daughter of Thomas Goodman of Birmingham, by whom he had three sons and two daughters. Among their descendants are a number of senior clergymen, including Theodore Woods (1874–1932), Bishop of Winchester, Edward Woods (1877–1953), Bishop of Lichfield, Frank Woods (1907–1992), Archbishop of Melbourne, and Robin Woods (1914–1997), Bishop of Worcester.

Professional and academic associations
Preceded by Frederick Bramwell	President of the Institution of Civil Engineers; May 1886 – June 1887	Succeeded by George Barclay Bruce
