= William Baker (priest) =

Anglican priest

The Venerable William Arthur Baker was an eminent Anglican priest in the 20th century.

Baker was born in 1870, educated at Christ's College, Cambridge, and ordained in 1895. He was Assistant Chaplain at King William's College in the Isle of Man and then Curate of St Mary, Ely. After this he held incumbencies at Hapton, Bourn and Handsworth. He was Archdeacon of Sheffield from 1938 to 1943. He died on 14 December 1950.

Church of England titles
Preceded by Alfred Charles Eustace Jarvis	Archdeacon of Sheffield; 1934–1938	Succeeded by Douglas Ernest William Harrison
