= Choo Choo Bar =

Candy bar

Choo Choo Bar Wrapper

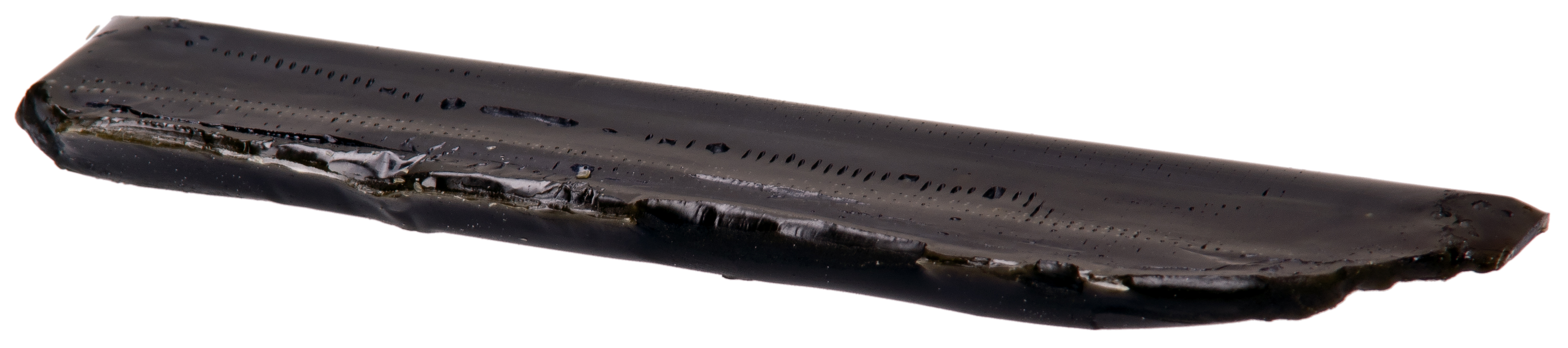
A Choo Choo Bar

A Choo Choo Bar is a brittle toffee liquorice-flavoured confectionery bar popular in Australia.

Available in a 20 g (0.71 oz) bar, packaged in a blue wrapper depicting an old steam train, ("The Choo Choo Funtime Express"), Choo Choo Bars were originally a Plaistowe product, acquired by Nestlé. They are now made by Lagoon.

There is also a raspberry-flavoured Choo Choo Bar.

== Cultural context ==
The Choo Choo Bar is considered iconic.

Choo Choo Bars are considered to be part of the Australian folklife. Academic work refers to Choo Choo Bars in this manner referring to prior Federal Governmental inquiry outcomes:

Over the years a number of commercial products have so impacted upon the Australian consciousness, developing their own mythology and lore, that it would be churlish to deny them status as part of Australia’s folklife. These include products such as Vegemite and Goanna Oil, and a spectrum of lollies — Minties, Jaffas, Choo Choo Bars. Each has its own place in the Australian ethos, and is widely cherished. The owners of these brand names hold in trust an important dimension of Australia’s heritage. (Committee of Inquiry into Folklife in Australia, 1987, p110)

They are considered to have an elevated status within Australian folklife, and are used when setting historical context.

Choo Choo Bars are used as a specific reference to make a point about Australian food, culture, or lifestyle.

== History ==
Plaistowe released the original Choo Choo Bar in Western Australia, in the mid 1950s. In the 1980s, Choo Choo Bars became unavailable. Lagoon Confectionery, a family business from Williamstown, bought the original Choo Choo Bar recipe and reissued it. In the 1960s, the wrapper featured a little red steam train, the Choo Choo Express, being driven by a golliwog. Lagoon replaced the golliwog with a monkey.

Choo Choo Bars are considered to be perennial favourites by particular generations of Australians. The Australian Broadcasting Corporation used Choo Choo Bars as one of several key nostalgic items to promote the television programme The Baby Boomers Picture Show.

== In literature ==
Choo Choo Bars are referred to in Australian literature, typically when profiling a character. For example:

- If so... this is the answer
- Pangea Volume One (Creative) Pangea and Almost Back
- The Tin Moon
