= Charles Eyre (cricketer) =

English cricketer and British Army officer

Personal information
- Full name: Charles Howard Eyre
- Born: 26 March 1883; Toxteth, Liverpool Lancashire, England
- Died: 25 September 1915 (aged 32); Loos-en-Gohelle, Pas-de-Calais, France
- Batting: Right-handed
- Bowling: Unknown

Domestic team information
- Years: Team
- 1903–1906: Cambridge University
- 1905: Marylebone Cricket Club

Career statistics
Competition	First-class
Matches	30
Runs scored	1,092
Batting average	21.42
100s/50s	1/4
Top score	153
Balls bowled	66
Wickets	2
Bowling average	25.00
5 wickets in innings	–
10 wickets in match	–
Best bowling	1/9
Catches/stumpings	40/–
- Source: Cricinfo, 5 October 2020

Charles Howard Eyre (26 March 1883 – 25 September 1915) was an English first-class cricketer, educator and British Army officer.

The son of John Eyre, the Archdeacon of Sheffield, he was born in Toxteth, Liverpool in March 1883. He was educated at Harrow School, where he was a multi-talented sportsman who played cricket, football, Eton Fives and rackets. He was also head of school in 1901. From Harrow, he went up as a scholar to Pembroke College, Cambridge. While studying at Cambridge, he played first-class cricket for Cambridge University from 1903 to 1906, making 29 appearances. He scored 1,092 runs for Cambridge, averaging 21.84 with one century and four half centuries. His century, a score of 153, came against Yorkshire in 1906. He was a good fielder, taking 40 catches in first-class cricket. He played for the Marylebone Cricket Club in 1905 during their tour of North America, with Eyre making a single first-class appearance on the tour against the Gentlemen of Philadelphia at Germantown.

After graduating from Cambridge, Eyre returned to Harrow to become an assistant master and also served as honorary secretary of the Harrow Association. Shortly after the outbreak of the First World War in July 1914, he was commissioned into the King's Royal Rifle Corps as a second lieutenant. By July 1915, he held the rank of lieutenant and had been made a temporary captain. Eyre was killed in action on 25 September 1915, on the first day of the Battle of Loos.
