= Reynolds Stone =

British artist (1909–1979)

Alan Reynolds Stone, CBE, RDI (13 March 1909 – 23 June 1979) was an English wood engraver, engraver, designer, typographer and painter.

== Biography ==
Stone was born on 13 March 1909 at Eton College, where both his grandfather, E. D. Stone, and father, E. W. Stone, were assistant masters. He was educated there and at Magdalene College, Cambridge, where he obtained a degree in history in 1930.

He had no clear idea of his future, and, at the suggestion of Francis Scott, a young don at Magdalene, almost drifted into a two-year apprenticeship at the Cambridge University Press, where he came under the influence of Walter Lewis and, more importantly, F. G. Nobbs, the overseer of the composing department. Nobbs, to quote Stone, 'whisked me out of the hand-composing room into his office' where he taught him to appreciate letter design. A chance encounter with Eric Gill on the London to Cambridge train led to Stone spending a fortnight with Gill at Piggotts in Speen, Buckinghamshire engraving an alphabet on wood.

In 1932 he moved to Taunton, where he spent two years working at the printing firm of Barnicott & Pearce, a very different experience from his time in Cambridge. His experience of printing convinced him that this was not what he wanted to do for rest of his life. At Taunton he came across some old wood blocks which Barnicott gave him, and, in a bookshop at Combwich, he started to buy the wood engraved books of the 1850s and 1860s. He had already come across the wood engravings of Thomas Bewick at Cambridge, and, in 1934, 'sacked himself' and became a freelance wood engraver, moving to Codicote near Hitchin.

He married the photographer Janet Woods in 1938. They had four children – the painter Edward Stone (1940), the designer Humphrey Stone (1942), the illustrator Phillida Gili, and Emma Beck, wife of artist Ian Beck. His wife had a 30 year long relationship with Kenneth Clark.

The family were friends of the poet Cecil Day-Lewis and his family. In 2017 his son, the actor Daniel Day-Lewis named his character in Phantom Thread "Reynolds Woodcock", as a reference to him, and his typeface designs were used for the titles of the film.

He was elected a member of the Society of Wood Engravers in 1948. In 1953 he was appointed a CBE and moved to the Old Rectory in Litton Cheney near Dorchester, where he lived until his death.

== Commercial work ==
Stone's output was considerable. Nearly all of his contemporaries would have seen his work, although few knew his name. A common sight in most high streets was the logo that he designed for Dolcis and which featured on the frontage of all their shoe shops.

In 1949 he redesigned the famous clock logo of The Times.

He engraved the Royal Arms for Queen Elizabeth II's coronation in 1953 and the official coat of arms for Her Majesty's Stationery Office in 1955, still reproduced today on the cover of the UK passport.

He also designed the coat of arms for the British Council.

He designed a number of Royal Mail postage stamps, starting with the 1946 Victory stamp.

He designed the £5 and £10 bank notes respectively in 1963 and 1964 – including the Queen's portrait – for the Bank of England.

Stone is perhaps best known for his lettering. Stanley Morison, the typographer, valued him above all for this ability and said to him: "anyone can draw trees". Stone's lettering was hugely admired and he worked in many media.

In 1939 Stone started to teach himself to cut letters in stone. His expertise in lettering led to a number of prestigious commissions for memorials.

In 1952 he carved the tablet in the Grand Entrance of the Victoria and Albert Museum memorializing employees of the museum who died in World War II. This memorial complements the Eric Gill memorial to employees who died in World War I. In 1965 he carved the memorial to Winston Churchill and the 25th anniversary of the Battle of Britain in Westminster Abbey. In 1966 he carved the memorial for T. S. Eliot in the abbey. One of his last works, in 1977, was the gravestone of composer Benjamin Britten.

In 1954 he designed the Minerva typeface for Linotype, intended to complement Gill's Pilgrim in display sizes. He also designed a proprietary typeface named after his wife, Janet.

In 1956 Stone was elected as a Royal Designer for Industry for his work in Lettering.

== Wood engravings and book illustrations ==
Stone was a self-taught wood engraver, which makes his achievements more remarkable. He had little difficulty moving from the graver and tools of the wood engraver to the chisel and mallet of the stone carver. Most of the commissions discussed above were wood engravings, as was most of his work.

His bookplates are distinguished particularly by the flowing elegance of the lettering. He produced over 350, for example for Hugh Trevor-Roper, depicting his home Chiefswood, and for John Sparrow, a nice example of his skill with letters. He had a very good eye for coats of arms, as shown by commissions from the Royal Family and the British Government as well as private individuals.

His work stood out from that of other wood engravers, who illustrated more books than Stone. Many of his commissions were for single engravings, even for books. It was a mark of distinction to have a Stone engraving on the title page or colophon.

He did, however, illustrate a number of books treasured by collectors.

In 1935 he produced 42 headpieces for The Shakespeare Anthology for the Nonesuch Press and, in the same year, 12 wood engravings for A Butler's Recipe Book 1719 for the Cambridge University Press. For the Gregynog Press he illustrated The History of Saint Louis (1937) and The Praise and Happinesse of the Countrie-Life (1938), the latter being particularly successful. In the same year he illustrated Old English Wines and Cordials for the High House Press. He illustrated Lucretia Borgia for the Golden Cockerel Press in 1942.

One of his most successful editions for a commercial publisher was an anthology compiled by Adrian Bell, The Open Air (1949).

Sylvia Townsend Warner wrote poems to complement a series of wood engravings that Stone had already completed. The result was Boxwood (1957), a limited edition of 500 copies, an extended new edition of which was published in 1960. Stone continued with A Sociable Plover by Eric Linklater (1957) and The Skylark and other poems by Ralph Hodgson (1958).

For the Limited Editions Club he illustrated Herman Melville's Omoo in 1961. He also illustrated Saint Thomas Aquinas (1969) and The Poems of Alfred, Lord Tennyson (1974) for the club.

In 1968 the Chilmark Press published an edition of The Mountains, a volume of poetry and prose by R. S. Thomas to complement a series of wood engravings made by Stone after John Piper in 1946.

Stone illustrated a number of books and portfolios for Warren Editions. The first was The Other Side of the Alde (1968), the first use of his Janet typeface. This was followed by ABC, an Alphabet (1974), The Old Rectory (1976) and a posthumous new edition of Boxwood (1983).

For the Compton Press he illustrated A Shepherd's Life by W. H. Hudson (1977) and A Year of Birds by Iris Murdoch (1978).

His last engraving was the only one he managed to complete of a series to illustrate a republication of Sacheverell Sitwell's book Valse Des Fleurs, published in a limited edition of 400 copies in 1980. It appears on the title page of the book, and a tailpiece woodcut is published at the end.

== An overview of his life and work ==
There was a retrospective exhibition of his work at the Dorset County Museum in 1981, followed by a major exhibition of his work in the library of the Victoria and Albert Museum between July and October 1982. Another, to honour the centenary of his birth, was held at The Red House, Aldeburgh, in April 2009.

His skills were widely recognised and much in demand. Much of his work was for official bodies, so much so that Hans Schmoller wrote of him in his obituary: ... "he might almost be described as the 'Engraver Royal'".

His wood engravings showed a clarity of vision and an intensity that his preparatory sketches lacked. His wood engraved illustrations are distinguished by a formality and sureness of cutting, and his bookplates and coats of arms by a clarity and simplicity within the flourishes.

Stone said of his work: "One bold flourish is usually better than a larger number of small twiddles, which are not worth doing anyway. But the final danger is to do too much because the eye, delighted by a small mouthful, is soon surfeited."

== Collections ==
There have been two collections of Stone's wood engravings, the first by Myfanwy Piper, the second, more definitive, with an introduction by Kenneth Clark. Michael Harvey has written about his wood engraved lettering.

The catalogue of the Victoria and Albert Museum exhibition reprints the Goodison text and two pieces by Stone, and gives a comprehensive list of the whole range of Stone's work. David Chambers has produced a checklist of his bookplates, and Jeremy Malin has produced a very full checklist of his published works.

There is an official website dedicated to Stone.

See also:

- Alan Powers, 'Reynolds Stone - A centenary tribute' and Humphrey Stone, 'Reynolds Stone: lettering', both in Parenthesis; 16 (2009 February), p. 6–8 and 9–10.
