= Michael Gresford Jones =

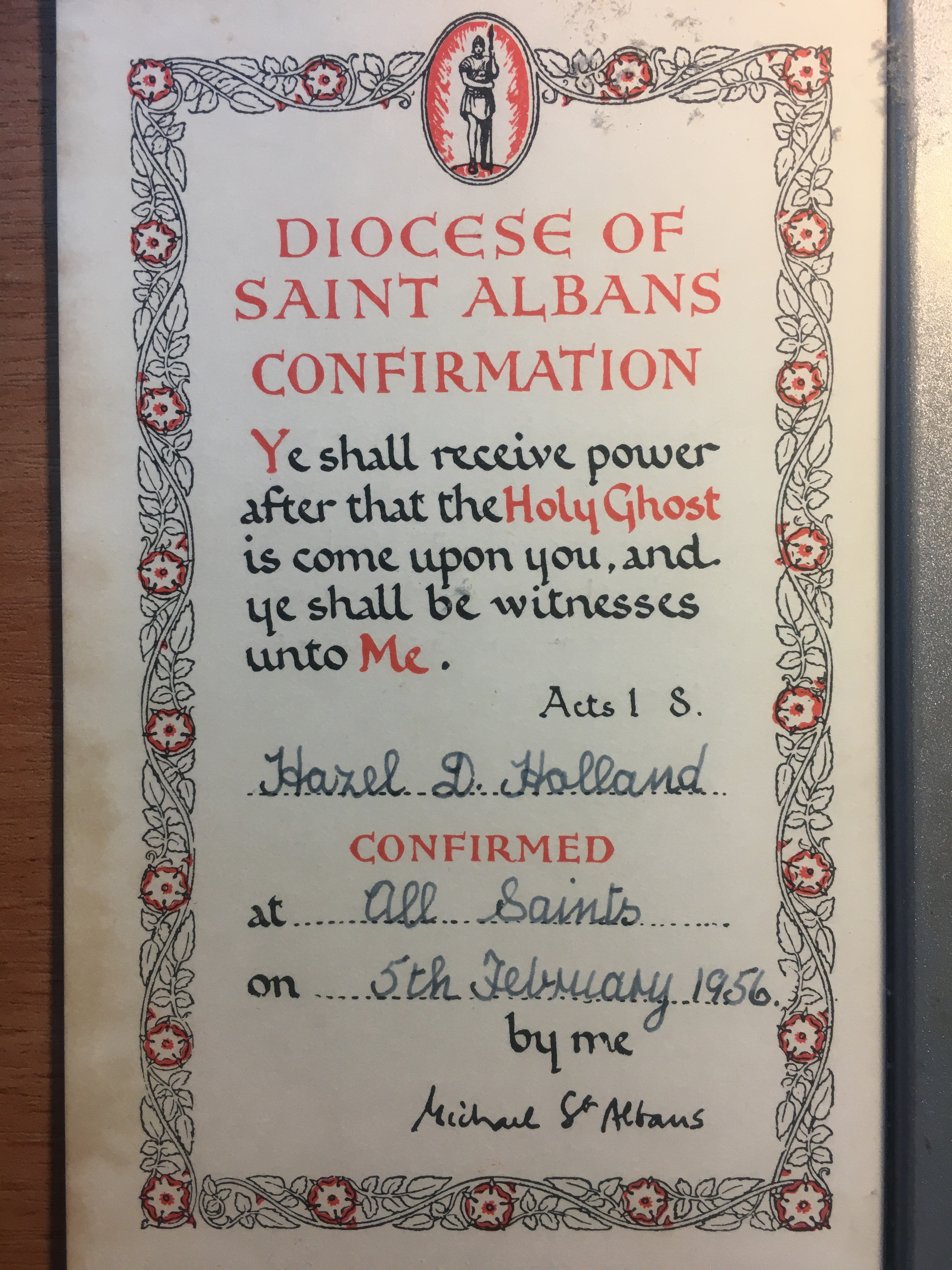
Confirmation certificate signed by Michael St Albans

Edward Michael Gresford Jones KCVO (called Michael; 21 October 1901 – 7 March 1982) was a Church of England bishop. He was the son of Herbert Gresford Jones who was also a bishop.

He was educated at Rugby School and Trinity College, Cambridge and ordained in 1927, his first post being as a Curate at St Chrysostom's, Victoria Park, Manchester. He was Chaplain at his old college and after this held incumbencies at Fylde and Hunslet. From 1942 to 1950 he was Bishop of Willesden and Rector of St Botolph-without-Bishopsgate — he was consecrated a bishop on Lady Day (25 March) at St Paul's Cathedral, though he remained at Leeds until he was instituted to St Botolph's on 30 April. He was translated to St Albans. From 1953 until 1970, he served as Lord High Almoner.

Gresford Jones was enthroned as the 6th Bishop of St Albans on 28 September 1950, where he remained in office until 1970. Renowned for his administrative skills rather than his oratory. His maiden speech was in connection with the 1967 Sexual Offences Act, which decriminalised homosexuality, and he subsequently spoke on a variety of issues including, space research, dog licences and Chemical and Biological Warfare.

In retirement he continued to serve the church as an Assistant Bishop within the Diocese of Monmouth until 1978.

Religious titles
Preceded by Henry Montgomery Campbell	Bishop of Willesden; 1942–1950	Succeeded by Gerald Ellison
Preceded by Philip Loyd	Bishop of St Albans; 1950–1970	Succeeded by Robert Runcie
Court offices
Preceded by Edward Woods	Lord High Almoner; 1953–1970	Succeeded by David Say
