= Phillida Gili =

British children's book illustrator

- Occupation: Children's book illustrator
- Known for: Illustrator of 'The Nutcracker and the Mouse King'

Phillida Gili is a British children's book illustrator. One of her best-known works is a 1992 pop-up version of The Nutcracker.

== Biography ==
Phillida Gili is the daughter of Reynolds Stone and Janet Woods. He was a wood engraver, engraver, designer, typographer and painter; she was a singer and photographer. Gili won a prize from The Young Elizabethan magazine as a child for drawing a human foot from the perspective of an ant. In 1963 her image was used by her father to represent a 'child Britannia' on the reverse of the British £5 note. The notes were legal tender from 21 February 1963 until 31 August 1973. The chief cashier at that time was Jasper Hollom. She studied at the St Martin's School of Art, telling UK daily newspaper The Guardian in March 2015 that Fritz Wegner, a visiting lecturer at St Martin's, "gave me the first words of encouragement I ever received at art school".

She was married to filmmaker Jonathan Gili, with whom she had three children. She lives in London.

== Work ==
Gili's work includes illustrating and sometimes writing children's books. Some of her works are Sir John Betjeman's Archie and the Strict Baptists, The Nutcracker, Sleeping Beauty, picture books by Nina Bawden and Jenny Nimmo, a pop-up version of Cinderella, and The Lost Ears. She has also illustrated "for calendars, cards and stationery by Laura Ashley, [for] the National Trust, and for advertising".
