= Alfred Jarvis =

Anglican priest and chaplain (1876–1957)

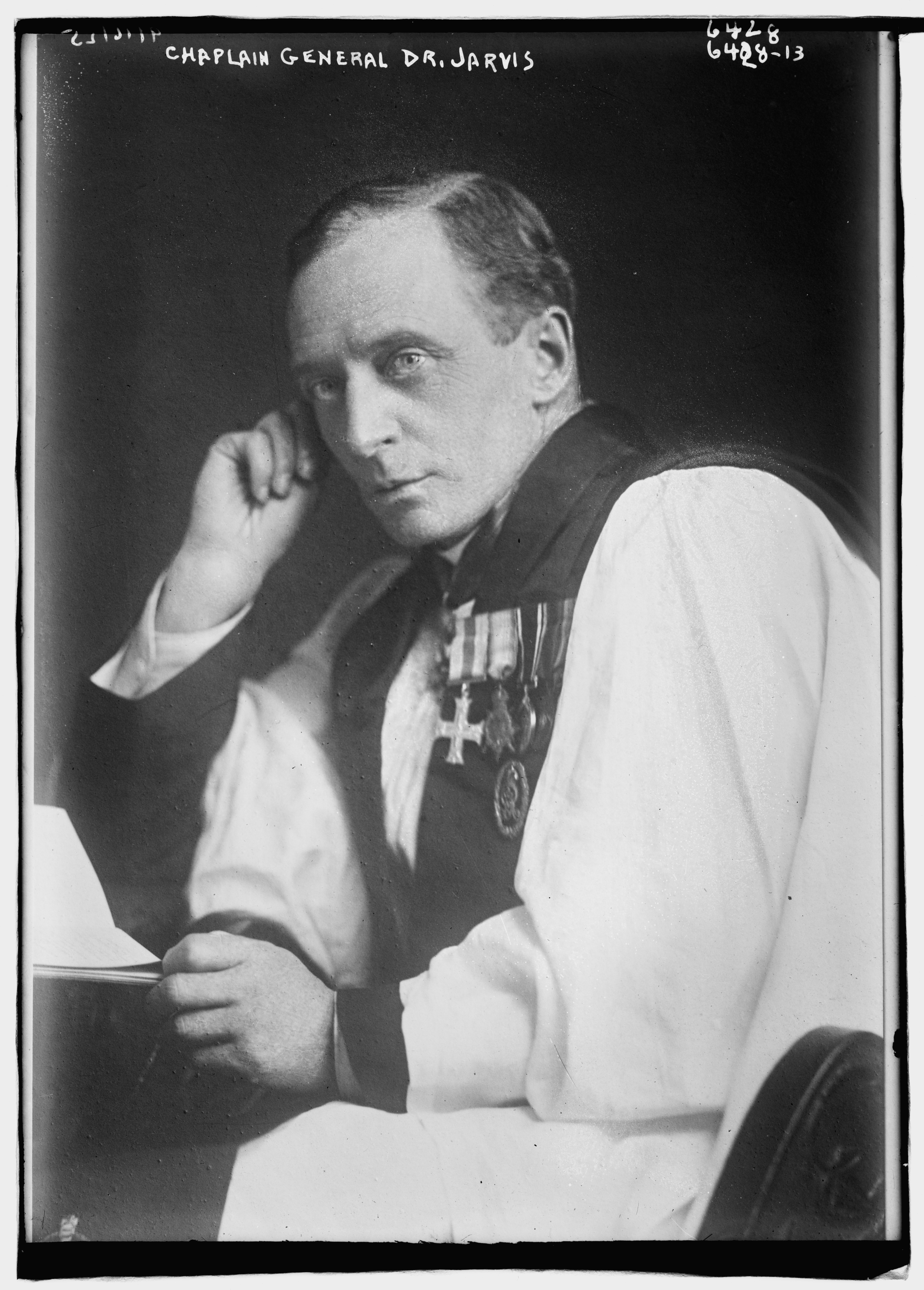

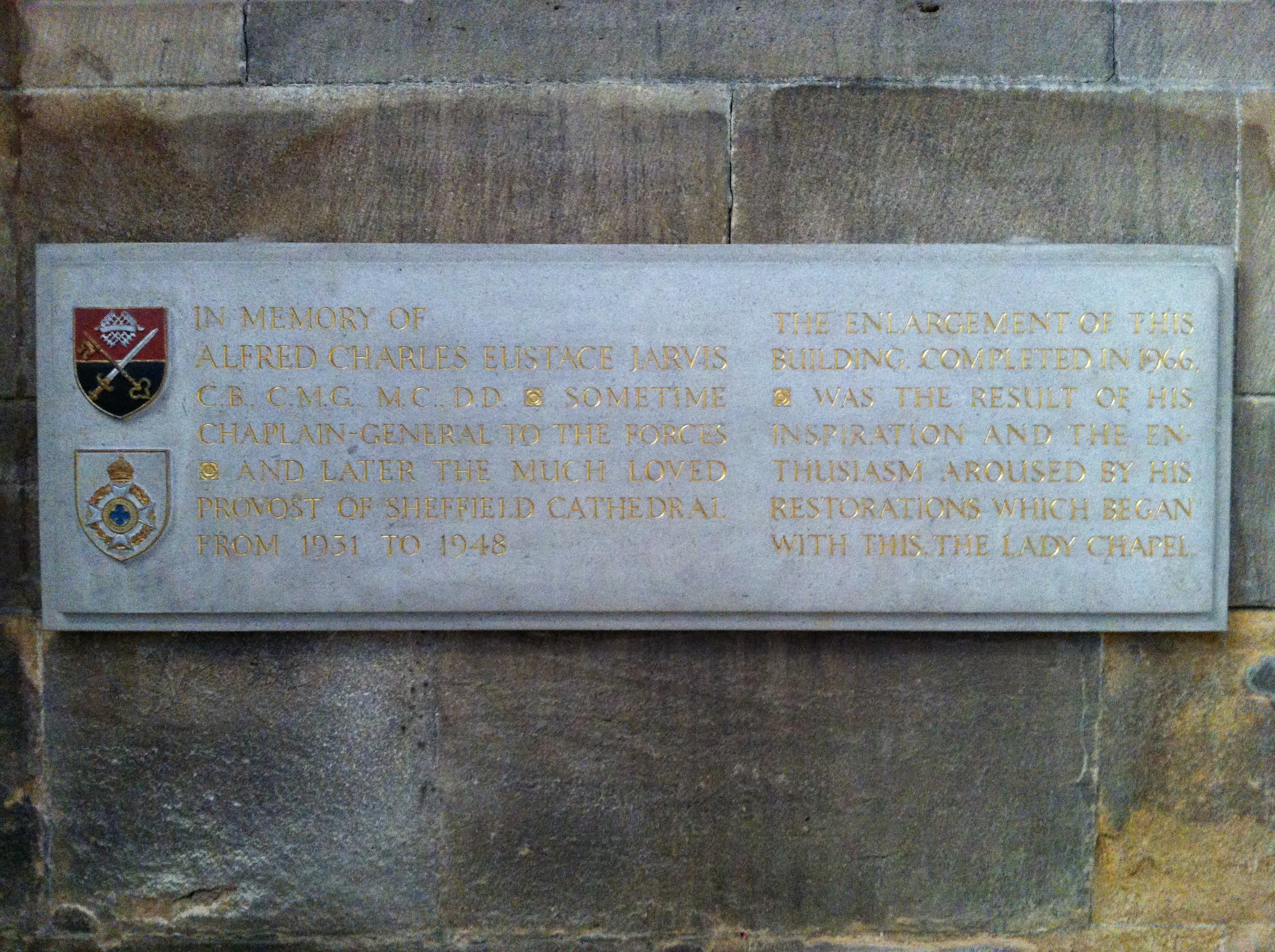
Memorial in Sheffield Cathedral

Alfred Charles Eustace Jarvis KCB CMG MC (14 November 1876 – 26 March 1957) was an eminent Anglican priest in the 20th century.

== Early life, family and education ==
He was born in Bournemouth in 1876. His parentage is unclear. In 1915, in Gallipoli, he told the Bishop of Fukien that he was the son of Dr. Birdwood, brother of Lt-General William Birdwood, GOC Australian and NZ Army Corps, and that Dr. Birdwood’s second wife had refused to accept him, so he had been adopted. He began work as an apprentice in a furniture store and served as a soldier in the Boer War. He studied at Handsworth Theological College

== Career ==
Jarvis was a Methodist minister from 1901 to 1908 when he was ordained into the Church of England. He was initially a Curate at All Saints, South Lambeth.

In 1909, he joined the Army Chaplain’s Department. His promotion in the Great War was rapid. In 1915, he was Principal Chaplain Mediterranean Expeditionary Force and from 1917 to 1919 Principal Chaplain Mesopotamia. In these four years, he won the Military Cross, was 3 times Mentioned in Despatches, was awarded the Serbian Order of the White Eagle and appointed a Companion of the Order of St Michael and St George (CMG). He had served in Gallipoli, Salonika and Egypt as well as in the campaign leading to the capture of Baghdad. One of Jarvis’s strengths was his administrative ability. In Egypt and in Mesopotamia he had prepared Reports reorganising the Chaplain its as new camps and outposts appeared. After the war he was Assistant Chaplain-General, Northern Command from 1920 to 1925 and Chaplain-General to the Forces until 1931; and also Chaplain of the Tower of London from 1927. He was Provost and Vicar of Sheffield from 1931 to 1948; and also Archdeacon of Sheffield for two spells (1931 to 1933, and 1934 to 1938) and Rural Dean for one (1939–1942).

He was an Honorary Chaplain to two Kings and a Chaplain of the Order of St John of Jerusalem.

Jarvis was appointed a Companion of the Order of the Bath in the 1928 Birthday Honours

== Demise ==
Jarvis died on 26 March 1957. There is a memorial plaque in Sheffield Cathedral.

Church of England titles
Preceded by John Taylor Smith	Chaplain-General to the Forces; 1922–1931	Succeeded by Ernest Hayford Thorold
Preceded by John Russell Darbyshire	Archdeacon of Sheffield; 1931–1933	Succeeded by Alexander John Doull
Preceded by Inaugural appointment	Provost of Sheffield; 1931–1948	Succeeded by John Howard Cruse
Preceded by Alexander John Doull	Archdeacon of Sheffield; 1934–1938	Succeeded by William Arthur Baker
