= Edwin Kempson =

British Anglican bishop (1862–1931)

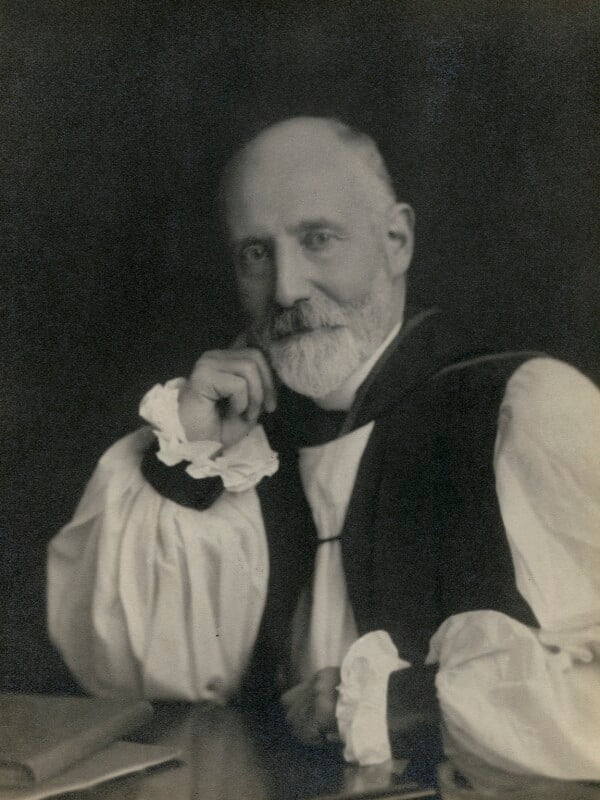
Kempson, c. 1910s–20s

Edwin Hone Kempson (1862–1931) was the second Suffragan Bishop of Warrington. Born on 16 April 1862 and educated at Rugby and Christ Church, Oxford, he was ordained in 1886 and began a career in education. He was successively an assistant master at Clifton College, a Housemaster at Harrow and finally Principal of King William's College, Isle of Man. From 1912 until 1920 he was Canon Residentiary of Newcastle Cathedral before ascending to the Episcopate in 1920, a post he held for seven years.

One of his sons was Edwin Kempson who was a member of both the 1935 British Mount Everest reconnaissance expedition and the 1936 British Mount Everest expedition.

== Notes ==
Church of England titles
Preceded by Martin Linton Smith	Bishop of Warrington; 1920 – 1927	Succeeded by Herbert Gresford Jones
