= Henry Favell =

Henry Arnold Favell (1845–1896) was an Anglican priest in the 19th century.

Born in Sheffield, he was baptised 3 January 1845 and educated at Sheffield Collegiate School and Gonville and Caius College, Cambridge. Ordained in 1867, he spent 6 years as a Curate in Birmingham before becoming Vicar of St George's, Sheffield. 10 years later, he became the incumbent at St Mark's in the same city. He became Archdeacon of Sheffield in 1895 but died a year later.

Church of England titles
Preceded by John Edward Blakeney	Archdeacon of Sheffield; 1895–1896	Succeeded by John Rashdall Eyre
