= David Jennings (bishop) =

The Right Reverend David Jennings
- Bishop of Warrington
- Diocese: Diocese of Liverpool
- In office: 2000–2009
- Predecessor: John Packer
- Successor: Richard Blackburn
- Other posts: Honorary assistant bishop in Gloucester (2010–present); Archdeacon of Southend (1992–2000)

Orders
- Ordination: 1967 (deacon); 1968 (priest)
- Consecration: 2000

Personal details
- Born: 13 July 1944 (age 82)
- Denomination: Anglican
- Parents: Willfred & Nona de Winton
- Spouse: Sarah Fynn (m. 1969)
- Children: 3 sons
- Education: King's College London

David Willfred Michael Jennings AKC (born 13 July 1944) was the Anglican Bishop of Warrington from 2000 until he resigned with effect from 31 October 2009.

== Education ==
Jennings was educated at Summer Fields School before moving on to Radley College and trained for the priesthood at King's College London before embarking on a curacy at Walton-on-the-Hill, Liverpool.

== Career ==
Jennings was made a deacon at Trinity 1967 (21 May) by Laurie Brown, Bishop of Warrington, at St Nicholas, Blundellsands and ordained a priest at Michaelmas 1968 (29 September) by Stuart Blanch, Bishop of Liverpool, at Liverpool Cathedral.

After a further curacy at Christchurch Priory he became an incumbent at Hythe in 1969. Further pastoral posts led to appointments as the Vicar of St Edwards, Romford and Head of the Board of Governors of the associated St Edwards CofE Comprehensive and St Edwards Junior School, both in Romford. He later became Rural Dean of Havering in 1985 whilst still based primarily at St Edwards and as Archdeacon of Southend in 1992. He was ordained to the episcopate in 2000. An inspirational preacher, he is also a member of the Court of Liverpool University.
