= Hayman Johnson =

British Anglican chaplain

The Venerable Hayman Johnson (29 June 1912 – 1 April 1993) was an eminent Anglican priest in the 20th century.

He was educated at Exeter School and New College, Oxford and ordained in 1937. After curacies in Bermondsey and Streatham he was a Chaplain in the RAFVR from 1941 to 1946. He held incumbencies at Harold Wood and Hornchurch before becoming Archdeacon of Sheffield in 1963. An Honorary Chaplain to the Queen, he retired in 1978.

Church of England titles
Preceded by Robert Wilmer Woods	Archdeacon of Sheffield; 1963–1978	Succeeded by Michael John Macdonald Paton
