= Janet Stone =

English photographer and hostess

- in 1977
- Born: Janet Clemence Woods; 1 December 1912; Cromer, England
- Died: 30 January 1998 (aged 85); Salisbury, England
- Education: Royal College of Music
- Known for: photographer and hostess
- Spouse: Reynolds Stone
- Partner: Kenneth Clark
- Children: four

Janet Clemence Stone (née Woods; 1 December 1912 – 30 January 1998) was an English photographer and hostess. She had a 30-year relationship with Kenneth Clark and she expected to be his second wife. Her photos are in the National Portrait Gallery.

== Life ==
Stone was born in Cromer in 1912. Her parents were Clemence Rachel (born Barclay) and Edward Sydney Woods and she was the fourth of their sixth children. Her father was the Bishop of Croydon and later the Bishop of Lichfield and three of her brothers followed her father into the clergy. Samuel Woods was an archdeacon in New Zealand, Frank Woods was the Archbishop of Melbourne, and Robin Woods was the Bishop of Worcester. She had a singing career available after she studied at the Royal College of Music. She married the engraver Reynolds Stone in 1938.

They lived at the 18th century Old Rectory in Litton Cheney from 1953 and she became a well known hostess during their 26 years together in Dorset. They were good friends with the writers Iris Murdoch and her husband John Bayley, and their guests included the poet laureate John Betjeman, J. B. Priestley, the composer Benjamin Britten, the writer and broadcaster Kenneth Clark and the sculptor Henry Moore.

At the suggestion of her friend Iris Murdoch, she published, "Thinking Faces", a collection of her photographs.

== Private life ==
She and her husband had four children – the painter Edward Stone (1940), the designer Humphrey Stone (1942), the illustrator Phillida Gili, and Emma Beck, wife of artist Ian Beck. She had a thirty year affair with Kenneth Clark and he did not treat her well. She expected him to marry her after his wife died but he married another. After Clark died in 1983 a box was found of letters written by Woods. They were unopened.

== Death and legacy ==
Stone died in Salisbury in 1998. She gave a large collection of her photos to the National Portrait Gallery. The portraits include Francis Cornforth from the 1950s, the guitarist Julian Bream, the composer Benjamin Britten and comic writer Joyce Grenfell.

In 2018 the Bodleian Libraries published "Through The Lens of Janet Stone" recording her portraits over 26 years.
