= Bev Mason =

Anglican bishop in England

The Right Reverend Bev Mason
- Bishop of Warrington
- Church: Church of England
- Diocese: Diocese of Liverpool
- In office: 2018 to 2025
- Predecessor: Richard Blackburn
- Successor: TBA
- Other post: Archdeacon of Richmond and Craven (2016–2018)

Orders
- Ordination: 2001 (deacon); 2003 (priest)
- Consecration: 18 October 2018 by John Sentamu

Personal details
- Born: Beverley Anne Mason; August 1960 (age 66)
- Denomination: Anglicanism
- Education: Trinity College, Bristol

Beverley Anne Mason (called Bev; born August 1960) is a British Anglican bishop who served as Bishop of Warrington, a suffragan bishop in the Diocese of Liverpool, from 2018 until 2025. After parish ministry in the Dioceses of Rochester, Southwark and Bradford, her final post before becoming a bishop was as the Archdeacon of Richmond and Craven in the Diocese of Leeds from 2016 to 2018.

== Early life and education ==
Mason was born in August 1960, in Germany. She trained for ordained ministry at Trinity College, Bristol, an evangelical Anglican theological college. During this time, she also studied theology and graduated with a Bachelor of Arts (BA) degree in 2000. After a further year of training, she left theological college to be ordained.

== Ordained ministry ==
Mason was ordained in the Church of England as a deacon in 2001 and as a priest in 2003. She served curacies at St Paul's Church, Rusthall (2001 to 2002) and St Margaret's Church, Rainham (2002 to 2005) in the Diocese of Rochester. She was then Vicar of the Church of St John the Evangelist, Upper Norwood in the Diocese of Southwark from 2005 to 2012. She was additionally Area Dean of Croydon North between 2010 and 2012.

In 2012, Mason moved to Yorkshire, having been appointed Priest-in-Charge of Church of All Saints, Bingley in the Diocese of Bradford. She was made Vicar of All Saints a year later. She was announced as the next Archdeacon of Richmond and Craven of the Diocese of Leeds in September 2015, and left All Saints at the end of 2015. She took up the appointment of archdeacon in 2016.

=== Episcopal ministry ===
On 24 July 2018, Mason was announced as the next Bishop of Warrington, a suffragan bishop in the Diocese of Liverpool. She was consecrated as a bishop at York Minster by John Sentamu, Archbishop of York, on 18 October 2018. She was officially welcomed into the diocese during a service at Liverpool Cathedral on 17 November 2018. In the vacancy following Paul Bayes' retirement, Mason became acting diocesan Bishop of Liverpool.

In April 2024, it was stated that she was away from the diocese and not carrying out any engagements, for reasons not thought related to her health. In January 2025, it was made public that John Perumbalath, Bishop of Liverpool, had been accused by one woman of sexual assault and by a female bishop of sexual harassment, and he retired. Mason then stated in a pastoral letter to the Diocese of Liverpool that she was the female bishop in question.

In April 2025, while still on leave from the Diocese of Liverpool, Mason was appointed an honorary assistant bishop of the Diocese of St Asaph, part of the Church in Wales. In a statement on the Diocese of Liverpool's website she remarked: "I look forward with hope to a restored and renewed ministry in the Province of the Church in Wales. [...] I remain Bishop of Warrington as I continue to wait and push for a proper resolution to my unhappy situation. Today [4 April 2025], it is 574 days since I exercised an episcopal ministry.". In September 2025 it was announced that she would resign from being bishop of Warrington; she duly resigned her See effective 1 October 2025.
