= Archdeacon of Sheffield and Rotherham =

Church of England ecclesiastical office

The Archdeacon of Sheffield and Rotherham is a senior ecclesiastical officer within the Diocese of Sheffield (Church of England), responsible for the disciplinary supervision of the clergy within the six area deaneries.

== History ==
On 18 April 1884 the Archdeaconry of Sheffield, consisting of the rural Deaneries of Sheffield, Handsworth, Ecclesford, Rotherham and Wath, was created within the Diocese of York from part of the York archdeaconry. In 1913 the deanery of Wath was split off to form part of the new Archdeaconry of Doncaster.

In 1914 the Archdeaconries of Sheffield and Doncaster were split off from the Diocese of York to create the new Diocese of Sheffield. In 1942 the deaneries of Sheffield and Handsworth were abolished and replaced by the deaneries of Attercliffe, Ecclesall, Hallam, Laughton and Tankersley. The current (2014) six deaneries comprise Attercliffe, Ecclesall, Ecclesfield, Hallam, Laughton and Rotherham.

== List of archdeacons ==
Blakeney was the first archdeacon after the archdeaconry was created in 1884.

- 1884 – 12 January 1895 (d.): John Blakeney, Vicar of Sheffield (Parish Church)
- 1895 – 21 September 1896 (d.): Henry Favell, Vicar of St Mark's
- 1897 – 12 June 1912 (d.): John Eyre, Vicar of Sheffield (Parish Church)
- 1912 – 1920 (res.): Herbert Gresford Jones, Vicar of Sheffield (Parish Church/Cathedral; became Bishop in Kampala)

In 1914, the new Sheffield diocese was created from Sheffield and Doncaster archdeaconries.

- 1920 – 1922 (res.): Charles Lisle Carr, Vicar of Sheffield (Cathedral; became Bishop of Coventry)
- 1922 – 1931 (res.): Russell Darbyshire, Vicar of Sheffield (Cathedral; became Bishop of Glasgow and Galloway then Archbishop of Cape Town)
- 1931 – 1933 (res.): Alfred Jarvis, Provost of Sheffield (Vicar of the Cathedral)
- 1933 – 1934 (ret.): Alexander Doull, assistant bishop, Vicar of Brodsworth
- 1934 – 1938 (ret.): Alfred Jarvis, Provost of Sheffield (Vicar of the Cathedral; again)
- 1938 – 1943 (ret.): William Baker, Rector of Handsworth (afterwards archdeacon emeritus)
- 1943 – 1957 (res.): Douglas Harrison, Bishop's Examining Chaplain, Canon Residentiary and Director of Ordinands (became Dean of Bristol)
- 1958 – 1962 (res.): Robin Woods, Rector of Tankersley (became Dean of Windsor)
- 1963 – 1978 (ret.): Hayman Johnson, Bishop's Examining Chaplain (afterwards archdeacon emeritus)
- 1978 – 1987 (ret.): Michael Paton (afterwards archdeacon emeritus)
- 1988 – 1999 (res.): Stephen Lowe (became Bishop suffragan of Hulme)

In 1999, the name of the archdeaconry was changed to Sheffield and Rotherham.

- 1999 – 2009 (res.): Richard Blackburn (became Bishop suffragan of Warrington)
- 2010 – 2013 (res.): Martyn Snow (became Bishop suffragan of Tewkesbury)
- 19 January 2014 – 11 June 2025 (res.): Malcolm Chamberlain (became Bishop of Wakefield)
- "November" 2025 (announced): David Gerrard (archdeacon-designate)
