= Ronald Plaistowe =

Ronald Percy Frank Plaistowe was archdeacon of Timaru from 1953 until 1963; archdeacon of Sumner from 1963 until 1969; and archdeacon of Christchurch from 1968 to 1971.

He was educated at St John's College, Durham and ordained in 1937. After curacies in Bristol he was perpetual curate of Cleeve. Moving to New Zealand he was vicar of St Peter, Palmerston North before his years as an archdeacon.
