= Herbert Gresford Jones =

British Anglican bishop (1870–1958)

- Bishop of Warrington
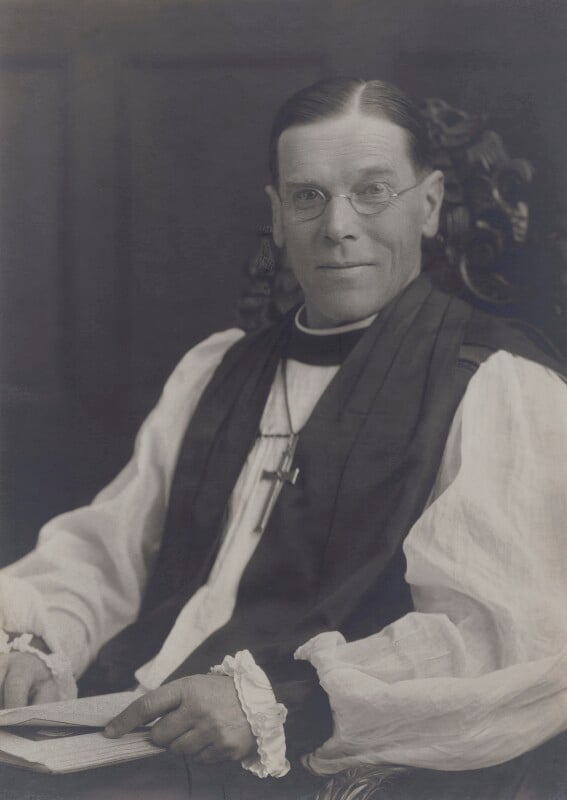
- Gresford Jones in the 1920s
- Diocese: Diocese of Liverpool
- In office: 1927–1945
- Predecessor: Edwin Kempson
- Successor: Charles Claxton
- Other posts: Archdeacon of Sheffield (1913–1920); Bishop of Kampala (1920–1923); Canon of Liverpool (1935–1956)

Orders
- Ordination: 1894 (deacon); 1895 (priest) by J. C. Ryle (both)
- Consecration: 24 June 1920 by Randall Davidson

Personal details
- Born: 7 April 1870 Burneside, Cumbria, England
- Died: 22 June 1958 (aged 88) Liverpool, Lancashire, England
- Denomination: Anglican
- Education: Haileybury; Trinity College, Cambridge

Herbert Gresford Jones (7 April 1870 – 22 June 1958) was an Anglican bishop who served as Bishop of Kampala (suffragan bishop of the Diocese of Uganda) and the Bishop of Warrington, the suffragan bishop of the Church of England's Diocese of Liverpool.

== Family and education ==
Son of William Jones (sometime Vicar of Burneside and canon) and of Margaret, Herbert was born on 7 April 1870 at their home (Burneside parsonage). He was educated at Haileybury and Trinity College, Cambridge, where he was admitted a pensioner on 27 May 1889, matriculated that Michaelmas, graduated Bachelor of Arts (BA) in 1892, and proceeded Master of Arts (Cambridge) (MA Cantab) in 1896. In 1900, he married Elizabeth Howard Fox Hodgkin (called Lily), daughter of Thomas Hodgkin of Barmoor Castle; they had one son — Michael Gresford Jones, who later became Bishop of St Albans.

== Priestly ministry ==
He trained for the ministry at Wycliffe Hall, Oxford and was ordained in 1894: he was made deacon at Petertide 1894 (24 June) and ordained priest the next Petertide (9 June 1895) — both times by J. C. Ryle, Bishop of Liverpool, at Liverpool Cathedral. He began his career with a curacy at St Helen's Parish Church, Lancashire, before Incumbencies at St Michael-in-the-Hamlet, Liverpool (1896–1904); and St John's, Keswick, Cumbria (1904–1906). His appointment to St Michael's after only two years of curacy was remarkable enough to elicit comment in the national church press, and a defence by his bishop. While at Keswick, Gresford Jones was invited by Randall Davidson, Archbishop of Canterbury, to become the first bishop of the new Diocese of Fukien, China (which was to be created from the Diocese of Victoria); he ultimately declined the See because his wife was ill.

From there he rose rapidly, becoming successively Rural Dean and then Archdeacon: he was appointed Vicar of Bradford in 1906 (he was in post by August) and was additionally Rural Dean of Bradford by 1910. His appointment as Archdeacon of Sheffield and Vicar of Sheffield (then in the Diocese of York) was announced in August 1912 and he was installed as Archdeacon at York Minster on 15 January 1913. During this time, he was identified by others as an Evangelical. In 1914 — the year the Diocese of Sheffield was erected from that of York — he was made an honorary canon of the new diocese. Later that year, the Great War broke out and Gresford Jones saw service as a Chaplain of the Royal Army Chaplains' Department, 1914–1919.

In January 1920, it was announced that he had been appointed Dean of Salisbury; but he withdrew his acceptance of the Deanery in favour of going to Uganda.

== Episcopal ministry ==
In 1920, he was appointed as the first suffragan bishop in the Diocese of Uganda, taking the title Bishop of Kampala; he was consecrated into bishop's orders on 24 June (St John the Baptist's Day, by Davidson at St Paul's Cathedral) and attended the Lambeth Conference in July. In November 1923, it was announced that he would become Vicar of Pershore: his return to England was, at least in part, to do with "the tropical climate". He was in post at Pershore by Trinity Sunday 1924 (15 June).

In August 1927, it was announced that Gresford Jones had been appointed to the parish of Winwick, vacant by the resignation of Edwin Kempson, who held it with the See of Warrington. Shortly afterwards, he was appointed to succeed Kempson as Bishop of Warrington, the sole suffragan bishop of the Diocese of Liverpool; he served as such from 1927 until 1945. He was invested as bishop-suffragan by Cosmo Lang, Archbishop of York, at York Minster on 10 November 1927 and welcomed in a public ceremony at Liverpool Cathedral on 19 November.

Remaining Bishop of Warrington, he was appointed a canon residentiary of the cathedral in February 1935, resigning the living of Winwick later that year. In 1942, Gresford Jones served as Deputy Prolocutor of the Lower House of the Convocation of York; in the same year, his son Michael was appointed Bishop of Willesden; so father and son were both serving bishops for almost three years. Herbert retired as Bishop of Warrington effective 31 December 1945, remaining Canon of Liverpool until 1956. A firm friend to churches overseas, he retired after 18 years as a bishop and died on 22 June 1958. In retirement, he served as an honorary assistant bishop of Liverpool, from January 1956 until his death.

== Works ==
- Foreign Missions and the Modern Mind, 1905
- Uganda in Transformation, 1926

Church of England titles
Preceded by John Eyre	Archdeacon of Sheffield; 1912–1920	Succeeded by Charles Lisle Carr
Preceded by Edwin Kempson	Bishop of Warrington; 1927–1945	Succeeded by Charles Claxton
