= Michael Paton (priest) =

The Venerable Michael John Macdonald Paton was an eminent Anglican priest and author in the 20th century.

Paton was born on 25 November 1922, and educated at Repton and Magdalen College, Oxford. After service with the Indian Army and the Foreign Office, he was ordained in 1954. He was a curate at All Saints’, Gosforth and then held incumbencies at St Chad's, Sheffield and St Mark's, Broomhill. In 1978 he was appointed Archdeacon of Sheffield, a post he held for nine years. He died on 6 November 2016.

Church of England titles
Preceded by Hayman Johnson	Archdeacon of Sheffield; 1978–1987	Succeeded by Stephen Richard Lowe
