= Robin Woods =

English Anglican bishop (1914–1997)

The Right Reverend Robin Woods KCMG KCVO
- Bishop of Worcester
- Church: Church of England
- Diocese: Diocese of Worcester
- In office: 1971 to 1982
- Predecessor: Mervyn Charles-Edwards
- Successor: Philip Goodrich

Orders
- Ordination: 1938 (deacon); 1939 (priest)
- Consecration: c. 1971

Personal details
- Born: Robert Wilmer Woods; 14 February 1914
- Died: 20 October 1997 (aged 83)
- Denomination: Anglicanism
- Education: Gresham's School; Trinity College, Cambridge
- Military career
- Allegiance: United Kingdom
- Branch: British Army
- Service years: 1942–1946
- Rank: Chaplain to the Forces
- Service number: 239275
- Unit: Royal Army Chaplains' Department
- Conflicts: World War II
- Awards: Mentioned in Dispatches

Robert Wilmer Woods KCMG KCVO (14 February 1914 – 20 October 1997), known as Robin Woods, was an English Anglican bishop. He was the Bishop of Worcester from 1971 to 1982. He previously served as Archdeacon of Sheffield from 1958 to 1962, and as Dean of Windsor from 1962 to 1970.

== Early life and education ==
Woods was the youngest son of the Right Reverend Edward Sydney Woods (1877–1953), Bishop of Lichfield, and Clemence Barclay. He was the brother of the photographer Janet Woods, Samuel Woods, an archdeacon in New Zealand, and Frank Woods, Archbishop of Melbourne, and a nephew of Theodore Woods, who had served as Bishop of Winchester.

He was educated at The New Beacon, Gresham's School, Holt, and Trinity College, Cambridge.

== Career ==
=== Ordained ministry ===
Woods was ordained a deacon of the Church of England in 1938 and a priest in 1939. He was Assistant Secretary of the Student Christian Movement between 1937 and 1942. His first clerical position was as curate at St Edmund the King, Lombard Street, London 1938–1939, and at Hoddesdon 1939–1942.

=== Military service ===
Woods served in the British Army during World War II from 1942 to 1946. On 26 September 1942, he was commissioned into the Royal Army Chaplains' Department as a Chaplain to the Forces 4th Class (equivalent to captain). In November 1945, he was mentioned in dispatches "in recognition of gallant and distinguished services in Italy".

=== Post-war ===
After the war, he was given his first benefice as Vicar of South Wigston, Leicester, in 1946, then in 1951 went to Malaya as Archdeacon of Singapore and Vicar of St Andrew's Cathedral. In 1958 he returned to England to become Archdeacon of Sheffield and Rector of Tankersley. In 1962, he was appointed Dean of Windsor and Domestic Chaplain to Elizabeth II and played an influential part in the education of Charles, Prince of Wales. It was his recommendation to send Charles to Trinity College, Cambridge, his own old college. While at Windsor, he also served as Registrar of the Most Noble Order of the Garter. In 1970, he became Bishop of Worcester and was appointed a Knight Commander of the Royal Victorian Order, an honour in the personal gift of the sovereign. He retired effective 31 October 1981.

Other positions Woods held include:

- Prelate of the Order of St Michael and St George
- Secretary of the Anglican-Methodist Commission for Unity, 1965–1974
- Member of Council of the Duke of Edinburgh's Award Scheme, from 1968
- Member of the Public Schools Commission, 1968–1970
- Governor of Haileybury and Imperial Service College
- Visitor of Malvern College, 1970–1981
- President and Chairman of Council of Queen's College, Birmingham, 1970–1985
- Chairman of the Windsor Festival Company, 1969–1971
- Chairman of the Churches Television Centre, 1969–79
- Director of Christian Aid, 1969

== Later life and death ==
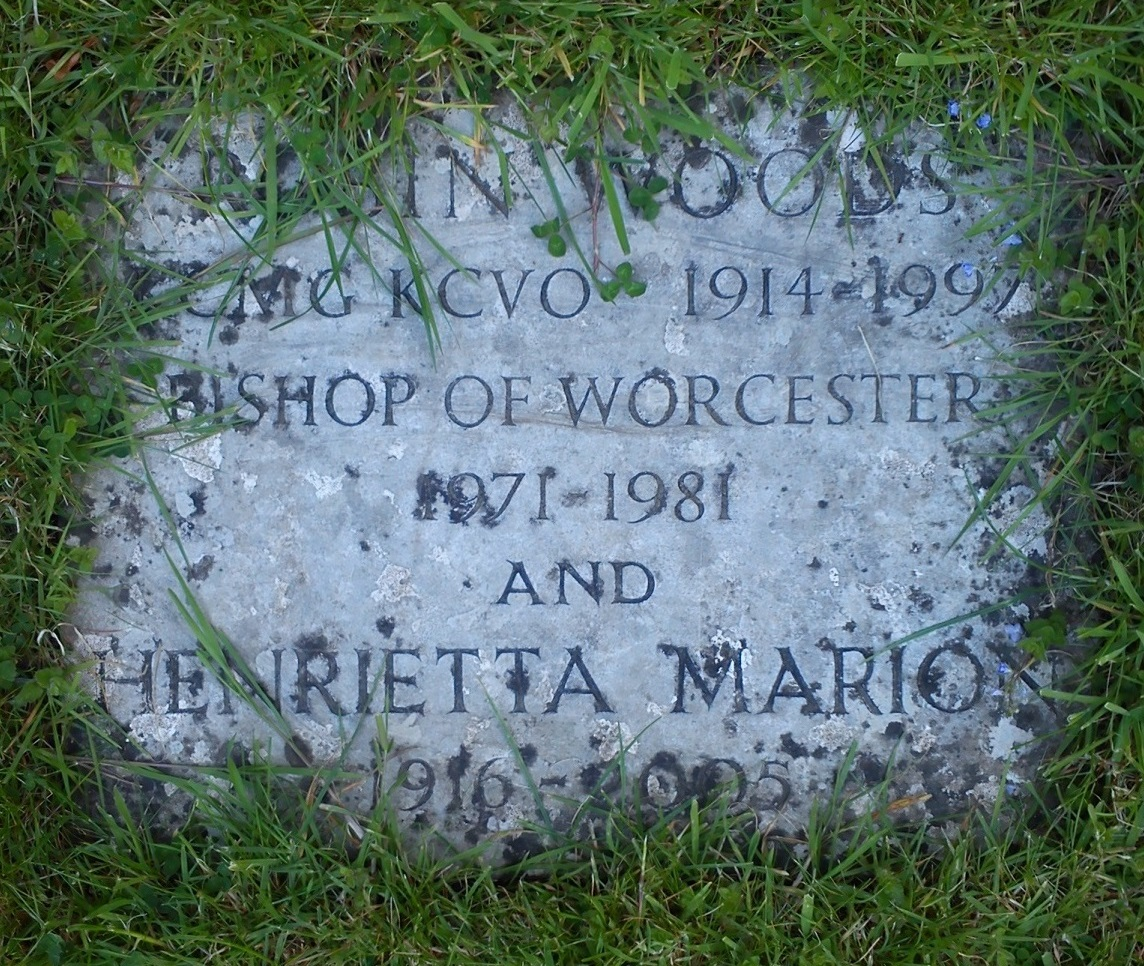
Worcester Cathedral, grave of Bishop Robin Woods in the Cathedral Cloisters

His ashes are buried in the cloisters of Worcester Cathedral.

According to his obituary in The Times, Woods was the most successful Dean of Windsor in the twentieth century.

== Honours ==
- Knight Commander of the Royal Victorian Order, 1971
- Knight Commander of the Order of St Michael and St George, 1989
- A judge of the Templeton Prize

== Family ==
Woods married Henrietta ("Etta") Marion Wilson, in 1942, and they had two sons and three daughters. His widow died on 8 February 2005, at the age of 88. Through this marriage Woods became one of the wealthiest clergymen in the Church of England.

== In television ==
Woods was portrayed by Tim McMullan in the Netflix series The Crown, although his appointment as Dean of Windsor appears to be set around the time of the first Moon landing in 1969.

== Publications ==
- Lord of All, Hear Our Prayer (ed.)
- Robin Woods: an autobiography (1986) ISBN 978-0-334-02424-8

== Sources ==
- Who's Who 1993 (A. & C. Black, London, 1993) p.2063
- Robin Woods: an autobiography (SCM Press, 1986)
- Telegraph wills

Church of England titles
Preceded by Douglas Harrison	Archdeacon of Sheffield; 1958–1962	Succeeded by Hayman Johnson
Preceded by Eric Hamilton	Dean of Windsor; 1962–1971	Succeeded by Launcelot Fleming
Preceded by Lewis Mervyn Charles-Edwards	Bishop of Worcester; 1971–1982	Succeeded by Philip Goodrich
