= Samuel Woods (priest) =

Samuel Edward Woods (1910-2001) was an archdeacon in New Zealand in the second half of the twentieth century.

== Life ==
He was the son of Edward Woods, Bishop of Lichfield, and the brother of the photographer Janet Woods, Frank Woods, Archbishop of Melbourne, and Robin Woods, Bishop of Worcester.

He was educated at Trinity College, Cambridge, and was ordained in 1937. He was a chaplain to the Student Christian Movement in Christchurch, New Zealand, from 1936 to 1941 then Precentor of Christchurch Cathedral, Christchurch, from 1939 to 1941. After this he was the Vicar at Ross from 1941 until 1942, when he became a chaplain in the Royal New Zealand Air Force. After the war he returned to England and held further incumbencies at Southport and Bishop's Hatfield.

In 1955 he returned to New Zealand to be Vicar of Sydenham. He was Archdeacon of Rangiora from 1955 until 1959, and again from 1963 until 1968; in between these two periods he was Archdeacon of Sumner; and finally he was Archdeacon of Akaroa from 1974 until 1977.
