= John Blakeney (priest) =

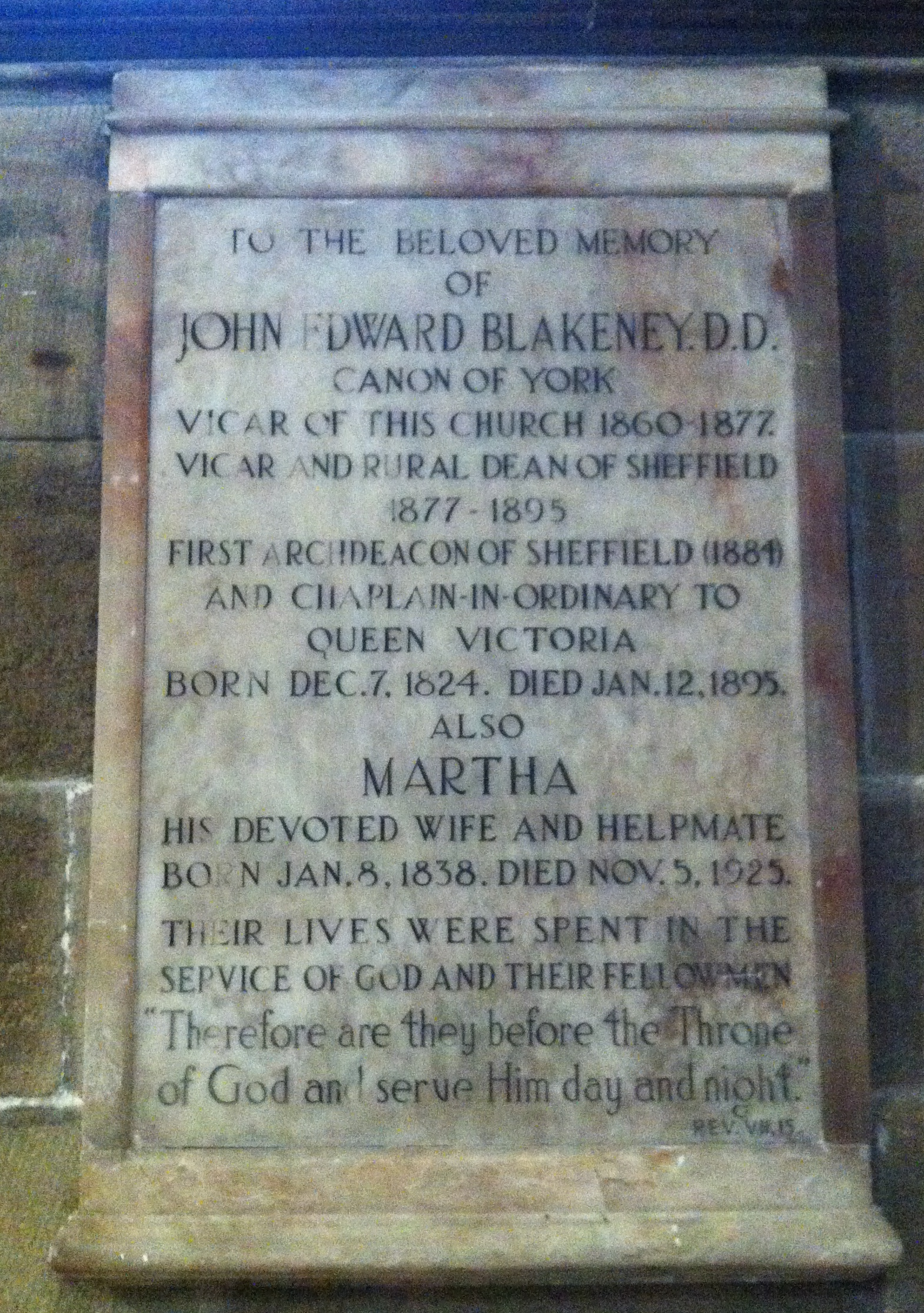
Memorial in Sheffield Cathedral

John Edward Blakeney was an Anglican priest in the 19th century.

He was educated at Trinity College, Dublin and ordained in 1849. After a curacy at Christ Church Claughton he became Vicar of St Paul, Sheffield in 1860. He was Archdeacon of Sheffield from 1884 until his death.

== Family ==
His only daughter, Martha Susan Blakeney, married in 1880 Samuel Roberts, later Lord Mayor of Sheffield, MP for Sheffield, and created a Baronet.

Church of England titles
First	Archdeacon of Sheffield; 1884–1895	Succeeded by Henry Favell
