= Richard Blackburn (bishop) =

Anglican bishop (born 1952)

The Right Reverend Richard Blackburn
- Bishop of Warrington
- Church: Church of England
- Diocese: Diocese of Liverpool
- In office: 2009–2018
- Predecessor: David Jennings
- Other posts: Archdeacon of Sheffield and Rotherham (1999–2009) acting Bishop of Sodor and Man (2016–2017)

Orders
- Ordination: 1983
- Consecration: 3 November 2009

Personal details
- Born: 22 January 1952 (age 74) Denmark
- Denomination: Anglican
- Residence: Prescot, Knowsley
- Spouse: Helen, a priest (m. 1980)
- Children: Four
- Education: University of Durham

Richard Finn Blackburn (born 22 January 1952) is a British retired Anglican bishop. From 2009 until 2018, he served as the Bishop of Warrington — the sole suffragan bishop in the Church of England Diocese of Liverpool; he was also temporarily the acting Bishop of Sodor and Man (the Church of England on the Isle of Man), 2016–2017.

== Early life and education ==
Born in Denmark, Blackburn grew up in Yorkshire. He was educated at Aysgarth School, and later Eastbourne College before going to Durham University to study theology. He was President of the Durham Union Society, graduating from St John's College, Durham with a Bachelor of Arts degree; He also studied at Hull University, receiving a Master of Arts degree, followed by ordination training at Westcott House, Cambridge.

== Ordained ministry ==
Blackburn was ordained (in the Church of England): made a deacon at Petertide 1983 (26 June), by Graham Leonard, Bishop of London, at St Paul's Cathedral, and ordained a priest the Petertide following (1 July 1984), by Jim Thompson, Bishop of Stepney, at his title church. He served his curacy at St Dunstan's, Stepney from 1983 to 1987, and then served for five and a half years as priest in charge of St John’s Isleworth until 1992. He was then Vicar of St Mark’s Mosborough from 1992, during which time he was also Area Dean of Attercliffe starting in 1996 and an honorary canon of Sheffield Cathedral from 1998. In 1999 he became Archdeacon of Sheffield and Rotherham until 2009 and a canon residentiary of Sheffield Cathedral until 2005; during this time, his partner was ordained there and served as the cathedral curate.

=== Episcopal ministry ===
On 27 August 2009, it was announced that Blackburn had been appointed to the episcopacy as Bishop of Warrington, the suffragan bishop of the Diocese of Liverpool, succeeding David Jennings. He was ordained and consecrated a bishop at York Minster on 3 November 2009. He was installed during a service at Liverpool Cathedral on 7 November 2009.

Blackburn retired from full-time ministry in 2018: a farewell Eucharist was held for him at Liverpool Cathedral on 21 April 2018.

== Personal life ==
Blackburn married Helen in 1980 and they have four children; Helen is also ordained in the Church of England: made a deacon at Petertide 1999 (4 July) and ordained a priest the Petertide following (5 July 2000), both times by Jack Nicholls, Bishop of Sheffield, at Sheffield Cathedral.

== Styles ==
- The Reverend Richard Blackburn (1983–1998)
- The Reverend Canon Richard Blackburn (1998–1999)
- The Venerable Richard Blackburn (1999–2009)
- The Right Reverend Richard Blackburn (2009–present)

Church of England titles
Preceded by David Jennings	Bishop of Warrington; 2009–2018	Succeeded by Bev Mason
