= Horace Dammers =

British Anglican dean and author

Alfred Hounsell "Horace" Dammers (10 July 1921 – 23 August 2004) was a British Anglican dean and author in the second half of the 20th century.

He was born in Great Yarmouth, on 10 July 1921 to a family of Hanoverian origin; his great-grandfather was Adjutant-General to King George V of Hanover. Dammers was educated at Malvern (where he was given the name 'Horace' in reference to his countryman's ruddy complexion) and Pembroke College, Cambridge. He served in the Royal Artillery during World War II and was ordained in 1948. His first posts were curacies in Adlington and Edgbaston. He was a Lecturer at Queen’s College, Birmingham and then Chaplain of St John’s College, Palayamkottai. Next he became Vicar of Holy Trinity, Millhouses. In 1965, he became a Canon Residentiary and Director of Studies at Coventry Cathedral until his appointment as the Dean of Bristol in 1973, a post he held until retirement fourteen years later. He fathered four children, one of whom is musician Jerry Dammers, founder of the Specials and Two Tone Records.

Church of England titles
Preceded by Douglas Ernest William Harrison	Deans of Bristol; 1973–1987	Succeeded by Arthur Wesley Carr
