= John Eyre (Archdeacon of Sheffield) =

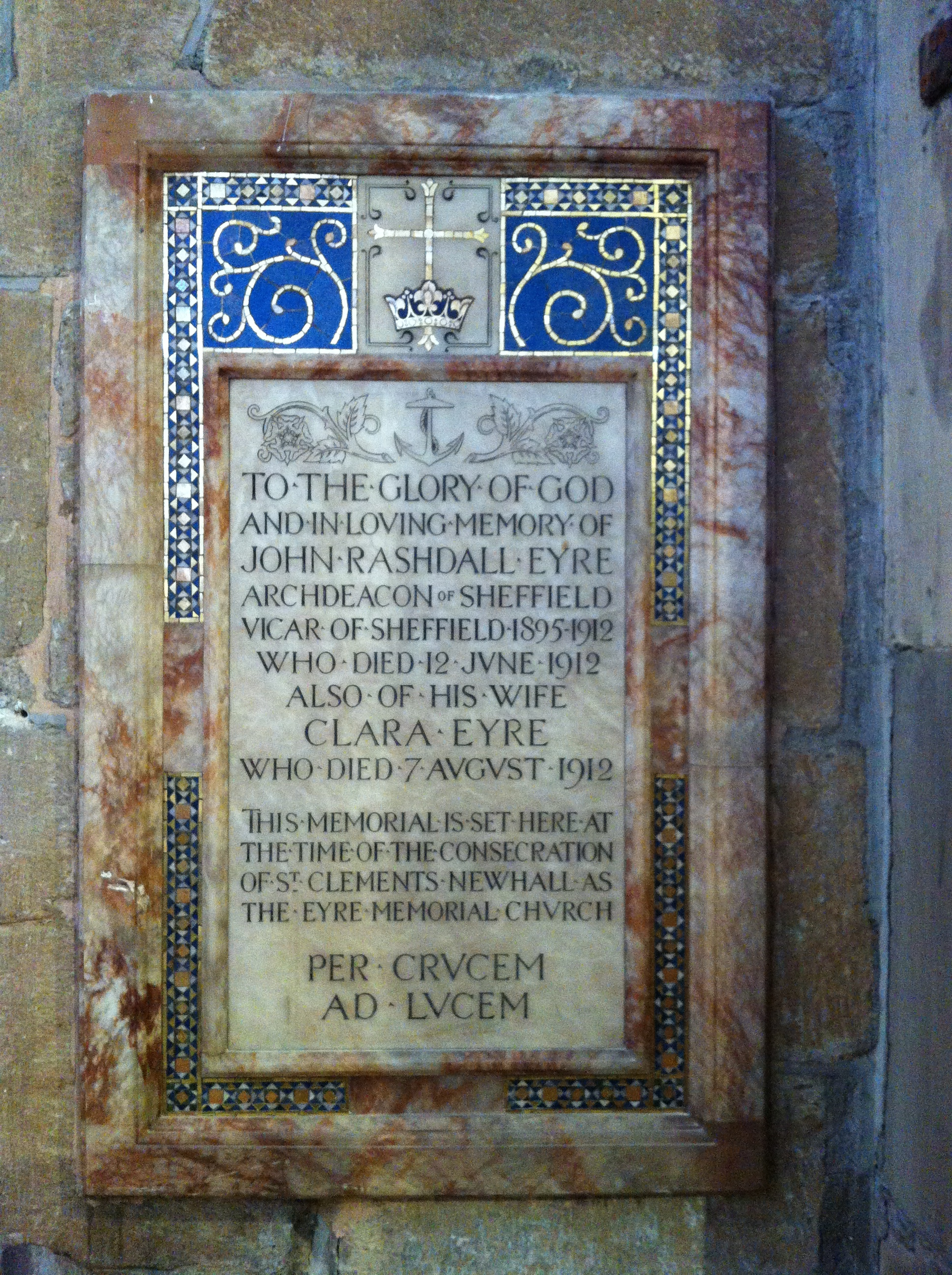
Memorial in Sheffield Cathedral

John Rashdall Eyre was an Anglican priest in the late 19th and early 20th centuries.

He was born 21 June 1845, and educated at Clare College, Cambridge. Ordained in 1873, he was a minor canon at Chester Cathedral, Rural Dean of Toxteth, Vicar of St Helens, Merseyside and Rector of Tiverton before being appointed Archdeacon of Sheffield in 1895, a post he held until his death on 12 June 1912. Three years later his son, Charles, was killed in action during the First World War.

== Notes ==
Church of England titles
Preceded by Henry Arnold Favell	Archdeacon of Sheffield; 1896–1912	Succeeded by Herbert Gresford Jones
