= Cyril Garbett =

British Archbishop of York (1875–1955)

The Most Reverend and Right Honourable Cyril Garbett GCVO
- Archbishop of York
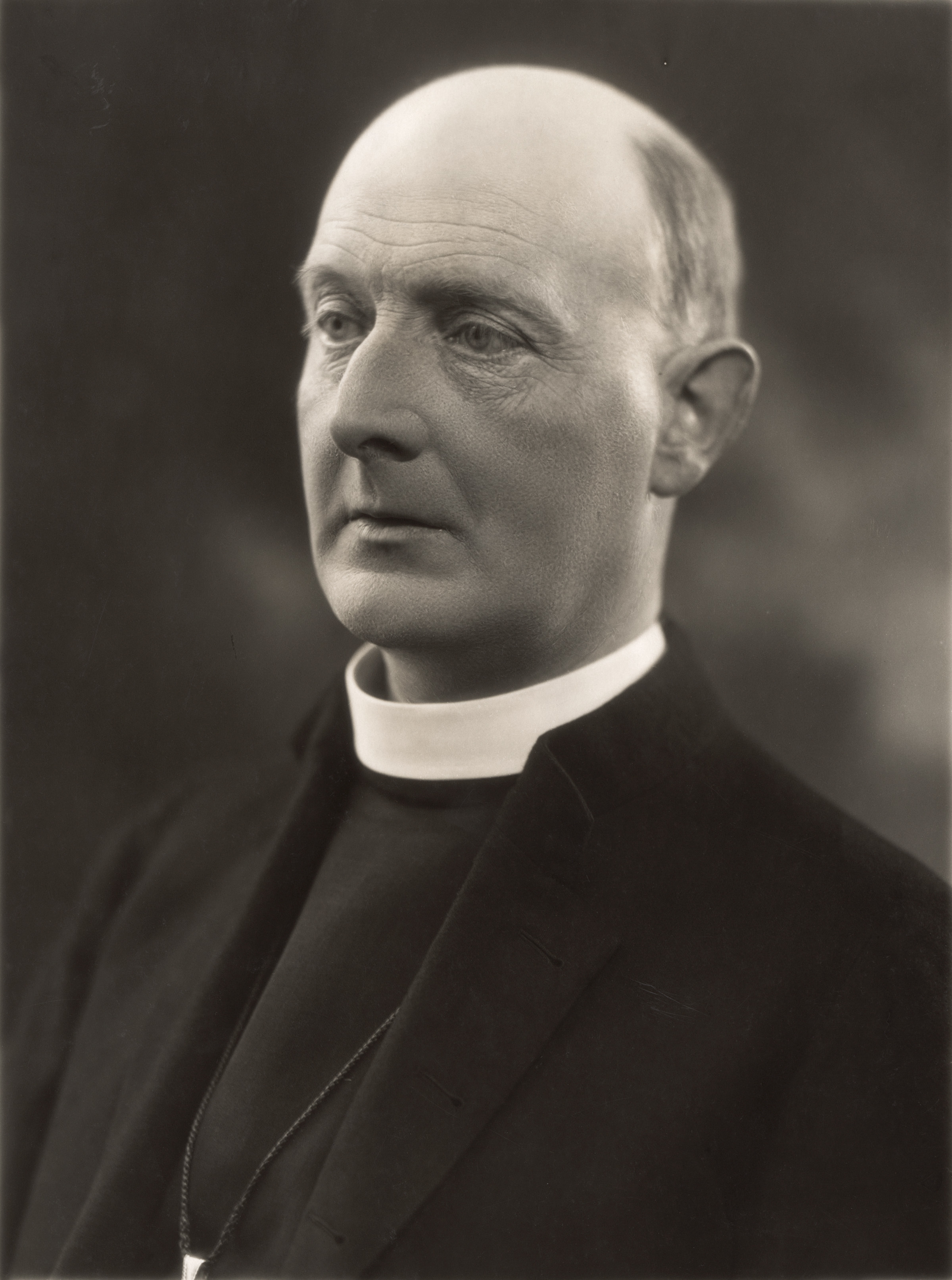
- Garbett in 1923
- Church: Church of England
- Province: Province of York
- Installed: 11 June 1942
- Term ended: 6 February 1955
- Predecessor: William Temple
- Successor: Michael Ramsey

Orders
- Ordination: 1899 (deacon); 1901 (priest)
- Consecration: 1919

Personal details
- Born: Cyril Forster Garbett; 6 February 1875 Tongham, Surrey
- Died: 31 December 1955 (aged 80) West Riding of Yorkshire

Cyril Forster Garbett GCVO (6 February 1875 – 31 December 1955) was an Anglican bishop and author. He was successively Bishop of Southwark (1919–32), Bishop of Winchester (1932–42) and Archbishop of York (1942–55).

== Early life ==
Garbett was born in the village of Tongham in Surrey, next to Aldershot in Hampshire, the son of the Rev Charles Garbett, the vicar of Tongham. At the age of 11, he was sent to Portsmouth Grammar School and then to Keble College, Oxford, in 1894. After this, he went to Cuddesdon Theological College to study theology and prepare for ordination.

== Ordained ministry ==
Garbett was ordained in 1899 as a deacon and was sent to be a curate of St Mary's Church, Portsea, where he was ordained to the priesthood in 1901 and remained until 1919, after 1909 as its vicar. In 1911 he was joined at Portsea by the newly ordained George Armitage Chase, who would later serve Garbett after his ordination to the episcopate, as examining chaplain. Tubby Clayton, later to found Toc H, was his curate from 1910 to 1915.

Garbett was consecrated as the Bishop of Southwark by Randall Davidson, Archbishop of Canterbury, at St Paul's Cathedral on St Luke's day (18 October) 1919 and remained in this position until his translation as the Bishop of Winchester in 1932 before, in 1942, becoming the Archbishop of York.

=== Archbishop of York ===
Garbett was a popular public figure, especially as a pastoral bishop, famous for trudging the length of his dioceses with his walking stick, visiting both clergy and lay people in the towns he passed through.

On the other hand, Garbett belonged to the generation which was comfortable with the idea of diversity in the Church of England and had little patience for High Church versus Low Church struggles. He was a pioneer of the Ecumenical Movement and, during and after the Second World War, travelled extensively, including to Communist Bloc countries. Although generally perceived as leaning rightwards politically, he was comfortable with the welfare state which emerged during his archiepiscopate.

Garbett's trip to Moscow in September 1943, at the invitation of the Moscow Patriarchate, was greeted by the newly installed Moscow Patriarch Sergiy (Stragorodskiy), was used by Joseph Stalin's propaganda machine to spread falsehoods about religious freedom in the USSR: on 24 September, the New York Times quoted Garbett as stating that "he was convinced that there was the fullest freedom of worship in the Soviet Union". However, during the Cold War, Garbett denounced communism as un-Christian and actively supported the British government line.

On 17 April 1944, Garbett appeared on the cover of Time magazine after he had been persuaded by the British Ministry of Information to go to the United States to discuss religious freedom in Russia. During this visit, he said that "Marshall Stalin, being a great statesman, has recognised the power of religion."

Garbett's visit to Dublin, where he met President de Valera, was considered significant.

Garbett sat in the House of Lords for many years as a Lord Spiritual and, as an erastian, he took his duties very seriously. In a notable statement made to the House of Lords in 1942, Garbett denounced Nazi Germany's extermination of Polish Jews, calling it "the deliberate and cold-blooded massacre of a nation".

On his retirement, Garbett was offered and accepted a hereditary barony, but he died before this could be legally created.

== Final years ==
Garbett continued to work into his late seventies, which eventually took its toll. He baptised Princess Anne, the second child and only daughter of the Princess Elizabeth, Duchess of Edinburgh (later Elizabeth II) and Philip, Duke of Edinburgh on 21 October 1950 in the Music Room at Buckingham Palace.

In 1953, he established the Queen's School, Jamaica in dedication to Her Majesty Queen Elizabeth II. On his eightieth birthday, 6 February 1955, he retired from active ministry and was created a Knight Grand Cross of the Royal Victorian Order. Later that year, he underwent surgery and spent the last months of his life in a convalescent home where he continued to write and correspond until his death, on 31 December 1955.

== Selected works ==
Amongst those he wrote:

- Garbett, Cyril (1905). Can we Believe? Reasonable words for reasonable men. London: Masters & Co.
- Garbett, Cyril (1911). The Church and Modern Problems. London: Edward Arnold.
- Garbett, Cyril (1915). The Challenge of the King, and other addresses. London: Wells Gardner & Co.
- Garbett, C. F., ed. (1915). The Work of a Great Parish. London: Longmans & Co.
- Garbett, Cyril (1924). After the War. London: S.P.C.K.
- Garbett, Cyril (1929). Secularism and Christian Unity. London: S.P.C.K.
- Garbett, Cyril (1931). In the Heart of South London. London: Longmans & Co.
- Garbett, Cyril (1933). The Challenge of the Slums. London: S.P.C.K.
- Garbett, Cyril (1935). A Call to Christians: The presidential address given at the Church Congress at Bournemouth on October 8th, 1935. London: Hodder & Stoughton.
- Garbett, Cyril (1940). The Church and Social Problems in Peace and War. London: Press and Publications Board of the Church Assembly.
- Garbett, Cyril (1940). What is Man?. London: Hodder & Stoughton.
- Garbett, Cyril (1941). We would see Jesus. London: Longmans & Co.
- Garbett, Cyril (1945). Physician Heal Thyself: a call for Church Reform. London: Hodder and Stoughton.
- Garbett, Cyril (1945). The Burge Memorial Lecture: The Christian churches and international peace. London: S.C.M. Press.
- Garbett, Cyril (1948). Christianity and Communism. Westminster: Industrial Christian Fellowship.
- Garbett, Cyril (1949). Watchman, what of the night?: eight addresses on problems of the day. Religious Book Club.
- Trilogy: Vol. I, The Claims of the Church of England (1947); Vol. II, Church and State (1950); Vol. III, In an Age of Revolution (1952)
- Garbett, Cyril (1953). The Church of England Today. London: Hodder & Stoughton.
- Garbett, Cyril (1955). World Problems of Today. London: Hodder & Stoughton.

Church of England titles
Preceded by Hubert Burge	Bishop of Southwark; 1919–1932	Succeeded by Richard Parsons
Preceded by Theodore Woods	Bishop of Winchester; 1932–1942	Succeeded by Mervyn Haigh
Preceded by William Temple	Archbishop of York; 1942–1955	Succeeded by Michael Ramsey
