= Bishop of Warrington =

Anglican suffragan bishop in England

The Bishop of Warrington is an episcopal title used by a suffragan bishop of the Church of England Diocese of Liverpool, in the Province of York, England. The title takes its name after the town of Warrington in Cheshire; the most recent bishop's official residence was in Eccleston Park, St Helens.

== List of bishops of Warrington ==
Bishops of Warrington
From	Until	Incumbent	Notes
1918	1920	Linton Smith	(1869–1950). Translated to Hereford on 5 October 1920.
1920	1927	Edwin Kempson	(1862–1931)
1927	1946	Herbert Gresford Jones	(1870–1958)
1946	1960	Charles Claxton	(1903–1992). Translated to Blackburn on 18 July 1960.
1960	1969	Laurie Brown	(1907–1994). Translated to Birmingham on 9 December 1969.
1970	1975	John Bickersteth	(b. 1921). Translated to Bath and Wells on 12 December 1975.
1976	1996	Michael Henshall	(1928–2017)
1996	2000	John Packer	(b. 1946). Consecrated in November 1996 at York Minster and installed at Liverpool Cathedral on 21 November 1996; translated to Ripon and Leeds
2000	2009	David Jennings	(b. 1944). Nominated on 11 July 2000; Resigned on 30 September 2009.
2009	2018	Richard Blackburn	(b. 1952). Formerly Archdeacon of Sheffield and Rotherham
2018	2025	Bev Mason	(b. 1960). Consecrated 18 October 2018; took extended leave from diocesan duties; resigned 1 October 2025.
2026	present	Simon Robinson	(b. 1967). Consecrated on 30 April 2026 and installed on 23 May 2026.

== Bibliography ==
- Fryde, E. B.; Greenway, D. E.; Porter, S.; Roy, I., eds. (1986). Handbook of British Chronology (3rd, reprinted 2003 ed.). Cambridge: Cambridge University Press. ISBN 0-521-56350-X.
