= Lincoln Doull =

New Zealand cricketer (born 1964)

Lincoln John Doull (born 8 January 1964, in Pukekohe) is a former New Zealand first-class cricketer, who played for Wellington in the State Championship in the 1990s. He is the coach of the Central Districts Hinds in the State League and in 2005–06 he coached them through to victory in the State League final at Queen Elizabeth II Park in Christchurch.

His younger brother Simon Doull played Test cricket for New Zealand.
