= Frank Woods (bishop) =

English and Australian Anglican bishop (1907–1992)

The Most Reverend Sir Frank Woods KBE ChStJ
- Anglican Archbishop of Melbourne
- Church: Anglican Church of Australia
- Province: Victoria
- Diocese: Melbourne
- In office: 1958 to 1977
- Predecessor: Joseph Booth
- Successor: Robert Dann
- Other post: Anglican Primate of Australia (1971–1977)

Orders
- Ordination: 1932 (priest)
- Consecration: 1952 by Cyril Garbett

Personal details
- Born: 6 April 1907 Davos, Switzerland
- Died: 29 November 1992 (aged 85)
- Denomination: Anglicanism
- Spouse: Jean Sprules (m. 1936)
- Education: Marlborough College; Trinity College, Cambridge

Sir Frank Woods (6 April 1907 – 29 November 1992) was an English and Australian Anglican bishop. From 1957 to 1977, he was Archbishop of Melbourne. He was also the Primate of Australia from 1971 to 1977.

== Life and career ==
=== Early life ===
Woods was born in 1907 in Davos, Switzerland. He was the son of the Right Reverend Edward Sydney Woods (1877-1953), Bishop of Lichfield in the Church of England, and Rachel Clemence Barclay. In 1914, the family moved back to England where his father became an army chaplain and vicar before his consecration as the suffragan Bishop of Croydon in 1930, later becoming Bishop of Lichfield in 1937.

Woods' siblings included the photographer Janet Woods, Samuel Woods, an archdeacon in New Zealand, and Robin Woods, Bishop of Worcester. His uncle Theodore Woods was Bishop of Winchester.

=== Education ===
Woods was educated at Marlborough College from 1920. In 1929 he was elected president of the Student Christian Movement (SCM) at Cambridge.

In 1930, Woods attended Trinity College, Cambridge, which lead to his master's degree in 1933.

=== Later years ===
On 9 June 1936, Woods married Jean Margaret Sprules. His father was the officiant of the wedding service which was held at St Alban's Abbey.

== Ordained ministry ==
Woods was ordained as a priest in 1932. After a curacy at St Mary's Church, Portsea, in the Diocese of Portsmouth he became chaplain of his Cambridge alma mater, Trinity College. He then became vice-principal of Wells Theological College. During the Second World War, he served as a chaplain in the Royal Naval Volunteer Reserve and then, successively, a vicar in Huddersfield (1945–52); Suffragan Bishop of Middleton (1952–57); and, in 1957, Archbishop of Melbourne for over 20 years. From 1971 he was also the Anglican Primate of Australia.

== Honours ==
Woods was appointed, on 3 June 1972, a Knight Commander of the Order of the British Empire (KBE). He used the title of "Sir", as is the established protocol in Australia for knighted clergy. He was also a Chaplain of the Order of St John (ChStJ).

Church of England titles
Preceded by Edward Mowll	Bishop of Middleton; 1952 to 1958	Succeeded by Robert Nelson
Anglican Communion titles
Preceded by Joseph Booth	Archbishop of Melbourne; 1957 to 1977	Succeeded by Bob Dann
Preceded by Philip Strong	Primate of Australia; 1971 to 1977	Succeeded by Marcus Loane
