= Simon Doull =

New Zealand cricketer (born 1969)

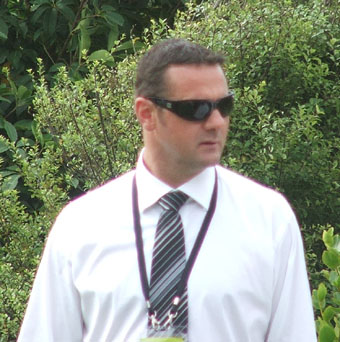

Personal information
- Full name: Simon Blair Doull
- Born: 6 August 1969 (age 57); Pukekohe, New Zealand
- Batting: Right-handed
- Bowling: Right-arm medium
- Role: Bowler
- Relatives: Lincoln Doull (brother)

International information
- National side: New Zealand (1992–2000)
- Test debut (cap 178): 1 November 1992 v Zimbabwe
- Last Test: 24 March 2000 v Australia
- ODI debut (cap 78): 31 October 1992 v Zimbabwe
- Last ODI: 3 March 2000 v Australia

Domestic team information
- Years: Team
- 1989/90–2001/02: Northern Districts

Career statistics
Competition	Test	ODI	FC	LA
Matches	32	42	99	126
Runs scored	570	172	1,938	919
Batting average	14.61	12.28	19.57	12.41
100s/50s	0/0	0/0	1/4	0/3
Top score	46	22	108	80
Balls bowled	6,053	1,745	15,332	5,123
Wickets	98	36	250	107
Bowling average	29.30	40.52	28.93	35.14
5 wickets in innings	6	0	12	0
10 wickets in match	0	0	1	0
Best bowling	7/65	4/25	7/65	4/15
Catches/stumpings	16/–	10/–	28/–	40/–
- Source: Cricinfo, 2 May 2017

Simon Blair Doull (born 6 August 1969) is a New Zealand radio personality, commentator, and former international cricketer. He was a right-arm medium pacer who was capable of swing bowling. He was plagued by injuries as a result of which his international career was cut short. Playing for the New Zealand national cricket team, he figured in just 32 Tests and 42 ODIs, taking 98 and 36 wickets respectively. Doull's finest hour arrived when he took 7–65 against India in the Boxing Day Wellington Test in 1998. He played his last Test, against Australia, in March 2000, before turning to commentary and broadcasting.

He is the younger brother of Lincoln Doull, who played for Wellington in the early 1990s.

Doull took his career best bowling figures of 7 for 65 in the Boxing Day Test in 1998 against India at the Basin Reserve in Wellington. Due to that performance, he reached a career-high ranking of 6 in the ICC Player Rankings on 26 December 1998.

Doull suffered persistent injuries throughout his career, including numerous back problems and a career-threatening knee injury during New Zealand's 1999 tour of England.

== After cricket ==
Currently, Doull works as a cricket commentator for New Zealand's Magic Talk. Until recently he was part of the Morning Rumble team on the radio station, The Rock.

He has been part of the commentary team for the Indian Premier League since 2008.

He was also selected as part of commentary team for ICC T20 worldcup 2024

He currently commentates on Sky Sports Cricket channel in the UK.
