= Alexander Doull =

Canadian Anglican bishop

The Right Reverend Alexander Doull
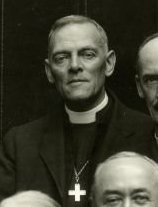
- Doull c. 1924
- Born: 8 September 1870
- Died: 16 December 1933 (aged 63); Vernon, British Columbia

Alexander John Doull was an Anglican bishop in the 20th century.

Doull was educated at Merchiston Castle School and Oriel College, Oxford. He trained for Holy Orders at Ripon College Cuddesdon.

Doull was ordained in the Church of England in 1896. He began his career with curacies at Leeds Parish Church and the Church of the Advent, Montreal, of which he was later Rector. From 1910 to 1914 he was Dean of Columbia at Christ Church Cathedral, Victoria until his appointment to the episcopate as the inaugural Bishop of Kootenay. He resigned his See in 1933 to become Archdeacon of Sheffield, but illness forced a return to British Columbia where he died on 15 February 1937.

Anglican Communion titles
Preceded by George Mason	Dean of Columbia; 1910–1914	Succeeded by Charles Schofield
New title	Bishop of Kootenay; 1915–1933	Succeeded by Walter Adams
Preceded by Alfred Jarvis	Archdeacon of Sheffield; 1933–1934	Succeeded by Alfred Jarvis
