= Douglas Harrison =

Anglican priest

Douglas Ernest William Harrison (30 March 1903 – 22 February 1974) was an Anglican priest.

Born in Bristol, Harrison was educated at Bristol Grammar School and St John's College, Oxford. He was ordained in 1926 and was a curate at St John's Waterloo, Liverpool. After this he was Vice-Principal of Wycliffe Hall, Oxford until 1942 and then Archdeacon of Sheffield until his appointment as Dean of Bristol.

He was the Dean of Bristol from 1957 to 1972.

Church of England titles
Preceded by Francis Evered Lunt	Dean of Bristol; 1957–1972	Succeeded by Alfred Hounsell Horace Dammers
