= Edward Woods (bishop) =

British Anglican bishop (1877–1953)

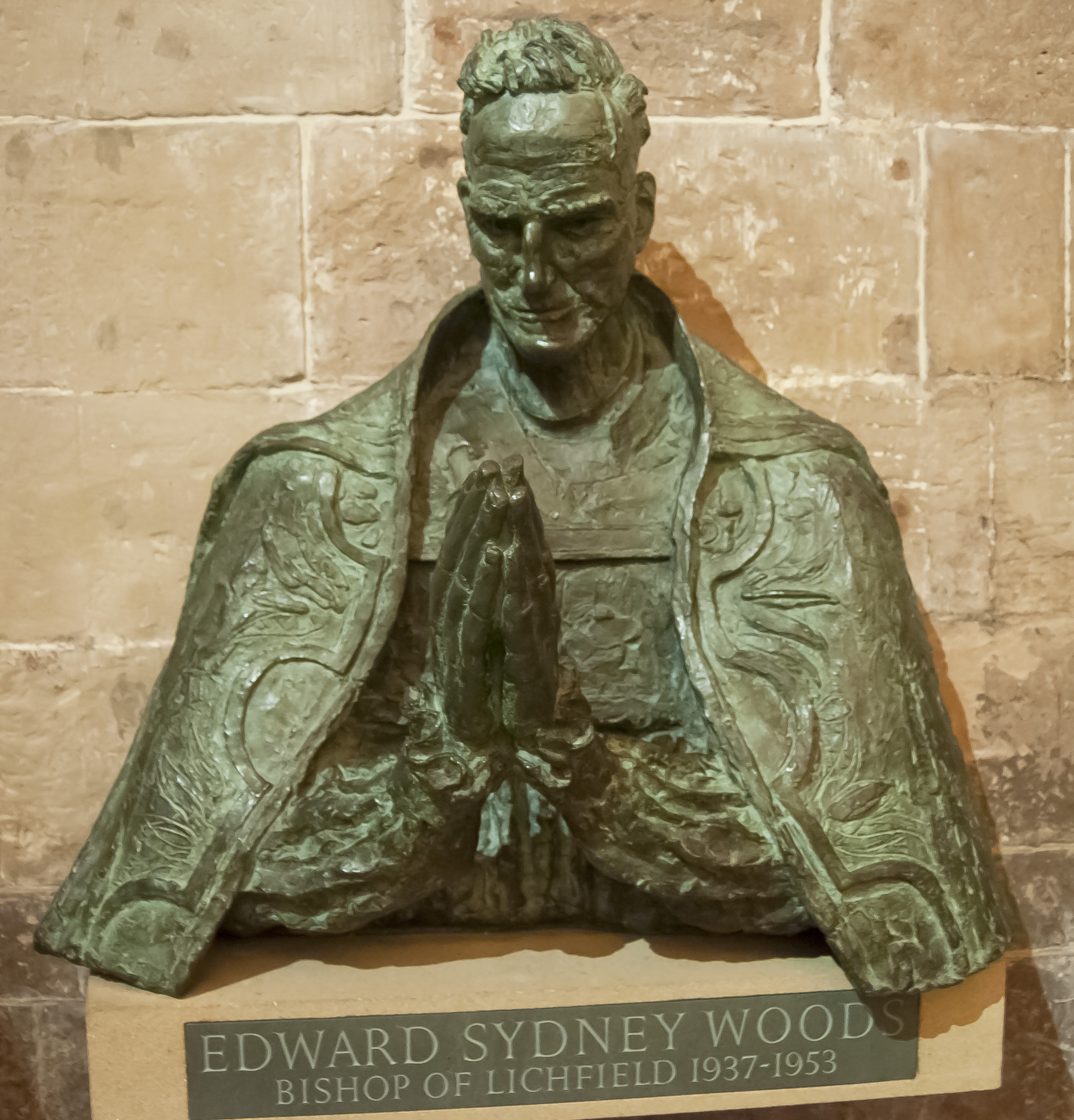
Bust of Woods, by Jacob Epstein, in Lichfield Cathedral

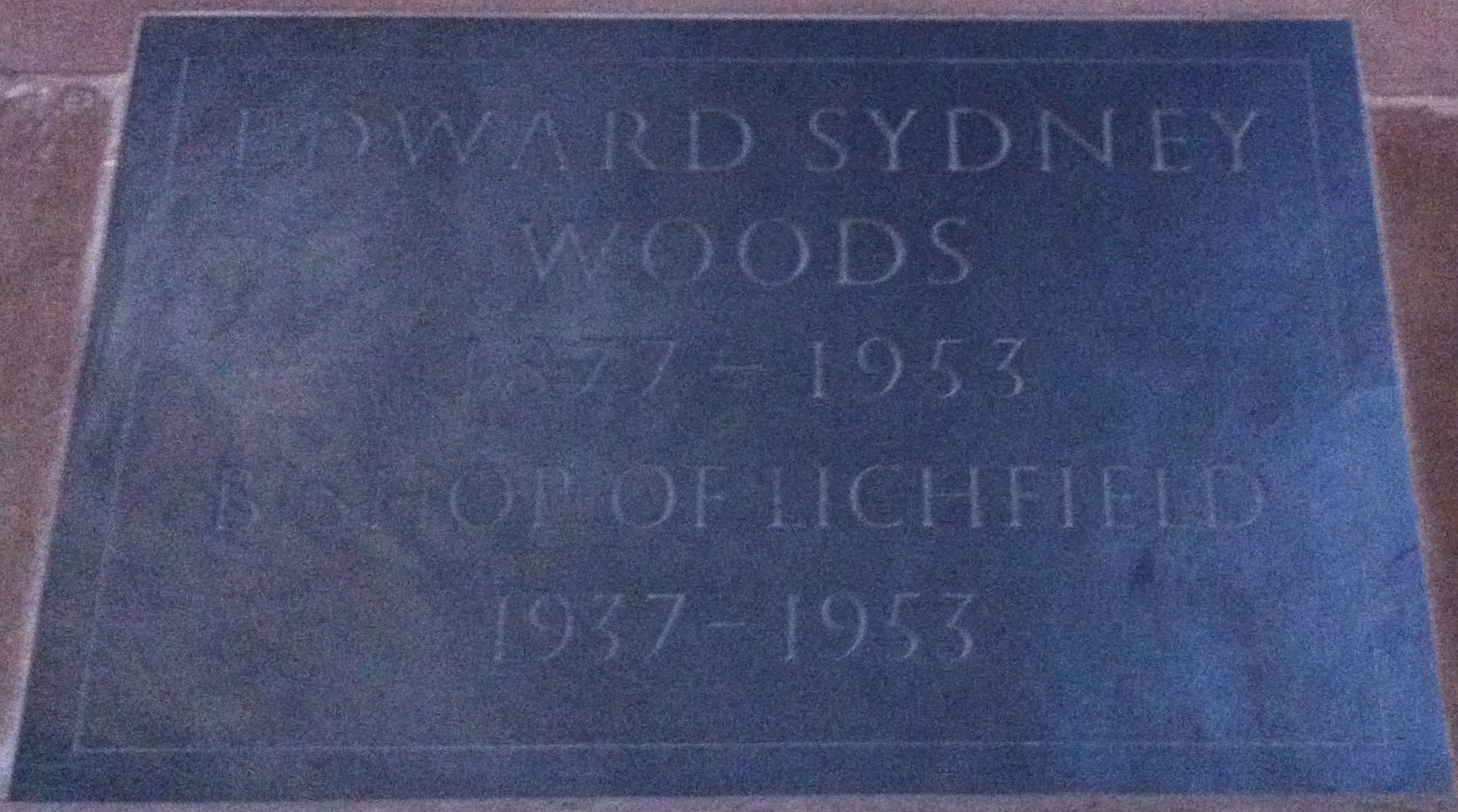
Memorial to Edward Sydney Woods in Lichfield Cathedral

Edward Sydney Woods (1 November 1877 – 11 January 1953) was an Anglican bishop, the second Bishop of Croydon (a suffragan bishop in the Diocese of Southwark) from 1930 until 1937 and, from then until his death, the 94th Bishop of Lichfield.

== Family ==
Woods was the son of the Rev. Frank Woods and a grandson of the civil engineer Edward Woods. His mother, Alice Fry, was a granddaughter of the prison reformer Elizabeth Fry. His brother, Theodore Woods, became Bishop of Winchester.

He married Clemence Barclay, a great great-granddaughter of Sir Thomas Fowell Buxton, and their children included the photographer Janet Stone, Samuel Woods, an archdeacon in New Zealand, Frank Woods, Archbishop of Melbourne, and Robin Woods, Bishop of Worcester.

== Education ==
Woods was educated at Marlborough College and Trinity College, Cambridge.

== Church career ==
He was ordained priest at Michaelmas 1902 (21 September), by Alwyne Compton, Bishop of Ely, at Ely Cathedral; and married Clemence Barclay the following year. He was Chaplain, Lecturer then Vice Principal of Ridley Hall, Cambridge followed by wartime service at the Royal Military College, Sandhurst. When peace returned he became Vicar of Holy Trinity, Cambridge. From there he moved to Croydon where he was successively vicar, rural dean, Archdeacon and suffragan bishop. He was consecrated a bishop on 1 May 1930, by Cosmo Lang, Archbishop of Canterbury, at Westminster Abbey. In 1937, he became the diocesan Bishop of Lichfield: he was formally translated by the confirmation of his election, after his predecessor's retirement in June but before his own enthronement on 22 September. He had the distinction of being one of two survivors of a German air raid by hiding under a dining table with Ann Charteris, the future wife of Ian Fleming.

Woods was Lord High Almoner from 1946 to 1953.

== Private life ==
Woods was an active Freemason under the United Grand Lodge of England. He was initiated on 26 April 1928 in Waddon Lodge No 4162, and whilst Bishop of Croydon he also joined Croydon Chantry Lodge No 5063.

== Death and memorials ==
Woods died in office on 11 January 1953, his wife having died a year earlier; he had recently returned from visiting the Far East (his son, Robin, was then Archdeacon of Singapore.) He was commemorated posthumously in a collection of appreciations.

He is commemorated in Lichfield Cathedral by a bust, the work of Jacob Epstein (1958).

== Works ==
He was a prolific author, his published works including:

- Forgiveness of Sins, London, SPCK, 1916
- (with Very Rev. F. B. Macnutt) Theodore, Bishop of Winchester, London, SPCK, 1933
- How stands religion?, Cambridge, Lutterworth, 1949
