= Archdeacon of Sumner =

The Archdeacon of Sumner is the title of a senior post that has been used at certain times within the Anglican Diocese of Christchurch, part of the Anglican Church in Aotearoa, New Zealand and Polynesia.
