= Ian Beck =

English children's illustrator and author

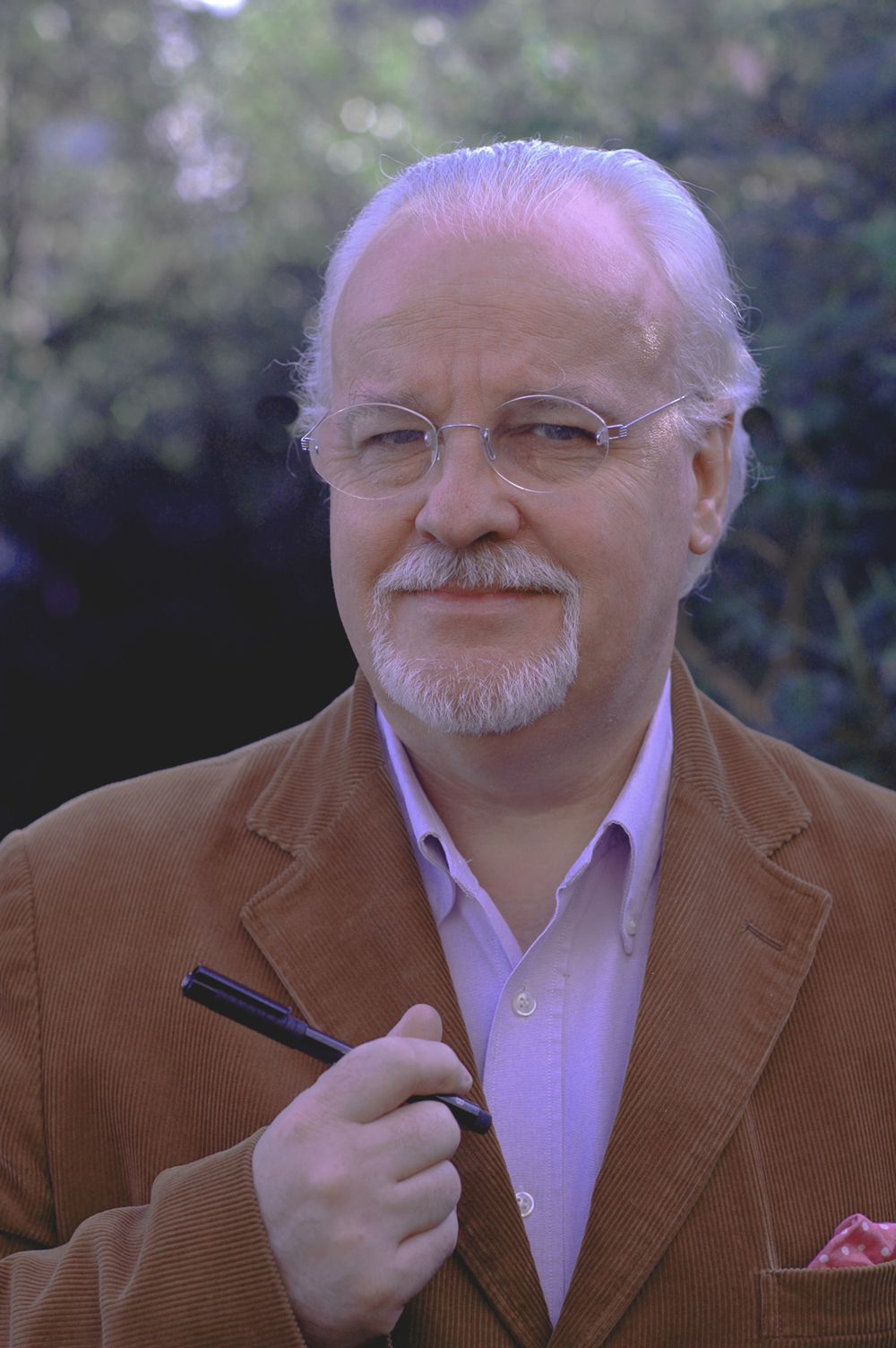
- Ian Beck
- Born: 17 August 1947 (age 79); Hove, Sussex, England, UK
- Education: Brighton College of Art (B.A.)
- Occupations: Novelist, illustrator
- Spouse: Emma Stone
- Children: 3
- Writing career
- Period: 1968−present
- Genres: Children's literature, fantasy

Ian Archibald Beck (born 17 August 1947 in Hove) is an English children's illustrator and author. In addition to his numerous children's books, he is also known for his cover illustration on Elton John's Goodbye Yellow Brick Road album. More than a million copies of his books have been sold worldwide. Beck was Master of the Art Workers' Guild in 1999.

== Early life ==
Having attended a local secondary modern school after failing the Eleven-plus examination, Ian Beck was encouraged by the art teacher and headmaster to attend Brighton College of Art where he studied illustration and graphic design, being taught by Raymond Briggs and John Vernon Lord. He graduated in 1968.

== Professional life ==
At this point, Beck moved to London, as a freelance illustrator while working part-time at Harrods in the toy department. He gradually built up a clientele, working for consumer magazines like Good Housekeeping, Cosmopolitan, and Homes and Gardens. He also began making advertisements for the recording industry, for artists like Ry Cooder and Richie Havens. He then went into designing and illustrating album covers as well such as Goodbye Yellow Brick Road, for Elton John. He carried on working in the record industry until the early 1980s. He has had many commissions from the Conran Design Group, including packaging, greeting cards, calendars, interior design panels. He also had a commission for murals in a restaurant at Gatwick Airport.

Oxford University Press had seen some drawings he had done for the Radio Times and wanted him to illustrate a project for children for them, which they wanted to publish. His first picture book, Round and Round the Garden, was published in 1982. After the success of this book, others followed and in 1989, he wrote his first story to illustrate, The Teddy Robber. In 1997 his book, Home Before Dark won a gold award in the best toy awards and in 2000 he again won the award, this time for Alone in the Woods. He again won the award for The Happy Bee. He was elected the Master of the Art Workers' Guild in 1999, and is a former president of the Double Crown Club.

He produced his first novel The Secret History of Tom Trueheart, Boy Adventurer, which was published on 1 June 2006; subsequent editions appeared in more than twenty languages. This was followed by the sequel Tom Trueheart and the Land of Dark Stories, which was published on 6 March 2008 and the third book in the series, Tom Trueheart and the Land of Myth and Legends on 2 September 2010. He has written three other novels, Pastworld (Bloomsbury, 2009), The Hidden Kingdom (Oxford University Press, 2011), and The Haunting of Charity Delafield (Bodley Head, 2011).

In 2012, Beck created a set of drawings of Charlie Chaplin, Buster Keaton and Little Tich for a hospital ward in Harrow, Middlesex, under the auspices of the charity The Nightingale Project. Beck has produced further drawings in this series, depicting other stars of music hall and early cinema, for a public exhibition entitled The Limelight Pictures that ran from February to June 2013. In 2017, Beck's first one-man exhibition of original drawings were held from 1924 June at the Art Workers’ Guild in London.

He is married with three children and continues in close touch with children through regular visits to schools and libraries, talking about the creation of his books and reading stories.
