= Sub-Dean of the Chapels Royal =

Sub-Dean of the Chapels Royal (full title: Sub-Dean of His Majesty's Chapels Royal) is an office held by a cleric in the Royal Household of the United Kingdom. As deputy to the Dean of the Chapels Royal (who is normally the Bishop of London), the Sub-Dean has day-to-day oversight of the Chapels Royal severally, while also exercising a particular ministry as chaplain for St James's Palace (where there are two royal chapels), which is where the Children and Gentlemen of the Chapel Royal are principally based.

In recent times, the person appointed Sub-Dean of the Chapels Royal has also been appointed Sub-Almoner (since 1899), Deputy Clerk of the Closet (since 1931) and Domestic Chaplain, Buckingham Palace (since 1909); as such, he or she is the only full-time clerical member of the Ecclesiastical Household.

== Background ==
The appointment of sub-dean in the 'King's Free Chapel of the Household' dates from 1483 (at the latest). The Black Book of the Household of Edward IV (which may be of a slightly earlier date) remarks that the dean 'assigns the sub-dean and the chanters to guide, keep and rule the choir in steadfast service and honourable demeaning'; at the time the sub-dean was chosen from among the Gentlemen of the Chapel. In an earlier period, the dean would appoint a deputy (Latin: deputatum) from time to time, to act on his behalf, but this was on a temporary basis.

By the eighteenth century the sub-dean was expected 'to supply the absence of the Dean, and to be as frequently at the Chapel as he can: to take care that everything therein be conducted with decency and regularity'. The Chapel Royal, having been based at the Palace of Whitehall during the 17th century, moved to St James's Palace in 1702 (though the sub-dean retained a grace-and-favour house in the vicinity of Whitehall, in Middle Scotland Yard, until 1792). A set of instructions, written in 1792, required the sub-dean to 'attend the Chapel Service daily as long as health will permit, particularly on Sundays and Holy Days'.

The Chapel Royal Commissioners, reporting in 1860, confirmed that the sub-dean's duties were 'principally confined to the Chapel Royal at St James's Palace', though he also retained jurisdiction over the German Chapel and the French Chapel (both at St James's), the Whitehall Chapel and the Savoy Chapel. That year, on the commissioners' recommendation, the position of Sub-Dean of the Chapels Royal was combined with that of Chaplain (previously styled 'Confessor') to the Household at St James's Palace (the next-most senior office-holder in the Chapel Royal, after the sub-dean). The duties of the Confessor had been 'to read Prayers every morning to the family, to visit the sick, to examine and prepare communicants, to give to such as desired it advice in any case of conscience or point of religion, etc.'.

In 1922, the office of sub-dean was renamed 'Precentor of the Chapels Royal'; but this title (described as 'misleading' by its then holder) was dropped in 1946 and the former designation reassumed.

== List of office-holders ==
- Paul Wright 2015 – present
- Bill Scott 2007–2015
- William James Booth 1991–2007
- Anthony Douglass Caesar 1979–1991
- James Seymour Denis Mansel 1965–1979
- Maurice Frederic Foxell 1948–1965
- Wallace Harold Elliott 1941–1948 (styled 'Precentor of His Majesty's Chapels Royal' until 1946)
- Launcelot Jefferson Percival 1922–1941 (styled 'Precentor of His Majesty's Chapels Royal')
- James Edgar Sheppard 1884–1921
- Francis Garden 1859–1884
- Charles Wesley 1847–1859
- John Sleath 1833–1847
- William Holmes 1803–1833
- Thomas Pearce 1792–1803
- Anselm Bayly 1764–1792
- Fifield Allen 1751–1764
- Edward Pordage 1746–1751
- George Carleton 1732–1746
- Edward Aspinwall 1717–1732
- John Dolben 1712–1717
- Ralph Battell 1689–1712
- William Holder 1674–1689
- Richard Colebrand 1672–1674
- Walter Jones 1661–1672

Interregnum (1649-1660)

- Stephen Boughton 1623–1649
- Leonard Davies 1593–1623
- Anthony Anderson 1592–1593
- Robert Greene 1584–1592
- Richard Tirwitt 1569–1584
- William Gravesend 1568–1569
- John Norrice 1567–1568
- John Angell 1559–1567
- Edmund Danyell 1557–1559
- Emery Tuckfield 1548–1557
- John Donne 1546–1548
- Richard Wade 1526–1546
- Roger Norton 1513–1526
- John Kyte 1509–1513
- Richard Surland 1486–1509
- Nicholas Hewys 1483–1486

== Bibliography ==
- Baldwin, David (1990). The Chapel Royal: Ancient and Modern. London: Gerald Duckworth & Co. Ltd.
- Sheppard, Edgar (1894). Memorials of St James's Palace. London: Longmans, Green and Co.

== See also ==
- Dean of the Chapels Royal
- Ecclesiastical Household
