= Deputy Clerk of the Closet =

Domestic Chaplain to the Sovereign of the UK

The Deputy Clerk of the Closet is deputy for the Clerk of the Closet, an office in the Ecclesiastical Household of the Monarch of the United Kingdom. Since 1931, the Deputy Clerk has also served as Sub-Dean of the Chapels Royal, Sub-Almoner and Domestic Chaplain (Buckingham Palace). The Deputy Clerk is the only full-time clerical member of the Royal Household.

The office of Deputy Clerk was created in 1677. From 1746 until 1903 there were three Deputy Clerks, who each served in turn (four months at a time). In 1894 the then Clerk of the Closet, Randall Davidson, observed that the post of Deputy Clerk was 'now very much a sinecure', not least because Queen Victoria had insisted that the Clerk himself be present when new Bishops did homage (a task previously undertaken by the Deputy Clerk in Waiting). In 1903 Edgar Sheppard, already in office (since 1884) as Sub-Dean of the Chapels Royal and (since 1899) as Sub-Almoner, was additionally appointed to serve as one of the three Deputy Clerks. Another of the three, W. R. Jolley, died in 1907 and he was not replaced; nor was Sheppard himself when he died in 1921. That left just one Deputy remaining (J. N. Dalton); following his death, in 1931, the Sub-Dean (or 'Precentor') of the Chapels Royal took on the role.

== List of Deputy Clerks of the Closet ==
- Paul Wright 2015 – present
- Bill Scott 2007–2015
- William James Booth 1991–2007
- Anthony Douglass Caesar 1979–1991
- James Seymour Denis Mansel 1965–1979
- Maurice Frederic Foxell 1948–1965
- Wallace Harold Elliott 1941–1948
- Launcelot Percival 1931–1941
- James Edgar Sheppard 1903–1921
- John Neale Dalton 1897–1931
- Frederic William Farrar 1894–1903
- George Prothero 1892–1894
- William Rowe Jolley 1886–1907
- Charles John Vaughan 1882–1897
- Hugh Pearson 1881–1882
- Thomas James Rowsell 1879–1892
- Joseph Barber Lightfoot 1875–1879 (afterwards Bishop of Durham)
- Arthur Penrhyn Stanley 1863−1881
- Lord Wriothesley Russell 1850–1886
- The Hon. Edward Southwell Keppel 1841–1875
- John Vane 1839–1863
- Thomas Vowler Short 1837–1841 (afterwards Bishop of Sodor and Man and then Bishop of St Asaph)
- George Davys, Dean of Chester, 1837–1839 (afterwards Bishop of Peterborough)
- Timothy Fysh Foord-Bowes 1834–1837
- John Merewether, Dean of Hereford, 1833–1850
- Frederick-William Blomberg 1827–1837
- Charles Richard Sumner 1824–1826 (afterwards Bishop of Llandaff)
- Robert James Carr 1821–1824(afterwards Bishop of Chichester)
- James Stanier Clarke 1816–1834
- Thomas Hughes 1808–1833
- William Cookson 1805–1820
- Edward Legge 1803–1805 (later Bishop of Oxford)
- Charles Moss 1800–1806 (afterwards Bishop of Oxford)
- Henry Majendie 1794–1800 (afterwards Bishop of Chester)
- William Arnald 1782–1787
- John Fisher 1781–1785
- William Buller 1764–1793 (afterwards Bishop of Exeter)
- Newton Ogle 1762–1781
- Charles Poyntz (1761–1808)
- Hon Frederick Keppel 1759–1762 (afterwards Bishop of Exeter)
- Edward Townshend 1748–1758
- Jonathan Shipley 1750–1760 (afterwards Dean of Winchester)
- Lord James Beauclerk 1745–1748 (afterwards Bishop of Hereford)
- John Head 1745–1760
- Robert Hay Drummond 1741–1748 (afterwards Bishop of St Asaph)
- Alured Clarke, Dean of Exeter 1734–1742
- Charles Naylor 1726–1738
- John Gilbert 1723–1738 (afterwards Bishop of Llandaff. Clerk of the Closet 1752–57)
- Gilbert Burnet 1723–1726
- Henry Egerton 1719–1723 (afterwards Bishop of Hereford. Clerk of the Closet 1735–46)
- ---? Talbot 1718–1723
- ---? Torriano 1716–1718
- William Wake 1689–
- J. Montague 1684–
- Nathaniel Crew 1667–

== Bibliography ==
- Bickersteth, John; Dunning, Robert W. (1991). Clerks of the Closet in the Royal Household: Five Hundred Years of Service to the Crown. Stroud, Gloucestershire Wolfeboro Falls, NH: Alan Sutton Publishing. ISBN 978-0-86299-873-8. OCLC 28115550.
