= Queen Elizabeth II Platinum Jubilee Processional Cross =

Ceremonial cross in the United Kingdom

The Queen Elizabeth II Platinum Jubilee Processional Cross is a ceremonial cross commissioned as a gift for Queen Elizabeth II in celebration of her Platinum Jubilee in 2022. The Cross is used at religious services and state occasions, including at the cenotaph, and replaced the previous cross in the Chapel Royal, St. James's Palace, London.

== Design ==
The Cross was designed and handcrafted by royal warrant holders, along with master gold and silversmiths, Thomas Lyte. The Cross is a contemporary design, incorporating traditional Christian symbolism, inspired by Elizabeth's wedding dress.

Seen on the cross are the flowers of the home nations, a feature of Elizabeth's coronation bouquet. England is represented by orchids and lilies of the valley, and Scotland by stephanotis. Welsh orchids and carnations referring to Northern Ireland are included – with carnations for the Isle of Man. Each flower was shaped and silver-soldered by hand, and the result is a reflection of Her Late Majesty's wedding dress.

The centre of the cross displays the christogram ‘IHS’ device, a monogram and a Latin acronym for Jesus Hominum Salvator, meaning "Jesus Saviour of Mankind." The purpose of this element is to reflect the Queen's dedication to the Church of England.

== Construction ==
Artist Joey Richardson contributed to the detailing of the piece, making the shaft from selected and repurposed oak from the Queen's estate in Sandringham. After turning, the shaft was embellished using pyrography and hand painting to depict the home nations with the Tudor rose, daffodils, shamrocks, and thistles.

The cross is made from 2.8 kg of sterling silver, 24-carat gold plate and 70 diamond lozenges representing the Queen's 70-year reign. It took nearly 400 crafting hours to make and involved every aspect of silversmithing; from modern methodology to processes dating to antiquity.

A blend of traditional and modern artistic techniques, the cross was crafted using specialist techniques, reflecting the highest standards of British craftsmanship.

== Presentation ==
In 2019, Reverend Canon Paul Wright, the Sub-Dean of the Chapel Royal, approached Thomas Lyte and the Royal Warrant Holders Association with a brief to design and create a processional cross. The intention of the design was to fit seamlessly into the interior aesthetic of the Chapel Royal at St. James' Palace.

The Royal Warrant Holders Association (RWHA) launched an appeal to its 700-plus member companies to fund the manufacture of the Cross, which raised almost a quarter of a million pounds for distribution to local charities across the UK through the RWHA's Charity Fund in the Platinum Jubilee year and beyond.

The piece was presented in person to the Queen by the Royal Warrant Holders Association, and Thomas Lyte's CEO and founder, Kevin Baker.
