= Thornhill, West Yorkshire =

Village in West Yorkshire, England

Coordinates: 53.6622°N 1.6124°W

Thornhill
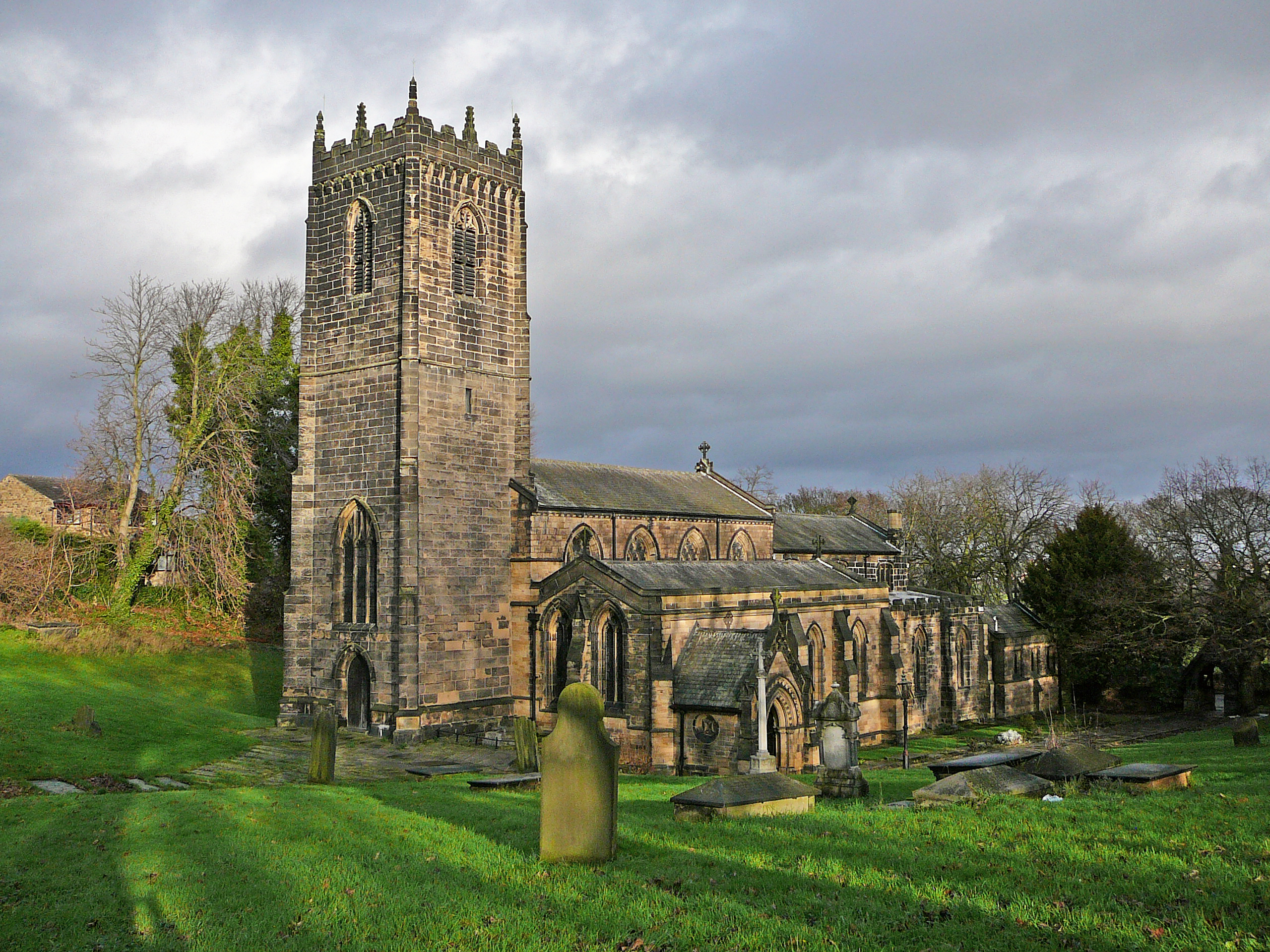
- St Michael and All Angels, Thornhill Parish Church

- Location within West Yorkshire
- Population: 6,875 (2005)
- OS grid reference: SE245185
- Metropolitan borough: Kirklees
- Metropolitan county: West Yorkshire
- Region: Yorkshire and the Humber
- Country: England
- Sovereign state: United Kingdom
- Post town: DEWSBURY
- Postcode district: WF12
- Dialling code: 01924
- Police: West Yorkshire
- Fire: West Yorkshire
- Ambulance: Yorkshire
- UK Parliament: Dewsbury and Batley

Thornhill is a village on the southern outskirts of Dewsbury in Kirklees, West Yorkshire, England. Historically part of the West Riding of Yorkshire, Thornhill was absorbed into Dewsbury County Borough in 1910. The village is located on a ridge on the south side of the River Calder. Dewsbury, Ossett and Wakefield are close by. Its parish church houses a collection of Anglo-Saxon crosses.

== History ==
Anglian crosses and other remains indicate that there was a settlement here by the 9th century. A hoard of 27 Roman denarii found in Turnip Lane and pottery at the cross indicate a substantially earlier settlement. The tombstone of a high-ranking Anglian, Osberht, was found in the graveyard of Thornhill Parish Church. Some historians claim that the grave bearing the name Osbehrt is that of Osberht of Northumbria, who was killed on 21 March 867 while fighting the Viking Great Heathen Army led by Ivar the Boneless. The gravestone, among other contemporaneous high-status Anglian gravestones, is displayed in the church.

Local place-names, Ludd Well (shown on a 1602 map) and the Combs indicate Celtic settlement. This is reinforced by the dedication of the Parish Church to St Michael, which is typical for churches in high places in formerly Celtic parts of northern England. The Celtic kingdom of Elmet that covered parts of modern West Yorkshire collapsed in AD 617.

Thornhill is mentioned in the Domesday Book of 1086 as within the ancient wapentake of Agbrigg. In 1320 Edward II granted a charter for a market and a fair.

Coat of arms of the Thornhill family

In the reign of Henry III, Thornhill Hall was the seat of the Thornhill family, who intermarried with the De Fixbys and Babthorpes in the reigns of Edward I and Edward II. In the reign of Edward III, Elizabeth Thornhill, the only child of Simon Thornhill, married Sir Henry Savile. This extinguished the family line of Thornhills of Thornhill which passed its property down the Savile line and Thornhill became the seat of the Savile family. The Saviles intermarried with the Calverley family so that when Sir John Savile died in 1503 in Thornhill, he left provision in his will for his sister Alice, married to Sir William Calverley. Sir William Savile, the third baronet of the family, fortified the hall.

=== Thornhill Hall ===
The Saviles remained here until the English Civil War when Thornhill Hall was besieged. A royalist heroine after the siege of Sheffield Castle in 1644, Lady Anne Savile's troops under Capt Thomas Paulden (brother of William Paulden) defended the hall against the Parliamentary forces under Col Sir Thomas Fairfax in August 1648. They were forced to surrender and the hall was destroyed. Some ruins of the hall and the moat remain in Rectory Park. The moat retains water.

The Old Rectory survived and was home to several vicars, notably John Michell, who rose to international prominence by developing an understanding of earthquakes, then devised an experiment to accurately determine the mass of planet Earth, but perhaps most intriguingly, attracted Benjamin Franklin (founding father of the USA), Joseph Priestley, Jan Ingenhousz, John Smeaton and others to a scientific meeting and overnight stay in 1771. Benjamin Franklin's stay in Thornhill remained unknown until 2015.

Monuments to members of the Thornhill and Savile families are in Thornhill Parish Church.

=== Industrial Revolution ===
Thornhill has close ties to coal mining. The demand for coal increased due to the development of the steam engine. The local population increased as more workers were recruited for the mines. In 1893 an explosion at Combs Pit killed 139 coal miners. Thornhill Colliery resulted from the merging of Inghams and Combs Collieries in 1948 but closed in 1971.

== Governance ==
Historically Thornhill (St Michael) was a large ecclesiastical parish and township in the wapentake of Agbrigg, West Riding of Yorkshire which joined the Dewsbury Poor Law Union in 1837. In 1894 Thornhill became an urban district. The district contained the civil parishes of Thornhill and Whitley Lower. In 1910 it was abolished and merged with Dewsbury County Borough. On 1 April 1925 the parish was abolished and merged with Dewsbury. In 1921 the parish had a population of 11,722.

== Geography ==
Thornhill is situated on a flat-topped ridge to the south and east of the River Calder and the Calder and Hebble Navigation and north of the Howroyd Beck. The township covered 2,486 acres (1,006 ha) and the underlying rock comprises coal measures. Thornhill encompasses the areas of Thornhill Lees in the valley by the Calder and the Calder and Hebble Navigation, Thornhill Edge, the Edge from the Old English ecg an escarpment the south-facing scarp slope that overlooks the valley of the Howroyd Beck; Overthorpe, from uferra and þorp was the upper outlying farmstead, now a residential area; and Fox Royd.

== Schools ==
The Grade II listed former Thornhill Grammar School was built with money bequeathed by Charles Greenwood, Rector of Thornhill in 1643. A school endowed by Richard Walker dated from 1712.

Thornhill has two primary schools: Overthorpe (C of E) Junior and Infants and Thornhill Junior and Infants School. Thornhill Community Academy, the area's secondary school had a GCSE pass rate of 84% in 2010, an increase of 22 percentage points from 2009. The school is a Science College. Much of the school has been refurbished and modernised. Construction of a sports hall was completed in April 2007 and includes a new Multi-Use Games Area.

== Sports ==
Thornhill Trojans rugby league team play (2023) in the National Conference League Division 1. Overthorpe Sports football team play in the West Riding County Amateur League (Premier Division) on Saturdays and Overthorpe Town play in the Heavy Woollen Sunday League (First Division). Thornhill United play at Rectory Park. Thornhill Rugby Club is based in Overthorpe Parks. Community facilities open to the public include a football pitch, rugby pitch and basketball court, a mini rugby pitch frequently used by the rugby club for the under tens junior team and a sports hall with a multi-use games area are at the local secondary school (the Community Science College at Thornhill).

The Savile Bowmen archery club shoots at Thornhill Cricket and Bowls Club. Three tennis courts are situated next to Thornhill Cricket and Bowls Club. Thornhill Tennis Club has two teams in the Huddersfield and District Tennis League.

== Amenities ==
There are a number of local shops and off-licences in Thornhill and numerous takeaways ranging from traditional English to Italian cuisine. The nearest large supermarkets are in Dewsbury, which is connected by public transport. The area has two post offices with limited services. Overthorpe Post Office has recently undergone building work and is now part of the Onestop franchise. Other shops and services include a florist, dental surgery, beauty salon, a computer repair shop, a tattoo studio, a fish and chip shop and a couple of Indian takeaways.

== Survey of English Dialects site ==
The area was covered by the Survey of English Dialects in the belief that it was a hotbed of Yorkshire dialect. A 2005 study compared the 1964 Thornhill recording with a recording from nearby Ossett in 1999.

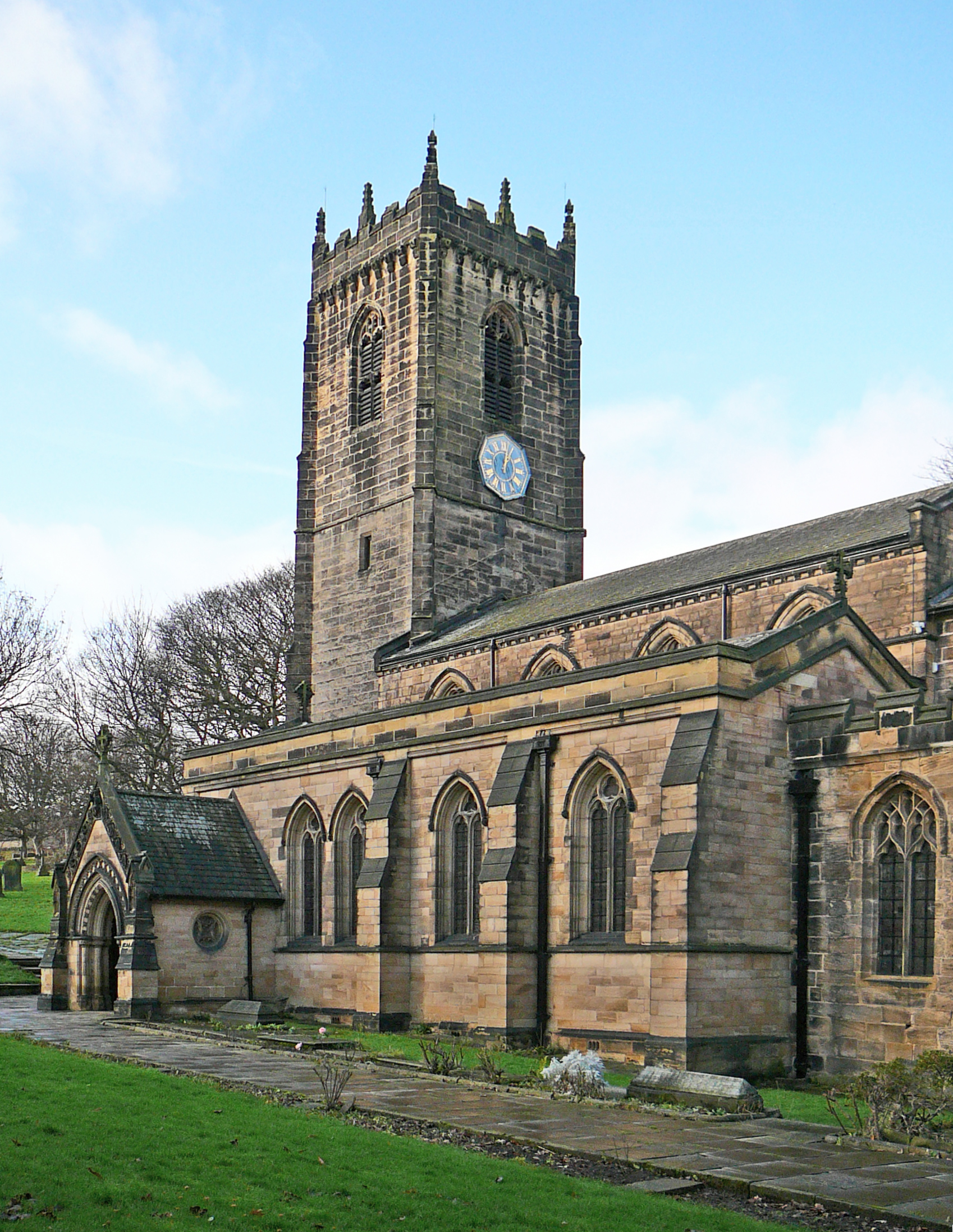
St Michael and All Angels

== Notable people ==
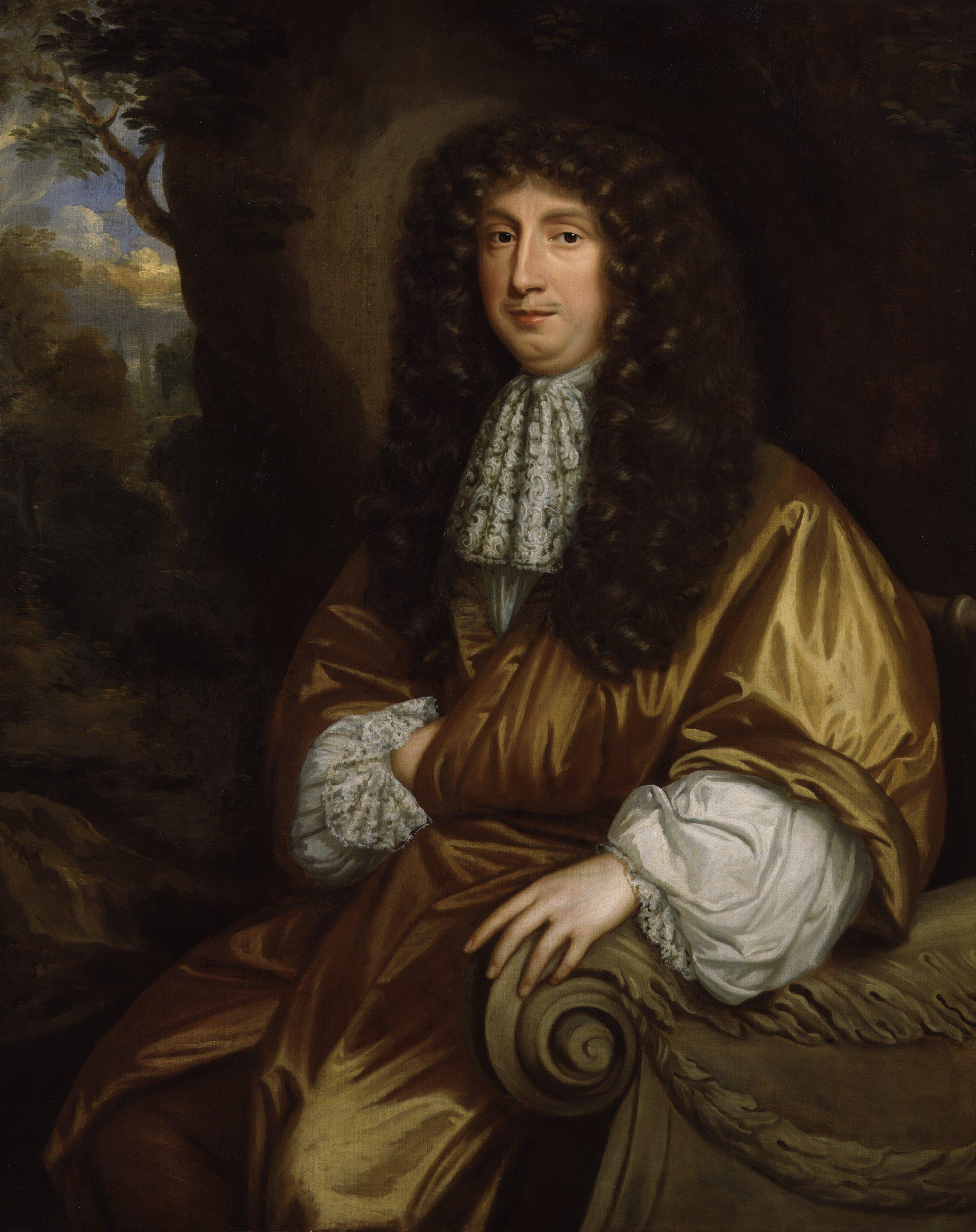
George Savile, 1st Marquess of Halifax. c. 1675

- John Rudd (1498–1579), cartographer and Rector of Thornhill
- Christopher Saxton (c. 1540–c. 1610), cartographer and apprentice to John Rudd
- Sir George Radcliffe (1599–1657), politician and lawyer, born in Thornhill.
- Sir William Savile, 3rd Baronet (1612–1644), politician and soldier, born in Thornhill
- George Savile, 1st Marquess of Halifax (1633–1695), statesman and writer, born in Thornhill.
- John Michell (1724–1793), geologist, astronomer and Rector of Thornhill.
- Sir Francis Sykes, 1st Baronet (1732–1804), East India Company "Nabob" and politician, born in Thornhill
- John Baines (1787–1838), mathematician taught at Thornhill Grammar School
- Barron Kilner (1852–1922), rugby union international and a Mayor of Wakefield, born in Thornhill
- Christopher Brooke (1869–1948) soldier and Conservative MP for Pontefract
- Edward J. Thomas (1869–1958) classicist, librarian and writer on the history of Buddhism.
- Hector Munro Chadwick (1870–1947), philologist and historian, born in Thornhill
- Alex Smith (born 1947) a former footballer with over 350 club caps

== See also ==
- Listed buildings in Dewsbury
