= William Booth (priest) =

The Reverend Prebendary William Booth
- Deputy Clerk of the Closet and Sub-Dean of the Chapel Royal
- Church: Church of Ireland; Church of England
- Diocese: Ecclesiastical Household
- In office: 1991–2007
- Predecessor: Anthony Caesar
- Successor: William Scott

Orders
- Ordination: 1962 (deacon); 1963 (priest) by Bishop Mitchell

Personal details
- Born: William James Booth; 3 February 1939 County Antrim, Northern Ireland
- Died: 1 June 2009 (aged 70) Oxford, England
- Denomination: Anglicanism
- Parents: William James Booth (father)
- Profession: Clergyman
- Education: Trinity College, Dublin (MA)

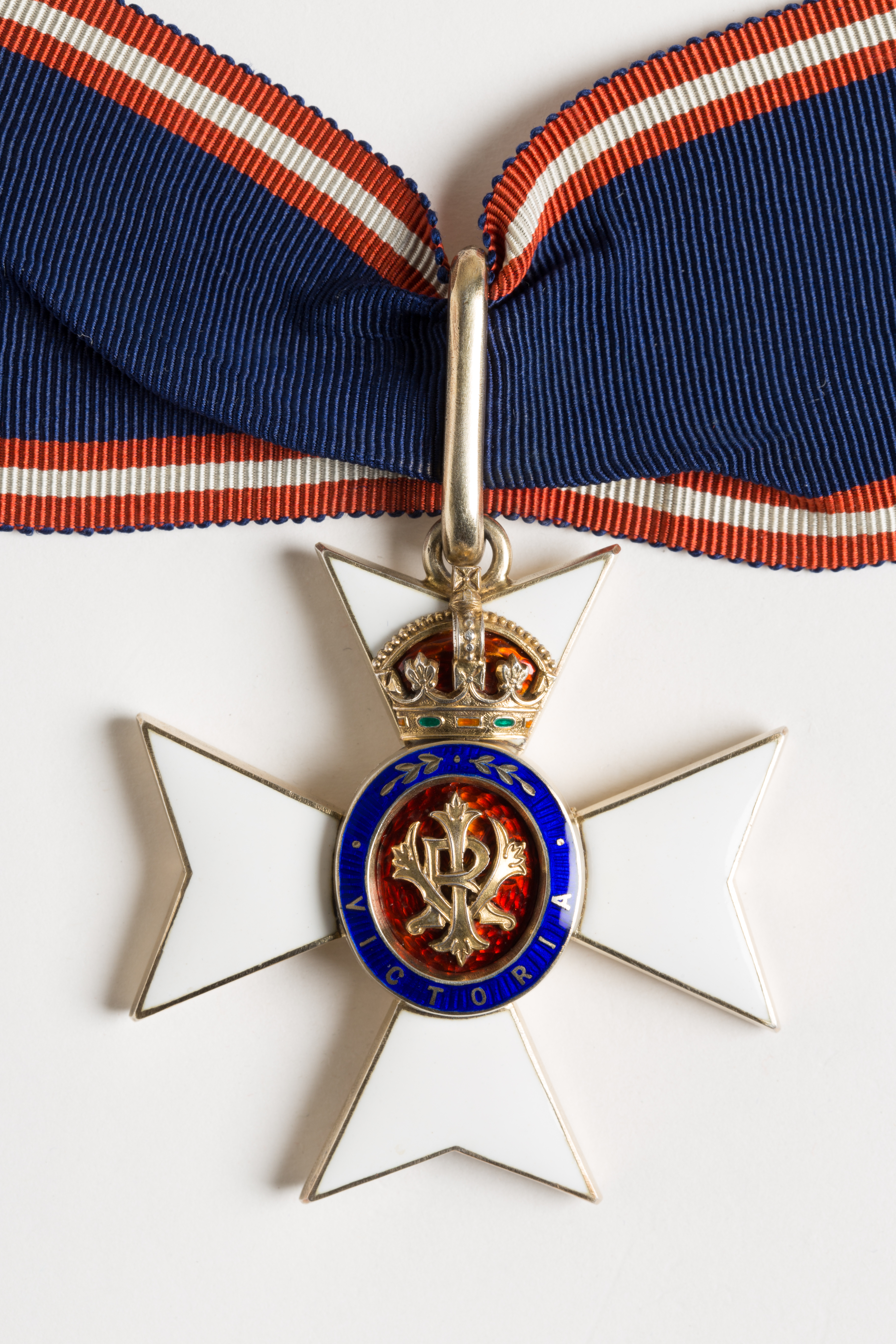
CVO insignia

William James Booth CVO (3 February 1939 – 2 June 2009), was an Anglican priest and prebendary of St Paul's Cathedral, London, who served as royal domestic chaplain to Elizabeth II.

== Early life ==
A descendant of Revd Canon Humphrey Booth (1629–1691), of Dublin (see Gore-Booth), he was born in 1939 and educated at Ballymena Academy, County Antrim, before going to Trinity College, Dublin, where he graduated Bachelor of Arts (BA, 1960) proceeding Master of Arts (MA, 1975).

== Ministry ==
Booth was ordained a deacon in the Church of Ireland in 1962 and a priest in 1963. His first appointment was as curate at St Luke's Parish Church, Belfast, from 1962 to 1964. From 1965 to 1974 he was chaplain of Cranleigh School in Surrey and from 1974 to 1991 he was chaplain of Westminster School.

Appointed Deputy Clerk of the Closet in 1991, Booth served ex-officio as Sub-Dean of the Chapel Royal, Sub-Almoner and, as Domestic Chaplain to Queen Elizabeth II, the sole full-time member of the British Royal Ecclesiastical Household. Previously a Priest-Vicar of Westminster Abbey (1987–1993) and Priest-in-Ordinary to HM The Queen (1976–1993), he was installed as a Prebendary of St Paul's Cathedral in 2000.

After 16 years' service, Booth retired from the Chapel Royal in March 2007; appointed LVO in 1999, he was promoted Commander of the Royal Victorian Order on 5 March 2007. A reception to mark his retirement was held at Buckingham Palace on 26 March 2007.

Acting Chaplain of New College, Oxford, from January to June 2009 as well as Club Chaplain of the East India Club, London, he died at Oxford on 2 June 2009. Prebendary Booth's funeral took place at the Queen's Chapel, St James' Palace, on 17 June 2009 with a memorial service being held at St Margaret's, Westminster, shortly afterwards.

== See also ==
- Booth family
- Royal Households of the United Kingdom

Court offices
Preceded by Canon; Anthony Caesar	Deputy Clerk of the Closet and Sub-Dean of the Chapel Royal; 1991–2007	Succeeded by Prebendary; William Scott
