= John Baines (mathematician) =

English mathematician

John Baines (1787–1838), was an English mathematician.

Baines was born in the parish of Horbury, Yorkshire, in 1787. From 1810 at least, he sent mathematical contributions to periodicals, including Ladies' Diary, the Gentleman's Diary, the York Miscellany, and other similar periodicals, which were noted for their geometrical and algebraic problems. He wrote to the Northern Star from Nottingham. The Ladies' Diary for 1833 carried a more substantial article on Georges Cuvier's Theory of the Earth, written to prove its confirmation of the Mosaic account.

Bains showed an inclination to mathematics from his youth. In his latter years was a well-known correspondent. His teaching career took him from Horbury Bridge (c.1810–1813) to Reading (c.1816) as a mathematics master, then to Nottingham (c.1818), Dewsbury (c.1819), and finally (c.1829) Thornhill, West Riding of Yorkshire. He served nine years as master of Thornhill Grammar School.

From the Latin inscription on his tombstone in Horbury churchyard he appears to have been also skilled in Latin, Greek, and natural science, especially botany, "in herbis decernendis peritus".

== Works ==
- Baines' contribution to "The Enigmatical entertainer and mathematical associate ..., Issue 1", books.google.co.uk; accessed 11 May 2015.
