= Bill Scott (priest) =

British chaplain (1946–2020)

The Reverend Prebendary Bill Scott
- Deputy Clerk of the Closet and Sub-Dean of the Chapel Royal
- Church: Church of England
- Diocese: Ecclesiastical Household
- In office: 2007–2015
- Predecessor: William Booth
- Successor: Paul Wright

Personal details
- Born: William Sievwright Scott; 1 February 1946
- Died: 17 July 2020 (aged 74)
- Denomination: Anglicanism

William Sievwright Scott CVO (1 February 1946 – 17 July 2020) was an Anglican priest who served within the Ecclesiastical Household of the Queen of the United Kingdom as Domestic Chaplain to Elizabeth II at Buckingham Palace, Deputy Clerk of the Closet, Sub-Almoner, and Sub-Dean of the Chapel Royal. As such, he was the only full-time clerical member of the Royal Household of the United Kingdom.

As Deputy Clerk of the Closet, Scott was responsible for assisting the Clerk of the Closet in advising the Private Secretary to the Sovereign on candidates to fill vacancies in the Roll of Chaplains to the Sovereign. As Sub-Dean of the Chapel Royal, Scott was responsible for providing for the spiritual needs of the Sovereign and for overseeing the daily operations of the Chapel Royal including its choirs and staff of priests. As Sub-Almoner, Scott was responsible for the daily operations of the Royal Almonry, the alms giving office of the Royal Household. Among other functions, the Royal Almonry oversees the annual Royal Maundy Service, in which the Queen distributes small red and white purses of specially minted silver coins to retired pensioners.

Prior to 7 November 2007, Scott served as the Chaplain of The Queen's Chapel of the Savoy and the Chaplain of the Royal Victorian Order. Previously, he had served as Vicar of the well known Anglo-Catholic church of St Mary's Church, Bourne Street, London.

In December 2014, Scott was appointed a Commander of the Royal Victorian Order (CVO) by Elizabeth II.

Scott died on 17 July 2020, at the age of 74.

Court offices
Preceded by William Booth	Deputy Clerk of the Closet; 2007 to 2015	Succeeded by Paul Wright
