= James Mansel =

Revd. Canon James Seymour Denis Mansel KCVO FSA JP, formerly Deputy Clerk of the Closet, Sub-dean of the Chapel Royal, Sub-Almoner, and Domestic Chaplain to Her Majesty the Queen of the United Kingdom 1965–79.

Mansel was born in Leamington on 18 June 1907 and educated at Brighton College and Exeter College, Oxford, where he read French. He spent more than thirty years as a schoolmaster, first at Dulwich College 1934–39 and then at Winchester College 1939–65. In 1941, influenced by the then headmaster, Spencer Leeson, Mansel took holy orders and was successively assistant chaplain, chaplain and, from 1955–62, housemaster at Winchester.

In 1965 he abandoned teaching on being offered the posts of Sub-Dean of HM Chapels Royal, Deputy Clerk of the Closet and Sub-Almoner and Domestic Chaplain to the Queen on the recommendation of Bishop Roger Wilson of Chichester, Clerk of the Closet. Mansel was, in fact, the first full-time Chaplain to the Queen to be appointed.

He was a Canon and Prebendary of Chichester Cathedral from 1971–81 and became Canon Emeritus in 1981.

A Londoner by adoption and affection, Mansel worked as an assistant priest at St Margaret's, Westminster, after retirement from his chaplaincy, and in 1988 was appointed an honorary priest vicar at Westminster Abbey, an office he held until his death on 22 September 1995.
