= Thomas Lyte =

English luxury brand

Thomas Lyte is an English luxury brand specialising in gold and silverware, sporting trophies and objet d'art. The company has designed, made or restored many well known trophies and medals, such as football’s FA Cup, golf’s Ryder Cup, rugby’s 6 Nations and Webb Ellis Rugby World Cup, and the Louis Vuitton America's Cup Challenger Playoff Trophy.

== Royal Warrant Holders ==
In January 2015 Queen Elizabeth II appointed a Royal Warrant to Thomas Lyte as Goldsmiths and Silversmiths. Granted for a five-year period to the firm, with founder Kevin Baker as a grantee, the appointment recognises that Thomas Lyte has been a direct supplier and restorer of silverware to the Royal Household since 2010.

Subsequent to the passing of Queen Elizabeth II, Thomas Lyte were awarded a Royal Warrant as Goldsmiths and Silversmiths to the new King, Charles III, in 2024.

== History and heritage ==
Thomas Lyte was founded by Kevin Baker in 2007.

Its products are designed and created in the company’s London-based gold and silversmith workshops. Thomas Lyte is named after the Lyte Jewel, which was made by miniaturist Nicholas Hilliard.

== Thomas Lyte silverware ==
Below is a list of a number of trophies designed, made or restored at Thomas Lyte's London workshops.

In addition to sports trophies, Thomas Lyte designed and manufactured the Queen Elizabeth II Platinum Jubilee Processional Cross, a gift for Queen Elizabeth II in celebration of her Platinum Jubilee in 2022.

Thomas Lyte also designed, crafted and donated the Baton of Hope, the physical symbol of the UK's largest suicide prevention initiative of the same name.

Trophy	Sport	Process	Year
FA Cup	Football	Designed and made	2011
Webb Ellis Cup	Rugby	Restored	Annually
Louis Vuitton Cup	Sailing	Designed and made	2024
Al Ula Camel Cup	Camel Racing	Designed and made	2023
United Cup	Tennis	Designed and made	2022
Women's Rugby World Cup Trophy	Rugby	Designed and made	2025
AFC Asian Cup	Football	Designed and made	2017
SAFF King's Cup	Football	Designed and made	2024
ATP Finals Trophies (Singles and Doubles)	Tennis	Designed and made	2009
Esports World Cup 'Club Championship' Trophy	Esports	Designed and made	2024
The Hundred Trophies (Mens' and Women's)	Cricket	Designed and made	2021
International League T20 (ILT20) trophy	Cricket	Designed and made	2022
Laver Cup	Tennis	Designed and made	2017
ATP World No.1 Trophies (Singles and Doubles)	Tennis	Designed and made	2009
Women's FA Cup	Football	Designed and made	1997
Egyptian Premier League Shield	Football	Designed and made	2024
Rocket League World Championship Trophy	Esports	Designed and made	2025
Fortnite Global Championship Trophy	Esports	Designed and made	2025
Fortnite Championship Series (FNCS) Pro-Am Trophy	Esports	Designed and made	2025
Youth America's Cup	Sailing	Designed and made	2024
African Football League Trophy	Football	Designed and made	2023
Rocket League Championship Series (RLCS) Birmingham Major Trophy	Esports	Designed and made	2025
ICC T20 World Cup (Women's)	Cricket	Maker	2021
ICC T20 World Cup (Men's)	Cricket	Maker	2021
League of Legends European Championship Trophy (LEC)	Esports	Designed and made	2019
AFC Champions League Elite Trophy	Football	Designed and made	2024
AFC Women's Champions League Trophy	Football	Designed and made	2024
AFC Champions League Two Trophy	Football	Designed and made	2024
SA20 Trophy	Cricket	Designed and made	2022
Billie Jean King Cup	Tennis	Restored	Annually
Six Nations (Men's)	Rugby	Designed and made	2015
EPCR Champions Cup	Rugby	Designed and made	2014
The King Abdulaziz Camel Festival Trophies	Camel Clubs	Designed and made	2019
Women's Scottish Cup	Football	Designed and made	2022
Lions Series Trophy	Rugby	Designed and made	2021
SailGP Trophy	Sailing	Designed and made	2019
FIFAe World Cup	Esports	Designed and made	2018
Six Nations (Women's) Trophy	Rugby	Designed and made	2023
Egyptian WE League Cup	Football	Maker	2022
FIH Men's Hockey World Cup	Hockey	Restored	Annually
SWPL and SWPL2 Trophies	Football	Designed and made	2023
United Rugby Championship (URC) Trophy	Rugby	Designed and made	2022
UEFA eChampions League Trophy	Esports	Designed and made	2019
The FA Community Shield	Football	Maker and Restorer	2016
Ethiopian Premier League Trophy	Football	Maker	2021
ICC World Championship Mace	Cricket	Maker	2021
European Rugby Challenge Cup	Rugby	Designed and made	2014
AFC Women's Asian Cup	Football	Designed and made	2018
FIBA World Cup Trophy	Basketball	Maker	2017
Dubai Crown Prince Endurance Cup	Equestrian	Designed and made	2017
Auld Alliance Trophy	Rugby	Designed and made	2018
Louis Vuitton America’s Cup Challenger Playoffs Trophy	Sailing	Designed and made	2017
SkyBet EFL Trophies	Football	Designed and made	2011
FIM Speedway of Nations Trophy	Speedway	Designed and made	2018
Vitality Blast Trophy	Cricket	Designed and made	2018
National League Trophies (inc. North and South)	Football	Designed and made	2016
Melrose Cup	Rugby	Restored	Annually
Basketball Champions League Trophy	Basketball	Maker	2017
SWPL Sky Sports Cup	Football	Designed and made	2023
CONCACAF Champions League Trophy	Football	Maker	2009
WTA Finals Trophy	Tennis	Maker	2014
Davis Cup	Tennis	Restored	Annually
Ryder Cup	Golf	Restored	Annually
League of Legends Summoner's Cup	Esports	Maker	2012
Copa América Centenario Trophy	Football	Maker	2016
Malta FA Trophy	Football	Designed and made	2016
European Open Trophy	Golf	Restored	Annually
Gauntlet of Polo Trophy	Equestrian	Maker	2019
Lions 1888 Cup	Rugby	Designed and made	2021
British Grand Prix Trophy	Formula One	Restored	2018
FIH Women's Hockey World Cup	Hockey	Designed and made	2018
World Speedway Grand Prix Trophy	Speedway	Designed and made	2018
Elite Ice Hockey League Championship Trophy	Ice Hockey	Designed and made	2019
