= Christopher Saxton =

English cartographer (c. 1540 – c. 1610)

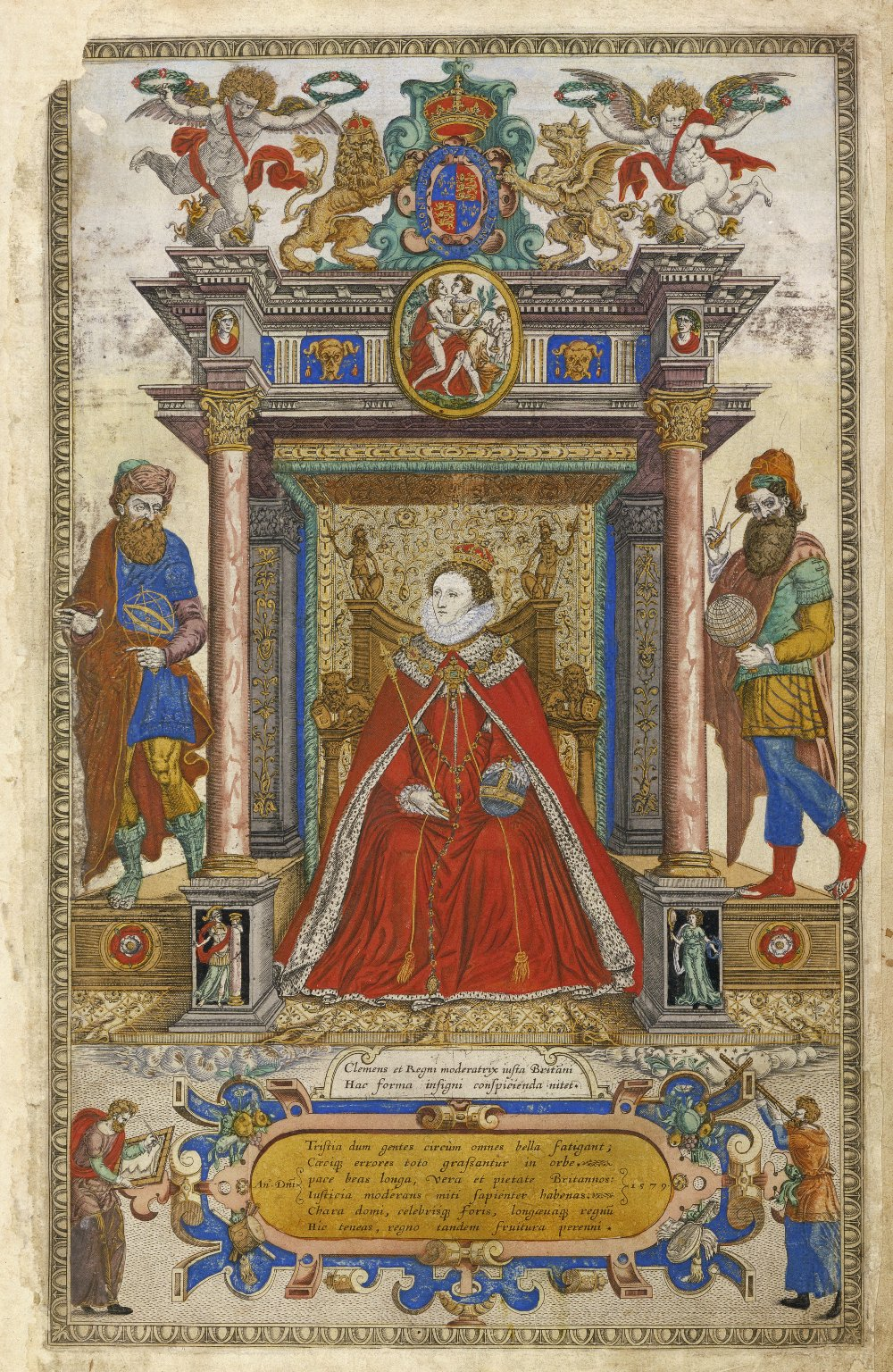
Frontispiece to Saxton's Atlas of the Counties of England and Wales

Christopher Saxton (c. 1540 – c. 1610) was an English cartographer who produced the first county maps of England and Wales.

== Life and family ==
Saxton was probably born in Sowood, Ossett in the parish of Dewsbury, in the West Riding of Yorkshire in either 1542 or 1544. His family subsequently moved to the hamlet of Dunningley near Tingley in the parish of Woodkirk where the Saxton name is recorded in 1567. It is speculated that Saxton may have attended the predecessor school to Queen Elizabeth Grammar School, Wakefield and also speculated that he was a student at Cambridge University but neither is corroborated. It is most likely that John Rudd, the vicar of Dewsbury and Thornhill, a keen cartographer, passed his skills to Saxton.

Saxton married and had three children. Robert, born in 1585, was his father's assistant in 1601 and drew a map of Snapethorpe in Wakefield when it was surveyed by his father. Robert was commissioned to survey Sandal Magna in 1607. Christopher Saxton died in either 1610 or 1611.

== Cartographer ==
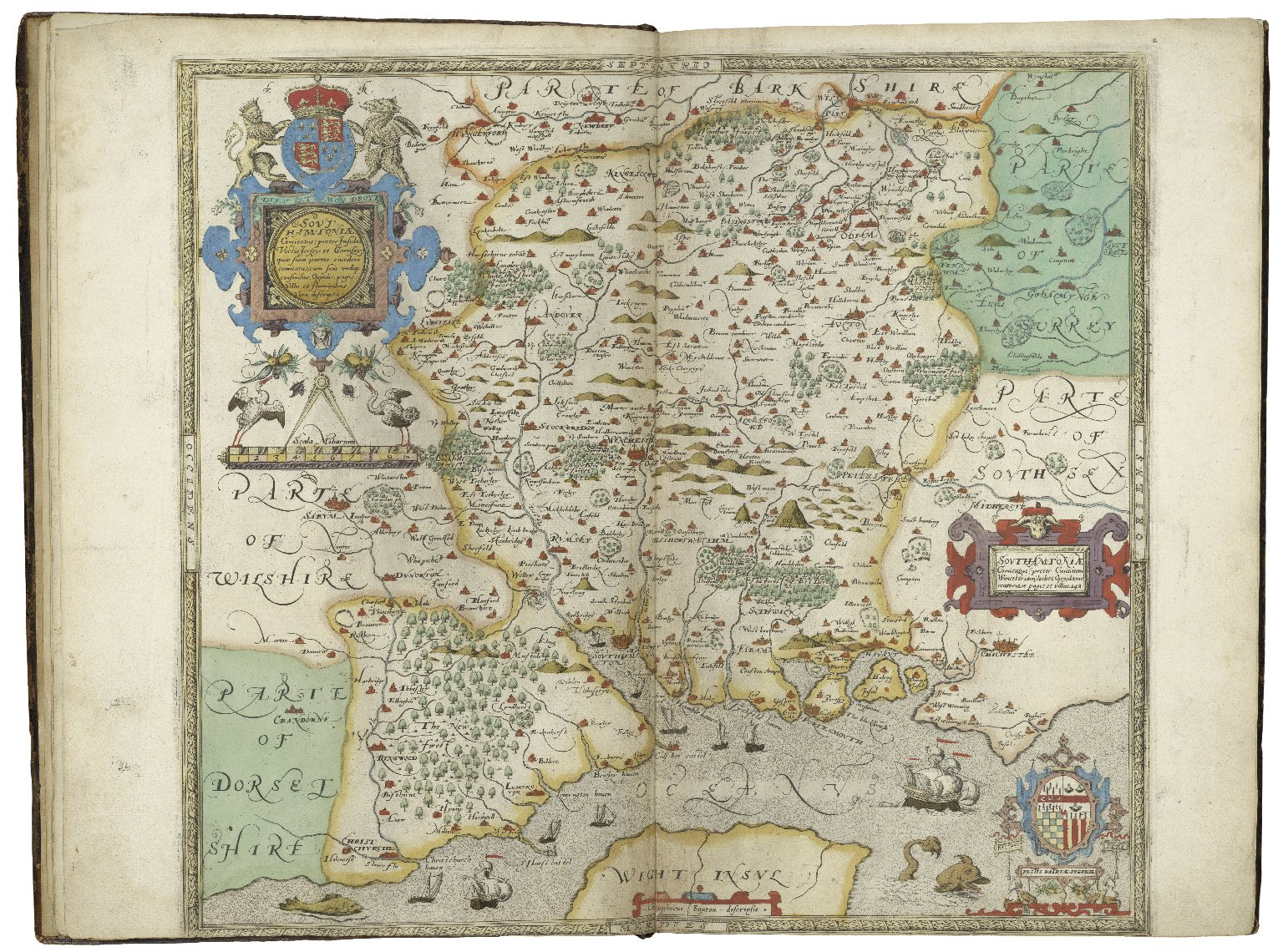
A map of "Southamptonshire" (modern-day Hampshire) from the Atlas of the Counties of England and Wales

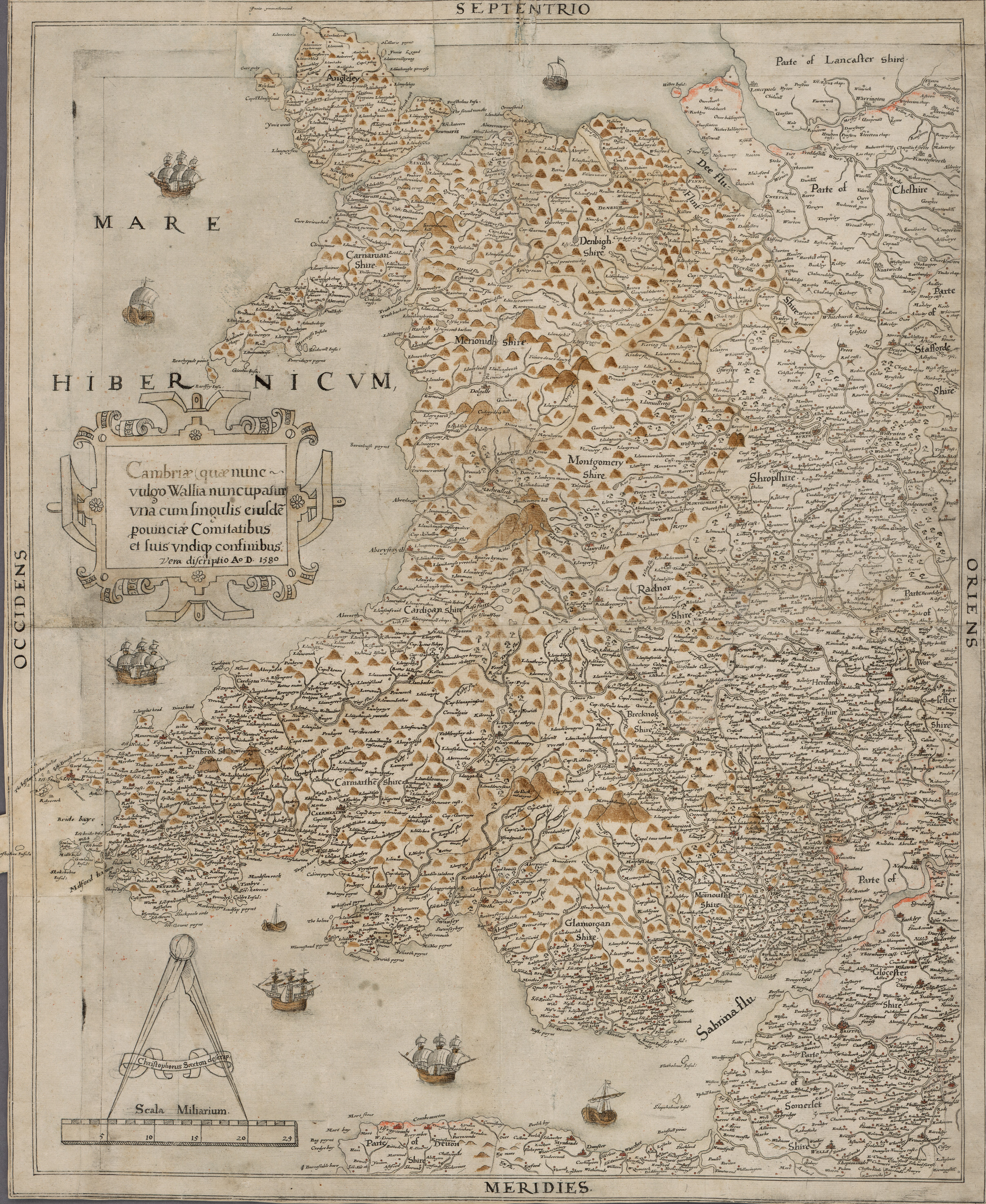
Saxton's unpublished Proof Map of Wales, 1580

Map making became increasingly common in the reign of Elizabeth I, made possible by advances in surveying technology and printing from engraved copper plates. Accurate mapping of the whole country became increasingly important; the Gough Map of the early fourteenth century had (schematic) roads but no administrative divisions. Lord Burghley was instrumental in ensuring that a court official, Thomas Seckford of Woodbridge, Suffolk, financed the commission. In 1574 Saxton began the survey of England. In consideration of the expenses involved, Queen Elizabeth granted him a lease on lands at Grigstone Manor in Suffolk. The Welsh survey began in 1577. Surveying the country was a significant undertaking but the first plates were engraved by 1574 and in 1578 the survey was complete. As the task was finished in a short time-span it is possible that Saxton used some of John Rudd's earlier work. Individual county sheets were issued before the completed survey was issued as an atlas in 1579. The proofs were presented to Lord Burghley who compiled them into an atlas of his own.

The maps were produced in the Atlas of the Counties of England and Wales published in 1579. It contained 35 maps, each bearing the arms of Elizabeth I and Thomas Seckford, Saxton's patron. The maps show hills and mountains but do not provide precise information as to their location or altitude. A variety of symbols show buildings and settlements, but not any roads. All the maps are dated except for Northumberland. Five counties, Cornwall, Essex, Hertfordshire, The Suffolk and Norfolk maps show the division into hundreds. The atlas was a commercial success, prompting other cartographers including John Speed, John Norton, and Michael Drayton to attempt similar enterprises, adding to and adapting Saxton's work.

The maps drawn by Saxton were engraved by Augustine Ryther, Remigius Hogenberg, William Hole, William Kip, Leonard Terwoort of Antwerp, Nicholas Reynold of London, Cornelius Hogius, and Francis Scatter. The engravers were of Dutch or Flemish origin. There is no evidence on the maps that Saxton engraved them himself, but according to one account, he engraved those of the Welsh counties and Herefordshire. Saxton obtained a licence to sell the maps for a term of ten years.

John Dee, warden of the Manchester's collegiate church, employed Saxton to survey Manchester's parish boundaries in 1596 but no copy has survived. Chetham's Library in Manchester has a copy of the atlas, as does the Folger Shakespeare Library in Washington, D.C.

The maps were republished during the English Civil War "in twenty sturdy sheets to be folded as a pocket-map, 'Useful for all Commanders for the Quartering of Soldiers'" (thus becoming known as "the Quartermaster's map").
