= John De la Bere =

15th-century British bishop

John De la Bere (or Delabere) was a 15th-century Bishop of St David's in Wales. He was also the King's Almoner under Henry VI.

De la Bere's parentage is not known for sure, but it is most likely that he was of the family of De la Bere from Stretford Manor in Herefordshire and Weobley Castle in the Lordship of Gower. He may have been a younger son of John De la Bere of Weobley who died in 1433.

He entered the Church and became Dean of Wells before being appointed Bishop of St David's in September 1447. He was consecrated on 12 or 19 November that year. De la Bere may have been an Oxford scholar, and may have never set foot in St David's, leaving the running of the diocese to Gruffydd, the father of Sir Rhys ap Thomas. He is known for refusing to allow his clergy to leave their wives or concubines.

He lived instead in Oxfordshire where he owned the manor of Clifton Hampden. He paid for the restoration of a bridge in Dorchester, which was later removed in around 1780. In 1455, he loaned his palace at Lamphey to the Earl of Richmond for a trip with his newlywed, thirteen-year-old Margaret Beaufort. It was there that, their son, King Henry VII of England, was conceived.

Possibly due to his political affiliations during the Wars of the Roses, De la Bere resigned or was deposed in 1460, and was succeeded by Robert Tully. He is believed to have died in 1462.
