= Frederick Blomberg =

Unconfirmed illegitimate child of King George III

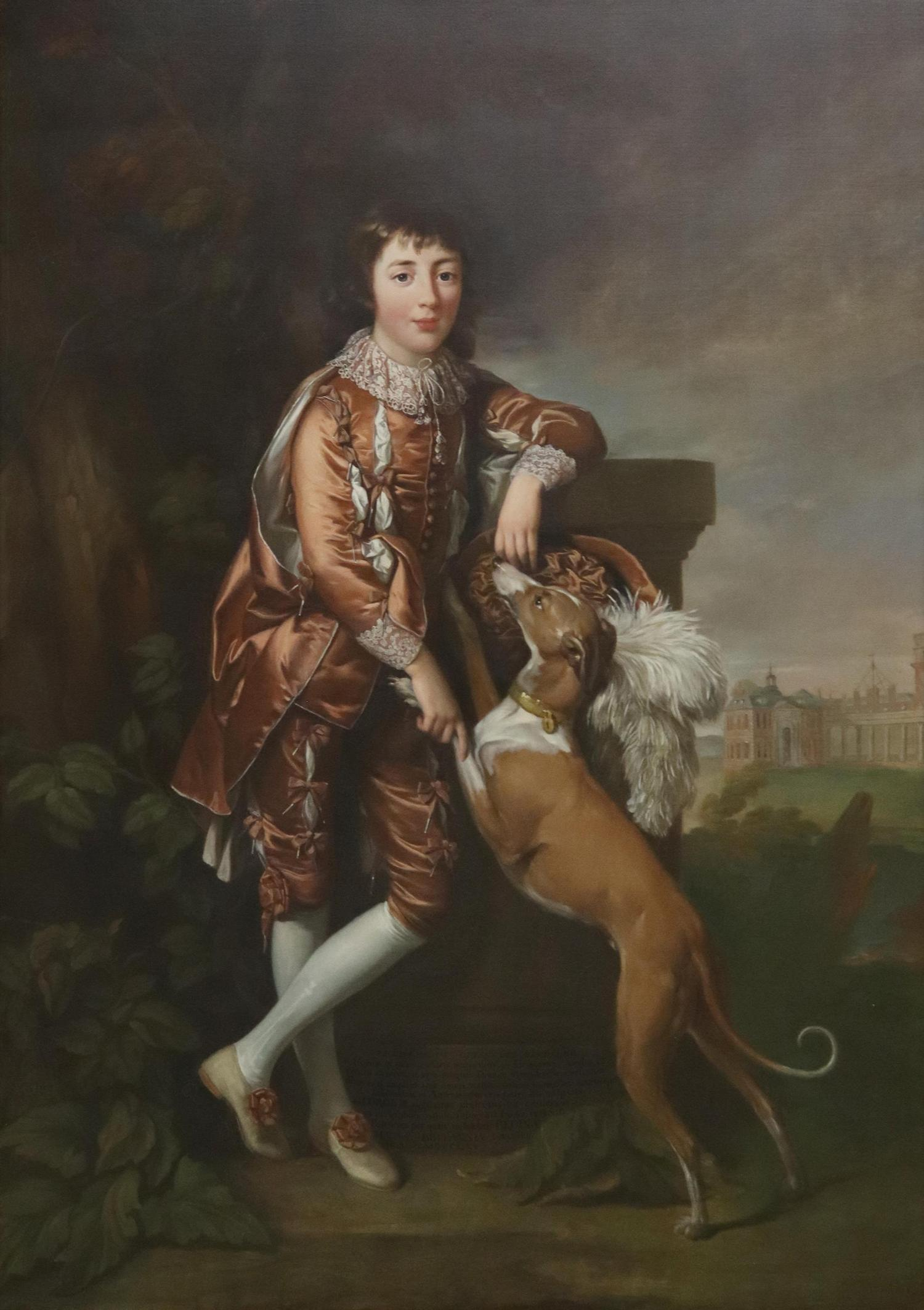
Frederick Blomberg by Richard Brompton

Frederick William (or George-Frederick) Blomberg (1761–1847) was the adopted son and alleged illegitimate child of George III, King of Great Britain and Ireland. Conversely, he was rumoured to have been the illegitimate child of George's brother, Prince Edward, Duke of York and Albany.

Blomberg was known for his close friendship with King George IV to whom he was Chaplain in 1793 when the latter was Prince of Wales and then Clerk of the Closet from 1808. He was later Chaplain to Queen Victoria.

Blomberg was descended from Royal physician Charles Blomberg and Livonian nobleman Baron Karl Johann von Blomberg and was related by marriage to Royal physician Edmund Dickinson.

== Life and work ==
Frederick William Blomberg was baptised in Rochester, Kent, on 22 September 1761, with Lieutenant Frederick and Melissa Blomberg named as parents. According to Frederick's contemporary, T.S. Whalley, following the news of the death of his parents he was sent for by George III and brought up with the King's children.

Northern Notes and Queries questions Whalley's version of Blomberg's childhood, citing a soldier serving with Blomberg's father in Dominica who gave an account of Blomberg's childhood, apparently at Queen's Charlotte's request. Blomberg was an only child whose mother died shortly after his birth. His orphaned state reached the ears of King George III and Queen Charlotte who decided to adopt him. He was later cared for by the royal children's sub-governess, Henrietta Cotesworth, daughter of William Cotesworth of Gateshead Park.

Blomberg enrolled at St John's College, Cambridge University on 7 October 1777 at age 16. He was awarded a BA in 1782, MA in 1785 and D.D. in 1822.

In 1812 as Prince Regent, the later George IV granted the manor of Kirby Misperton (now Flamingo Land Resort) to Blomberg. Frederick lived at Kirby Hall with his family, whilst also spending time at Carlton House. The manor had been in Blomberg's family until 1798 before being escheated to the Crown. Later in 1812 Blomberg erected an obelisk to the King and Regent at Kirby Misperton to commemorate the gift.

In addition to his roles in the Royal Household, Blomberg held various other ecclesiastical roles including Prebendary of Westminster Abbey, Bristol Cathedral and Wells Cathedral, and Canon Residentiary of St Paul's Cathedral; and Rector of Shepton Mallet, Vicar of Bradford-on-Avon and the ‘valuable vicarage’ of St Giles, Cripplegate.

Blomberg's appointments were seen as being enabled by his Royal connections.

Blomberg's main talents were for music. He was described as not being committed to his ecclesiastical duties, the church of the time being a career for a person “who would not inherit a title but needed a good income and somewhere to live”. In 2025 a local newspaper in Somerset reported, “he is best remembered as an eccentric parish priest who used to play his violin in the church of St Peter & St Paul in Shepton Mallet instead of giving sermons. He was frequently seen trotting around the countryside in his carriage which he turned into a mobile music room, playing his beloved violin and delighting everyone who saw him.”

Blomberg died at Cripplegate on 23 March 1847 at age 85. His adopted daughter Anna-Maria, and her husband colonial officer Captain George Newberry, inherited Blomberg's fortune.

== Parentage ==
Blomberg's parents as recorded on his birth certificate were Lieutenant Frederick and Melissa Blomberg. The possibility of Frederick being King George III’s “reputed natural son” has been noted by various historical and modern sources including by his contemporary Whalley, and in Alumni Cantabrigienses (1940) where he studied, Latimer’s Annals of Bristol in the Nineteenth Century (1887) where he worked, by Historic England, the Institute of Historical Research and the BBC. Other sources have suggested Blomberg was the King's nephew, an illegitimate child of Edward, Duke of York.

Published in 1863 the memoirs of TS Whalley, who knew him, stated that Blomberg came to the attention of George III on hearing about the “real ghost story” concerning Blomberg's then late father. On the basis of this story the King sent for him and for him “to be brought up with the young princes”.

In Northern Notes and Queries (1907) it was asserted that the Whalley account was incorrect, publishing a clarifying letter from a lieutenant who served with Blomberg's father. The letter claims that Blomberg's case was brought to Queen Charlotte's attention by one of the royal governesses, Mrs Cotesworth, and that it was the latter who adopted Blomberg and on leaving the royal household took Blomberg to live with her (while financially supported by Queen Chalotte).

In 2023 Blomberg's portrait, made when he was seven in 1769 by Hugh Douglas Hamilton was auctioned and bought by King Charles III for the Royal Collection.

== In popular culture ==
The Blomberg family were the subjects of one of the best-known ghost stories in Britain during Frederick's lifetime, appearing in 1823 in Accredited Ghost Stories as Apparition of Major Blomberg to the Governor.

In 2025 historical fiction book Prince George & Master Frederick by Rosalind Freeborn told Frederick Blomberg's story. The book received media coverage focused on Blomberg's connections to George III.
