= Launcelot Percival =

English priest and rugby union player (1869–1941)

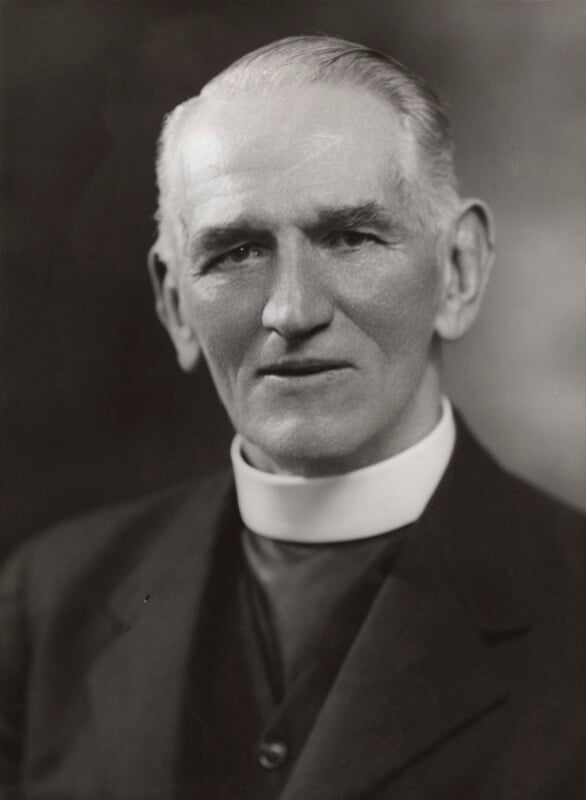
- Percival in 1936
- Born: Launcelot Jefferson Percival; 22 May 1869 Clifton, Bristol, England
- Died: 22 June 1941 (aged 72) Woking, England
- School: Clifton College
- University: Trinity College, Oxford
- Notable relative(s): John Percival, father

Rugby union career
- Position: Forward
Amateur team(s)
Years	Team	Apps	(Points)
1888–1892	Oxford University RFC		
- Rugby
1890–?	Barbarian F.C.		
International career
Years	Team	Apps	(Points)
1891–1893	England	3	(2)

Launcelot Jefferson Percival KVCO (22 May 1869 – 22 June 1941) was an Anglican priest who in addition to various parish posts served in the Ecclesiastical Households of Queen Victoria, King Edward VII, King George V, King Edward VIII and King George VI.

Percival was also a noted sportsman in his early adult life and was an international rugby union forward who played club rugby for Oxford University and Rugby. Percival played international rugby for England and was an original member of invitational team, the Barbarians.

== Personal history ==
Percival was born in Clifton, Bristol in 1869 to John Percival and Louisa Holland. He was educated at Clifton College, of which his father was headmaster. Percival followed his father later in life when he matriculated to Trinity College, Oxford, as after leaving Clifton, John Percival had taken the role of President of Trinity College.

Percival left university with a master's degree and took Holy Orders. By 1899 he was resident chaplain to the Bishop of London, and on 28 February 1899 he was appointed an Honorary Priest in Ordinary to Queen Victoria, his first entry into the monarch's Ecclesiastical Household. By 1905 he was also rector of St James's Church, Fulham and on 3 November he was promoted to Priest in Ordinary to the king. In 1910 he became the rector of St Mary's, Bryanston Square in London. On 6 January 1922 he was appointed Precentor of the Chapel Royal, and on 6 February 1923 domestic chaplain to the king. On 3 March 1924 he was appointed Chaplain of the Venerable Order of Saint John. In 1931 Percival was made Deputy Clerk of the Closet (and sub-almoner), and on 20 July 1936 was reappointed to the post after the accession of Edward VIII and again on 2 March 1937 under George VI after Edward's abdication. In the 1936 New Year Honours he was appointed Knight Commander of the Royal Victorian Order. In 1937 he was appointed Precentor of the Chapel Royal for the second time, this time he held the post until his death in 1941. He was succeeded by Revd Wallace Elliott.

The National Portrait Gallery in London holds two photographs of Percival, both taken in 1931 by one of Alexander Bassano's photographic studios.

== Rugby career ==
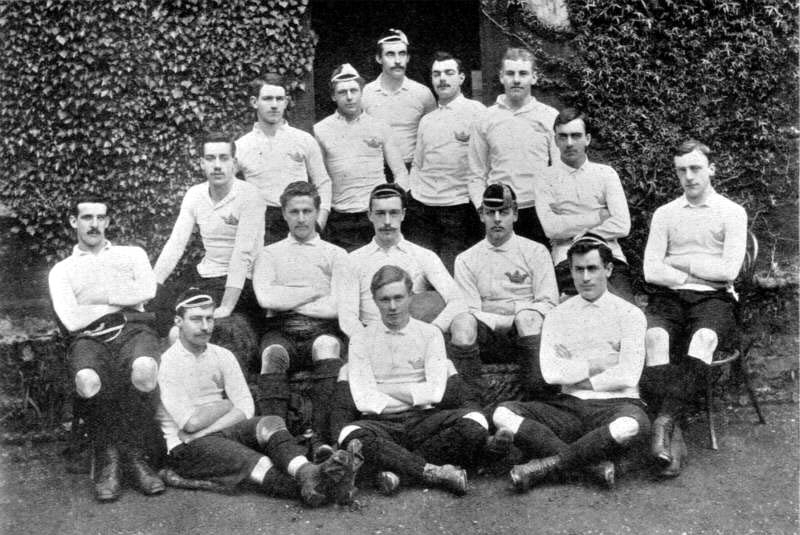
Percival with the 1889 Oxford Varsity team, Percival is standing on the far left on the back row

Percival first came to note as a rugby player when he represented Oxford University whilst studying at Trinity. Although a forward, Percival had a good reputation for scoring tries, mentioned as scoring twice for an invitational priest's team in George William Erskine Russell's 1921 collection of essays Afterthoughts and in the 1891–92 season for Oxford scored a "remarkable try" against Blackheath when he dribbled the ball almost the entire length of the pitch before punting the ball over the opposing fullback to score.

One of Percival's most notable matches for Oxford was the 1889 encounter with the touring New Zealand Native football team. The match was played on 21 February, Oxford winning 6–0.

Percival played in two Varsity Matches against Cambridge University in 1889 and 1891 to win his sporting 'Blues'. His first Varsity game ended in victory, with Oxford winning by a goal and two tries to nil, Percival scoring one of the tries after a scrummage close to the Cambridge line. Percival was absent from the 1890 team, after being forced to stand down after an accident, but returned to the Oxford squad in 1891. Oxford began the 1891 game as favourites, with a very strong forward pack in tremendous form, but lost the match to late Cambridge pressure.

In the 1890/91 season Percival was approached by William Percy Carpmael to join his newly formed invitational team, the Barbarians. In accepting, Percival became one of the founding members of the team. The same season, Percival was first selected for the England national rugby team, brought into the squad as a replacement for Richard Budworth. His debut was against Ireland in the second England encounter of the 1891 Home Nations Championship; the game ended with a comfortable victory for the English team. Despite the win, Percival was replaced for the next game of the tournament, but was called upon again for the 1892 Championship, again against Ireland. The game ended in another win for England, and Percival scored his first and only international points when he scored a try, thanks to some good build up play from Sammy Woods and Frank Evershed. His third and final international game was in 1893, but having left Oxford University he was now representing Rugby at club level. Played against Scotland, Percival was on the losing side with England for the first time, though he became the first player to win a cap playing from Rugby.

Percival played for several seasons for Rugby and was instrumental in bringing in several talented players to the club. In the 1892/93 season, Percival was given the captaincy of the club for one season, replacing T. B. Sparkes.

== Cricket career ==
Percival also played cricket at a high level. He represented both Marylebone Cricket Club and Herefordshire County Cricket Club and in 1895 while representing Herefordshire he was bowled out in both innings by J. T. Hearne.

== Bibliography ==
- Godwin, Terry (1984). The International Rugby Championship 1883–1983. Grafton Street, London: Willow Books. ISBN 0-00-218060-X.
- Griffiths, John (1982). The Book of English International Rugby 1872–1982. London: Willow Books. ISBN 0002180065.
- Marshall, Howard; Jordon, J.P. (1951). Oxford v Cambridge, The Story of the University Rugby Match. London: Clerke & Cockeran.
