= Edgar Sheppard =

English Anglican priest (1845-1921)

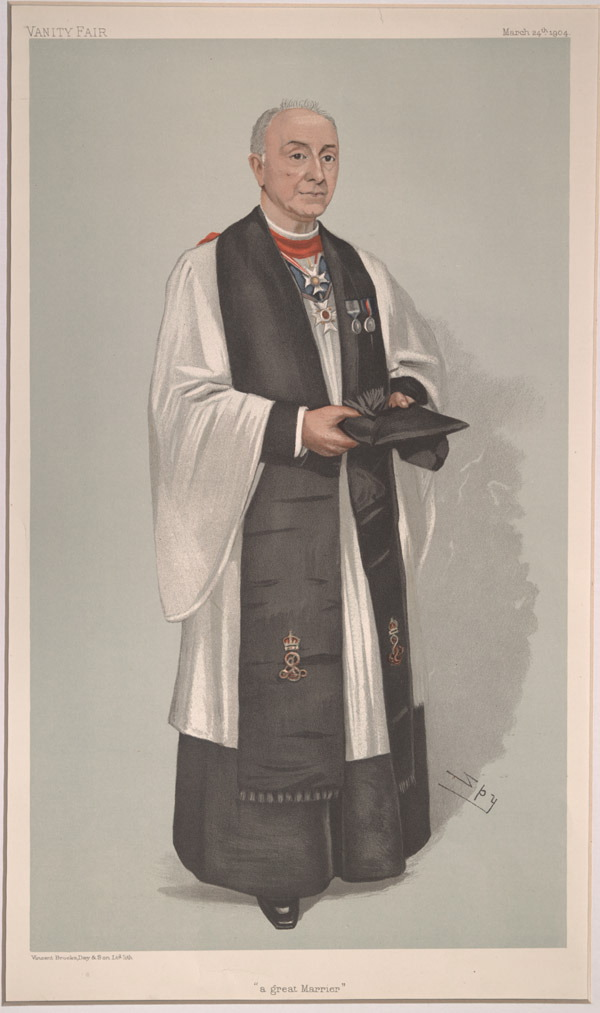
Edgar Sheppard pictured in Vanity Fair on 24 March 1904

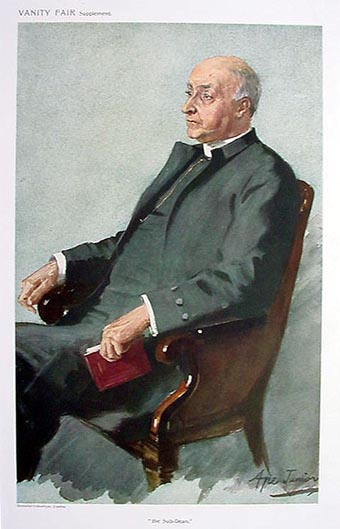
Edgar Sheppard pictured in Vanity Fair on 12 April 1911

Rev. Canon. James Edgar Sheppard KCVO (10 August 1845 – 30 August 1921) was a Canon of Windsor from 1907 to 1921.

== Early life and education ==
Sheppard was born in 1845 in Worcester, the son of Dr Edgar Sheppard, Professor of Psychology at King's College, London, and his wife, Anabel Marmont Sheppard.

He was educated at St John's College, Oxford and graduated in 1873.

== Career ==
He was appointed:

- Minor Canon of Windsor 1878 – 1884
- Priest in ordinary to Queen Victoria 1882 – 1884
- Sub Dean of the Chapels Royal and Chaplain to the Household at St James Palace. 1884
- Chaplain to the Duchess of Cambridge 1885 – 1889
- Hon. Chaplain to Queen Victoria 1886 – 1900; to the Duke of Cambridge 1889 – 1904, and to King Edward VII 1901 – 1909
- Permanent Reader and Chaplain of the Chapel Royal, Whitehall 1886
- Chaplain, Order of St John of Jerusalem 1894
- Deputy Clerk of the Closet 1903 – 1910
- Sub Almoner 1910
- Domestic Chaplain to King George V and Queen Alexandra 1910

As Sub-Dean of the Chapel Royal to King Edward VII, he took part in the Coronation of King Edward VII and Queen Alexandra on 9 August 1902, and was invested as a Commander of the Royal Victorian Order (CVO) two days after the ceremony, on 11 August 1902.

He was appointed to the ninth stall in St George's Chapel, Windsor Castle in 1907, a position he held until 1921. He was awarded KCVO in the 1914 Birthday Honours.

== Personal life ==
He married Mary Peters White, daughter of Richard White of Instow, in 1874, and they had three sons and one daughter. Their eldest son was Edgar Sheppard (b. 26 Jun 1878), served as a Lieutenant and finally a Captain in the 19th Q A O R (Queen Alexandra's Own Royal) Hussars Cavalry. Their second son was Arthur Montagu Sheppard (1879–1882). Their youngest son was Dick Sheppard (1880–1937), who followed his father into the church. Their daughter was Margaret Mary Sheppard (b. circa 1877)
