= John Rudd (cartographer) =

British cartographer and clergyman

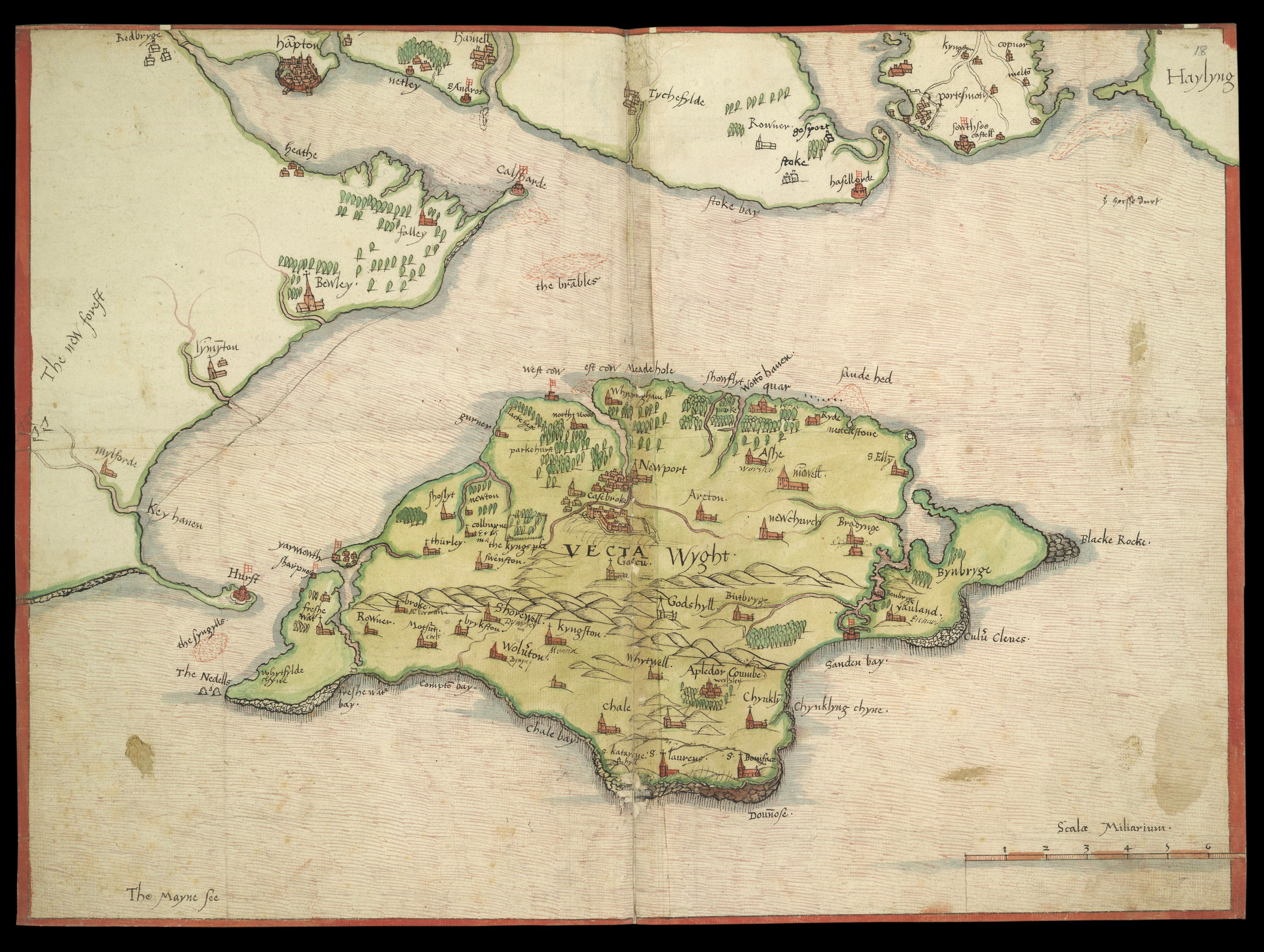
Manuscript map of the Isle of Wight, part of an atlas belonging to William Cecil, 1st Baron Burghley, thought to be by John Rudd.

John Rudd (1498–1579) was a Yorkshire born Tudor cartographer and clergyman of both the Church of England and Catholic Church.

== Biography ==
John Rudd was born in Yorkshire in 1498, with nothing being known about his family background. He attended Clare College, with a BA and MA by 1520. He entered the priesthood in 1521, becoming a fellow at St John's College, Cambridge.

During the Reformation Rudd initially adopted a stridently catholic position, being briefly imprisoned on the orders of Thomas Cromwell because of a sermon that Rudd had given at Paul's Cross, thought to have expressed sympathy with Elizabeth Barton and her followers. To avoid execution he renounced Catholicism and after was allowed to continue to preach.

While imprisoned, Rudd would create his first map, a now lost "Ptolemaic" map of the Holy Land, (Note: "The map, he said, was based on the work of Ptolemy, Pliny, Strabo and Jerome, showed all the places mentioned in the New Testament and many in the Old, and was more accurate than any which had previously been published." (Marcombe 1978, p. 173)) at some point before 1534. (Note: It has been suggested that this is the map that appears in the 1535 Coverdale Bible.) This maps was sent, in exchange for extraditing his release from solitary conferment, to the new Bishop-elect of Chester Rowland Lee. By the 1540s he began to achieve some positions of note in Protestant England, even being nominated Clerk of the Closet.

In 1561, at the request of Elizabeth I he was given two years' leave from his duties as a prebendary of Durham Cathedral, to "travayle by his own sight to view and considere divers parts of our … Realme" with the objective of mapping all of England. Although he does not appear to have completed this objective, it was completed by his apprentice, Christopher Saxton. Saxton was employed by Rudd as a servant, and it seems likely that he accompanied him on these trips, and learned draughting and surveying skills from his master.

While little of Rudd's own work survives, it has been suggested that Mercator's maps of the British Isles, published as Angliae, Scotiae et Hiberniae nova Descripto [...] was, to some extent, based on Rudd's work.

== Family ==
Rudd married Isabel Whildon in 1551. (Note: He briefly renounced her, during the reign of Mary I, as to keep his property and titles in the Counter-Reformed church. He would receive Isabel back after Elizabeth I came to the throne.) Together they had at least three daughters and three sons. John Rudd died in Durham in 1579, being buried in its Cathedral.
