= John Gilbert (archbishop of York) =

Archbishop of York from 1757 to 1761

The Most Reverend and Right Honourable John Gilbert
- Archbishop of York
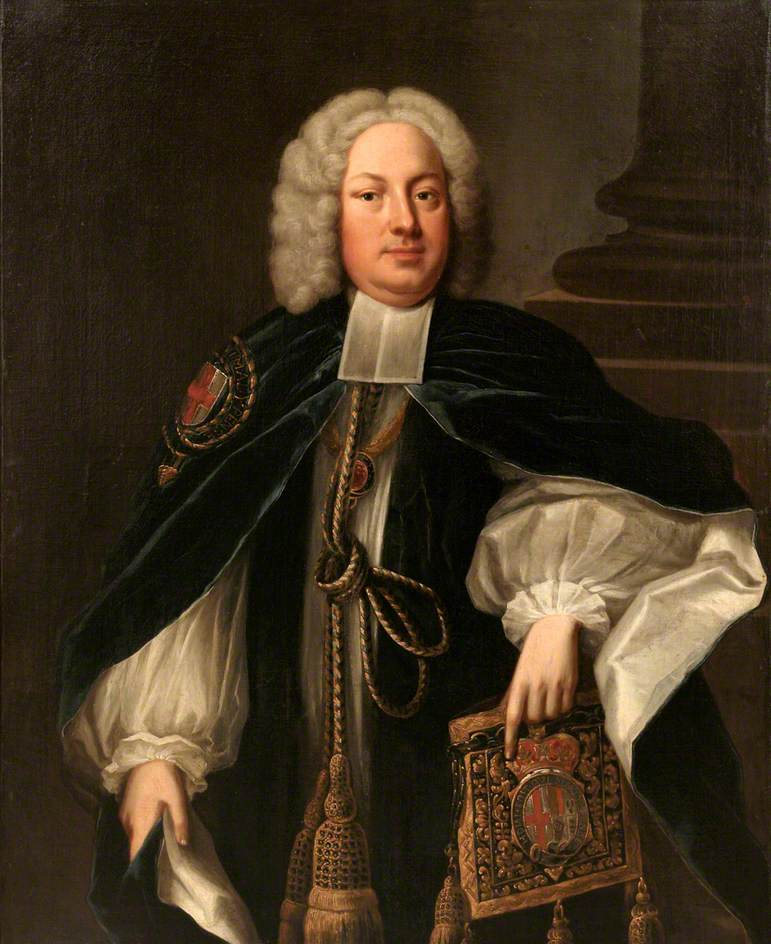
- Portrait by Thomas Hudson
- Province: Province of York
- Diocese: Diocese of York
- In office: 1757–1761 (death)
- Predecessor: Matthew Hutton
- Successor: Robert Hay Drummond
- Other posts: Dean of Exeter (27 December 1726 {elected}–?); Bishop of Llandaff (28 December 1740–1749); Bishop of Salisbury (October 1749–1757); Chancellor of the Order of the Garter (1750–?); Clerk of the Closet (October 1752–?); Lord High Almoner (c. 1757–?)

Personal details
- Born: 18 October 1693
- Died: 9 August 1761 (aged 67) Twickenham, Middlesex, Great Britain
- Buried: Grosvenor Chapel
- Denomination: Anglican
- Parents: John Gilbert & Martha
- Spouse: Margaret Sherard married 2 May 1726 at St James's, Westminster she predeceased him
- Children: Emma Countess of Mount Edgcumbe
- Education: Merchant Taylors' School, City of London
- Alma mater: Magdalen Hall, Oxford; Trinity College, Oxford; Merton College, Oxford

Ordination history of John Gilbert
History
Episcopal consecration
- Date: 28 December 1740

John Gilbert (18 October 1693 – 9 August 1761) was an Anglican clergyman who served as Archbishop of York from 1757 to 1761.

== Early life ==
Gilbert was the son of John Gilbert, fellow of Wadham College, Oxford, vicar of St Andrew's, Plymouth, and prebendary of Exeter, who died in 1722.

He was educated at Merchant Taylors' School. He matriculated at Magdalen Hall, Oxford in July 1711, aged 17, but moved to Trinity College, Oxford, where he graduated BA in 1715. He became a Fellow of Merton College, Oxford in 1716, proceeded MA in February 1718, and received a Lambeth LL.D. in January 1725.

== Career ==
Owing to his connection with the cathedral of Exeter and his aristocratic connections, Gilbert began early to climb the ladder of preferment. On 1 August 1721 he was appointed to the chapter living of Ashburton; on 4 January 1723 he succeeded to the prebendal stall vacated by his father's death; on 4 June 1724 he was appointed subdean of Exeter, which he vacated on his installation to the deanery, on 27 December 1726; on 8 January 1724 he was granted the degree of LLD at Lambeth. In January 1726, he received from the crown a canonry at Christ Church, which he held in commendam with the bishopric of Llandaff, to which he was consecrated on 28 December 1740.

In 1749, he was translated to Salisbury where he was also ex officio Chancellor of the Order of the Garter . In 1752, he succeeded Bishop Joseph Butler as Clerk of the Closet, and in 1757 the archiepiscopate of York, to which the office of Lord High Almoner was added, crowned his long series of ecclesiastical preferments.

=== Archbishop of York ===
Gilbert was mostly a place-holder archbishop. His health had begun to deteriorate prior to his appointment and he lived "through a pontificate of four years, when he sank under a complication of infirmities." Gilbert seems to have possessed few qualifications to justify his high promotion in the church. He was neither a scholar nor a theologian. Nor were these deficiencies compensated by graces of character. A friendly witness, Bishop Thomas Newton, speaks of his being regarded as "somewhat haughty;" while Horace Walpole, describes him as "composed of that common mixture of ignorance, meanness, and arrogance." John Newton, William Cowper's friend, when seeking to obtain ordination from him, found Gilbert "inflexible in supporting the rules and canons of the church."

His imperious character is illustrated by his refusal to allow the civic mace to be carried before the mayor of Salisbury in processions within the cathedral precincts, for which he claimed a separate jurisdiction, disobedience to which, it is said, caused an unseemly personal scuffle between him and the mace-bearer. According to Newton, Gilbert was the first prelate to introduce at confirmations the practice of the bishop laying his hands on each candidate at the altar rails, and then retiring and solemnly pronouncing the prayer once for the whole number. This mode was first observed at St. Mary's Church, Nottingham; it "commanded attention, and raised devotion," and before long became the regular manner of administering the rite.

== Personal life ==
Gilbert married Margaret Sherard (sister of Philip Sherard, 2nd Earl of Harborough and daughter of Bennet Sherard of Whissendine and Dorothy, daughter of Henry Fairfax, 4th Lord Fairfax of Cameron), who predeceased him. They were the parents of:

- Emma Gilbert, who married George Edgcumbe, 1st Earl of Mount Edgcumbe on 6 August 1761 at her father's house at Twickenham, three days before his death.

He died at Twickenham on 9 August 1761, aged 68, and was buried in a vault in Grosvenor Chapel, South Audley Street.

=== Legacy ===
Gilbert's only publications were occasional sermons. There are portraits of him, in the robes of the chancellor of the Order of the Garter.

== Arms ==
Coat of arms of John Gilbert

Notes
When Gilbert was serving as a bishop his arms would be displayed impaled with those of the diocese and topped by a mitre.
Escutcheon
Gules a leg in pale armed and couped at the thigh between two spears Proper.

Church of England titles
Preceded by Matthias Mawson	Bishop of Llandaff; 1740–1748	Succeeded by Edward Cresset
Preceded by Thomas Sherlock	Bishop of Salisbury; 1749–1757	Succeeded by John Thomas
Preceded by Matthew Hutton	Archbishop of York; 1757–1761	Succeeded by Robert Hay Drummond
