= John Bickersteth =

Bishop of Bath and Wells from 1975 to 1986

The Rt Revd John Bickersteth KCVO
- Bishop of Bath and Wells
- Diocese: Diocese of Bath and Wells
- In office: 1975–1986
- Predecessor: Edward Henderson
- Successor: George Carey
- Other posts: Clerk of the Closet; 1979–1989; Bishop of Warrington; 1970–1975

Orders
- Ordination: 1950 (deacon); 1951 (priest)
- Consecration: 1970

Personal details
- Born: 6 September 1921 Canterbury, Kent, England, United Kingdom
- Died: 29 January 2018 (aged 96) Salisbury, Wiltshire, England, United Kingdom
- Denomination: Anglican
- Education: Christ Church, Oxford

John Monier Bickersteth KCVO (6 September 1921 – 29 January 2018) was an English Anglican clergyman who served as the Bishop of Bath and Wells from 1975 to 1986, and Clerk of the Closet from 1979 to 1989.

Bickersteth descended from a clerical family over several generations; in total six family members have been Church of England Bishops. His father was the Rev. Canon Edward Monier Bickersteth OBE, and his mother, Inez Katharine Jelf Bickersteth, was a friend of the actress Sybil Thorndike. His uncle was Julian Bickersteth and his great-great-grandfather was Charles James Blomfield.

Educated at Rugby School and Christ Church, Oxford, he trained for ordination at Wells Theological College and was ordained deacon in 1950 and priest in 1951. He began his career with a curacy at St Matthew Moorfields Bristol (1950–54). He was then Incumbent of St John the Evangelist, Hurst Green, Oxted (1954–62). After a spell as Vicar of St Stephen's Church, Chatham he ascended to the Episcopate in 1970 as Suffragan Bishop of Warrington, and after five years was further promoted to Bath. From 1979 he was Clerk of the Closet for a decade.

Bickersteth died in January 2018 at the age of 96.

== Bibliography ==
- —; Dunning, Robert W. (1991). Clerks of the Closet in the Royal Household: Five Hundred Years of Service to the Crown. Stroud, Gloucestershire Wolfeboro Falls, NH: Alan Sutton Publishing. ISBN 978-0-86299-873-8. OCLC 28115550.
