= Clerk of the Closet =

English religious post in the household of the monarch

A Clerk of the Closet is a member of the clergy within the United Kingdom who is appointed to minister to the monarch of the United Kingdom.

The College of Chaplains of the Ecclesiastical Household of the Sovereign of the United Kingdom is under the Clerk of the Closet, an office dating from 1437. It is normally held by a diocesan bishop of the Church of England, who may, however, remain in office after leaving his see. In 2025 the current Clerk is Richard Jackson, Bishop of Hereford.

The term ‘closet’ referred originally to a private oratory set aside for the king or queen, where the Clerk would be in attendance.

Historically, other senior members of the royal family would sometimes appoint their own Clerk of the Closet.

== Duties ==
The Clerk of the Closet is responsible for advising the Private Secretary to the Sovereign on the names for candidates to fill vacancies in the Roll of Chaplains to the Sovereign. The Clerk manages 36 royal chaplains and preaches annually in the Chapel Royal, St James's Palace. He also presents bishops for homage to the Sovereign and examines any theological books to be presented to the Sovereign. He receives a salary of £7 a year.

The Clerk is assisted in his duties by the Deputy Clerk of the Closet (an office dating from 1677). Since 1931, the Deputy Clerk has also served as Sub-Almoner, Sub-Dean of the Chapels Royal and Domestic Chaplain at Buckingham Palace, and is the sole full-time clerical member of the Household.

== History ==
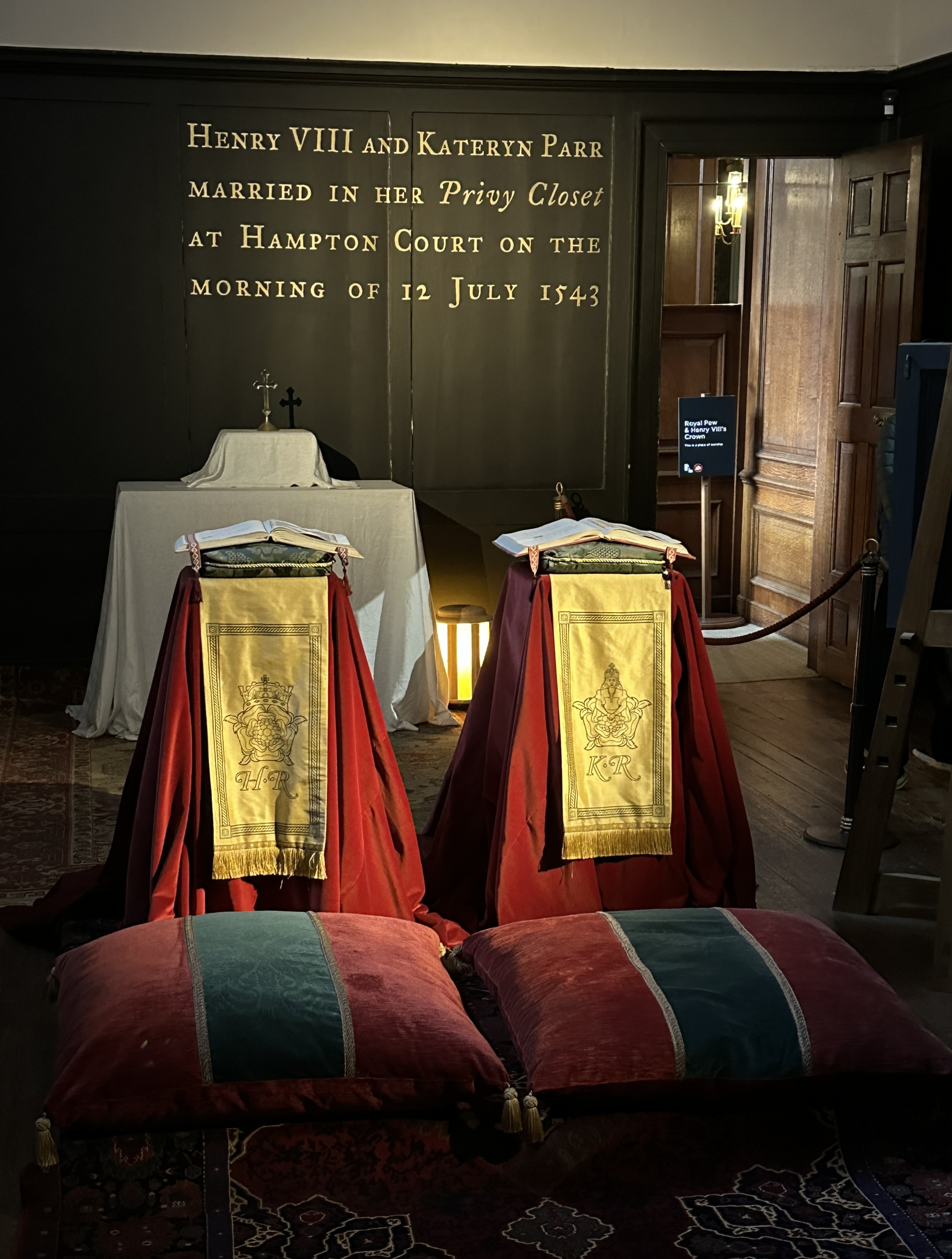
The Tudor closet at Hampton Court Palace; the door beyond leads to the Royal Pew in the gallery of the Chapel Royal.

The closet was in origin a private oratory, with its own altar, set aside for the use of the monarch within the private apartments of a palace. At the king's Palace of Westminster a closet was created in the 14th century at an upper level next to the south side of the altar of St Stephen's Chapel, to enable Edward III to observe the mass. By the 16th century, the closets in the larger palaces routinely provided access to a gallery, within the adjacent Chapel Royal, containing the monarch's private pew (as can still be seen in Hampton Court Palace). Queens consort often had their own closet, separated by a screen from that of their husband. Though adjacent to the Chapel Royal, the closet was still one of the monarch's private apartments, and administratively its Clerk was considered an officer of the Chamber (later the Privy Chamber), rather than of the Chapel Royal.

The earliest recorded evidence for the existence of a Clerk of the Closet dates from 1437, when one of the king's Chaplains, Edward Atherton (on being appointed Warden of the Bethlehem Hospital) was described as holding this office. Initially responsible for the ornaments and furnishings of the closet, the Clerk was also expected to be in close attendance to the monarch. On Sundays and holy days the king attended the Chapel Royal in state and his Clerk would stand directly behind him in the closet, ready to offer guidance or advice; thus, over time, the position of Clerk came to be one of significant influence. In the 15th and 16th centuries the Clerk had a co-ordinating role in relation to the royal chaplains, 'warning' them of the weeks when they were due to be in attendance at the royal court. (Like the Clerk, the chaplains were appointed by the monarch, not by the Dean of the chapel.) In the early 20th century, this relationship was revived when the Clerk of the Closet was formally recognised as head of what came to be termed the College of Chaplains. Otherwise, over the centuries, the Clerk has functioned primarily as a close confidant and ecclesiastical adviser to the sovereign.

== List of Clerks of the Closet ==
=== Clerks of the Closet in the Sovereign's Household ===
- Richard Jackson, Bishop of Hereford, 2023–
- James Newcome, Bishop of Carlisle 2014–2023
- Christopher Hill, Bishop of Guildford 2005–2014
- Jonathan Bailey, Bishop of Derby 1997–2005
- John Waine, Bishop of Chelmsford 1989–1997
- John Bickersteth, Bishop of Bath and Wells 1979–1989
- Gordon Fallows, Bishop of Sheffield 1975–1979
- Roger Wilson, Bishop of Chichester 1963–1975
- Percy Herbert, Bishop of Norwich 1942–1963
- Cyril Garbett, GCVO Bishop of Winchester 1937–1942
- Thomas Banks Strong, Bishop of Oxford 1925–1937
- Hubert Murray Burge, Bishop of Oxford 1918–1925
- William Boyd-Carpenter, Bishop of Ripon 1903–1918
- Randall Davidson, Bishop of Rochester 1891–1903
- Henry Philpott, Bishop of Worcester 1865–1892
- John Graham, Bishop of Chester 1849–1865
- Edward Stanley, Bishop of Norwich 1837–1849
- Robert James Carr, Bishop of Chichester 1827–1837
- George Pelham, Bishop of Exeter 1815–1827
- William Jackson, Bishop of Oxford by 1813–1815
- Richard Hurd, Bishop of Worcester 1781–1808
- William Buller 1763–1773 (later Bishop of Exeter)
- John Thomas, Bishop of Salisbury, Bishop of Winchester 1757–1763
- John Gilbert, Bishop of Salisbury 1752–1757
- Joseph Butler, Bishop of Bristol 1746–1752
- Henry Egerton, Bishop of Hereford 1735–1746
- Richard Willis, Bishop of Winchester 1723–1734
- Charles Trimnell, Bishop of Norwich 1714–1723
- William Graham, Dean of Carlisle 1702–1714 (jointly)
- John Younger, Dean of Salisbury 1702–1714 (jointly)
- Samuel Pratt, Dean of Rochester 1702–1714 (jointly)
- John Montagu, Dean of Durham 1695–1702
- Thomas Burnet 1691–1695
- James Canaries 1691–1692 (representing Scottish Episcopalian Church)
- John Tillotson, Dean of St Paul's 1689–1691
- William Stanley 1689–1694 (Clerk of the Closet to the Queen (Mary II))
- Sir Edward Petre S.J. 1687–1693 (after 1689 in exile with James II)
- Thomas Sprat, Bishop of Rochester 1685–1687
- Nathaniel Crew, Dean of Chichester, Bishop of Oxford, Bishop of Durham 1669–1685
- Walter Blandford, Bishop of Worcester 1668–1669
- John Dolben, Dean of Westminster 1664–1668
- John Earle, Bishop of Salisbury 1651–1664 (1651–1660 in exile with Charles II)
- Gilbert Sheldon 1646–1651 later Archbishop of Canterbury
- Richard Steward 1636–1646 designated Dean of St Paul's
- Matthew Wren, Bishop of Hereford 1633–1636
- William Juxon, Dean of Worcester 1632–1633
- Walter Balcanquhall 1617–1621 (represented the Church of Scotland at the Synod of Dort)
- Richard Neile, Archbishop of York 1603–1632
- John Thornborough, Bishop of Limerick 1588–1603
- John Rycarde c.1556
- John Rudd 1540s
- Edward Layton, Archdeacon of Sarum by 1538–after 1544
- Edward Higgins c.1520
- Geoffrey Wren 1510- >1515
- Edward Atherton

=== Clerks of the Closet in other Households ===
==== Household of the Queen consort ====
- Joseph Butler, Clerk of the Closet to Caroline of Ansbach 1736–37
- Isaac Maddox, Clerk of the Closet to Caroline of Ansbach 1729–1736
- Lancelot Blackburne, Clerk of the Closet to Caroline of Ansbach
- Thomas Patten, Clerk of the Closet to Anne of Denmark

==== Household of the Prince of Wales ====
- Frederick William Blomberg, Clerk of the Closet to George Augustus Frederick, Prince of Wales 1808–1820
- Rev Dr John Lockman, Clerk of the Closet to George Augustus Frederick, Prince of Wales 1787–1807
- Samuel Squire, Clerk of the Closet to George William Frederick, Prince of Wales 1756–1760
- Francis Ayscough, Clerk of the Closet to Frederick, Prince of Wales 1736–51
- John Harris, Clerk of the Closet to George Augustus, Prince of Wales by 1724
- Henry Burton, Clerk of the Closet to Henry Frederick, Prince of Wales 1612

==== Household of the Princess Dowager of Wales ====
- Cutts Barton, Clerk of the Closet to Augusta, Princess Dowager of Wales 1766–1772
- Edward Young, Clerk of the Closet to Augusta, Princess Dowager of Wales 1761–1765
- Stephen Hales, Clerk of the Closet to Augusta, Princess Dowager of Wales 1752–1761

== Bibliography ==
- Bickersteth, John; Dunning, Robert W. (1991). Clerks of the Closet in the Royal Household: Five Hundred Years of Service to the Crown. Stroud, Gloucestershire Wolfeboro Falls, NH: Alan Sutton Publishing. ISBN 978-0-86299-873-8. OCLC 28115550.
