= Thornhill Grammar School =

Building in Thornhill, West Yorkshire, England

Coordinates: 53.6659°N 1.6208°W

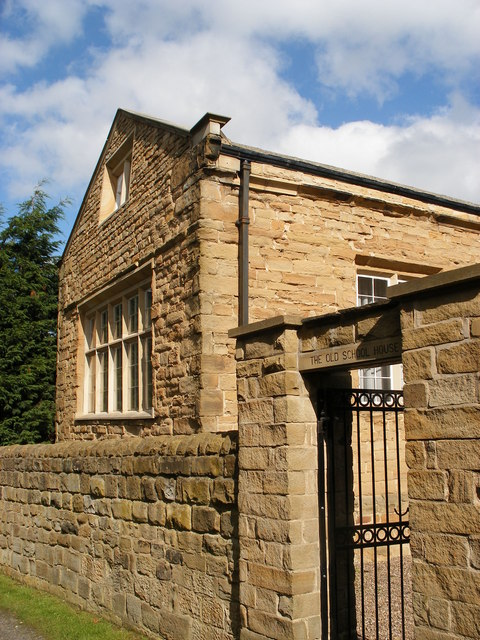
The old school house

Thornhill Grammar School was built in Thornhill near Dewsbury in West Yorkshire, England. In 1642 the Rev Charles Greenwood bequeathed £500 to build and endow a free school. The former school building is dated 1643 and now disused. The rear part of the building was built as a copy in 1884. It is a grade II listed building.
