= Paul Wright (sub-dean of the Chapel Royal) =

British Anglican priest and chaplain (born 1966)

The Reverend Canon Paul Wright
- Sub-Dean of the Chapel Royal and Deputy Clerk of the Closet
- Church: Church of England
- In office: 2015–present
- Predecessor: Bill Scott

Orders
- Ordination: 1993 (deacon); 1994 (priest)

Personal details
- Born: Paul Stephen Wright; 26 December 1966 (age 59) Winstanley, Wigan, Lancashire, England
- Denomination: Anglicanism
- Education: Lancashire Polytechnic; Westcott House, Cambridge; University of Liverpool; Cardiff University
- Military career
- Allegiance: United Kingdom
- Branch: British Army; Royal Auxiliary Air Force
- Service years: 1994–2015; 2015–present
- Rank: Chaplain to the Forces 2nd Class (Lt Col); Reverend (wing commander)
- Units: Royal Army Chaplains' Department; Royal Air Force Chaplains Branch

Paul Stephen Wright LVO (born 26 December 1966) is a British Anglican priest and chaplain. Since 2015, he has served as Sub-Dean of the Chapel Royal and Deputy Clerk of the Closet: as such, he is the only full-time clerical member of the Royal Household of the United Kingdom. Prior to his royal service, he was ordained in the Church of England and served in the Royal Army Chaplains' Department. His last post before leaving the military was as Chaplain of the Royal Military Academy, Sandhurst.

== Early life and education ==
Wright was born on 26 December 1966 in Winstanley, Wigan, Lancashire, England. He studied at Lancashire Polytechnic, graduating with a Bachelor of Arts (BA) degree in 1988. From 1990 to 1993, he trained for Holy Orders at Westcott House, Cambridge, a Liberal Anglican theological college. He undertook further studies at the University of Liverpool, completing a Master of Arts (MA) degree in 1996, and at Cardiff University, completing a Master of Theology (MTh) degree in 2011.

== Career ==
=== Early ministry ===
Wright was ordained in the Church of England as a deacon in 1993 and as a priest in 1994. From 1993 to 1996, he served his curacy at Church of St Thomas the Martyr, Upholland in the Diocese of Liverpool.

=== Military service ===
He was commissioned into the Royal Army Chaplains Department in 1994. He has served with the Royal Artillery, the Army Foundation College, the Queen's Lancashire Regiment, the Queen's Dragoon Guards, the 2nd Infantry Brigade. In 2003 he served in Iraq and at Supreme Headquarters Allied Powers in Europe in Belgium, while in 2005 he served in Bosnia and Kosovo as Senior Chaplain of the European Union Force.

In 2010, Wright was posted as Senior Chaplain of the Allied Rapid Reaction Corps in Gloucester and the International Security Assistance Force Joint Command in Kabul. He was appointed as the Chaplain of the Royal Military Academy in 2012. He retired from the army on 1 January 2015.

On 19 January 2015, he was commissioned in the Royal Auxiliary Air Force as a chaplain with the rank of reverend (wing commander). In 2018, he was awarded the Medal for Long Service and Good Conduct (Military), awarded for 15 years' service in the British Army.

=== Royal service ===
In January 2015, Wright was installed as Sub-Dean of the Chapel Royal during a service at the Chapel Royal of St James's Palace, in succession to Bill Scott. As Sub-Dean, he is also Deputy Clerk of the Closet, Sub-Almoner, and Domestic Chaplain to the late Queen, Elizabeth II and now her son, Charles III. The Deputy Clerk is the only full-time clerical member of the Ecclesiastical Household.

Wright was appointed Lieutenant of the Royal Victorian Order (LVO) in the 2023 New Year Honours. He took part in the Royal procession at the 2023 Coronation.

=== Writings ===
In 2009, Wright wrote Funny Little Wars: Games of War in the Garden With Classic Toy Soldiers In The Spirit of Mr. H G Wells. In 2022, a revised edition was published, which added new content to complement the existing rules.

== Personal life ==
In 2006, Wright married his second wife, Georgina Elisabeth Peek. She is a trained singer. Wright has four children: two sons and two daughters.

Court offices
Preceded by Bill Scott	Deputy Clerk of the Closet; 2015–present	Incumbent
