= Anthony Caesar =

English priest, organist, and composer (1924–2018)

Anthony Douglass Caesar CVO FRCO (3 April 1924 – 14 July 2018) was an English priest, organist and composer.

Caesar was a boy chorister in the Winchester Cathedral Choir under Harold Rhodes, who directed choir rehearsals in the short street known as "Dome Alley", the title later on of one of Caesar's hymn tunes set to the hymn 'God is love: let heav'n adore him'. He studied music at Magdalene College, Cambridge where he was a music scholar and trained for the Anglican priesthood at St Stephen's House, Oxford. From 3 August 1979 to 1 August 1991 he was Subdean of the Chapels Royal (having previously been Canon Precentor and Vice-Dean of Winchester Cathedral). During this period he was also the music editor of the New English Hymnal in which appears his tune 'Newtown St Luke' (a part of Southampton) written for the Christmastide hymn 'Child of the stable's secret birth' (New English Hymnal 43). In the 1991 Queen's Birthday Honours he was promoted to Commander of the Royal Victorian Order (CVO), having previously been appointed a Lieutenant of that order in the 1987 New Year Honours. Following his retirement from the Chapel Royal, he was appointed an Extra Chaplain to the Royal Household. He is best known for his short Mass setting, Missa Brevis Capella Regalis, and his setting of Digby Mackworth Dolben's poem Requests, as well as his "O For a Closer walk with God". He died in July 2018 at the age of 94.
