= Royal Almonry =

Office within the royal household of the United Kingdom

The Royal Almonry is a small office within the Royal Households of the United Kingdom, headed by the Lord High Almoner, an office dating from 1103. The almoner is responsible for distributing alms to the poor.

The Lord High Almoner is usually a diocesan bishop or high cleric of the Church of England. There is also an hereditary Grand Almoner, an office dating from 1685 and vested in the person of the Marquess of Exeter, but this is not an office of the Royal Almonry and he has no role to play. The actual work of the office is undertaken by the Sub-Almoner (currently Paul Wright), who is also the Deputy Clerk of the Closet of the Ecclesiastical Household, Sub-Dean of the Chapel Royal, and Domestic Chaplain at Buckingham Palace.

There are in addition a Secretary, and Assistant Secretary, both offices of which are shared with other Royal Household appointments. There are also half a dozen wandsmen.

== Duties ==
In the 13th century, the Lord High Almoner was responsible for giving alms from the royal household to the poor. Today, the Almonry is responsible for the arrangements for the Royal Maundy service, which is held annually every Maundy Thursday. The royal service was traditionally given at Westminster Abbey until the reign of Queen Elizabeth II, when the service rotated among various British cathedrals. The service includes various elements, including the Yeomen of the Guard and six wandsmen who act as ushers. At the service, the sovereign traditionally gives purses of coins ("Maundy Money") to a man and a woman for every year of the sovereign's age. If the sovereign is infirm, then he or she may be represented by a different member of the royal family; for example, in 2022, Charles, Prince of Wales represented the 95-year-old Elizabeth at the service.

Until 1737, the Lord High Almoner personally washed the feet of Maundy recipients.

== Lord High Almoners ==
Henry III (1216)

- John Leukenor, Knight Templar
- 1233: Brother John and Brother Geoffrey (to 1239)
- 1255–unknown: Simon of Offam
- 1256–unknown: John of Colchester
- 1257: John the Chaplain

Edward I (1272)

- Friar Ralph
- c.1280–1307: Master Henry of Blunsdon

Edward II (1307)

- c.1323: Adam de Brome

Edward III (1327)

- c.1340: Philip Weston
- Thomas Hatfield (Bishop of Durham, 1345)

Richard II (1377)

- 1383: William Walsham

Henry IV (1399)

- 1399: Robert Eslakby
- ? –1413 Earl of Cambridge

Henry V (1413)

- 1413–unknown: James Tuchet, 5th Baron Audley

Henry VI (1422)

- 142n–unknown: John Snell
- ?–1432: John De la Bere (later Bishop of St David's, 1447)
- 1432–1438: Robert Felton
- 1438–unknown: Henry Sever, Chancellor of St Paul's Cathedral

Edward IV (1461)

- 1461–?1466: Thomas Wilford
- ?1466–1468: Thomas Bonyfaunt
- 1468–1476: John Gunthorpe, Dean of Wells and, until 1478, Archdeacon of Essex
- 1471: Alexander Legh
- 1476–1483: Thomas Danet
- 1483: Walter Felde

Richard III (1483)

- 1483-1485 John Taillour

Henry VII (1485)

- 1485–1495: Christopher Urswick
- 1495-1497: Richard FitzJames
- 1497–unknown: Richard Mayew, Bishop of Hereford (died 1516)
- unknown: Christopher Bainbridge
- 28 January 1507 - 1509: John Ednam (Edenham)
- unknown–1509: Thomas Hobbes, Dean of Exeter.

Henry VIII (1509); Edward VI (1547); Mary I (1553)

- 1509–1514: Cardinal Thomas Wolsey, Archbishop of York (etc.)
- 1514–unknown: Richard Rawlins, Archdeacon of Huntingdon (later Bishop of St David's), 1523) (died 1528)
- 1521–unknown: John Longland, Bishop of Lincoln (died 1547)
- 1523–unknown: Edward Lee (later Archbishop of York, 1531)
- 1530–unknown: John Stokesley, Bishop of London (died 1539)
- c.1532–1537: Edward Foxe, Bishop of Hereford, 1535
- 1537–>1555: Nicholas Heath, Bishop of Rochester (died 1578)

Elizabeth I (1558)

- 1559–1561: William Bill, Master of Trinity
- 1561–1572: Edmund Guest, Bishop of Rochester.
- 1576–unknown: John Piers, Bishop of Salisbury, later Archbishop of York. {died 1594)
- 29 March 1572 – 1591: Edmund Freke, Bishop of Worcester
- 1591–1594: Richard Fletcher, Bishop of Bristol
- 1595–unknown: Anthony Watson, Bishop of Chichester (died 1605)

James I (1603)

- 1605–1626: Lancelot Andrewes, Bishop of Chichester, then of Ely
- 1619–unknown: George Montaigne (or Mountain), Bishop of London (etc.) (died 1628)

Charles I (1625)

- 1626: Francis White, Bishop of Carlisle, then Bishop of Norwich and Bishop of Ely (died 1638)
- 1632–unknown: Walter Curle, Prelate of the Garter and Bishop of Winchester (died 1647)

Commonwealth (1649-1660)
Charles II (1660)

- 1660–1662: Brian Duppa, Bishop of Winchester
- 1662–1675: Humphrey Henchman, Bishop of Salisbury, then Bishop of London
- 1675–1684: John Dolben, Bishop of Rochester

James II (1685)

- 1684–1687: Francis Turner, Bishop of Ely
- 1687: John Leyburn, Vicar Apostolic of England
- 1687–1689: Cardinal Philip Howard

William III (1689); Anne (1702)

- 1689–1703: William Lloyd, Bishop of St Asaph, then of Lichfield and Coventry, then of Worcester
- 1703–1714: John Sharp, Archbishop of York

George I (1714); George II (1727)

- 1714–1715: George Smalridge, Bishop of Bristol
- 1715–1716: William Wake, Bishop of Lincoln
- 1716–1718: William Nicolson, Bishop of Carlisle
- 1718–1723: Richard Willis, Bishop of Gloucester
- 1723–1743: Lancelot Blackburne, Archbishop of York
- 1743–1748: Thomas Sherlock, Bishop of Salisbury
- 1748–1757: Matthew Hutton, Archbishop of York
- 1757–1761: John Gilbert, Archbishop of York

George III (1760); George IV (1820); William IV (1830); Victoria (1837)

- 1761–1777: Robert Hay Drummond, Archbishop of York
- 1777–1808: William Markham, Archbishop of York
- 1808–1847: Edward Venables-Vernon-Harcourt, Archbishop of York
- 1847–1870: Samuel Wilberforce, Bishop of Oxford, then of Winchester
- 1870–1882: Gerald Wellesley, Dean of Windsor
- 1882–1906: Lord Alwyne Compton, Bishop of Ely

Edward VII (1901); George V (1910)

- 1906–1933: Joseph Armitage Robinson, Dean of Westminster, then of Wells

Edward VIII (1936); George VI (1936); Elizabeth II (1952); Charles III (2022)

- 1933–1945: Cosmo Gordon Lang, Archbishop of Canterbury
- 1946–1953: Edward Woods, Bishop of Lichfield
- 1953–1970: Michael Gresford Jones, Bishop of St Albans
- 1970–1988: David Say, Bishop of Rochester
- 1988–1997: John Taylor, Bishop of St Albans
- 1997–2013: Nigel McCulloch, Bishop of Manchester
- 2013–2024: John Inge, Bishop of Worcester
- 2024–present: Graham Usher, Bishop of Norwich

== Sources ==
- "The Royal Almonry". Diocese of Manchester. Archived from the original on 16 July 2011.
- Bucholz, R. O. (2006). "The Chapel Royal: Lord Almoners and Sub-Almoners". Court Officers, 1660–1837. Office-Holders in Modern Britain. Vol. 11. British History Online. pp. 245–247.
