= Dean of Bradford =

Church of England senior clergy member

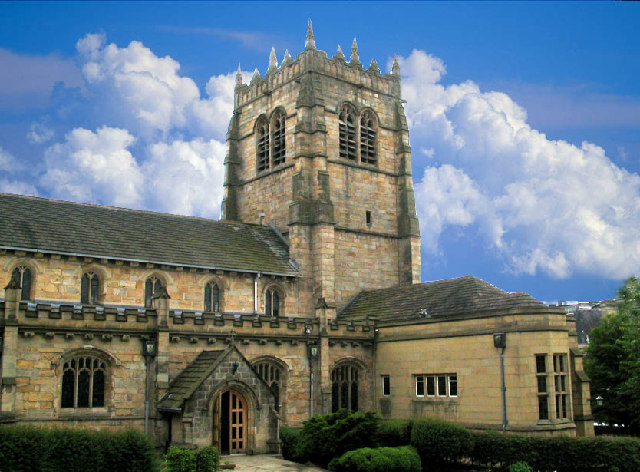
Bradford Cathedral

The Dean of Bradford is the head and chair of the chapter of canons, the ruling body of Bradford Cathedral. The dean and chapter are based at the Cathedral Church of St Peter in Bradford. Before 2000 the post was designated as a provost, which was then the equivalent of a dean at most English cathedrals. The cathedral is one of three co-equal mother churches of the Diocese of Leeds and a seat of the Bishop of Leeds; until 2014 it was the mother church of the now-defunct Diocese of Bradford and as such the seat of the diocesan Bishop of Bradford.

== List of deans ==
=== Provosts ===
- 1930–1931 Cecil Wilson
- 1933–1943 Edward Mowll
- 1944–1962 John Tiarks
- 1962–1977 Alan Cooper
- 1977–1989 Brandon Jackson
- 1990–2000 John Richardson (became Dean)

=== Deans ===
- 2000–2001 John Richardson (previously Provost)
- 2002–2004 Christopher Hancock
- 2005–2012 David Ison
- 2012–2013 Andy Williams (Acting)
- 2013–2021 Jerry Lepine
- 2022–2026 Andy Bowerman
