= John Tiarks =

British bishop (1903–1974)

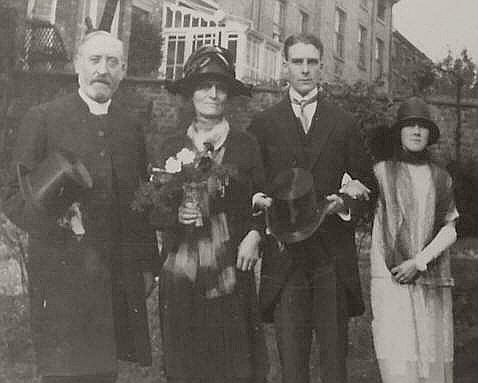
John Tiarks with his wife and parents, 1927

John Gerhard Tiarks (5 April 1903 – 2 January 1974) was an Anglican bishop whose ecclesiastical career spanned forty five years in the mid twentieth century.

Educated at Westminster School and Trinity College, Cambridge and ordained in 1927 — he was deaconed at Petertide 1926 (4 July) and priested the next Trinity Sunday (12 June 1927), both times by Albert David, Bishop of Liverpool, at Liverpool Cathedral — he began his career with a curacy at Christ Church Southport after which he was Vicar of Norris Green. He then held further incumbencies in Widnes and St Helens before becoming Provost of Bradford Cathedral. In 1962 he became Bishop of Chelmsford, a post he held for nine years. He was consecrated a bishop on 24 February 1962 by Michael Ramsey, Archbishop of Canterbury, at Westminster Abbey; he was second-cousin to Geoffrey Tiarks (Bishop of Maidstone, 1969–1976).

Church of England titles
Preceded by Edward Mowll	Provost of Bradford; 1944–1962	Succeeded by Alan Cooper
Preceded by Falkner Allison	Bishop of Chelmsford; 1962–1971	Succeeded by John Trillo
