= Rex Alston =

British radio sports broadcaster (1901–1994)

Rex Alston in the 1960s

Arthur Rex Alston (2 July 1901 – 8 September 1994) was a leading sports commentator for BBC radio on cricket, rugby union, athletics and tennis from the mid-1940s to the mid-1960s.

== Early life and education ==
Alston's middle name at birth was "Reginald", but he subsequently changed it to "Rex". His father was Arthur Fawssett Alston, the third Bishop of Middleton.

Alston was a pupil at Trent College, Derbyshire, before going on to study at Clare College, Cambridge. A considerable sportsman in his own right, he obtained a Cambridge Blue for athletics in 1923, captained Bedfordshire County Cricket Club in 1932, and played on the wing for Bedford and Rosslyn Park rugby clubs.

== Career ==
Alston was a schoolmaster at Bedford School from 1924 to 1941, before joining the BBC. He was originally a billeting officer, but it was soon realised that his voice – a clear, light baritone – was too good for him to remain in an administrative role. He remained on the BBC staff until 1961, and continued broadcasting for a few years after that as a free-lance. He wrote on cricket and rugby for the Daily Telegraph and Sunday Telegraph, continuing to report on county cricket for the former until 1987. He also had a column in Playfair Cricket Monthly.

His first international cricket commentary was on the Old Trafford "Victory Test" in 1945, as a deputy for Howard Marshall. He quickly became an ever-present in a Test match commentary team which included John Arlott and E. W. Swanton, and also was the producer. He commented on about a hundred Tests in all, many of them after the launch of Test Match Special in 1957 expanded the coverage to include the full day's play rather than only portions of it. His last Test was in 1964. Alston continued to commentate on Cricket alongside Godfrey Evans for ITV's coverage during the late 1960s/early 1970s.

== Later life ==
Alston had the unsettling experience of reading his own obituary in The Times in 1985. A misunderstanding led to his obituary being published, instead of merely updated for the files. By an unfortunate coincidence, Alston had collapsed the previous evening at a dinner, and was a patient at the Westminster Hospital at the time. Next year he remarried, and so became almost certainly the only man to have his death and marriage reported in The Times in that order.

== Writing ==
Alston wrote a number of books, including:

- Taking the Air, Stanley Paul, 1951.
- Over to Rex Alston. A commentary on the 1953 Australian tour, Frederick Muller Ltd, 1953.
- Test Commentary: An Account of the Australian Tour of 1956, Stanley Paul, 1956.
- Watching cricket: An aid to the appreciation of first-class cricket, and a guide to the laws (Sports books), Phoenix House, 1962.
- Rothmans Rugby Yearbook 1973-74, The Queen Anne Press Ltd, 1974.
- One Hundred Years of Rugby Football; a History of Rosslyn Park Football Club 1879-1979 (Editor), 1979.
