= Brandon Jackson (priest) =

British Anglican priest (1934–2023)

Brandon Donald Jackson (11 August 1934 – 29 January 2023) was a British Anglican priest who was Dean of Lincoln during a very acrimonious period in the late 20th century.

Jackson was born in Stockport, Greater Manchester, and educated at Stockport School, where he was head boy, and Liverpool University. He was ordained in 1959. After curacies at Christ Church, New Malden, and St George's, Leeds, he became vicar of St Peter's Shipley and then provost of Bradford Cathedral. During his turbulent years at Lincoln Cathedral he was acquitted by a consistory court of allegations of sexual misconduct.

Jackson died on 29 January 2023, at the age of 88.

Church of England titles
Preceded by Alan Cooper	Provost of Bradford; 1977–1989	Succeeded by John Richardson
Preceded by Oliver Fiennes	Dean of Lincoln; 1989–1997	Succeeded by Alec Knight
