= Alan Cooper =

Alan Cooper may refer to:

- Alan Cooper (bishop) (1909–1999), English Anglican bishop
- Alan Cooper (biblical scholar), provost of the Jewish Theological Seminary of America
- Alan Cooper (software designer) (born 1952), American software designer and programmer
- Alan Cooper (biologist) (born 1966), New Zealand evolutionary molecular biologist and ancient DNA researcher
- Alan Cooper (The Inbetweeners), character in the British TV sitcom The Inbetweeners

== See also ==
- Allan Cooper (1916–1970), Australian cricketer
- Allen F. Cooper (1862–1917), American politician
