= The Iron Lady (film) =

2011 British biographical drama film

- UK Theatrical release poster
- Directed by: Phyllida Lloyd
- Written by: Abi Morgan
- Produced by: Damian Jones
- Starring: Meryl Streep; Jim Broadbent; Olivia Colman; Roger Allam; Susan Brown; Nick Dunning; Nicholas Farrell; Iain Glen; Richard E. Grant; Anthony Head; Harry Lloyd; Michael Maloney; Alexandra Roach; Amanda Root; Pip Torrens; Julian Wadham; Angus Wright
- Cinematography: Elliot Davis
- Edited by: Justine Wright
- Music by: Thomas Newman
- Production companies: Pathé; Film4; UK Film Council; Canal+; Ciné+; DJ Films
- Distributed by: 20th Century Fox (United Kingdom); Pathé Distribution (France)
- Release dates: 26 December 2011 (Australia); 6 January 2012 (United Kingdom); 19 January 2012 (America); 15 February 2012 (France)
- Running time: 104 minutes
- Countries: France; United Kingdom
- Budget: $13 million
- Box office: $115.9 million

The Iron Lady is a 2011 biographical drama film based on the life and career of Margaret Thatcher, a British politician who was the longest-serving Prime Minister of the United Kingdom of the 20th century and the first woman to hold the office. The film was directed by Phyllida Lloyd and written by Abi Morgan. Thatcher is portrayed primarily by Meryl Streep, and, in her formative and early political years, by Alexandra Roach. Thatcher's husband, Denis Thatcher, is portrayed by Jim Broadbent and by Harry Lloyd as the younger Denis. Thatcher's longest-serving cabinet member and eventual deputy, Geoffrey Howe, is portrayed by Anthony Head.

Despite the film's mixed reception, Streep's performance was widely acclaimed. She received her 17th Oscar nomination for her portrayal and ultimately won the award for the third time—29 years after her second Oscar win. She also earned her third Golden Globe Award for Best Actress – Motion Picture Drama award (her eighth Golden Globe Award win overall) and her second BAFTA Award for Best Actress in a Leading Role. The film also won the Academy Award for Best Makeup and the BAFTA Award for Best Makeup and Hair.

The film was loosely based on John Campbell's biography The Iron Lady: Margaret Thatcher, from Grocer's Daughter to Prime Minister.

== Plot ==
The story begins with Thatcher in the present experiencing dementia and seeing her deceased husband Denis with her as a ghost. In a series of flashbacks, the young Margaret Roberts works at the family grocer's shop in Grantham, listening to the political speeches of her father, whom she idolises; it is also hinted that she has a poor relationship with her mother, a housewife.

She wins a place at Somerville College, Oxford University. She struggles as a young lower-middle-class woman attempting to break into a snobbish male-dominated Conservative Party and find a seat in the House of Commons. She meets affluent businessman Denis Thatcher who is impressed by her eloquence and asks her to marry him; she accepts, but only after telling him she will not be satisfied to look beautiful at his side and be a mere housewife and mother: "I don't want to die cleaning a teacup."

Her struggles to fit in as a "Lady Member" of the House and as Education Secretary in Edward Heath's Cabinet are also shown, as are her friendship with Airey Neave, her decision to stand for Leader of the Conservative Party, her eventual victory, her voice coaching and image change.

Further flashbacks examine historical events during her time as Prime Minister, after winning the 1979 General Election, including the rising unemployment related to her monetarist policies and the tight 1981 budget (over the misgivings of "wet" members of her Cabinet – Ian Gilmour, Francis Pym, Michael Heseltine, and Jim Prior), the 1981 Brixton riot, the 1984–1985 UK miners' strike, and the bombing in Brighton of the Grand Hotel during the 1984 Conservative Party Conference, when she and her husband were almost killed. Also shown is her decision to retake the Falkland Islands following the invasion by Argentina in 1982, the sinking of the ARA General Belgrano and Britain's subsequent victory, her friendship with U.S. President Ronald Reagan aiding her emergence as a world figure, and the economic boom of the late 1980s.

By 1990, Thatcher is shown as an imperious but ageing figure, ranting aggressively at her cabinet, refusing to accept that the "Poll Tax" is unjust, even while it is causing riots, and fiercely opposed to European integration. (Note: She refers anachronistically to the European Community (as it was then called) as the "European Union", its new name under the 1993 Maastricht Treaty, which became widely used by the end of the 1990s. See History of the European Union.) Her deputy, Geoffrey Howe, resigns after she needlessly chastises him in a cabinet meeting. Heseltine challenges her for the party leadership, and her loss of support from her cabinet colleagues forces her to resign as Prime Minister after eleven years in office. A teary-eyed Thatcher exits 10 Downing Street for the last time as Prime Minister with Denis comforting her. She is shown as still disheartened about it almost twenty years later.

Eventually, Thatcher is shown packing her late husband's belongings and telling him it is time for him to go. Denis' ghost leaves her as she cries that she is not yet ready to lose him, to which he replies, "You're going to be fine on your own... you always have been", before leaving forever. Having finally overcome her grief, she contentedly washes a teacup alone in her kitchen.

== Cast ==
- Meryl Streep as Margaret Thatcher
  - Alexandra Roach as young Margaret Thatcher
- Jim Broadbent as Denis Thatcher
  - Harry Lloyd as young Denis Thatcher
- Iain Glen as Alfred Roberts, Margaret's father
- Emma Dewhurst as Beatrice Roberts, Margaret's mother
- Victoria Bewick as Muriel Roberts, Margaret's sister
- Olivia Colman as Carol Thatcher
- Anthony Head as Sir Geoffrey Howe
- Nicholas Farrell as Airey Neave
- Richard E. Grant as Michael Heseltine
- Susan Brown as June, Margaret's live-in carer
- Martin Wimbush as Mark Carlisle
- Paul Bentley as Douglas Hurd
- Robin Kermode as John Major
- John Sessions as Edward Heath
- Roger Allam as Gordon Reece
- David Westhead as Reg Prentice
- Michael Pennington as Michael Foot
- Angus Wright as John Nott
- Julian Wadham as Francis Pym
- Nick Dunning as Jim Prior
- Pip Torrens as Baron Ian Gilmour of Craigmillar
- Nicholas Jones as Admiral Sir Henry Leach
- David Rintoul as Admiral Baron John Fieldhouse
- Matthew Marsh as Alexander Haig
- Phoebe Waller-Bridge as Susie, Margaret's Secretary
- Ronald Reagan (archive footage) as himself
  - Reginald Green as Ronald Reagan

== Production ==
Filming began in the UK on 31 December 2010, and the film was released in late 2011.

In preparation for her role, Streep sat through a session at the House of Commons of Parliament in January 2011 to observe British MPs in action. Extensive filming took place at the neogothic Manchester Town Hall.

Streep said: "The prospect of exploring the swathe cut through history by this remarkable woman is a daunting and exciting challenge. I am trying to approach the role with as much zeal, fervour and attention to detail as the real Lady Thatcher possesses – I can only hope my stamina will begin to approach her own."

NPR commentator Robert Seigel and Thatcher biographer John Campbell accused writer Abi Morgan and star Meryl Streep of using their influence to dictate some historical inaccuracies, such as showing no other women serving in the House of Commons during Thatcher's time, hoping to present a more sympathetic image of Thatcher to the film's American audience.

== Reception ==
=== Box office ===
The film grossed $30 million in the North American market, and $85 million in other markets, for a worldwide gross of $115 million.

=== Critical reception ===
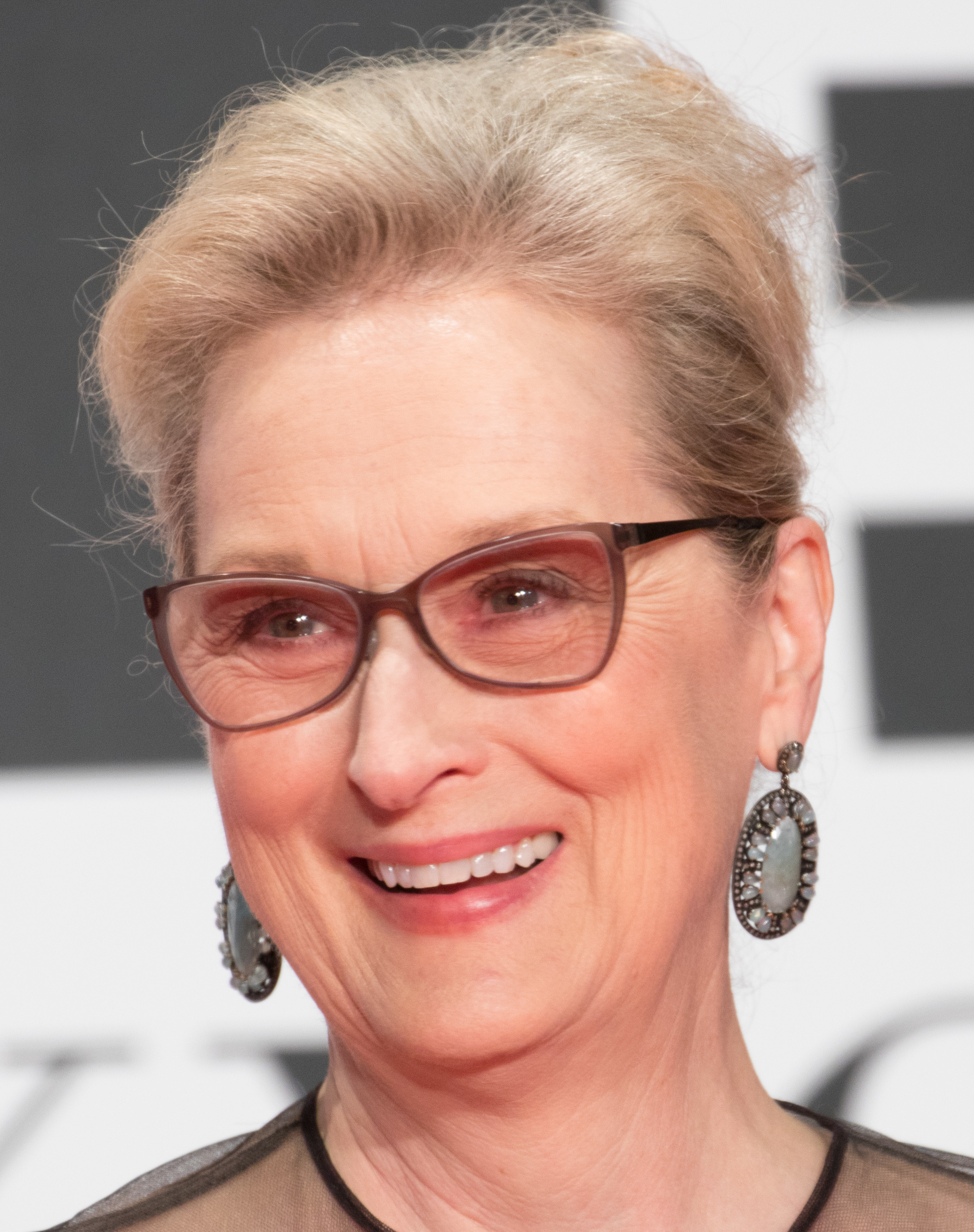
Meryl Streep's performance garnered critical acclaim and she received her third Academy Award, her second BAFTA award and her eighth Golden Globe award for her portrayal as Margaret Thatcher in this film.

The Iron Lady received mixed reviews from critics, although there was strong praise for Streep's performance. On Rotten Tomatoes, the film has an approval rating of 51% and an average score of 5.7/10, based on 230 reviews. The site's consensus reads: "Meryl Streep's performance as The Iron Lady is reliably perfect, but it's mired in bland, self-important storytelling." At Metacritic, the film has a score of 54 out of 100, based on 41 critics, indicating "mixed or average reviews". Audiences surveyed by CinemaScore gave the film an average grade of "B+" on an A+ to F scale.

Thatcher's children, Mark and Carol, have criticised the film's depiction of her and reportedly said before the completion of the film that "it sounds like some left-wing fantasy." Stuart Jeffries of the British newspaper The Guardian was cautiously optimistic about a non-British actor playing Thatcher. Karen Sue Smith of America wrote that "by combining the Baroness's real roles of wife, mother and leader, the film's portrait of her does what many purported 'lives of great men' fail to do – namely, show the person in context, in the quotidian."

The Daily Telegraph reported in January 2012 that "it is impossible not to be disturbed by [Streep's] depiction of Lady Thatcher's decline into dementia" as part of an article that was headlined: "The Iron Lady reflects society's insensitive attitude towards people with dementia." Roger Ebert gave the film two stars out of four, praising Streep's performance but lamenting that "she's all dressed up with nowhere to go" in a film that cannot decide what it wants to say about Thatcher: "Few people were neutral in their feelings about her, except the makers of this picture."

Despite the film's mixed reviews, Streep's title role performance garnered critical acclaim. Kevin Maher of The Times said: "Streep has found the woman within the caricature." David Gritten in The Daily Telegraph commented: "Awards should be coming Streep's way; yet her brilliance rather overshadows the film itself." Xan Brooks of The Guardian said Streep's performance "is astonishing and all but flawless". Richard Corliss of Time named Streep's performance one of the Top 10 Movie Performances of 2011.

Streep's portrayal ultimately won her the Academy Award for Best Actress (her 17th nomination and third award overall), as well as several other awards, including the BAFTA Award for Best Actress in a Leading Role and the Golden Globe Award for Best Actress – Motion Picture Drama. The film also won the Academy Award for Best Makeup.

==== Reactions from British politicians ====
In an interview with the BBC, then Prime Minister David Cameron described Streep's performance as "great" and "fantastic" but opined that the filmmakers should have waited before making the movie and focused more on Thatcher's time in office rather than her personal life and struggles with dementia. Former Conservative Party chairman Norman Fowler was more critical of the film and stated "She [Thatcher] was never, in my experience, the half-hysterical, over-emotional, over-acting woman portrayed by Meryl Streep." Thatcher's Home secretary Douglas Hurd described the dementia storyline as "ghoulish" in an interview with the Evening Standard.

Before passing away on April, 8 2013, Thatcher stated that she did not enjoy watching films or programs about herself.

== Soundtrack ==
1. "Soldiers of the Queen"
2. "MT"
3. "Grocer's Daughter"
4. "Grand Hotel"
5. "Swing Parliament"
6. "Eyelash"
7. "Shall We Dance?"
8. "Denis"
9. "The Great in Great Britain"
10. "Airey Neave"
11. "Discord and Harmony"
12. "The Twins"
13. "Nation of Shopkeepers"
14. "Fiscal Responsibility"
15. "Crisis of Confidence"
16. "Community Charge"
17. "Casta Diva"
18. "The Difficult Decisions"
19. "Exclusion Zone"
20. "Statecraft"
21. "Steady the Buffs"
22. "Prelude No. 1 in C Major, BWV 846" (Johann Sebastian Bach)

The trailer for the film features Madness's ska/pop song "Our House". The teaser trailer features Clint Mansell's theme tune for the science-fiction film Moon.

Not included on the soundtrack album or listings, although credited among the eight songs at the end of the film, is "I'm in Love with Margaret Thatcher" by Burnley punk band Notsensibles, which was re-released as a single due to the publicity. The song appears seventy-five minutes into the film as part of the Falklands War victory celebrations.

== Historical accuracy ==
It is suggested in the film that Thatcher had said goodbye to her friend Airey Neave only a few moments before his assassination by the Irish National Liberation Army and had to be held back from the scene by security officers. In fact, she was not in Westminster at the time of his death and was informed of it while carrying out official duties elsewhere.

The film does not portray any other female Members of Parliament. In fact, during Thatcher's time in Parliament, the total number of female MPs ranged between 19 and 41. Her cabinets are depicted as all-male, but The Baroness Young was a cabinet member between 1981 and 1983, serving as Chancellor of the Duchy of Lancaster and later Lord Privy Seal while also serving as leader of the House of Lords.

The Labour Party leader Michael Foot is depicted as criticising the decision to send a task force to the Falkland Islands, and Thatcher is shown admonishing him in the wake of Britain's victory over Argentina. In fact, Foot supported the decision to send a task force, something for which Thatcher expressed her appreciation. John Campbell noted that her decisions in office became an inspiration for the Labour Party's pro-middle ground policies enacted by Prime Minister Tony Blair.

Campbell also noted that while Thatcher thought a patronising male environment dominated the House of Commons, which the film showed as eliciting the upper-middle-class image she affected early in her political career, the real political environment did not demand this image, and Thatcher did in fact proclaim her ordinary upbringing by a grocer in a small Lincolnshire town when she was running for leader of the Conservative Party.

== Accolades ==
Awards and Nominations
Award	Category	Nominee	Result
84th Academy Awards	Best Actress	Meryl Streep	Won
84th Academy Awards	Best Makeup & Hairstyling	Mark Coulier and J. Roy Helland	Won
1st AACTA International Awards	Best International Actress	Meryl Streep	Won
65th British Academy Film Awards	Best Actress	Meryl Streep	Won
65th British Academy Film Awards	Best Original Screenplay	Abi Morgan	Nominated
65th British Academy Film Awards	Best Supporting Actor	Jim Broadbent	Nominated
65th British Academy Film Awards	Best Makeup and Hair	Marese Langan, Mark Coulier and J. Roy Helland	Won
Boston Society of Film Critics	Best Actress	Meryl Streep	Nominated
Broadcast Film Critics Association Awards	Best Actress	Meryl Streep	Nominated
Broadcast Film Critics Association Awards	Best Makeup	Marese Langan	Nominated
Central Ohio Film Critics Association	Best Actress	Meryl Streep	Nominated
Chicago Film Critics Association Awards	Best Actress	Meryl Streep	Nominated
Dallas-Fort Worth Film Critics Association Awards	Best Actress	Meryl Streep	Nominated
Denver Film Critics Society	Best Actress	Meryl Streep	Won
Golden Globe Awards	Best Actress – Motion Picture Drama	Meryl Streep	Won
Irish Film and Television Awards	Best International Actress	Meryl Streep	Nominated
Irish Film and Television Awards	Best Costume Design	Consolata Boyle	Won
London Critics Circle Film Awards	Best Actress	Meryl Streep	Won
London Critics Circle Film Awards	British Actress of the Year	Olivia Colman	Won
National Society of Film Critics Awards	Best Actress	Meryl Streep	Nominated
New York Film Critics Circle Awards	Best Actress	Meryl Streep	Won
New York Film Critics Online Awards	Best Actress	Meryl Streep	Won
Online Film Critics Society Awards	Best Actress	Meryl Streep	Nominated
Phoenix Film Critics Society Awards	Best Actress	Meryl Streep	Nominated
Satellite Awards	Best Actress – Motion Picture	Meryl Streep	Nominated
Screen Actors Guild Awards	Female Actor in a Leading Role	Meryl Streep	Nominated
Southeastern Film Critics Association Awards	Best Actress	Meryl Streep	Won
Toronto Film Critics Association Awards	Best Actress	Meryl Streep	Nominated
Washington D.C. Area Film Critics Association	Best Actress	Meryl Streep	Nominated

== Home media ==
The Iron Lady was released on DVD in the United States and the United Kingdom on 30 April 2012. The special features in the DVD include Making The Iron Lady, Bonus Featurettes, Recreating the Young Margaret Thatcher, Battle in the House of Commons, Costume Design: Pearls and Power Suits, Denis: The Man Behind the Woman.

== See also ==
- 2011 in film
- List of biographical films
- List of British films of 2011
- List of films set in London
