= Edward Mowll =

Edward Worsfold Mowll (28 December 1881 – 12 June 1964) was an Anglican bishop, the fourth Bishop of Middleton.

Educated at The King's School, Canterbury and Jesus College, Cambridge, he was ordained in 1905 and after a curacy at Leyton became secretary of the Church Pastoral-Aid Society. Incumbencies at Benwell, Southport and Oxford followed, before he became Provost of Bradford Cathedral in 1933. Elevation to the Episcopate followed ten years later and he stayed in this, his final post, until retirement in 1951. A "kind and fatherly man", he died in 1964.

== Family ==
Edward Worsfold Mowll was the fourth son of Edward Worsfold Mowll and his wife, Mary Kingsford. He married firstly Josephine Denham Gildea, eldest daughter of John Randolph Gildea of Weatherfort Hall Co. Mayo Ireland on the 5 June 1909 in St Marylebone Parish Church, London England. Josephine died aged 30 in 1912.

He married secondly Margaret Cicely Skrine, daughter of Henry Mills Skrine and Mary Jane Gore-Langton and great-granddaughter of Victor Hope, 2nd Marquess of Linlithgow, on 4 August 1915 in Holy Trinity Church, Sloan Street, London. Margaret died on the 18th of Oct 1958. He married thirdly Alice Hone Kempson daughter of Edwin Hone Kempson and his wife, Beatrice Alice Garnett in 1959.

Church of England titles
Preceded by Cecil Wilson	Provost of Bradford; 1933–1943	Succeeded by John Tiarks
Preceded by Arthur Alston	Bishop of Middleton; 1943 – 1952	Succeeded by Frank Woods
