= Christopher Hancock (priest) =

Christopher David Hancock (born 18 February 1954) is an Anglican priest and Academic, specialising in culture, ethics, and religion in contemporary geopolitics, particularly Christianity and Confucianism.

== Biography ==
Educated at Highgate School and The Queen's College, Oxford, he was ordained in 1982. He was Curate at Holy Trinity with St John, Leicester and then Chaplain at Magdalene College, Cambridge. He was Associate professor at Virginia Theological Seminary and then Vicar of Holy Trinity, Cambridge from 1994 to 2002 when he became Dean of Bradford, a post he held for two years. After this he was Director for the Centre for the Study of Christianity in China at King's College London and then Director of the Institute for Religion and Society in Asia. He was chaplain of St Peter's College Oxford. He is currently Director of Oxford House Research and a visiting professor at St. Mary's University, London.

== Writings ==
- Hancock, Christopher (2020). Christianity and Confucianism: Culture, Faith and Politics. London: T&T Clark. ISBN 9780567657640
- Hancock, Christopher (2011). Christianity and Confucianism: Traditions in Dialogue. London: Continuum. ISBN 9781847063656

== Notes ==
Church of England titles
Preceded by John Richardson	Dean of Bradford; 2002–2004	Succeeded by David Ison
