= E. C. E. Bourne =

Edward Christopher Eugene Bourne (died 8 April 1967) was a British Anglican vicar and author.

Bourne was brought up in Reading, Berkshire and educated at the local grammar school, Reading School. He then graduated with a BA from Reading University. Bourne decided on holy orders and was educated at Bishops' College, Cheshunt, an Anglican seminary. He was ordained deacon on Trinity Sunday 1938 and on 4 June 1939 he was ordained priest. He served as vicar of St Bartholomew's Church in Reading and was also an honorary chaplain to the Bishop of Oxford, Kenneth Kirk.

In 1945 Bourne was the preacher at a Solemn Eucharist in St Laurence's Church, Reading, that was held to commemorate the tercentenary of William Laud's execution. The tercentenary inspired Bourne to compose an appraisal of Laud's theology and influence, published in 1947 under the title The Anglicanism of William Laud. The reviewer in The English Historical Review said the work was a "useful, vigorous and interesting defence of Laud's ideals in church and state".

Bourne served as sacrist of Blackburn Cathedral and rector of Hedgerley in the diocese of Oxford. In April 1961 Bourne was appointed vicar of the All Hallows-on-the-Wall in the City of London and assistant secretary of the Council for the Care of Churches.

In May 1965 his booklet on church interiors was published, titled Church Planning and Arrangement II. Planning for the Present. Bourne argued that 19th century church interiors, which focused the liturgy on the chancel and reduced the role of the congregation in order to create a sense of awe and mystery, needed reform to correspond to modern patterns of worship. Reform needed to recreate a sense of family worship in which the whole congregation entered into a common, corporate activity.

After Bourne's death in 1967 a service of thanksgiving was held in All Hallows Church, which was addressed by the Bishop of London, Robert Stopford.

== Works ==
- The Anglicanism of William Laud (London: Society for Promoting Christian Knowledge, 1947).
- Sermon Notes on the Prayer Book (London: Society for Promoting Christian Knowledge, 1949).
- 'Cranmer and the Liturgy of 1552', Church Quarterly Review, vol. 155 (1954), pp. 382–390.
- Church Planning and Arrangement II. Planning for the Present (Church Information Office for the Council for the Care of Churches, 1965).
