= Arthur Alston =

Anglican bishop, the third Bishop of Middleton

- Bishop of Middleton
- Alston in January 1932
- Diocese: Diocese of Manchester
- In office: 1938–1943
- Predecessor: Cecil Wilson
- Successor: Edward Mowll
- Other posts: Archdeacon of Hastings (1928–1938); Canon Residentiary of Manchester Cathedral (1938–1943)

Orders
- Ordination: 1896 (deacon); 1897 (priest)
- Consecration: 1938 by William Temple

Personal details
- Born: 30 December 1872 Sandgate, Kent, UK
- Died: 20 February 1954 (aged 81)
- Denomination: Anglican
- Children: 2 sons; 3 daughters
- Education: Clare College, Cambridge

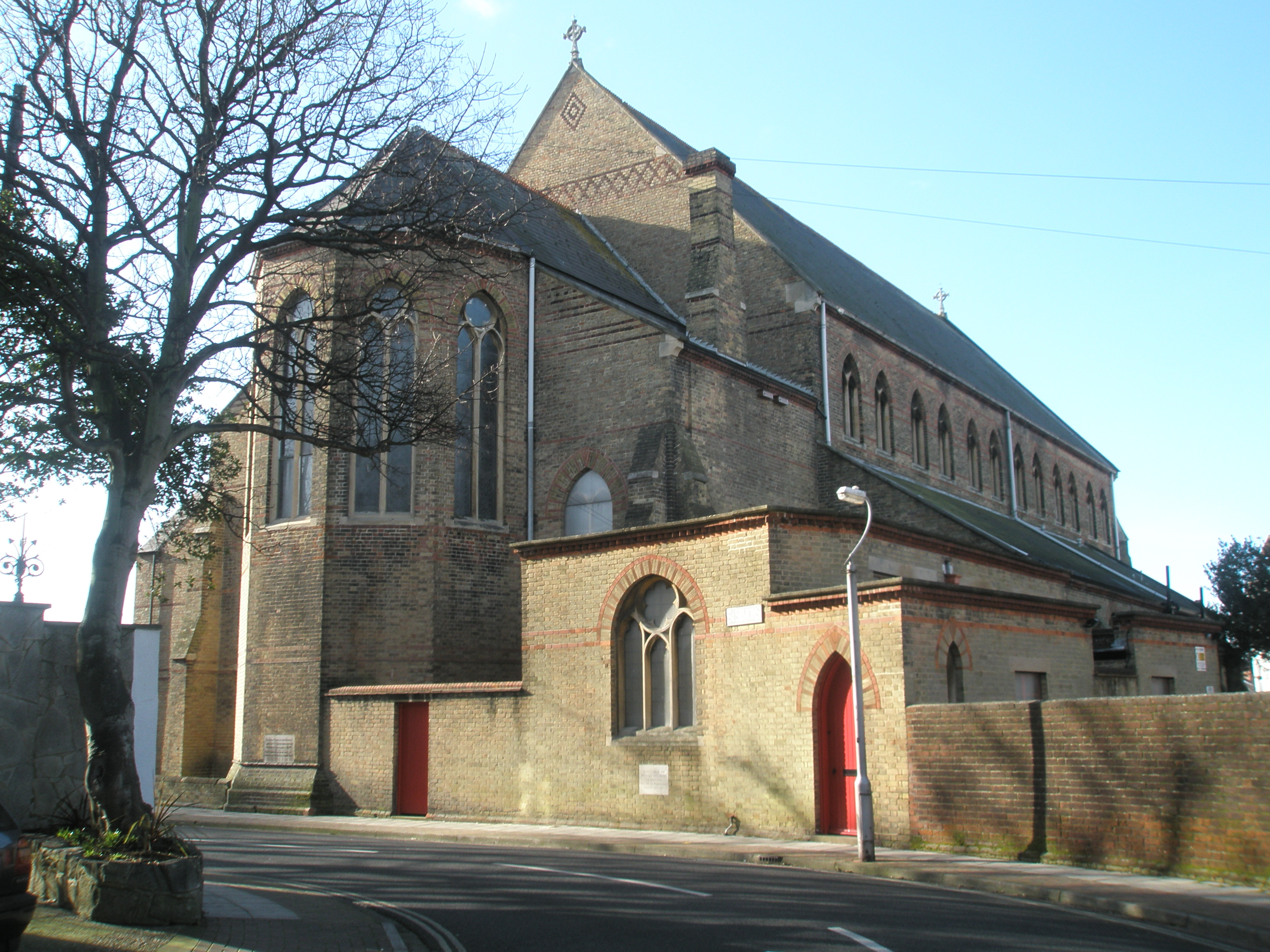
St Simon's, Southsea

Arthur Fawssett Alston (30 December 1872 – 20 February 1954) was an Anglican bishop, the third Bishop of Middleton (a suffragan bishop in the Church of England Diocese of Manchester) from 1938 until 1943.

Born at Sandgate, Kent, the third son of William Evelyn Alston, an army medic and Elizabeth Rouse Alston (nee Fitzgerald), from Sydney, Alston was educated at Clare College, Cambridge (admitted 7 July 1891, matriculated that Michaelmas, graduated Bachelor of Arts {BA} 1894 and proceeded Cambridge Master of Arts {MA Cantab} 1898). He trained for the ministry at Ridley Hall, was ordained a deacon in 1896 and a priest in Peterborough in 1897.

For eleven years following ordination, he served curacies: at St Katherine, Northampton (1896–1898); at Faringdon (1898–1905); and at St Simon's, Southsea (1905–1907). While in Farington, he married in 1900, and had three sons and two daughters — one of those sons, Rex Alston, became a famous cricket commentator. He then held three Yorkshire incumbencies for thirteen years in succession: Vicar of St Matthew's, Hull (1907–1915); of St George's, Leeds (1915–1917/18); and of All Saints', Bradford (1918–1920).

Moving to Sussex in 1920, Alston became Rector of St Leonards-on-Sea, becoming additionally Rural Dean of Hastings in 1926 and Archdeacon of Hastings in 1928; he resigned the rectory and rural-deanery in 1929, remaining archdeacon. He was elected a Proctor in Convocation that year, serving until 1934; he ceased to be Archdeacon of Hastings when in 1938 he moved to Lancashire to become Bishop of Middleton and a Canon Residentiary of Manchester Cathedral, in which posts he remained until his retirement in 1943. He was consecrated a bishop on St Matthias' day (24 February) 1938, by William Temple, Archbishop of York, at York Minster.

Church of England titles
Preceded by Cecil Wilson	Bishop of Middleton; 1938–1943	Succeeded by Edward Mowll
