= John Richardson (Dean of Bradford) =

John Stephen Richardson (born 2 April 1950) is an Anglican priest.

Educated at Haslingden Grammar School and the University of Southampton, he was ordained in 1974 and began his career with a curacy at St Michael's, Bramcote. Next he was Priest in Charge of Emmanuel Church, Radipole and Melcombe Regis; and then Stinsford, Winterborne Monkton and Witcombe. After this he was Vicar of Christ Church, Nailsea and then from 1985 to 1990 he was Adviser in Evangelism for the Diocese of Bath and Wells. In 1990 he became Provost of Bradford, a post he held until 2001. He has been Priest in charge of Holy Trinity, Margate since 2009. In 2016 he became a Priest in Romney Marsh Benefice.

Church of England titles
Preceded by Brandon Jackson	Provost of Bradford; 1990–2000	Succeeded by Himself as Dean of Bradford
Preceded by Himself as Provost of Bradford	Dean of Bradford; 2000–2001	Succeeded by Christopher Hancock
