= Notsensibles =

English punk rock band

- Origin: Burnley, England
- Genre: Punk rock
- Years active: 1978–1982, 1996, 2005–present
- Labels: Bent, Redball, Snotty Snail
- Members: Michael "Haggis" Hargreaves; Roger "Rog Sensible" Rawlinson; Gary Brown; Neil "Nez" Taylor; Kevin "Ploppy" Hemingway
- Past members: Steven "Sage" Hartley, Paul Wright; Scott Wilkinson
- Website: www.notsensibles.net

Notsensibles are a punk rock band from Burnley, England, who had their greatest success with their second single, the tongue-in-cheek "I'm in Love with Margaret Thatcher".

== History ==
The band was formed in 1978 by Michael "Haggis" Hargreaves (vocals), Steven "Sage" Hartley (guitar), Roger "Rog Sensible" Rawlinson (keyboards), Gary Brown (bass), and Kevin "Ploppy" Hemingway (drums). The band explained their approach: "all we want to do is make silly records and play silly gigs".

After releasing the "Death to Disco" single in April 1979, they "celebrated" the election of Margaret Thatcher as Prime Minister later that year with the single "I'm in Love with Margaret Thatcher". Initially self-released in a pressing of 1,000, but reissued on the Snotty Snail label due to continuing demand, the release gave them a No. 8 UK Indie Chart hit at the start of 1980, and the band also recorded a session for John Peel's BBC Radio 1 show. According to one review, the song was: "Meant as neither a pro- nor anti-Thatcher song. It revolved around the idea that no-one was too sacred to get the piss taken out of." Writer Simon Reynolds stated that it "...taps into the side of punk all about not taking anything seriously..." At one performance in 2012 Hargreaves claimed that he had "great reverence for Thatcher" The single's B-side included "Gary Bushell's Band of the Week", which poked fun at the journalist.

In March 1980, the band's only studio album, Instant Classic, was released, reaching No. 16 on the UK Indie Chart, and two singles followed, both indie hits, but not selling as well as their earlier single, before the band split up in March 1982. Cherry Red subsidiary Anagram Records issued a compilation of the band's output, Instant Punk Classics, in 1994.

The band reformed for a performance at the first Wasted/Holidays in the Sun festival in 1996, and reformed more permanently in 2005 with the original line-up. The song "I'm In Love with Margaret Thatcher" was featured in the 2011 film The Iron Lady starring Meryl Streep. The single was re-released on vinyl and download to celebrate its appearance in the film.

In 2013, after Margaret Thatcher's death, "I'm in Love with Margaret Thatcher" received additional publicity when there was an online campaign to boost the record's re-entry into the charts as a download, to counter the promotion of the song "Ding-Dong! The Witch Is Dead" by anti-Thatcher activists. The campaign was initiated by Notsensibles' singer Mike Hargreaves and promoter Suzie Delooze by way of a Facebook page, and was endorsed by Thatcher supporters. Although the Notsensibles' song was reportedly considered "more favourable to Baroness Thatcher", band member Steven Hartley commented that it had been written as a satirical swipe at her. Hargreaves said: "I find it hilarious that Tories have adopted it. The song is a sort-of tribute and sort-of not." The song charted at number 35 on the UK Singles Chart on 12 April 2013.

At the time of the renewed success of the single in 2013, it was reported that Hartley had trained as a doctor and now worked in accident and emergency; Rawlinson was a tree surgeon working for the local council; Hargreaves worked as a nurse; Brown worked in IT; and Hemingway was a businessman.

Hargreaves was the Green Party candidate in Burnley at the 2015 general election.

The band performed at the 2016 & 2017 Rebellion Festival in Blackpool.

== Discography ==
Chart placings shown are from the UK Indie Chart unless otherwise stated.

=== Singles ===
- "Death to Disco" (1979) Bent
- "I'm in Love with Margaret Thatcher" (1979) Redball (reissued (1980) Snotty Snail) (#8); re-promoted 2013 (#35, UK Singles Chart)
- "I Thought You Were Dead" (1980) Snotty Snail (#29)
- "I am the Bishop" (1981) Snotty Snail (#45) (as The Sensibles)
- (I've Just Had Enough) Brother EP (2005) Snotty Snail

=== Albums ===
- Instant Classic (1980) Bent/Snotty Snail (#16)
- Instant Punk Classics (1994) Anagram
