= Andy Bowerman =

British Anglican priest

The Very Reverend Andy Bowerman
- Dean of Bradford
- Church: Church of England
- Diocese: Bradford
- In office: June 2022 – January 2026
- Predecessor: Jerry Lepine
- Successor: Vacant

Orders
- Ordination: 2002 (priest)

Personal details
- Born: Andrew Bowerman; July 1967 (age 58)
- Denomination: Anglicanism

Andy Bowerman (born July 1967) is a British Anglican priest. Between 2022 and 2026, he served as Dean of Bradford.

== Life and career ==
Bowerman was born in July 1967. In the mid-1990s he lived with his wife Ali in Pakistan supporting refugees and those vulnerable to HIV/AIDS, while also supporting house churches. On his return to the United Kingdom, he worked for a national disability charity.

He was ordained in Bradford Cathedral in 2002 after serving as a curate at St Augustine's, Undercliffe, and also served as a mission priest in the city. He served as the chaplain to Bradford City F.C. between 2004 and 2009, and ran the Vicar's Café Bistro in Saltaire. He then became team rector of Wareham in Dorset, and subsequently served as executive director of the Anglican Alliance, while also ministering to parishes in Somerset. He also served for eleven seasons as chaplain to Southampton F.C. In 2018, he took up a position in Dubai in the United Arab Emirates, as a licensed priest of the Diocese of Cyprus and the Gulf and as the South Asia Regional Director of the Mission to Seafarers.

After being appointed Dean of Bradford, he was installed as Dean on 19 June 2022. On 18 January 2026, he left Bradford to take up a position as the first Head of Faith and Community at CREST Education, a Christian education network consisting of a group of schools in Melbourne, Australia.

== Personal life ==
Bowerman is married to Ali, and they have four children. They have also fostered twenty-four foster children.

Church of England titles
Preceded by Jerry Lepine	Dean of Bradford; 2022–2026	Vacant
