= I'm in Love with Margaret Thatcher =

Single by The Notsensibles
- A-side: I'm In Love With Margaret Thatcher; Concerto No. 2
- B-side: Little Boxes; Gary Bushell's Band Of The Week
- Released: October 1979
- Recorded: 12 September 1979
- Genre: Punk rock
- Length: 3:38
- Label: Redball; Snotty Snail
- Songwriter: Notsensibles

The Notsensibles singles chronology
"Death To Disco" (1979)	"I'm in Love with Margaret Thatcher" (1979)	"I Thought You Were Dead" (1980)

"I'm in Love with Margaret Thatcher" is a 1979 single by the English punk band Notsensibles. It was originally written as a tongue-in-cheek comment on Margaret Thatcher, and following her death in 2013 was part of a social media campaign to get it to number one on the UK Singles Chart. The song charted at number 35 on the chart on 12 April 2013.

== Initial release ==
The Notsensibles formed in Burnley, Lancashire, in 1978, to "make silly records and play silly gigs". Their second single, "I'm in Love with Margaret Thatcher", was issued in October 1979, five months after Thatcher's win in the UK General Election. Initially self-released in a pressing of 1,000 on the Redball label, but reissued on the Snotty Snail label due to continuing demand, the release gave them a No. 8 UK Indie Chart hit at the start of 1980. According to one review, the song was: "Meant as neither a pro- nor anti-Thatcher song. It revolved around the idea that no-one was too sacred to get the piss taken out of." Writer Simon Reynolds stated that it "...taps into the side of punk all about not taking anything seriously..." The record sleeve showed a photograph of Thatcher apparently giving a V sign to the camera. The single's B-side included "Gary Bushell's Band of the Week", which poked fun at the journalist.

The song was featured in the 2011 film The Iron Lady starring Meryl Streep, and was re-released on vinyl and download at that time.

== After Thatcher's death ==
After the death of Margaret Thatcher in April 2013 there was a social media campaign to raise "Ding-Dong! The Witch Is Dead" from The Wizard of Oz to number one in the UK Singles Chart. Following its rapid rise up the charts, there was a rival campaign to promote "I'm in Love with Margaret Thatcher". The song reached number 35 on the charts, while its rival campaign Ding-Dong! The Witch Is Dead made it to number 2. The campaign was initially understood to have been started by Thatcher supporters, and was endorsed by former Conservative MP and author Louise Mensch, but in fact was initiated by Notsensibles' singer Mike Hargreaves and promoter Suzie Delooze by way of a Facebook page.

The Notsensibles' song was reportedly considered "more favourable to Baroness Thatcher", and at one performance in 2012, Hargreaves claimed that he had "great reverence for Thatcher". Hargreaves later said: "I find it hilarious that Tories have adopted it. The song is a sort-of tribute and sort-of not." Band member Steven Hartley commented that it had been written as a satirical swipe at her, and also said: "It was tongue-in-cheek - a bit of fun... a throw-away ditty... We were never rebels. We were never a sneering punk rock band - it was all a bit of light-hearted fun to us." The band's promoter Suzie Delooze said: "Whether you like her or not the band thought that their song was more tongue-in-cheek and not so horrible towards the lady and her family. Hopefully, it will reach a much wider audience and be more respectful than other songs."

== Chart performance ==
Chart (2013)	Peak position
Scotland Singles (OCC)	71
UK Singles (OCC)	35
UK Indie (OCC)	7
