= David Ison =

Former Dean of St Paul's Cathedral, London

The Very Reverend David Ison KCVO
- Dean of St Paul's
- Church: Church of England
- Diocese: Diocese of London
- In office: 2012–2022
- Predecessor: Graeme Knowles
- Successor: Andrew Tremlett
- Other post: Dean of Bradford (2005–2012)

Orders
- Ordination: 1980 (priest)

Personal details
- Born: 15 September 1954 (age 72)
- Denomination: Anglican
- Spouse: Hilary Powell (m. 1977)
- Children: 4
- Education: King's College London

David John Ison (born 15 September 1954) is a retired Church of England priest. From 2012 until he retired in 2022, he was the Dean of St Paul's Cathedral in the Diocese of London.

== Early life and education ==
David Ison, son of Richard Lea Ison, was educated at the University of Leicester (BA 1976), the University of Nottingham (BA 1978) and St John's College, Nottingham (Diploma of Biblical Studies 1979). He undertook further studies in church history at King's College London where his 1984 PhD was entitled "The Constantinian Oration to the saints : authorship and background".

== Ordained ministry ==
Ison was ordained as a priest in 1980. He began his ordained ministry as a curate at St Nicholas and St Luke's Deptford. From 1985 to 1988 he was a tutor at the Church Army Training College before being appointed vicar of St Philip's Potters Green in the West Midlands until 1993. Later, he was Canon Chancellor at Exeter Cathedral and the officer for Continuing Ministerial Education in the Diocese of Exeter.

Ison became Dean of Bradford in September 2005. On 6 March 2012, it was announced that he was to become the next Dean of St Paul's Cathedral from 25 May 2012, succeeding Graeme Knowles, which he did by Letters Patent dated 11 May 2012 granting him "the Deanery of Her Majesty’s Cathedral Church of St Paul in London". On 5 June 2012, Ison led the prayers at the service of thanksgiving marking the Diamond Jubilee of Queen Elizabeth II. The next year, he gave the bidding at the funeral of Margaret Thatcher.

On 28 July 2021, it was announced that Ison was to retire in September 2022.

On 30 May 2023 he was appointed a Knight Commander of the Royal Victorian Order (KCVO) by King Charles III.

=== Views ===
Ison is an open evangelical and supports same-sex partnerships.

== Personal life ==
In 1977, Ison married Hilary Margaret Powell who is also ordained in the Church of England. They have two sons and two daughters.

Ison has an identical twin brother, Keith Ison, who was the Head of Medical Physics at Guy's and St Thomas' NHS Foundation Trust and is a past president of the Institute of Physics and Engineering in Medicine.

== Styles ==
- Mr David Ison (1954–1980)
- The Revd David Ison (1980–1984)
- The Revd Dr David Ison (1984–2005)
- The Very Revd Dr David Ison (2005–2022)
- The Very Revd Dr David Ison, KCVO (2023–present)

Church of England titles
Preceded by Christopher Hancock	Dean of Bradford; 2004–2012	Succeeded by Jerry Lepine
Preceded by Graeme Knowles	Dean of St Paul's; 2012–2022	Succeeded by Andrew Tremlett
