= Richard Parsons (bishop) =

Anglican bishop and scholar

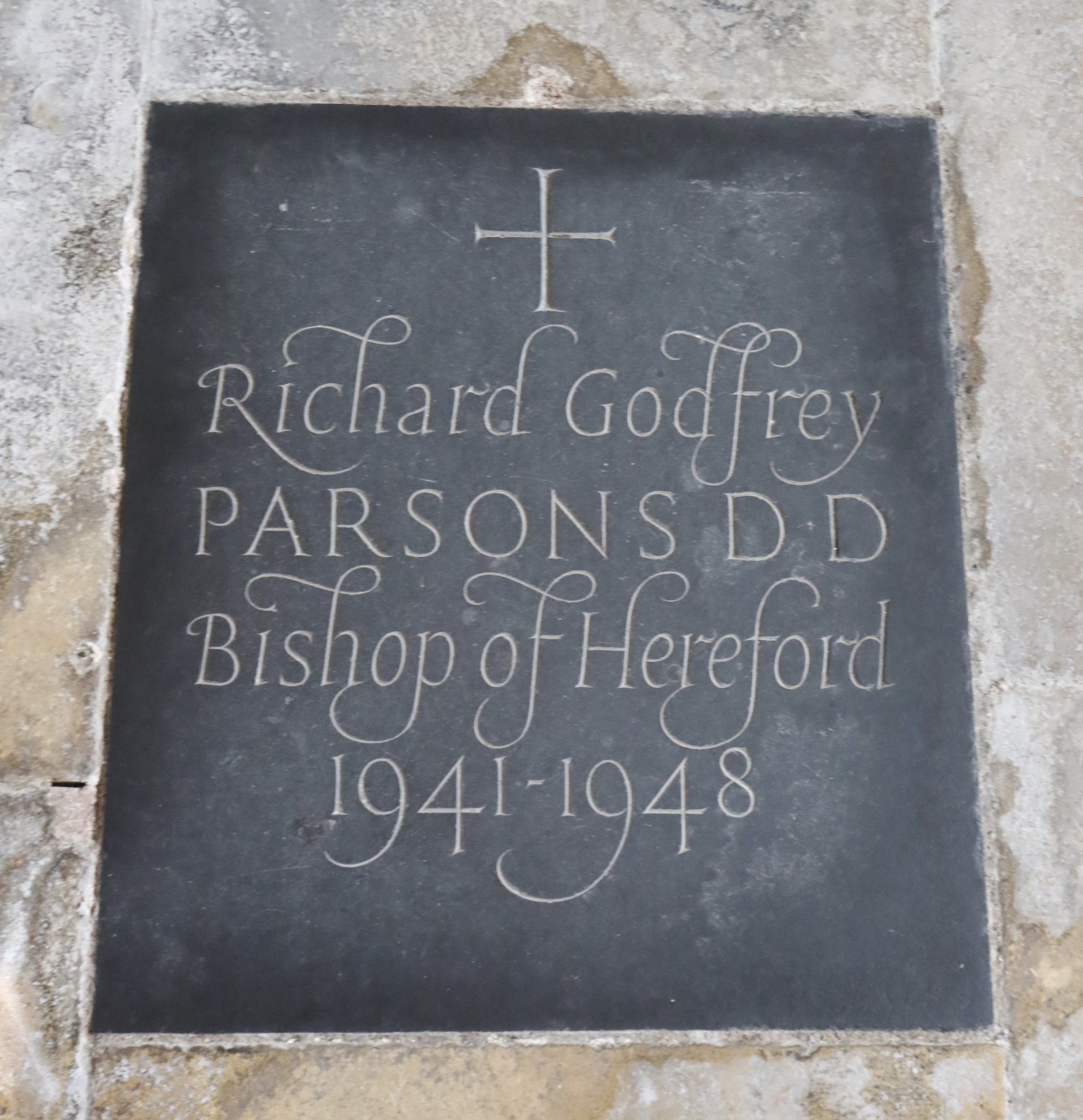
Memorial in Hereford Cathedral

Richard Godfrey Parsons (12 November 1882–26 December 1948) was an Anglican bishop who served in three dioceses during the first half of the 20th century, and a renowned liberal scholar.

Parsons was born into a Lancashire family on 12 November 1882 and educated at Durham School and Magdalen College, Oxford. Ordained priest in 1907 he was a curate at Hampstead before four years as Chaplain at University College, Oxford. and Principal of Wells Theological College from 1911-16. He served for one year as a Temporary Chaplain to the Forces. Married with two children, he expressed a preference to remain 'at home' and he was posted to '2 General Hospital, London'. He was described as 'Roundfaced'.

Ideally suited to pastoral work, he became Bishop of Middleton, a suffragan bishop appointment, in 1927. During this period he was one of several clerics who made a major contribution to the revision of the Book of Common Prayer. A man with much sympathy to the poor he enjoyed his time at the Diocese of Southwark (1932–41) before translation to Hereford; he legally took the See of Hereford at the confirmation of his election on 12 November 1941 at St Margaret's, Westminster. A devoted family man, he married Dorothy Streeter in 1912. His son died in the siege of Tobruk and he died himself on 26 December 1948 aged 66.

Church of England titles
New title	Bishop of Middleton; 1927–1932	Succeeded by Cecil Wilson
Preceded by Cyril Garbett	Bishop of Southwark; 1932–1941	Succeeded by Bertram Simpson
Preceded by Charles Lisle Carr	Bishop of Hereford; 1941–1948	Succeeded by Tom Longworth
