= Cecil Wilson (bishop of Middleton) =

Anglican bishop

Cecil Wilfred Wilson (10 May 1875 – c. 13 August 1937) was an Anglican bishop, the second Bishop of Middleton from 1932 until 1937.

Educated at Norwich School and Corpus Christi College, Cambridge, he was Vicar of St James's, Holloway, then St Mary's, Swansea (where he was also a Canon of Brecon Cathedral) and finally Archdeacon of Bradford. During his last year before ascending to the Episcopate he was also the inaugural Provost of Bradford Cathedral. A prominent Freemason, he had a "sympathetic understanding of the poor".

The bishop was discovered dead at home by his son-in-law on 16 August, after returning the prior Thursday, 12 August, from a lengthy vacation with his family, who had remained behind. Milk delivered that Thursday had been brought into the house but not milk left the next day. He had recently complained of heart problems.

Church of England titles
Preceded by Inaugural appointment	Provost of Bradford; 1930–1931	Succeeded by Edward Mowll
Preceded by Richard Parsons	Bishop of Middleton; 1932–1937	Succeeded by Arthur Alston
