= Ted Wickham =

Bishop of Middleton

Edward Ralph Wickham (called Ted; 3 November 1911 – 1994) was a long serving Bishop of Middleton.

Wickham was educated at the University of London and was ordained: made deacon in Advent 1938 (18 December) and ordained priest the following St Thomas' Day (21 December 1939) — both times by Harold Bilbrough, Bishop of Newcastle, at Newcastle Cathedral. His first post after curacy was as chaplain at the Royal Ordnance factory at Swynnerton. His subsequent experience was largely based in industrial areas and included a nine-year stint as a canon residentiary at Sheffield Cathedral.

He was consecrated a bishop on 30 November 1959, by Michael Ramsey, Archbishop of York, at York Minster. He then served as Bishop of Middleton (a suffragan bishop of the Diocese of Manchester) until his retirement in 1982. A noted ecumenicist he wrote widely on the churches' role in a changing world. His published works include Church and People in an Industrial City.

Church of England titles
Preceded by Robert Nelson	Bishop of Middleton; 1959–1982	Succeeded by Donald Tytler
