= Jerry Lepine =

Jeremy John "Jerry" Lepine (born 24 April 1956) is a British Church of England priest. He was Dean of Bradford from 2013 to 2021.

Educated at St John's College, Nottingham and ordained in 1985, he began his career with a curacy at Trinity St Michael, Harrow. He was Team Vicar at Horley from 1988 to 1995; and Evangelism Advisor for the Croydon Area Mission Team from then until 2002 when he became Rector of St Leonard, Wollaton, a post he held until his appointment as Dean of Bradford.

Church of England titles
Preceded by David Ison	Dean of Bradford; 2013–2021	Succeeded by Andy Bowerman
