= Robert Nelson (bishop) =

Robert Nelson (26 June 1913 – 3 June 1959) was the sixth Bishop of Middleton from 1958 until his death a year later.

Born on 26 June 1913 and educated at Carlisle Grammar School and Leeds University, he was ordained in 1936. After curacies at Grange-over-Sands and Leeds he became Vicar of Barrow-in-Furness before a nine-year stint as Rector of Liverpool. A noted broadcaster, he died on 3 June 1959.

== Notes ==
Church of England titles
Preceded by Frank Woods	Bishop of Middleton; 1958 – 1959	Succeeded by Edward Ralph Wickham
