= Death and funeral of Margaret Thatcher =

2013 death and funeral in London, England

Death and funeral of The Baroness Thatcher
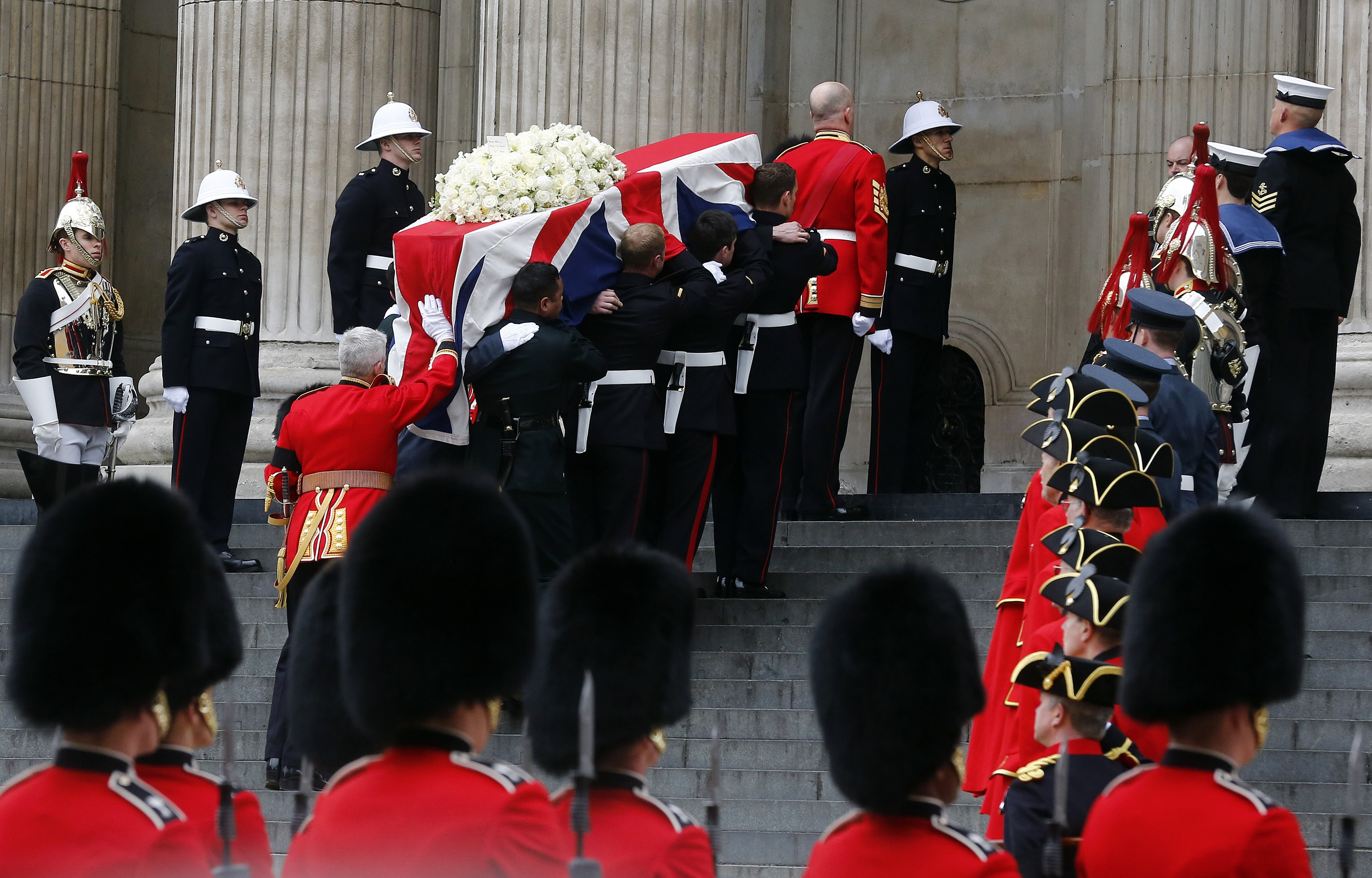
- Margaret Thatcher's coffin being carried up the steps of St Paul's Cathedral
- Date: 11:28, 8 April 2013 (+01:00) (death); 11:00, 17 April 2013 (+01:00) (funeral service)
- Venue: St Paul's Cathedral
- Location: London, England; 51°30′50″N 0°05′54″W
- Type: Ceremonial funeral
- Participants: Elizabeth II; Prince Philip, Duke of Edinburgh; John Major; Tony Blair; Gordon Brown; David Cameron
- Burial: Royal Hospital Chelsea
- Cremation: Mortlake Crematorium

On 8 April 2013, former British prime minister Margaret Thatcher, Baroness Thatcher, died of a stroke at the Ritz Hotel, London, at the age of 87. On 17 April, she was honoured with a ceremonial funeral. Due to polarised opinions about her achievements and legacy, the reaction to her death was mixed across the UK, including contrasting praise, criticism, and celebrations of her life as well as celebrations of her death.

The funeral included a formal procession through Central London followed by a church service at St Paul's Cathedral attended by Queen Elizabeth II. It cost around £3.6 million, including £3.1 million for security. Thatcher's body was subsequently cremated at Mortlake Crematorium.

Her ashes were buried at the Royal Hospital Chelsea, London, in a private ceremony on 28 September 2013, alongside those of her husband, Denis.

== Illness and death ==
Thatcher suffered several small strokes in 2002 and was advised by her doctors not to engage in any more public speaking; on 23 March she announced the cancellation of her planned speaking engagements and that she would accept no more. Despite her illness, she pre-recorded a eulogy for the funeral of Ronald Reagan in June 2004. She attended her 80th birthday celebration in 2005 with Queen Elizabeth II and 650 other guests. However, her health continued to decline; she was briefly hospitalised in 2008 after feeling unwell during a dinner, and again after falling and fracturing her arm in 2009. In June 2009, her daughter, Carol, spoke to the press about her mother's struggle with dementia.

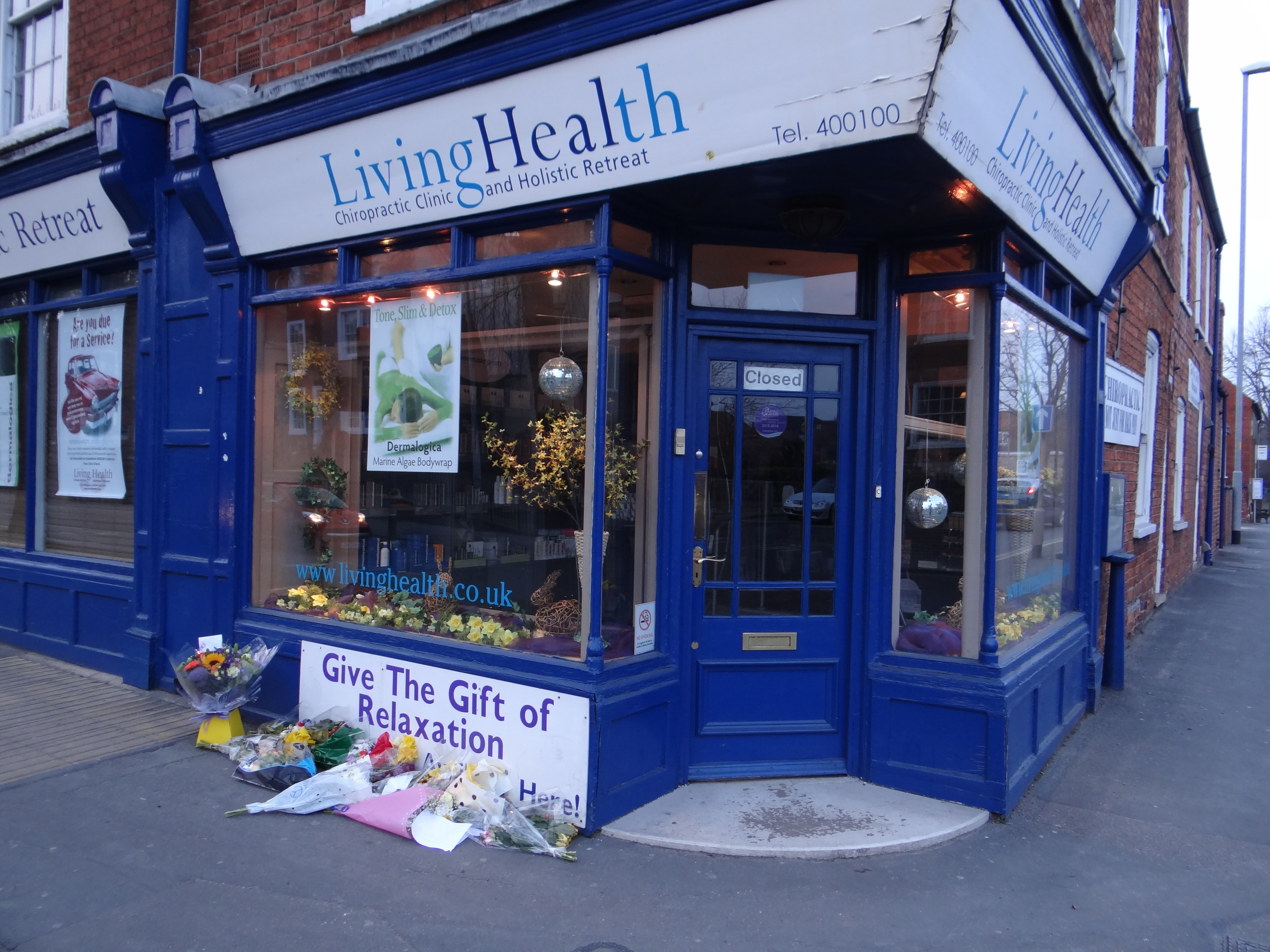
Floral tributes outside Thatcher's birthplace in Grantham, Lincolnshire

Thatcher died at 11:28 BST (10:28 UTC) on 8 April 2013, at the Ritz Hotel in Piccadilly after suffering a stroke. She had been staying in a suite there since December 2012, after having difficulty using the stairs at her house in Chester Square. She had been invited to stay at the Ritz by its owners David and Frederick Barclay, who were long-time supporters. Lord Bell, Thatcher's spokesman, confirmed her death to the Press Association, who issued the first wire report to newsrooms at 12:47 BST (11:47 UTC). The Union Flag was flown at half-mast at Downing Street, Buckingham Palace, Parliament and other palaces, and flowers were laid outside her home.

== Funeral ==
=== Planning ===
Planning for the funeral began in 2009. The committee was initially chaired by Malcolm Ross, former Master of the Royal Household. Following the 2010 general election that brought the coalition government into power, Cabinet Office minister Francis Maude was made the new chairman of the committee; the codename given to the plans was changed to True Blue from Iron Bridge to provide it with "a more Conservative feel".

Details of Thatcher's funeral had been agreed with her. She had chosen the hymns, among them Charles Wesley's "Love Divine, All Loves Excelling", which reflected her Methodist upbringing. She also stipulated that the prime minister of the day would read a lesson from the Bible.

Thatcher had previously vetoed a state funeral; reasons included cost, parliamentary deliberation, and that it suggested similar stature to Winston Churchill (with which she disagreed). Instead, with her and her family's agreement, she received a ceremonial funeral, including military honours, a guard of honour, and a service at St Paul's Cathedral, London. The arrangements were similar to those for Queen Elizabeth the Queen Mother in 2002 and for Diana, Princess of Wales, in 1997, except with greater military honours as she had been a former head of government. Thatcher's body was cremated after the funeral, following her wishes.

Some of Thatcher's supporters expressed disappointment that she would not be given a full state funeral. However, Peter Oborne in The Daily Telegraph argued that the scale of the ceremony amounted to a de facto state funeral and disagreed with the status of a ceremonial funeral. Oborne contended that the Queen's attendance might be seen as "partisan" since she had not attended Labour prime minister Clement Attlee's funeral in 1967.

The scale and the cost to the taxpayer of the funeral, inaccurately estimated before the event at up to £10 million in total, was also criticised by public figures including the Bishop of Grantham, Tim Ellis; Lord Prescott and George Galloway. Thatcher's family agreed to meet part of the cost of the funeral, with the government funding the remainder. After the event, it was reported by 10 Downing Street that in fact the total public spending on the funeral was £3.6 million, of which £3.1 million (86 per cent) had been the costs of police and security.

Anticipating possible protests and demonstrations along the route, police mounted one of the largest security operations since the 2012 Summer Olympics. Against the backdrop of the bombings at the Boston Marathon two days earlier, it was announced that over 4,000 police officers would be deployed. In the event, the crowds were peaceful, with supporters drowning out most of the scattered protests with cheers and applause. A few hundred people turned up to protest at Ludgate Circus, some shouting and others turning their backs, with other protesters picketing along the route.

=== Day of the funeral and aftermath ===
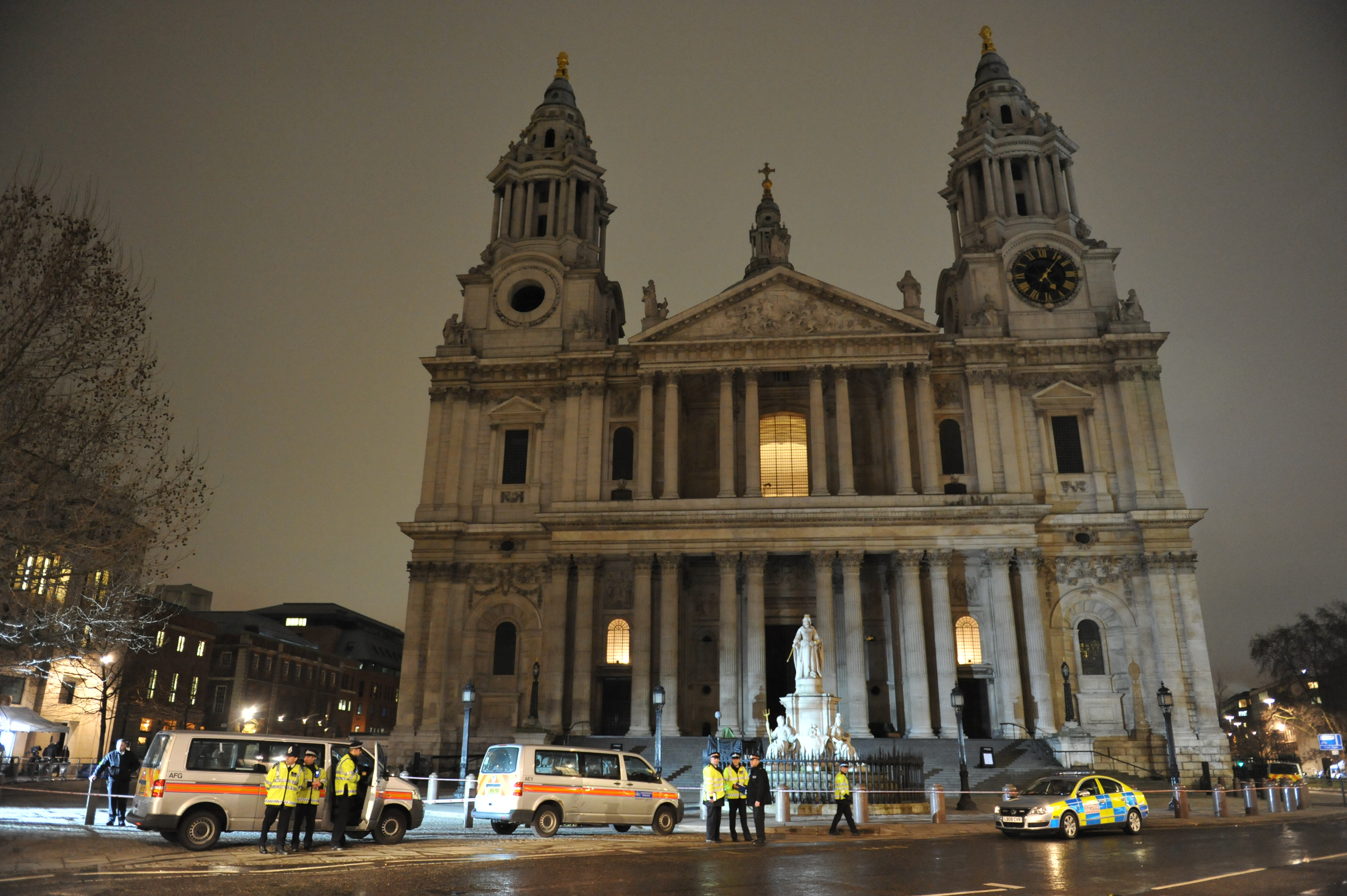
Security checks prior to the service in the early hours of 17 April 2013

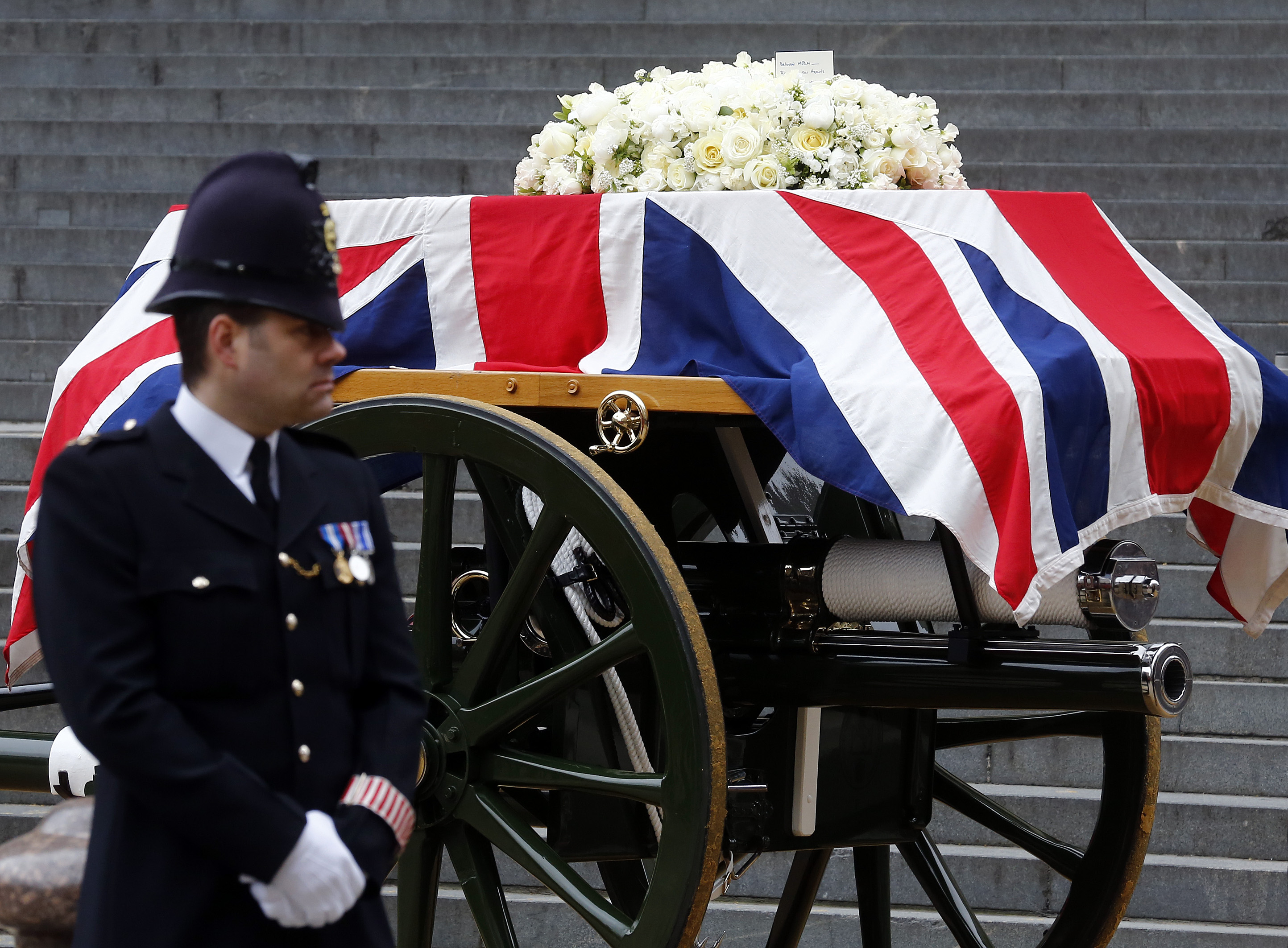
Thatcher's Union Flag-draped coffin being carried by a gun carriage

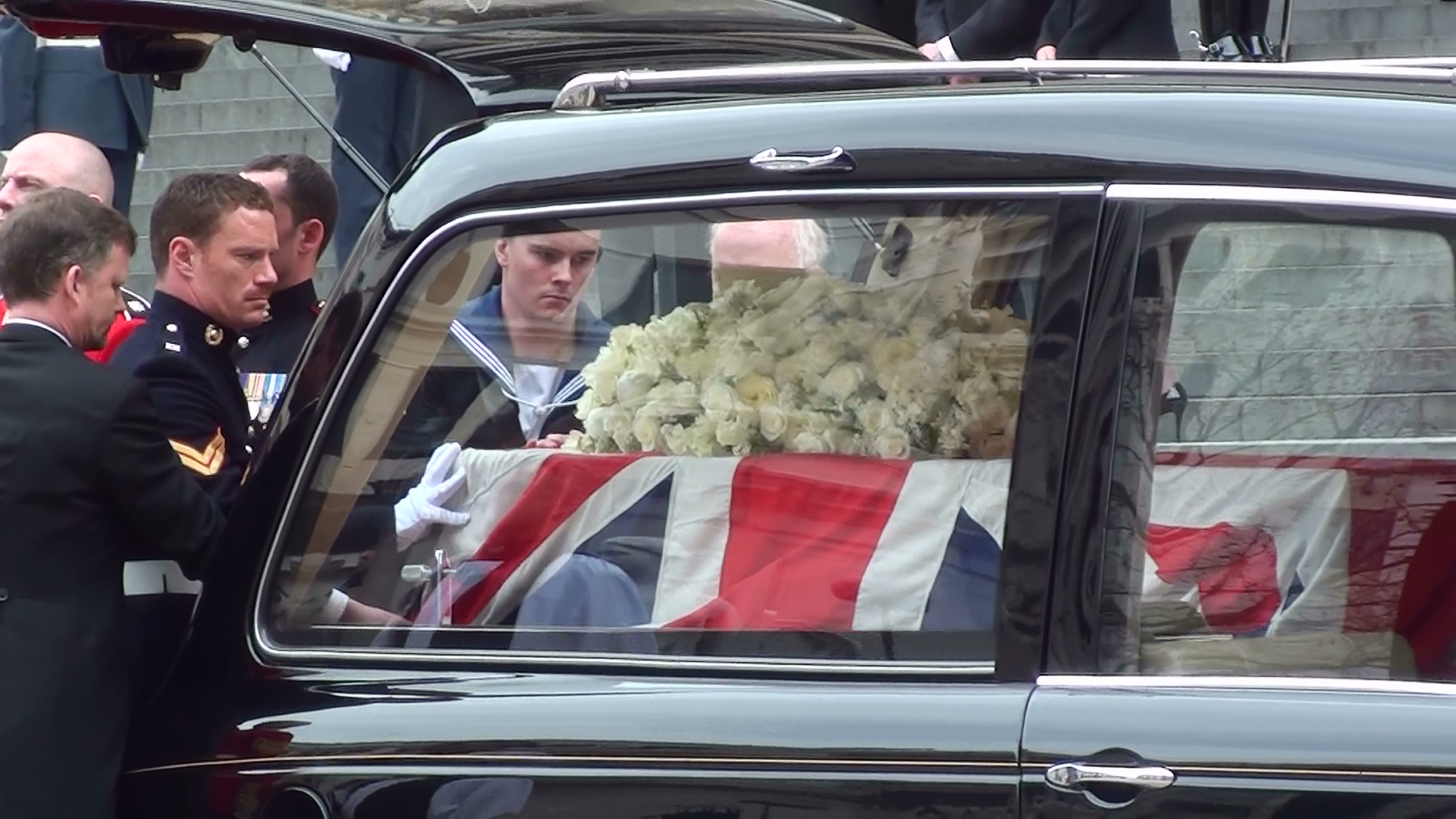
Coffin being placed in hearse after the funeral service

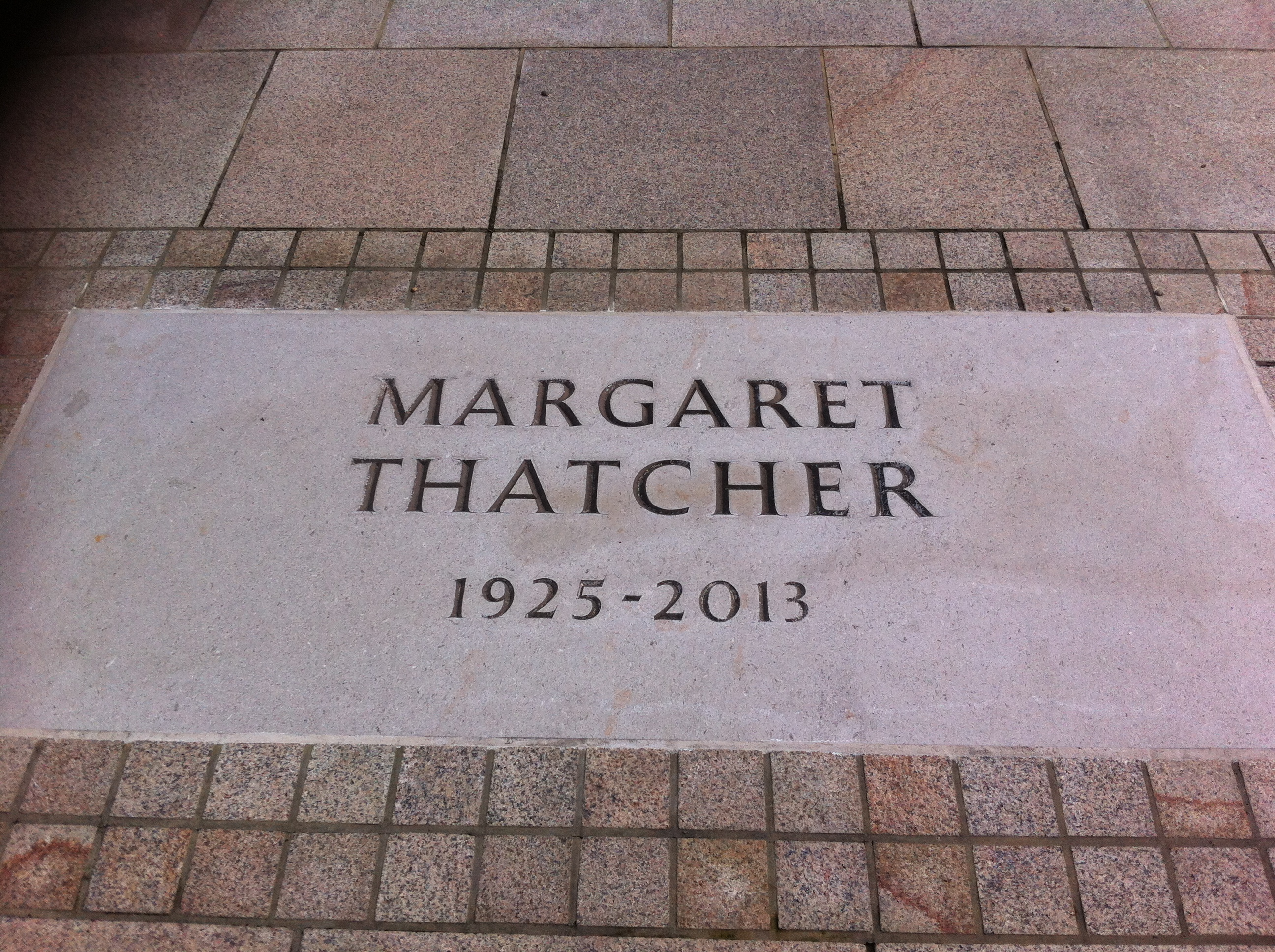
Gravestone at the Royal Hospital Chelsea (51.4874°N 0.1582°W)

Flags along Whitehall were lowered to half-mast at 08:00, and as a rare mark of respect the chimes of the Palace of Westminster's Great Clock, including Big Ben, were silenced from 09:45 for the duration of the funeral. At the Tower of London, a 105 mm gun fired every 60 seconds during the procession. Muffled bells tolled at St Margaret's Church at Westminster Abbey, and at St Paul's.

The funeral cortège commenced at the Houses of Parliament, where Thatcher's coffin had lain overnight in the Chapel of St Mary Undercroft beneath St Stephen's Hall at the Palace of Westminster. The funeral procession was as follows:

- From the Palace of Westminster, a motor hearse travelled down Whitehall, across Trafalgar Square and down the Strand and Aldwych;
- After a blessing at St Clement Danes, the central church of the RAF, at the eastern end of the Strand, the coffin was transferred to a gun carriage drawn by the King's Troop, Royal Horse Artillery;
- The cortège continued along Fleet Street and Ludgate Hill before it arrived at St Paul's Cathedral;
- At St Paul's, the coffin was carried into the cathedral by members of the Armed Forces and borne down the nave preceded by her grandchildren, Michael and Amanda, who carried cushions bearing Thatcher's insignia of the Order of the Garter and the Order of Merit.

The bidding (introductory words) was given by the Dean of St Paul's, David Ison. Amanda Thatcher gave the first Bible reading; the second reading was given by the prime minister, David Cameron. The Bishop of London, Richard Chartres, also gave an address.

It was expected that there would be about 2,300 mourners within St Paul's for the funeral. Invitations were decided by the Thatcher family and their representatives, together with the government and the Conservative Party. The guest list included her family and friends; former colleagues, including former British Cabinet members; and personal staff who worked closely with her. Invitations were also sent to representatives of some 200 countries and to all five living presidents of the United States, although Jimmy Carter later clarified that he did not receive an invitation; and all four living British prime ministers. Two current heads of state, 11 serving prime ministers and 17 serving foreign ministers were present.

The Queen led mourners at the funeral. It was only the second time in the Queen's reign that she attended the funeral of one of her prime ministers; the only other time was for that of Churchill in 1965. Her presence at the funeral was interpreted by some as having elevated "the status [of the funeral] to that of state funeral in all but name". The Queen and her husband Prince Philip, Duke of Edinburgh, were led in and out of the cathedral by the Lord Mayor of London, Roger Gifford, bearing the Mourning Sword. The sword had last been used at Churchill's funeral.

Following the church service, the coffin was taken by motor hearse from St Paul's to Mortlake Crematorium, where Denis Thatcher had been cremated nearly a decade before. The cremation service was only attended by the immediate family. On 28 September 2013, a private and unpublicised service for Thatcher was held in the All Saints Chapel of the Royal Hospital Chelsea's Margaret Thatcher Infirmary. Afterwards, Thatcher's ashes were interred in the hospital's grounds, next to her husband's.

== Reactions ==
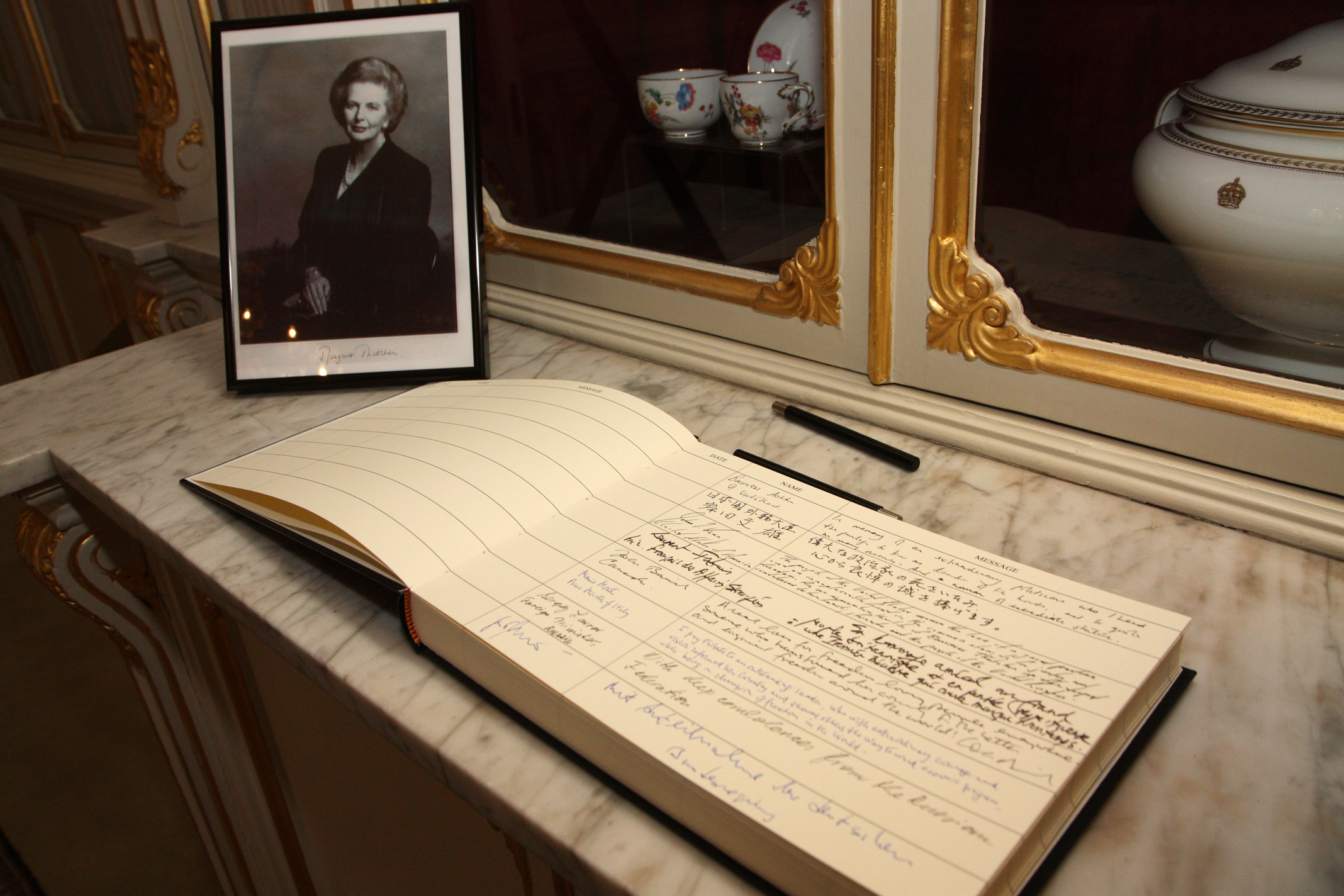
Condolence book in London, 11 April 2013

=== Family ===
On 10 April, two days following Thatcher's death, her son Sir Mark Thatcher spoke of his mother's death on the steps of her Chester Square home. He told journalists that his family was "proud and equally grateful" that the Queen would attend her funeral service, whose presence he said his mother would be "greatly honoured as well as humbled by". He expressed gratitude for all the messages of support and condolences from far and wide. Three days later on 13 April her daughter Carol thanked US president Barack Obama and others for their tributes and all those who had sent messages of sympathy and support.

=== Domestic ===
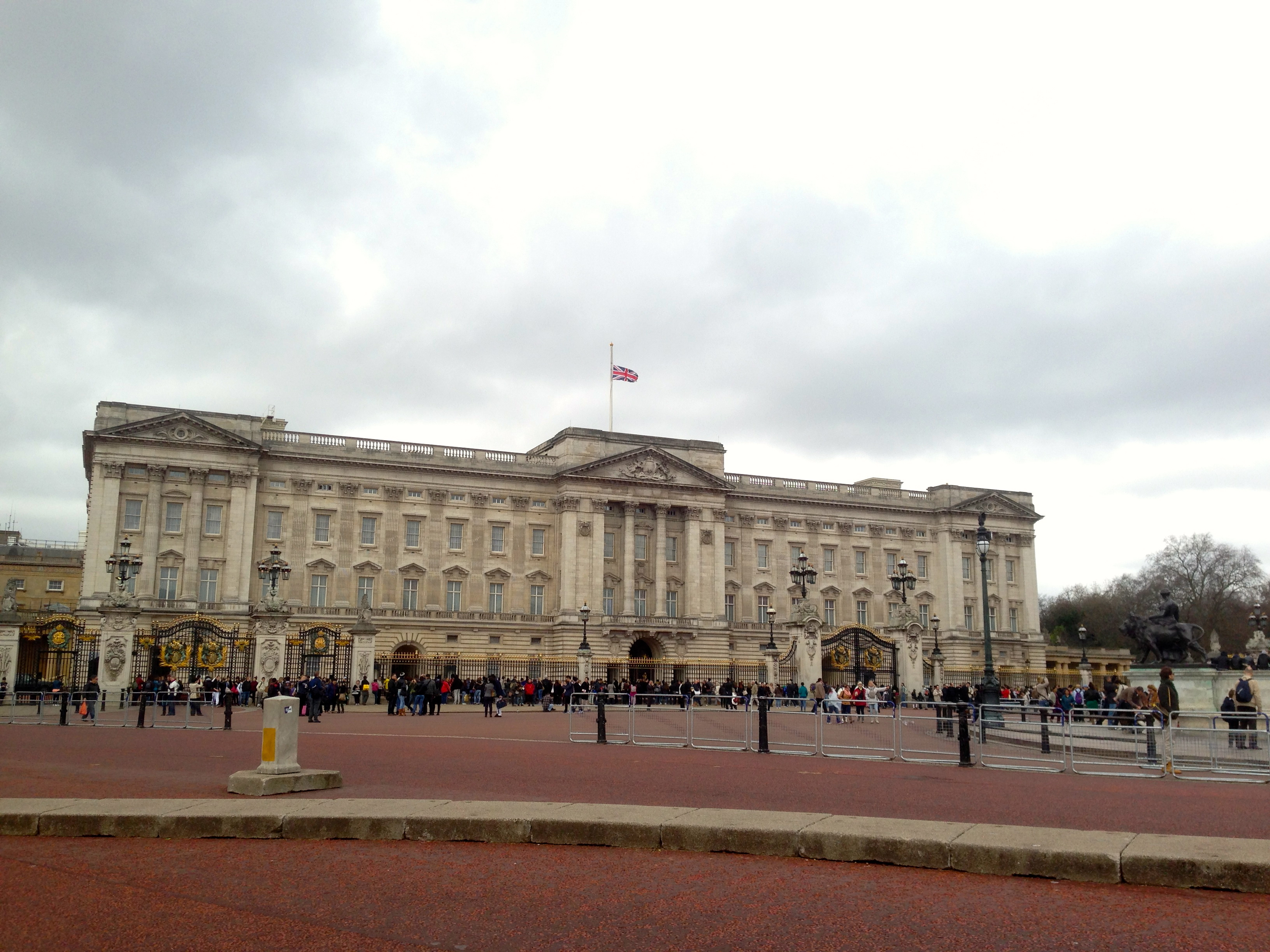
The Union Flag at Buckingham Palace flying at half-mast on the day of the funeral, 17 April 2013

==== Political reaction ====
A Buckingham Palace spokesman reported the Queen's sadness on hearing the news of her death and that she would send a private message to the family.

Prime Minister and Conservative Party leader David Cameron cut short a visit to Spain and ordered flags to be flown at half-mast. He issued a statement lamenting Britain's loss of "a great prime minister, a great leader, a great Briton". The deputy prime minister and leader of the Liberal Democrats, Nick Clegg, eulogised Thatcher as having defined modern British politics and that, while she may have "divided opinion" during her time, there would be scant disagreement about "the strength of her personality and the radicalism of her politics".

Leader of the Opposition and Labour Party leader Ed Miliband said that she would be remembered for having "reshaped the politics of a whole generation [and moving] the centre ground of British politics" and for her stature in the world. He said that, although the Labour Party had disagreed with much of what she did, "we can disagree and also greatly respect her political achievements and her personal strength".

John Major, her successor as prime minister, credited Thatcher's leadership with turning Britain around in large measure: "Her reforms of the economy, trades union law, and her recovery of the Falkland Islands elevated her above normal politics." Former Labour prime ministers Tony Blair and Gordon Brown said that even those who disagreed with her would admire her strength of character, her convictions, her view of Britain's place in the world and her contribution to British national life.

Scottish first minister and SNP leader Alex Salmond acknowledged that "Margaret Thatcher was a truly formidable prime minister whose policies defined a political generation". Plaid Cymru leader Leanne Wood, while expressing sympathy to her family, criticised her policies' effects on Wales.

Former Green Party leader Caroline Lucas voiced regret that, although Thatcher was the first female prime minister, "she did little for women either inside or outside the House of Commons". UKIP leader Nigel Farage expressed his sympathy in a tweet, paying homage to "a great patriotic lady".

==== Wider reaction and criticism ====
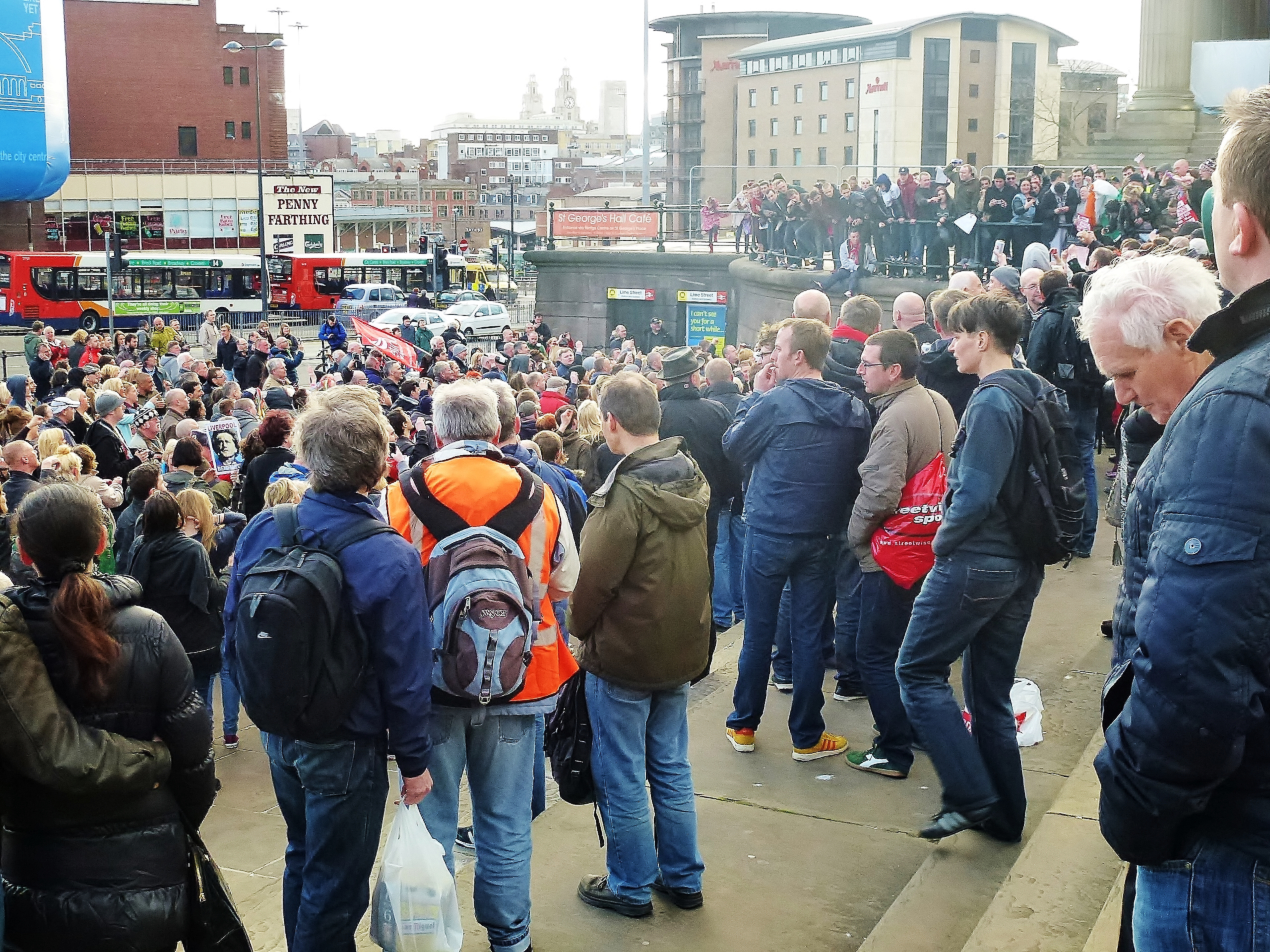
Demonstration in Liverpool on the day of the funeral, 17 April 2013

The House of Commons was recalled to hold a special session discussing Thatcher's legacy. While current and former cabinet ministers struck a conciliatory tone in their speeches, some in the Labour Party attacked Thatcher's legacy. Over half of all Labour MPs chose to boycott the tribute to Thatcher, with many saying it would have been hypocritical for them to honour her as their constituents continued to suffer from some of the decisions she made. Former MP Tony Benn, former London mayor Ken Livingstone and Paul Kenny, general-secretary of the GMB trade union, stated that her policies were divisive and her legacy involved "the destruction of communities, the elevation of personal greed over social values and legitimising the exploitation of the weak by the strong"; however, Benn did acknowledge some of her personal qualities.

Many reactions were unsympathetic, particularly from her former opponents. Residents in Orgreave, South Yorkshire, site of the Battle of Orgreave between striking coal miners and police in June 1984, declared that their village had been "decimated by Thatcher". The Associated Press quoted a number of miners as responding to her death simply with "good riddance". Chris Kitchen, general-secretary of the National Union of Mineworkers, stated that miners would "not be shedding a tear for her". A mock funeral was held in the pit village of Goldthorpe in South Yorkshire, in which an effigy of Thatcher was burned alongside the word "scab" spelt out in flowers. Anarcho-punk band Chumbawamba issued an EP titled In Memoriam: Margaret Thatcher, which had been available for pre-sale since 2005 and which they described as "a small and perfectly-formed segment of the celebrations".

Spontaneous street parties were held in Glasgow, Brixton, Liverpool, Bristol, Leeds, Belfast, Cardiff and elsewhere; Glasgow City Council advised citizens to stay away from street parties organised without their involvement or consent out of safety concerns. A larger demonstration with around 3,000 protesters took place at Trafalgar Square in London on 13 April. Graffiti was posted calling for her to "rot in hell". Socialist film director Ken Loach suggested privatising her funeral and tendering it for the cheapest bid. The Daily Telegraph website closed comments on all articles related to her death due to what editor Tony Gallagher described as abuse.

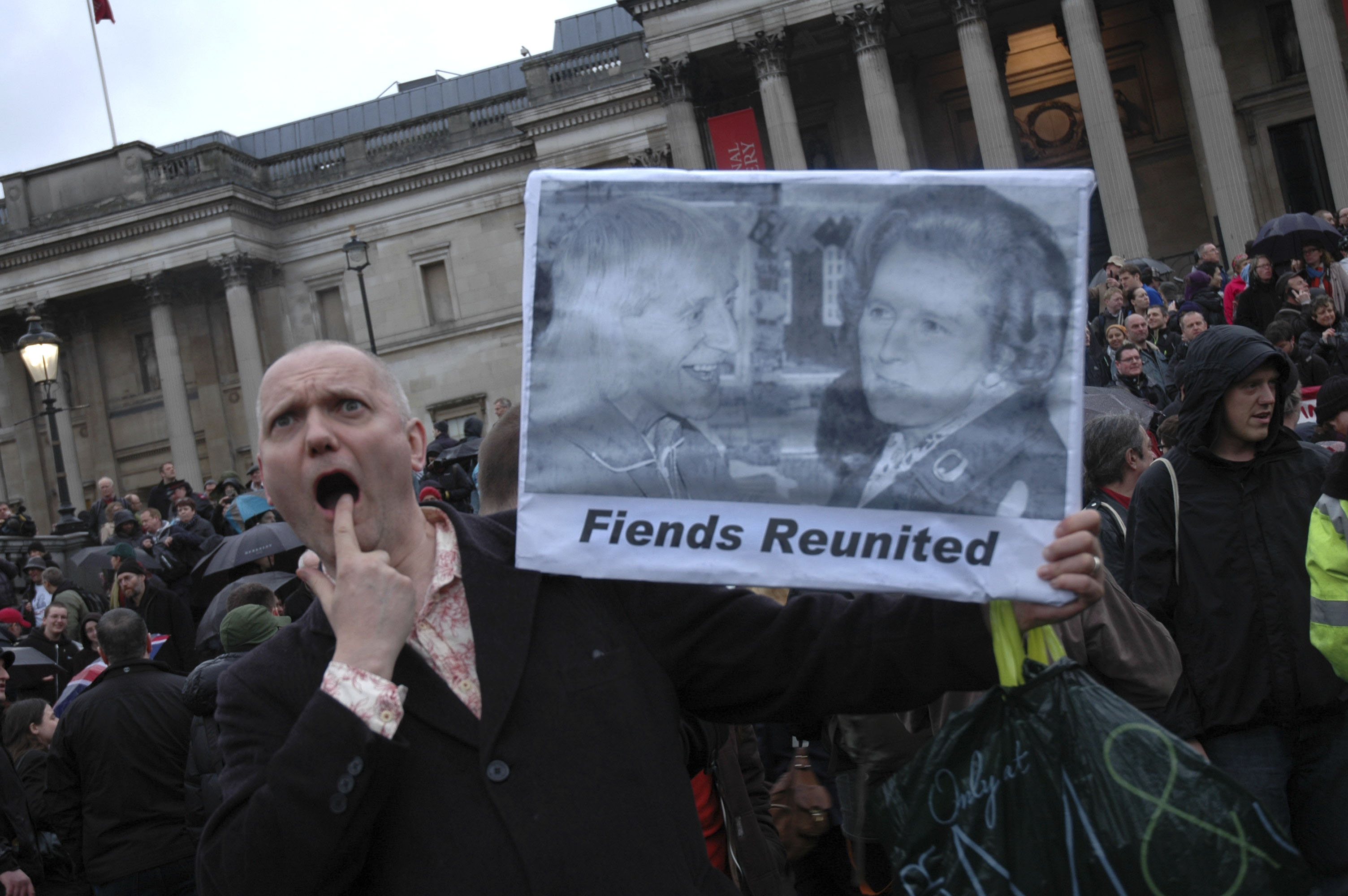
Protestor with an image of Thatcher and the sex offender Jimmy Savile, with the caption "Fiends Reunited"

As the funeral procession passed through Ludgate Circus in central London, hundreds of people turned their backs on Thatcher's coffin in protest, with protesters shouting "What a waste of money" and "Tory scum", along with people demonstrating against the cost of the funeral to taxpayers during a time of austerity.

Whether to fly the flag at half-mast for her funeral caused controversy for some councils where local feelings remained hostile. The government's national flag protocol dictates that union flags should be lowered to half-mast on the funeral days of all former prime ministers; however, most Scottish councils did not lower the flag for the funeral. Councils in England that refused to lower the flag included Barnsley, Sheffield and Wakefield in Yorkshire, as well as Coventry in the West Midlands.

While business leaders, including Alan Sugar, Richard Branson, Archie Norman and CBI chief John Cridland, credited her for creating a climate favourable to business in Britain, and lifting the UK "out of the economic relegation zone", the Premier League and the Football League rejected having a minute's silence around the country's football grounds, a move backed by the Football Supporters' Federation and the Hillsborough Family Support Group, the latter in reaction to her perceived lack of interest in uncovering abuse committed by the police during the Hillsborough disaster. However, Saracens and Exeter Chiefs held a minute's silence for her before their Premiership rugby union games.

=== International politics ===
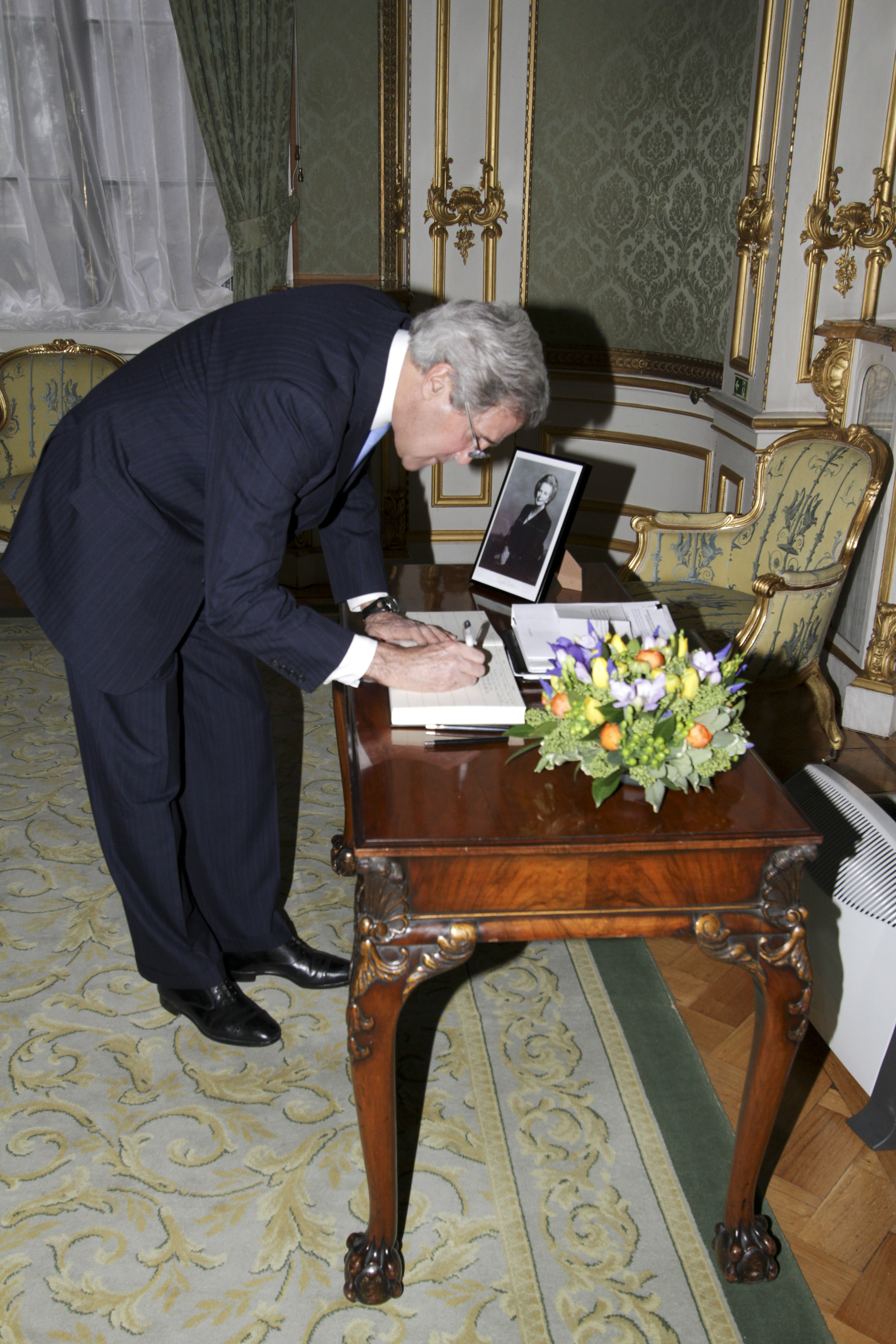
US secretary of state John Kerry signing the condolence book in London. He praised her in a statement as "a transformative leader who broke the glass ceiling in global politics".

Along with the eulogies and expressions of condolence, there were less than sympathetic reactions in Argentina, due to her role in the Falklands War, and in South Africa, given her support for constructive engagement with apartheid South Africa.

Ban Ki-moon, Secretary-General of the United Nations, described Thatcher as "a great model as the first woman Prime Minister of the United Kingdom, who not only demonstrated her leadership but has given such great hope for many women for equality, gender equality in Parliament". The message from Pope Francis "recalls with appreciation the Christian values which underpinned her commitment to public service and to the promotion of freedom among the family of nations".

Irish president Michael D. Higgins extended his condolences, saying: "She will be remembered as one of the most conviction-driven British prime ministers" and that "her key role in signing the Anglo-Irish Agreement will be recalled as a valuable early contribution to the search for peace and political stability". Taoiseach (Irish prime minister) Enda Kenny said he was "saddened" to learn of Thatcher's death, while Sinn Féin leader Gerry Adams criticised "the great hurt done to the Irish and British people during her time as British prime minister", adding: "Here in Ireland, her espousal of old draconian militaristic policies prolonged the war and caused great suffering".

French president François Hollande and German chancellor Angela Merkel remarked that Thatcher left "a deep impression on her country's history". Merkel went on to hail Thatcher's belief in the freedom of the individual as having contributed to "overcoming Europe's partition and the end of the Cold War".

Swedish prime minister Fredrik Reinfeldt said she was "an ideologue among pragmatists".

Spanish prime minister Mariano Rajoy hailed her as a 20th-century landmark and said it was a sad day for Europe.

Romanian president Traian Băsescu and the premier and foreign minister of Bulgaria, Marin Raykov, cited her influence on them and sent their condolences. They recognised Thatcher as a central figure in modern European history, and that her application of the law and economically liberal principles contributed to the downfall of communism in the Eastern Bloc. Polish foreign minister Radosław Sikorski said she was a "fearless champion of liberty".

Canadian prime minister Stephen Harper acknowledged Thatcher as having "define[d] the age in which she served [as well as] contemporary conservatism itself".

US president Barack Obama lamented the loss of "a true friend". His statement praised her as "an unapologetic supporter of our transatlantic alliance, she knew that with strength and resolve we could win the Cold War and extend freedom's promise".

Australian prime minister Julia Gillard admired Thatcher's achievements as a woman.

New Zealand prime minister John Key praised Thatcher's determination and expressed his "[sadness] for her family and Great Britain".

Israeli prime minister Benjamin Netanyahu lamented losing "a true friend of the Jewish people and Israel".

Japanese prime minister Shinzo Abe called her a great statesperson.

Filipino president Benigno Aquino III, through a statement, called her "a formidable world leader".

At the wishes of Thatcher's family, Argentine president Cristina Fernández de Kirchner was not invited to the funeral. Argentine foreign minister Héctor Timerman said that any invitation would have been "just another provocation". The Argentine ambassador, Alicia Castro, was invited in line with diplomatic protocol, but declined the invitation.

Indian prime minister Manmohan Singh, Pakistani president Asif Ali Zardari, and South African president Jacob Zuma expressed condolences, as did Russian president Vladimir Putin, who said that Thatcher was "a pragmatic, tough and consistent person". Former Soviet leader Mikhail Gorbachev expressed sadness at the loss of a "great" politician "whose words carried great weight".

=== Social media ===
Social media had grown in popularity significantly since the last death of a former British prime minister, Edward Heath, in 2005, and it played a significant role in the aftermath of her death, with celebrities channelling polarised views about Thatcher on Twitter, and endorsing campaigns and demonstrations. Anti-Thatcher sentiment prompted a campaign on social media networks to bring the song "Ding-Dong! The Witch Is Dead" from The Wizard of Oz into the UK Singles Chart, followed by a counter-campaign adopted by Thatcher supporters in favour of the 1979 tongue-in-cheek punk song "I'm in Love with Margaret Thatcher" by the Notsensibles, which had been started by the band's lead singer. On 12 April 2013, "Ding-Dong!" charted at number 2 across the UK (it made number 1 in Scotland), and "I'm in Love with Margaret Thatcher" at number 35. BBC Radio 1 controller Ben Cooper said that the station's chart show would not play the No. 2 song but that a portion of it would be aired as part of a news item. Cooper explained that its delicate compromise balanced freedom of speech and sensitivity for a family grieving for a loved one yet to be buried.

== See also ==
- Political polarisation

== Bibliography ==
- Aitken, Jonathan (2013). Margaret Thatcher: Power and Personality. A & C Black. ISBN 978-1-4088-3186-1.
- Campbell, John (2003). Margaret Thatcher: The Iron Lady. Vol. 2. Pimlico. ISBN 978-0-7126-6781-4.
- Haslam, S. Alexander; Reicher, Stephen D.; Platow, Michael J. (2020). The New Psychology of Leadership: Identity, Influence and Power. Routledge. ISBN 978-1-351-10822-5.
