= Bishop of Middleton =

Suffragan bishopric of the Church of England

The Bishop of Middleton is an episcopal title used by a suffragan bishop of the Church of England Diocese of Manchester, in the Province of York, England. The title takes its name after the town of Middleton in Greater Manchester; the See was erected under the Suffragans Nomination Act 1888 by Order in Council dated 10 August 1926. The suffragan has oversight of the archdeaconries of Manchester and Rochdale.

== List of bishops ==
Bishops of Middleton
From	Until	Incumbent	Notes
1927	1932	Richard Parsons	(1882–1948). Translated to Southwark, and later to Hereford
1932	1938	Cecil Wilson	(1875–1937)
1938	1943	Arthur Alston	(1872–1954)
1943	1952	Edward Mowll	(1881–1944)
1952	1958	Frank Woods	(1907–1992). Translated to Melbourne
1958	1959	Robert Nelson	(1913–1959)
1959	1982	Ted Wickham	(1911–1994)
1982	1992	Donald Tytler	(1925–1992) Died in office
2 February 1994	1999	Stephen Venner	(b. 1944). Translated to Dover
1999	2007	Michael Lewis	(b. 1953). Translated to Cyprus and the Gulf
2008	present	Mark Davies	(b. 1962)
