= Alan Cooper (bishop) =

The Right Revd Alan Cooper
- Assistant bishop in Karachi
- Church: Church of Pakistan
- Diocese: Diocese of Karachi
- In office: c. 1977–1980
- Other post: Provost of Bradford (1962–1977)

Orders
- Ordination: 1932
- Consecration: c. 1977

Personal details
- Born: 2 June 1909
- Died: 14 October 1999 (aged 90)
- Denomination: Anglican
- Occupation: Missionary
- Education: Christ's College, Cambridge

William Hugh Alan Cooper (2 June 1909 – 14 October 1999) was an eminent Anglican bishop whose ecclesiastical career spanned nearly 50 years in the twentieth century.

Educated at King's College School and Christ's College, Cambridge and ordained in 1932, he began his career with curacies at St Margaret, Blackheath and Holy Trinity, Cambridge. He was a CMS Missionary in Lagos and then held incumbencies at St Giles, Ashtead and of St Andrew, Plymouth before becoming Provost of Bradford, a post he held from 1962 to 1977. He was then an Assistant Bishop in Karachi for three years.

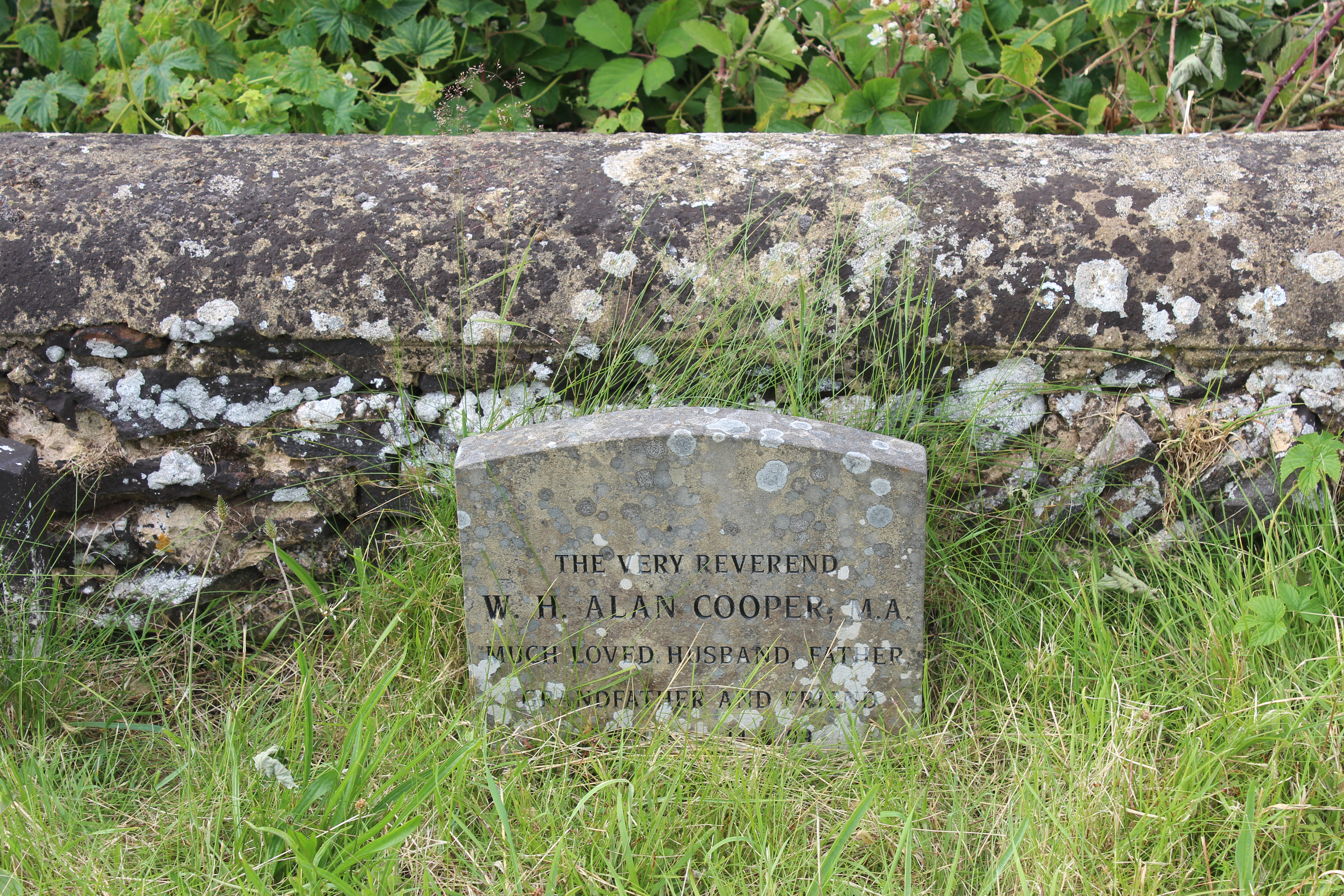
Grave in the churchyard of St Martha on the Hill near Guildford, Surrey
