= Bradford Cathedral =

Church in West Yorkshire, England

Coordinates: 53°47′44″N 1°44′51″W

- Cathedral Church of St Peter
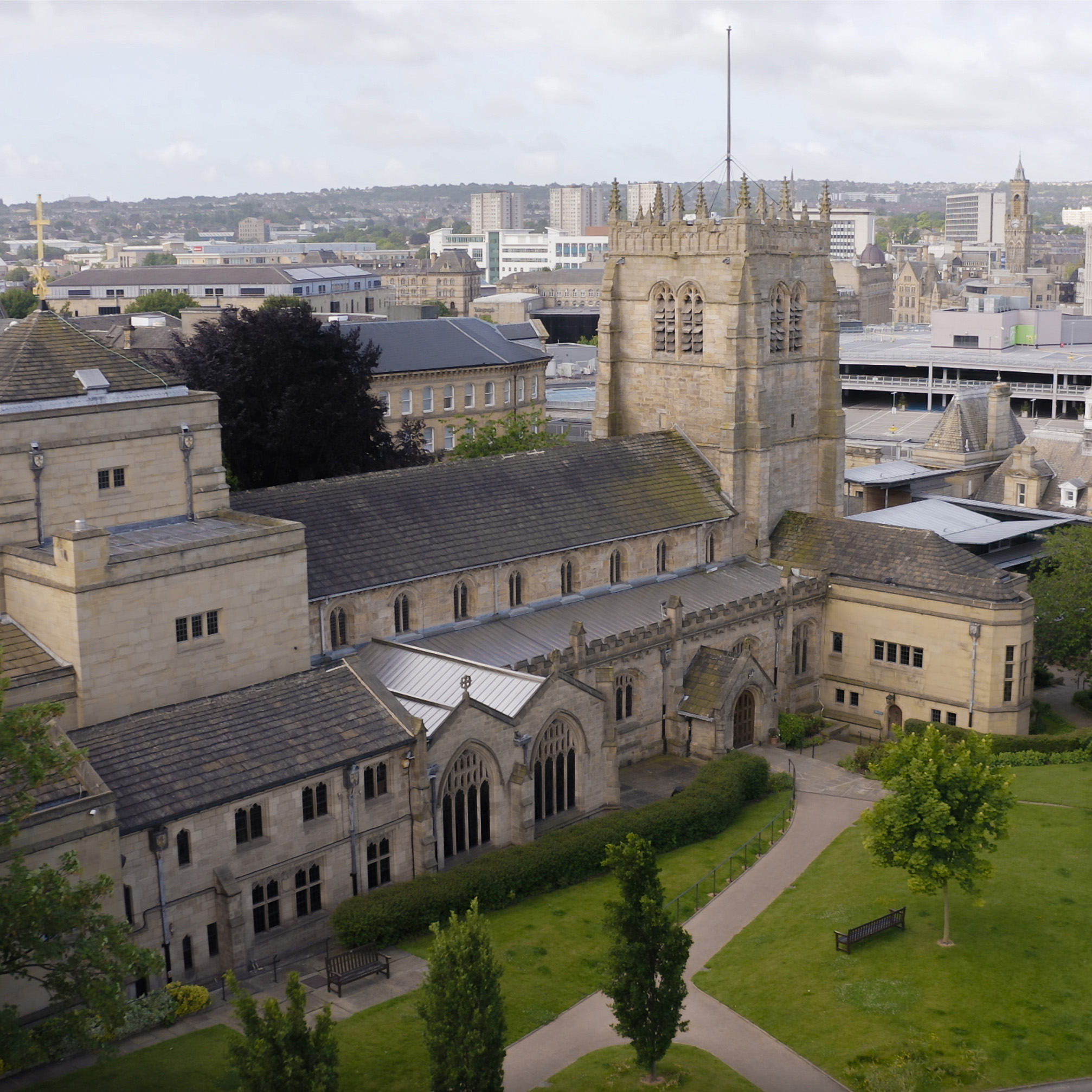
- Bradford Cathedral from the Cathedral Close

- Shown within West Yorkshire
- OS grid reference: SE 16715 33264
- Location: Bradford, West Yorkshire
- Country: England
- Denomination: Church of England
- Previous denomination: Roman Catholic
- Tradition: Broad church, Open evangelical
- Website: www.bradfordcathedral.org.uk

Architecture
- Style: Gothic
- Years built: c. 1400–1965

Administration
- Province: York
- Diocese: Leeds

Clergy
- Bishop: Nick Baines
- Dean: Andy Bowerman

Bradford Cathedral, or the Cathedral Church of St Peter, is an Anglican cathedral in Bradford, West Yorkshire, England, one of three co-equal cathedrals in the Diocese of Leeds alongside Ripon and Wakefield. Its site has been used for Christian worship since the 7th century, when missionaries based in Dewsbury evangelised the area. For many centuries it was the parish church of St Peter and achieved cathedral status in 1919. The cathedral is a Grade I listed building.

== Background ==
The first church on the site was believed to have been built in Anglo-Saxon times and fell into ruin after the Norman Conquest in 1066. A second church was built around 1200. The first mention of the parish of Bradford as distinct from being part of the parish of Dewsbury appears in the register of the Archbishop of York in 1281. Alice de Lacy, widow of Edmund de Lacy, one of the descendants of Ilbert de Lacy, gave a grant to the parish of Bradford that is recorded in the register of the Archbishop Wickwayne. Around 1327, Scottish raiders burnt down most of this stone church.

During the 14th century the church was rebuilt and some of the older masonry may have been used in the reconstruction of the nave. The construction of the third church was completed in 1458. The tower in the Perpendicular style was added to the west end and finished in 1508. A clerestory was added by the end of the 15th century. Proprietary chapels were founded, on the north side of the chancel by the Leventhorpe family, and on the south by the owners of Bolling Hall. In 1854 Robert Mawer carved a new reredos in Caen stone for the church. There is a photograph of it in the church archive. This reredos was lost during the 1950s rebuild by Edward Maufe.

Originally in the Diocese of York, the church was in the Diocese of Ripon before becoming a cathedral in 1919, when the Diocese of Bradford was created; it became one of three co-equal cathedrals of the new Diocese of Leeds upon its creation on 20 April 2014.

The building was extended in the 1950s and 1960s by Edward Maufe. The east end of the cathedral is Maufe's work, as well as the two west wings which contain the Song Room and Cathedral offices. In his east end extension he reused the Morris & Co. stained glass from the old east window. There is Victorian stained glass throughout the building including at the west end, where there is a window showing women of the Bible. The Arts and Crafts style stained glass in the First World War memorial window dedicated to the men of the West Yorkshire Regiment who were killed in action dates from 1921 and was designed by Archibald John Davies of the Bromsgrove Guild of Applied Arts. The many wall monuments include a sculpture by John Flaxman.

Stained-glass windows

East window

Saints Barnabas and Jude

Saints Cyprian and Alban

Saints James the Great and James the Less

Saints Stephen and Andrew

In 1987 the nave and west end were re-ordered to accommodate a growing number of visitors. The roof panelling was cleaned and restored, and new lighting was installed. To enable flexibility of use, the Victorian pews were replaced by chairs. The nave organ was removed to give more light and space at the west end, and a Bradford Computer Organ was installed, complementing the pipe organ in the choir with loudspeakers in the nave, though this is no longer in use.

At the beginning of the 21st century, the cathedral authorities decided to develop a museum of religion in St Peter's House (built in the 19th century as Bradford's main post office). The visitor numbers were much lower than expected, and the project collapsed, leaving the cathedral in debt, from which it was discharged in 2007. St Peter's House is now owned by a South Asian arts group, Kala Sangam.

The cathedral is set in a small conservation area which includes the close to its north. The close provides modern housing for the dean and canons residentiary, the bishop's official residence, Bishopcroft, being in Heaton, approximately 3 miles (4.8 km) from the city centre.

The cathedral and its predecessors were built on the shelf of alluvial land that had formed on the outside of the bend where Bradford Beck turns north, but the town grew up on the lower ground on the other side of the beck, so the church was always just outside the centre of town. In the 19th and 20th centuries the cathedral was partly hidden from the centre by buildings, first by the post office just below it, and subsequently by the 1960s developments of Forster Square and Petergate. The latter areas were demolished in 2006, leaving the cathedral more visible than for many years prior to the completion of the Broadway Centre in 2015.

Exterior of the cathedral

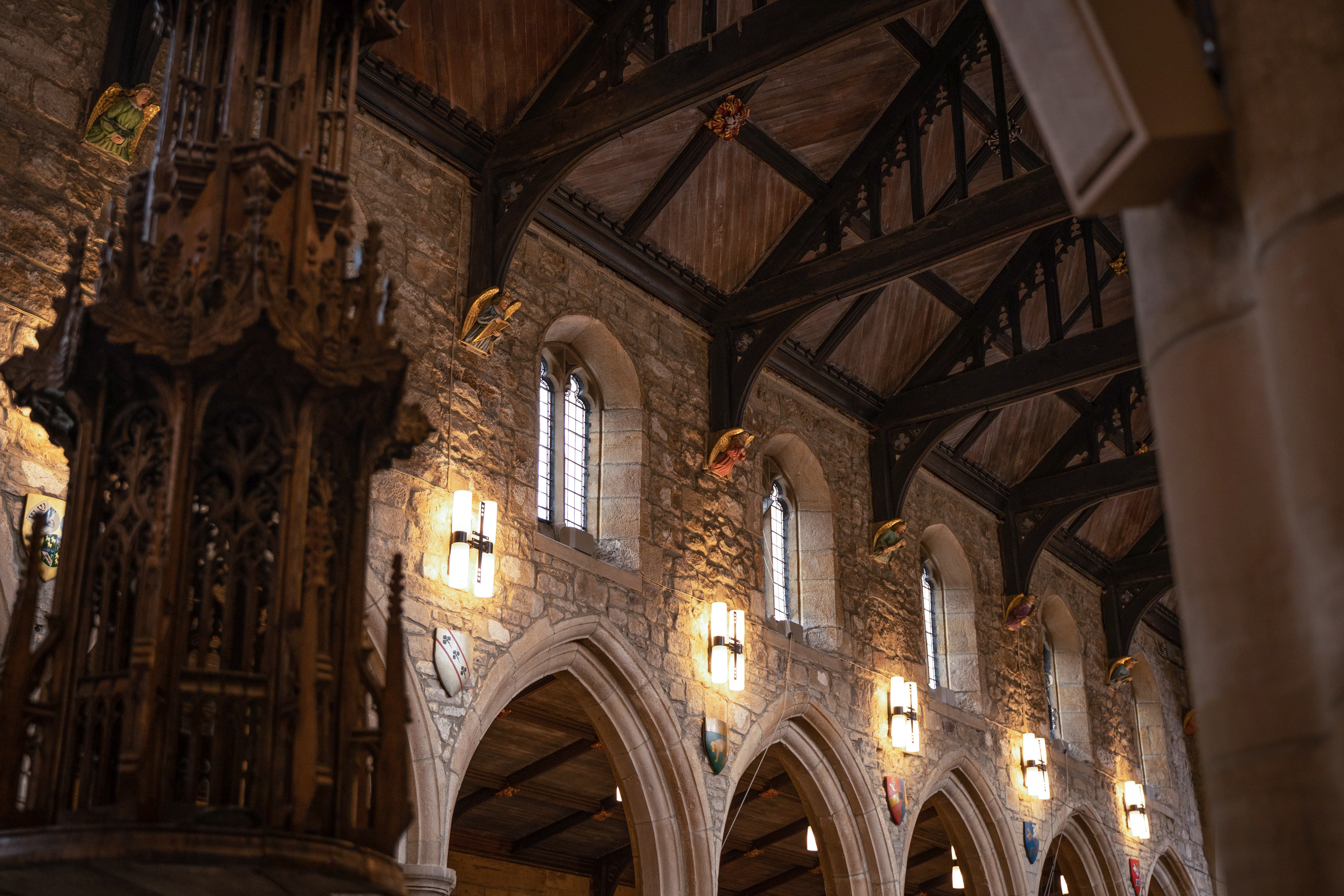
Pre-Reformation font cover at left, and the clerestory windows above

The nave inside the cathedral

== Dean and chapter ==
As of 21 May 2023:

- Dean – Andy Bowerman (since 19 June 2022)
- Canon for Intercultural Mission and the Arts – Ned Lunn (since 31 January 2023)

== Music ==
Bradford Cathedral has long been a place of music. During term-time, Choral Services are sung as follows: Sunday 10.30 am Choral Eucharist (rotates girls/adults, boys/adults or Cathedral Consort); Sunday 3:30 pm Choral Evensong (adults choir); Monday 5:30 pm Choral Evensong (girls choir); Tuesday 5:30 pm Choral Evensong (boys choir)

The boys and girls of the Choir sing as separate top lines and are drawn from as many as 20 local schools at any time. New entrants spend a couple of terms as a probationer, receiving basic training in singing and musicianship, before progressing to full membership. Full choristers have the opportunity to take up individual, free-of-charge tuition in singing, musicianship, theory or piano on a 1:1 basis each week. The lay clerks of the Choir are highly skilled volunteers, most of whom make their living outside of music. In September 2015 residential choral scholarships were introduced. The Cathedral Consort, a high standard chamber choir consisting of adult sopranos and lay clerks, completes the Choral Foundation.

In addition to the schedule above, the Choir also performs other concerts and services within and outside the diocese. Although foreign tours have been undertaken, the most recent being to Barcelona in 2010 and Bavaria in 2008, touring more recently has been within the UK, with the girls and boys each undertaking a residential tour annually, with or without the choir adults. Tours have been undertaken in recent years to Bristol, Worcester, Edinburgh and Durham.

The girls and men are involved with the annual Yorkshire Cathedrals' Girls' Choirs' Festival and hosted the Festal Evensong in March 2015. The boy choristers had not been involved with the Yorkshire Three Choirs Festival since 1981, but with the recent renaissance of an independent boys' top-line at the cathedral they, along with the lay clerks, were re-included in this annual festival from October 2015. Bradford Cathedral hosted the festival in October 2016.

In July 2012, the Choir recorded two services for the BBC Radio 2 Sunday Half Hour programme, which were broadcast in Autumn 2012, and the girls and men sang live for BBC Radio 4 Sunday Worship in December 2012. The Choir recorded a CD of Evening Canticles, including Humphrey Clucas's 'Bradford Service' in November 2013, and February 2014 saw the Choir recording two programmes of BBC Songs of Praise, airing on 2 March 2014 and Palm Sunday, 13 April 2014. Since 2015, the Choir has performed annually with the European Union Chamber Orchestra, singing Vivaldi's Gloria, Haydn's Little Organ Mass, and Schubert's Mass No. 2 in G major.

A specification of the William Hill pipe organ (1904), with later modifications by Hill, Norman & Beard (1961) and J. W. Walker (1977), can be found on the National Pipe Organ Register. A series of organ recitals takes place on many Wednesday lunchtimes throughout the year at 1.00 pm, attracting many well-known players. An Organ Appeal was launched in February 2013, aiming to raise £250,000 over several years, in order to secure the continued reliability of the instrument, as well as making possible several tonal adjustments. A. J. Carter of Wakefield and Andrew Cooper are working in conjunction to carry out this work on a phased basis over the coming years. The first phase, entailing the substantial upgrading of the console, was carried out in October 2014. The second phase, to clean, revoice and extend the Chancel (Positive) Division, was completed in the first half of 2018.

=== Organists and Directors of Music ===
- John Simpson c. 1820 – 1860
- Absalom Rawnsley Swaine c. 1861 – 1893
- Henry Coates 1893–1939
- Charles Hooper 1939–1963
- Keith Vernon Rhodes 1963–1981
- Geoffrey John Weaver 1982–1986
- Alan Graham Horsey 1986–2002
- Andrew Teague 2003–2011
- Alexander Woodrow 2012–2016
- Alexander Berry 2017–2023
- Graham Thorpe 2023-2025
- Geoffrey Woollatt 2025-

=== Sub Organists and Assistant Directors of Music ===
- Martin D. Baker 1982–2004 (Asst. Organist)
- Jonathan Kingston 1997–2000 (Sub Organist)
- Paul Bowen 2004–2011 — Paul Bowen held the office of Cathedral Organist from late 2011 to late 2014
- David Condry 2009–2012
- Jonathan Eyre 2012–2016
- Jon Payne 2016–2018
- Ed Jones 2018–2019
- Graham Thorpe 2019–2023
- Anthony Gray 2023-2024
- William Campbell 2025-

== Monuments of interest ==
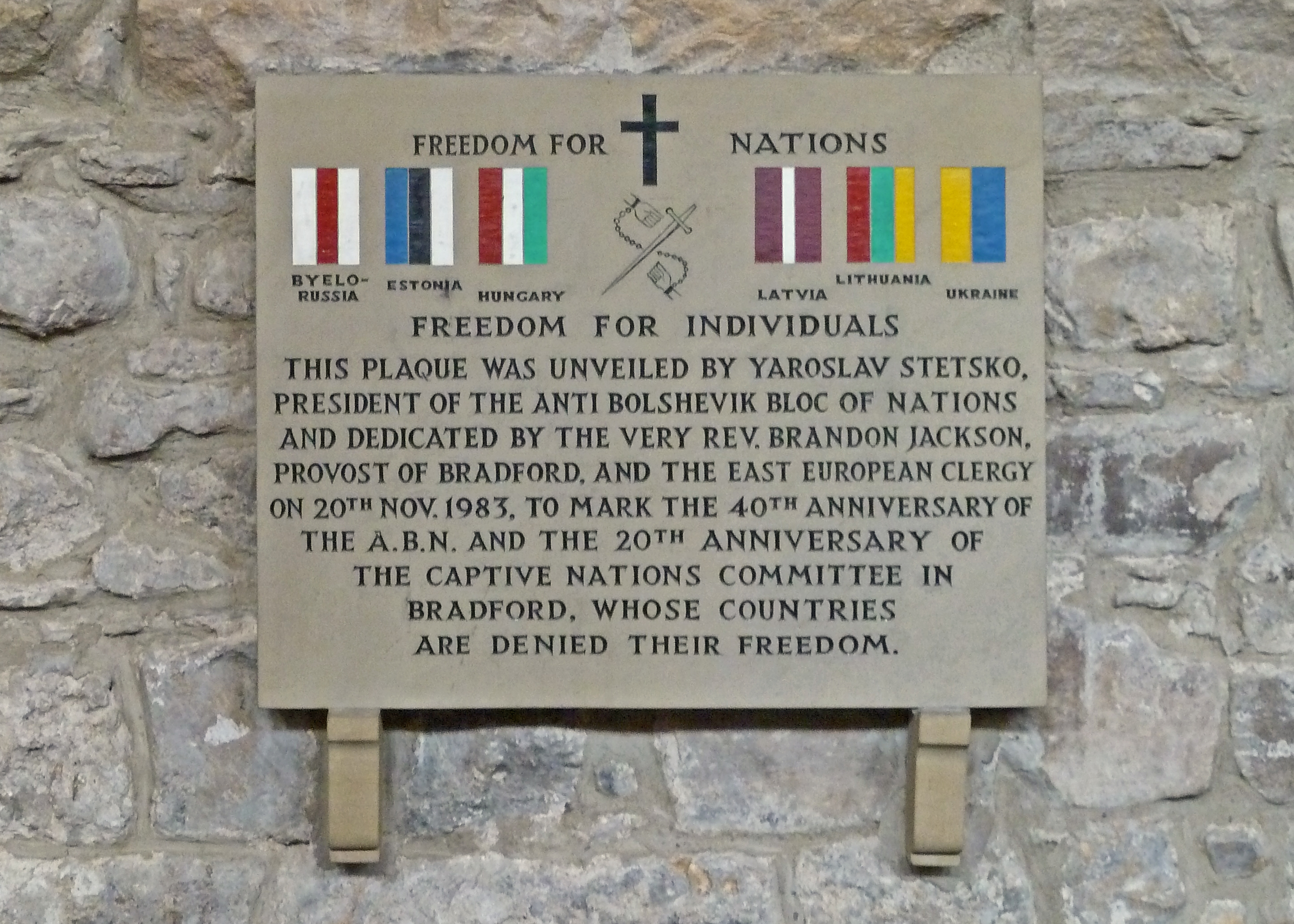
Plaque unveiled by Yaroslav Stetsko, president of the Anti-Bolshevik Bloc of Nations at Bradford Cathedral

- Memorial to Abraham Balme main promoter of the Bradford Canal, sculpted by John Flaxman RA.
- Monument to Abraham Sharp (d.1742) by Peter Scheemakers
- Monument to Robert Lowry Turner and George Whyte Watson
- The Bradford City Football Ground Fire Disaster Memorial
- The Battle of the Steeple / Market Charter plaque
- Memorial to Joseph Priestley

East side of the building

== See also ==
- Lists of cathedrals in the United Kingdom
- Grade I listed churches in West Yorkshire
- Listed buildings in Bradford (City Ward)
- List of musicians at English cathedrals

== Bibliography ==
- The Dioceses Commission's Yorkshire Review — A Guide to the Report
