= Bibliography of Margaret Thatcher =

This bibliography includes major books and articles about British prime minister Margaret Thatcher and her policies in office.

== Thatcher biographies ==
- Aitken, Jonathan (2013). Margaret Thatcher: Power and Personality. New York: Bloomsbury. ISBN 978-1-62040-342-6.
- Berlinski, Claire (2008). There Is No Alternative: Why Margaret Thatcher Matters. Basic Books. ISBN 978-0-465-00231-3.
- Campbell, John (2000). Margaret Thatcher: The Grocer's Daughter. Vol. 1. Pimlico. ISBN 978-0-7126-7418-8.
- ——— (2003). Margaret Thatcher: The Iron Lady. Vol. 2. Pimlico. ISBN 978-0-7126-6781-4.
- ——— (2011). David Freeman (ed.). The Iron Lady: Margaret Thatcher, from Grocer's Daughter to Prime Minister. Penguin Books. ISBN 978-1-101-55866-9.
- Cannadine, David (2017). "Thatcher [née Roberts], Margaret Hilda, Baroness Thatcher (1925–2013), prime minister". Oxford Dictionary of National Biography (online ed.). Oxford University Press. doi:10.1093/ref:odnb/106415. (Subscription, Wikipedia Library access or UK public library membership required.)
- ——— (2017). Margaret Thatcher: A Life and Legacy. Oxford University Press. ISBN 978-0-19-879500-1.
- Harris, Robin (2013). Not for Turning: The Life of Margaret Thatcher. Transworld. ISBN 978-1-4481-2738-2.
- Just, Peter (2025). Margaret Thatcher: Life After Downing Street. Hull, UK: Biteback Publishing. ISBN 978-1-7859-0920-7. OCLC 1512889058.
- Moore, Charles (2013). Margaret Thatcher: From Grantham to the Falklands. Vol. 1. Knopf Publishing Group. ISBN 978-0-307-95894-5.
- ——— (2015). Margaret Thatcher: Everything She Wants. Vol. 2. Penguin Books. ISBN 978-0-241-20126-8.
- ——— (2016). Margaret Thatcher: At Her Zenith: In London, Washington and Moscow. Vol. 2. Vintage Books. ISBN 978-1-101-87384-7.
- ——— (2019). Margaret Thatcher: Herself Alone. Vol. 3. Penguin Books. ISBN 978-0-241-32475-2.
- Young, Hugo (2013). One of Us. Macmillan. ISBN 978-1-4472-5196-5.

== Politics ==
- Bale, Tim, ed. (2015). Margaret Thatcher. Critical evaluations of key political leaders. Vol. 4. Routledge. ISBN 978-1-138-79690-4.
- Butler, David and Dennis Kavanagh (1980). The British General Election of 1979. Palgrave Macmillan. ISBN 978-1-349-04755-0.
- ——— (1985). The British General Election of 1983. Palgrave Macmillan. ISBN 978-0-333-34578-8.
- ——— (1988). The British General Election of 1987. Palgrave Macmillan. ISBN 978-1-349-19143-7.
- Butler, David; Tony Travers; and Andrew Adonis (1994). Failure in British Government: the Politics of the Poll Tax. Oxford University Press. ISBN 978-0-19-827876-4.
- Crines, Andrew S.; Timothy Heppell; and Peter Dorey (2016). The Political Rhetoric and Oratory of Margaret Thatcher. Springer. ISBN 978-1-137-45384-6.
- Evans, Eric J. (2008). Thatcher and Thatcherism. Routledge. ISBN 978-1-134-77669-6.
- Filby, Eliza (2015). God and Mrs Thatcher: The Battle For Britain's Soul. Biteback. ISBN 978-1-84954-888-5.
- Halcrow, Morrison (1989). Keith Joseph: A Single Mind. Macmillan London. ISBN 978-0-333-49016-7.
- Jenkins, Peter (1988). Mrs. Thatcher's Revolution: Ending of the Socialist Era. Cambridge, US: Harvard University Press. ISBN 978-0-674-58833-2. OL 2031622M.
- Jenkins, Simon (2006). Thatcher and Sons: A Revolution in Three Acts. Penguin Books. ISBN 978-0-14-191109-0.
- Jones, Bill, ed. (1999). Political Issues in Britain Today. Manchester University Press. ISBN 978-0-7190-5432-7.
- Letwin, Shirley Robin (1993). The Anatomy of Thatcherism. Transaction. ISBN 978-1-4128-4822-0.
- Pugliese, Stanislao G. and Iain Dale, eds. (2003). The Political Legacy of Margaret Thatcher. Politico's. ISBN 978-1-84275-025-4.
- Riddell, Peter (1989). The Thatcher Decade: How Britain Has Changed During the 1980s. Blackwell. ISBN 978-0-631-16274-2.
- Shell, Donald R. (1985). "The British Constitution in 1984". Parliamentary Affairs. 38 (2): 131–149.
- ——— (1985). "The House of Lords and the Thatcher government". Parliamentary Affairs. 38 (1): 16–32.
- Young, Hugo and Anne Sloman (1986). The Thatcher Phenomenon. London: British Broadcasting Corporation. ISBN 978-0-563-20473-2.

== Economics and unions ==
- Backhouse, Roger E. (2002). "The Macroeconomics of Margaret Thatcher". Journal of the History of Economic Thought. 24 (3): 313–334. doi:10.1080/104277102200004767. S2CID 154788348.
- Dorey, Peter (2016). "Weakening the Trade Unions, One Step at a Time: The Thatcher Governments' Strategy for the Reform of Trade-Union Law, 1979–1984". Historical Studies in Industrial Relations. 37: 169–200. doi:10.3828/hsir.2016.37.6.
- Farrall, Stephen and Colin Hay, eds. (2014). The Legacy of Thatcherism: Assessing and Exploring Thatcherite Social and Economic Policies. Oxford University Press. ISBN 978-0-19-726570-3.
- Fry, Geoffrey K. (1985). "Government and Public Administration in 1984". Parliamentary Affairs. 38 (3): 282–295.
- Hanson, Charles (2016). Taming the Trade Unions: A Guide to the Thatcher Government's Employment Reforms, 1980–90. Springer. ISBN 978-1-349-21319-1.
- Howell, David; et al. (1987). "Goodbye to all that?: A Review of Literature on the 1984/5 Miners' Strike". Work, Employment & Society. 1 (3): 388–404. doi:10.1177/0950017087001003007. JSTOR 23745863. S2CID 154609889.
- Gibbon, Peter (1988). "Analysing the British miners' strike of 1984–5". Economy and Society. 17 (2): 139–194. doi:10.1080/03085148800000008.
- Marsh, David (1991). "Privatization under Mrs. Thatcher: a review of the literature". Public Administration. 69 (4): 459–480. doi:10.1111/j.1467-9299.1991.tb00915.x.
- ——— (1991). "British industrial relations policy transformed: the Thatcher legacy". Journal of Public Policy. 11 (3): 291–313. doi:10.1017/S0143814X00005341.
- ——— (1992). The New Politics of British Trade Unionism: Union Power and the Thatcher Legacy. Macmillan International Higher Education. ISBN 978-1-349-21921-6.
- ——— and Heather Savigny (2005). "Changes in trade union–government relations 1974–2002". Politics. 25 (3): 165–174. doi:10.1111/j.1467-9256.2005.00241.x. hdl:2086/15638. S2CID 144405462.
- Miller, Kenneth and Mairi Steele (1993). "Employment legislation: Thatcher and after". Industrial Relations Journal. 24 (3): 224–235. doi:10.1111/j.1468-2338.1993.tb00675.x.
- Norpoth, Helmut (1992). Confidence Regained: Economics, Mrs. Thatcher, and the British Voter. University of Michigan Press. ISBN 0-472-10333-4.
- Towers, Brian (1989). "Running the Gauntlet: British Trade Unions under Thatcher, 1979–1988". Industrial and Labor Relations Review. 42 (2): 163–188. doi:10.2307/2523352. JSTOR 2523352.
- Ward, Jacob (2020). "Computer Models and Thatcherist Futures: From Monopolies to Markets in British Telecommunications". Technology and Culture. 61 (3): 843–870. doi:10.1353/tech.2020.0076. PMID 33416793. S2CID 221468764.
- Williamson, Adrian (2016). Conservative Economic Policymaking and the Birth of Thatcherism, 1964–1979. Palgrave Macmillan UK. ISBN 978-1-137-46026-4.
- Wilsher, Peter; Donald Macintyre; and Michael Jones, eds. (1985). Strike: Thatcher, Scargill and the Miners. Coronet Booksess. ISBN 978-0-233-97825-3.

== Social policy ==
- Ambler, John S. (1987). "Constraints on Policy Innovation in Education: Thatcher's Britain and Mitterrand's France". Comparative Politics. 20 (1): 85–105. doi:10.2307/421922. JSTOR 421922.
- Bull, David and Paul Wilding, eds. (1983). Thatcherism and the Poor. Child Poverty Action Group. ISBN 978-0-903963-57-2.
- Dixon, David (1983). "Thatcher's People: The British Nationality Act 1981". Journal of Law and Society. 10 (2): 161–180. doi:10.2307/1410230. JSTOR 1410230.
- Douglas, Gillian (1990). "Family law under the Thatcher government". Journal of Law and Society. 17 (17): 411–426. doi:10.2307/1409899. JSTOR 1409899.
- Evans, Stephen (2014). "Touching from a Distance: The Younger Generation of One Nation Conservatives and Thatcherism". Parliamentary History. 33 (2): 321–341. doi:10.1111/1750-0206.12102.
- Farrall, Stephen and Colin Hay, eds. (2014). The Legacy of Thatcherism: Assessing and Exploring Thatcherite Social and Economic Policies. OUP/British Academy. ISBN 978-0-19-726570-3.
- Klein, Rudolf (1985). "Why Britain's conservatives support a socialist health care system". Health Affairs. 4 (1): 41–58. doi:10.1377/hlthaff.4.1.41. PMID 3997046.
- Peck, Jamie and Adam Tickell (2007). "Conceptualizing Neoliberalism, Thinking Thatcherism" (PDF). In Helga Leitner; Jamie Peck; and Eric S. Sheppard (eds.). Contesting Neoliberalism: Urban Frontiers. Guilford Press. pp. 26–50. ISBN 978-1-59385-320-4.
- Rhodes, Martin (2000). "Desperately seeking a solution: social democracy, Thatcherism and the 'third way' in British welfare". West European Politics. 23 (2): 161–186. doi:10.1080/01402380008425371. S2CID 153504559.
- Scott-Samuel, Alex; et al. (2014). "The impact of Thatcherism on health and well-being in Britain" (PDF). International Journal of Health Services. 44 (1): 53–71. doi:10.2190/HS.44.1.d. PMID 24684084. S2CID 33485592.
- Sutcliffe-Braithwaite, Florence (2012). "Neo-Liberalism and Morality in the Making of Thatcherite Social Policy" (PDF). The Historical Journal. 55 (2): 497–520. doi:10.1017/S0018246X12000118. JSTOR 23263347. S2CID 144487600. Archived from the original (PDF) on 2020-11-30.
- Vinen, Richard (2009). Thatcher's Britain: The Politics and Social Upheaval of the 1980s. London: Simon & Schuster. ISBN 978-1-84737-175-1.
- Whitty, Geoff and Ian Menter (1988). "Lessons of Thatcherism: education policy in England and Wales 1979–88". Journal of Law and Society. 16 (1): 42–64. doi:10.2307/1409976. JSTOR 1409976.

== Foreign policy ==
- Aldous, Richard (2012). Reagan and Thatcher: The Difficult Relationship. W. W. Norton & Company. ISBN 978-0-393-08315-6.
- Aughey, Arthur and Cathy Gormley-Heenan (2011). "The Anglo-Irish Agreement: 25 Years On". Political Quarterly. 82 (3): 389–397. doi:10.1111/j.1467-923X.2011.02202.x.
- ——— (2011). The Anglo-Irish Agreement: Re-thinking its Legacy. Manchester University Press. ISBN 978-0-7190-8498-0.
- Bennett, Harry (2004). "Lord Carrington: Foreign Secretary, 1979–82". In Kevin Theakston (ed.). British Foreign Secretaries Since 1974. Psychology Press. pp. 131–154. ISBN 978-0-7146-5656-4.
- Bermant, Azriel (2016). Margaret Thatcher and the Middle East. Cambridge University Press. ISBN 978-1-107-15194-9.
- Brown, Archie (2008). "The Change to Engagement in Britain's Cold War Policy: The Origins of the Thatcher-Gorbachev Relationship". Journal of Cold War Studies. 10 (3): 3–47. doi:10.1162/jcws.2008.10.3.3. S2CID 57561387.
- ——— (2020). The Human Factor: Gorbachev, Reagan, and Thatcher, and the End of the Cold War. OUP Oxford. ISBN 978-0-19-106561-3.
- ——— (2020). "Political leadership in the Cold War's ending: Thatcher and the turn to engagement with the Soviet Union". British Politics and Policy at LSE. Archived from the original on 16 Jun 2020.
- Bruni, Domenico Maria (2018). "A leader at war: Margaret Thatcher and the Falklands crisis of 1982". Observatoire de la société britannique. 20 (20): 135–157. doi:10.4000/osb.2007. hdl:11365/1222461.
- Byrd, Peter, ed. (1988). British Foreign Policy under Thatcher. St. Martin's Press. ISBN 978-0-86003-401-8.
- Carroll, Rory (2023). Killing Thatcher: The IRA, the Manhunt and the Long War on the Crown. London: HarperCollins. ISBN 978-0-00-847667-0. Published in the United States under the title There Will Be Fire: Margaret Thatcher, the IRA, and Two Minutes That Changed History.
- Cooper, James (2016). "From Reykjavik to Fulton: Reagan, Thatcher, and the ending of the Cold War" (PDF). Journal of Transatlantic Studies. 14 (4): 383–400. doi:10.1080/14794012.2016.1230259. S2CID 152137073.
- Donaghy, Aaron (2017). "Margaret Thatcher's Private Secretaries for Foreign Affairs, 1979–1984". In Andrew Holt and Warren Dockter (eds.). Private Secretaries to the Prime Minister: Foreign Affairs from Churchill to Thatcher. Taylor & Francis. pp. 166–186. ISBN 978-1-317-07563-9.
- Gibran, Daniel K. (2008). The Falklands War: Britain Versus the Past in the South Atlantic. McFarland & Company. ISBN 978-0-7864-9009-7.
- Grachev, Andrei (2010). "Political and Personal: Gorbachev, Thatcher and the End of the Cold War". JEIH Journal of European Integration History. 16 (1): 45–57. doi:10.5771/0947-9511-2010-1-45.
- Ionescu, Ghiță (1991). Leadership in an Interdependent World: The Statesmanship of Adenauer, De Gaulle, Thatcher, Reagan & Gorbachev. Westview Press. ISBN 978-0-8133-1399-3.
- Kelly, Stephen (2020). "'The Anglo-Irish Agreement put us on side with the Americans': Margaret Thatcher, Anglo-American relations and the path to the Anglo-Irish Agreement, 1979–1985". Contemporary British History. 34 (3): 433–457. doi:10.1080/13619462.2020.1769607. S2CID 219739740.
- Novak, Andrew (2009). "Face-saving maneuvers and strong third-party mediation: the Lancaster house conference on Zimbabwe-Rhodesia". International Negotiation. 14 (1): 149–174. doi:10.1163/157180609X406553.
- Renwick, Robin (2013). A Journey with Margaret Thatcher: Foreign Policy Under the Iron Lady. Biteback. ISBN 978-1-84954-575-4.
- Shannon, William V. (1986). "The Anglo-Irish Agreement". Foreign Affairs. 64 (4): 849–870. doi:10.2307/20042691. JSTOR 20042691.
- Sharp, Paul (2016). Thatcher's Diplomacy: The Revival of British Foreign Policy. Palgrave Macmillan. ISBN 978-0-333-98368-3.
- ——— (1991). "Thatcher's Wholly British Foreign Policy". Orbis. 35 (3): 395–410.
- Stacey, Emily (2014). "From hectoring, dogmatic woman to a special relationship: Margaret Thatcher and Jimmy Carter, 1977–1979". White House Studies. 14 (2).
- Stoddart, Kristan (2014). Facing Down the Soviet Union: Britain, the USA, NATO and Nuclear Weapons, 1976–1983. Palgrave Macmillan UK. ISBN 978-1-137-44033-4.
- Turner, Michael J. (2010). Britain's International Role, 1970–1991. Palgrave Macmillan. ISBN 978-0-230-36728-9.
- Wapshott, Nicholas (2007). Ronald Reagan and Margaret Thatcher: A Political Marriage. Sentinel. ISBN 978-1-59523-047-8.

== Historiography ==
- Bevir, Mark and Rod A. W. Rhodes (1998). "Narratives of 'Thatcherism'". West European Politics. 21 (1): 97–119. doi:10.1080/01402389808425234.
- Campbell, Beatrix (2015). "Margaret Thatcher: To be or not to be a woman". British Politics. 10 (1): 41–51. doi:10.1057/bp.2014.27. S2CID 143944033.
- Garnett, Mark (2007). "Banality in Politics: Margaret Thatcher and the Biographers". Political Studies Review. 5 (2): 172–182. doi:10.1111/j.1478-9299.2007.00127.x. S2CID 145538768.
- Harrison, Brian (1994). "Mrs. Thatcher and the Intellectuals". Twentieth Century British History. 5 (2): 206–245. doi:10.1093/tcbh/5.2.206.
- ——— (2014). "Margaret Thatcher's Impact on Historical Writing". In Wm. Roger Louis (ed.). Irrepressible Adventures with Britannia: Personalities, Politics, and Culture in Britain. I.B. Tauris. ISBN 978-1-78076-798-7.
- Jackson, Ben and Robert Saunders, eds. (2012). Making Thatcher's Britain. Cambridge University Press. ISBN 978-1-107-01238-7.
- Kelly, Stephen (2021). Margaret Thatcher, the Conservative Party and the Northern Ireland Conflict, 1975–1990. Bloomsbury. ISBN 978-1-350-11538-5.
- Kowol, Kit (2016). "Renaissance on the Right? New Directions in the History of the Post-War Conservative Party". Twentieth Century British History. 27 (2): 290–304. doi:10.1093/tcbh/hww012.
- Kwarteng, Kwasi (2015). Thatcher's Trial: Six Months That Defined a Leader. Bloomsbury. ISBN 978-1-4088-5919-3.
- Marquand, David (1987). "The literature on Thatcher". Contemporary British History. 1 (3): 30–31. doi:10.1080/13619468708580911.
- Panton, Kenneth J. and Keith A. Cowlard, eds. (2008). Historical Dictionary of the Contemporary United Kingdom. Scarecrow Press. p. 640. ISBN 978-0-8108-5091-0.
- Pilcher, Jane (1995). "The gender significance of women in power: British women talking about Margaret Thatcher". European Journal of Women's Studies. 2 (4): 493–508. doi:10.1177/135050689500200405. S2CID 144965800.
- Porter, Bernard (1994). "'Though Not an Historian Myself ...' Margaret Thatcher and the Historians". Twentieth Century British History. 5 (2): 246–256. doi:10.1093/tcbh/5.2.246.
- Roy, Subroto and John Clarke, eds. (2006). Margaret Thatcher's Revolution: How it Happened and What it Meant. A & C Black. ISBN 978-0-8264-8279-2.
- Saunders, Robert (2017). "The Many Lives of Margaret Thatcher". English Historical Review. 132 (556): 638–658. doi:10.1093/ehr/cex137.
- Stewart, Graham (2013). Bang!: A History of Britain in the 1980s. Atlantic Books. ISBN 978-1-78239-137-1.
- Turner, John (1999). "The British Conservative Party in the Twentieth Century: from Beginning to End?". Contemporary European History. 8 (2): 275–287. doi:10.1017/s0960777399002052.
- Vinen, Richard (2013). Thatcher's Britain: The Politics and Social Upheaval of the Thatcher Era. Simon & Schuster. ISBN 978-1-4711-2828-8.

== Primary sources ==
- Dale, Iain, ed. (2013). Memories of Margaret Thatcher: A Portrait, By Those Who Knew Her Best. Biteback. ISBN 978-1-84954-612-6.
- Heseltine, Michael (2001). Life in the Jungle: My Autobiography. Coronet Books. ISBN 978-0-340-73916-7.
- Howe, Geoffrey (1994). Conflict of Loyalty. Macmillan. ISBN 978-0-333-59283-0.
- Hurd, Douglas (2003). Memoirs. Abacus. ISBN 978-0-349-11828-4.
- Lamont, Norman (1999). In Office. Little, Brown. ISBN 978-0-316-64707-6.
- Lawson, Nigel (1992). The View from No. 11: Memoirs of a Tory Radical. Bantam Press. ISBN 978-0-593-02218-4.
- ——— (2011). Memoirs of a Tory Radical (abridged ed.). Biteback. ISBN 978-1-84954-279-1.
- Major, John (2013). John Major: The Autobiography. HarperCollins. ISBN 978-0-00-740046-1.
- Parkinson, Cecil (1992). Right at the Centre. Weidenfeld & Nicolson. ISBN 978-0-297-81262-3.
- Ridley, Nicholas (1991). 'My Style of Government': The Thatcher Years. London, UK: Hutchinson. ISBN 978-0-09-175051-0.
- Tebbit, Norman (1988). Upwardly Mobile. Weidenfeld & Nicolson. ISBN 978-0-297-79427-1.
- Thatcher, Margaret (1993). The Downing Street Years. HarperCollins. ISBN 978-0-00-255354-4.
- ——— (1995). The Path to Power. HarperCollins. ISBN 978-0-00-638753-4.
- ——— (1997). Robin Harris (ed.). The Collected Speeches of Margaret Thatcher. HarperCollins. ISBN 978-0-06-018734-7.
- ——— (2003). Statecraft: Strategies for a Changing World. Harper Perennial. ISBN 978-0-06-095912-8.
- ——— (2013). Robin Harris (ed.). Margaret Thatcher: The Autobiography. HarperCollins. ISBN 978-0-00-741694-3.
- Urban, George (1996). Diplomacy and Disillusion at the Court of Margaret Thatcher: An Insider's View. Bloomsbury Academic. ISBN 978-1-86064-084-1.
