= Henry William Adams =

UK soldier in the First Opium War

Major-General Henry William Adams
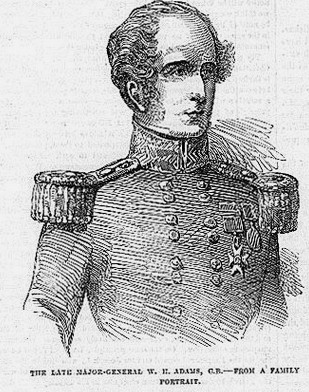
- The Late Major-General William Henry Adams C.B. Taken from the Illustrated London News March 10, 1855
- Born: 31 January 1805; Ansty Hall
- Died: 17 December 1854 (aged 49); Scutari
- Cause of death: Died of wounds received at the Battle of Inkerman
- Military career
- Allegiance: United Kingdom
- Branch: British Army
- Rank: Major-General
- Conflicts: First Opium War; Crimean War
- Awards: CB

Major-General Henry William Adams CB (1805–1854) was a soldier who served in the First Opium War and died of wounds sustained during the Crimean War. He commanded the 18th (Royal Irish) Regiment of Foot) during the former conflict and fought with the 2nd Infantry Division during the Crimean War, receiving wounds that would prove fatal at the Battle of Inkerman.

== Early life and military service ==
The eldest son of nine children of Henry Cadwallader Adams (1779-1842) and his wife Emma (1796-1857), the eldest daughter of Sir William Curtis of Ansty Hall, Warwickshire, Adams joined the Army at the age of 18 on 31 July 1823 when he was commissioned as Ensign in the 12th Regiment of Foot. He was promoted via purchase to Lieutenant on 31 December 1825, and subsequently to Captain on 10 June 1826 by purchase. Adams then purchased promotion to Major on 18 January 1839.

== First Opium War ==
After 17 years service, Adams purchased the rank of Lieutenant Colonel in the 18th Royal Irish Regiment of Foot, commanding the corps during the First Opium War and seeing action at the First Capture of Chusan in July 1840, Battle of Canton in May 1841, Battle of Amoy in August 1841, Second Capture of Chusan in October 1841, Battle of Ningpo in March 1842 and Battle of Chinkiang in July 1842. Having been appointed as a Commander of the Order of the Bath on 14 October 1841, at the end of the action, he would transfer as Lieutenant Colonel to the 49th Foot, returning with the regiment to England where he would marry his cousin, Catherine Adams, daughter of the Reverend Thomas Coker Adams, who had been vicar of St James' Church, Ansty for 43 years. Adams was then promoted to Colonel on 11 November 1851, and appointed as a Deputy Lieutenant of Warwickshire on 3 September 1852.

== Crimean War service ==
Adams was appointed brigadier-general on 21 February 1854 and given command of the 2nd Brigade of the 2nd Division, where he served during the Battle of Alma, receiving the thanks of Lord Raglan in his despatch to the Duke of Newcastle.

== Death ==
Adams was mentioned in despatches and severely wounded at the subsequent Battle of Inkerman, after having his horse killed under him. Despite rescue by Serjent George Walters, who won the Victoria Cross for his actions, Adams died as a result of his injuries at Scutari a week later having been promoted to Major-General on 12 December 1854. He was attended to by his wife, who had travelled from England, on his death bed, and his body repatriated to England, where he was buried in the Adams family vault in St James' churchyard, Ansty

== Memorials ==
A tower, designed by Sir George Gilbert Scott was erected in Adams' memory in 1856 at St James' Church, Ansty, Warwickshire. A memorial plaque was also installed at the Royal Garrison Church, Portsmouth
