= Everything She Wants (disambiguation) =

"Everything She Wants" is a song by the British pop duo Wham!

Everything She Wants may also refer to:

- "Everything She Wants" (D:TNG episode), an episode of the television show Degrassi: The Next Generation
- "Everything She Wants" (Being Erica episode), an episode of the television show Being Erica
- Margaret Thatcher: Everything She Wants, the second volume of the authorized biography by Charles Moore

== See also ==
- All That She Wants
