= The Path to Power =

The Path to Power may refer to:

- Dragon Ball: The Path to Power, a 1996 animated film
- The Path to Power (Thatcher book), a memoir by Margaret Thatcher
- The Path to Power (1982), the first volume of Robert Caro's biography of Lyndon Johnson
