= Murray Marshall =

England international rugby union player

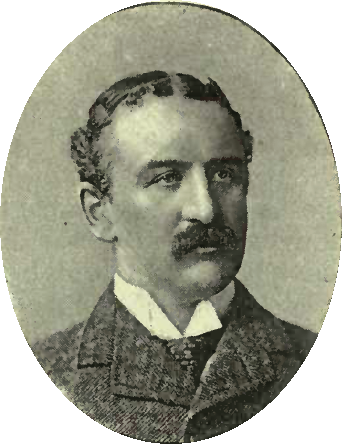
- Born: Murray Wyatt Marshall; 7 October 1852 Guildford, Surrey, England, UK
- Died: 28 July 1930 (aged 77) Godalming, Surrey, England, UK
- School: Wellington College, Berkshire

Rugby union career
- Position: Forward
Senior career
Years	Team	Apps	(Points)
- Blackheath FC
International career
Years	Team	Apps	(Points)
1873-1878	England	10	(Goals:0; Tries:0; Conv:0; Pens:0; Drop:0)

Murray Marshall was a rugby union international who represented England from 1873 to 1878. He also captained his country.

== Early life ==
Murray Wyatt Marshall was born 7 October 1852 in Guildford and baptised on 3 November 1852 in the parish of St Peter and St Paul, Godalming. His parents were Murray (a merchant) and Eliza Marshall. He had two older brothers, George and Bryant, and six younger siblings, Milicent, Lionel Hasler, Oswald Percival, Constance Emily, Octavia and Walter Douglas. After leaving Wellington College he became a timber merchant and married Alice Maud Everitt, eighteen years his junior, in 1892 and they had a daughter, Madelaine.

== Rugby union career ==
Marshall made his international debut on 3 March 1873 at Hamilton Crescent, Glasgow in the Scotland vs England match. Of the 10 matches he played for his national side he was on the winning side on 6 occasions. He played his final match for England on 11 March 1878 at Lansdowne Road in the Ireland vs England match.

In an era where international matches were few and far between, Marshall played in ten consecutive international matches, a record that stood for 36 years. He was described in 1892 as "in every respect one of the best forwards England ever turned out. Possessed of great height and strength, he was invaluable in a scrummage, used his feet well when the ball got loose, and was a very clever tackle."

Sporting positions
Preceded by Edward Kewley	English National Rugby Union Captain; Mar 1878	Succeeded by Frank Reginald Adams
