= Pennyhill Park Hotel =

Building in Surrey, England

Coordinates: 51°21′24″N 0°42′33″W

- Interactive map of the Pennyhill Park Hotel area

General information
- Location: London Road, Bagshot, Surrey, England
- Opening: 1981
- Owner: Exclusive Hotels and Venues

Technical details
- Grounds: 120 acres (0.49 km^{2})

Design and construction
- Developer: James Hodges

Other information
- Number of rooms: 123
- Number of restaurants: 3

Pennyhill Park Hotel is a 19th-century country house hotel and spa in Bagshot, Surrey, in the southeast of England.

== History ==
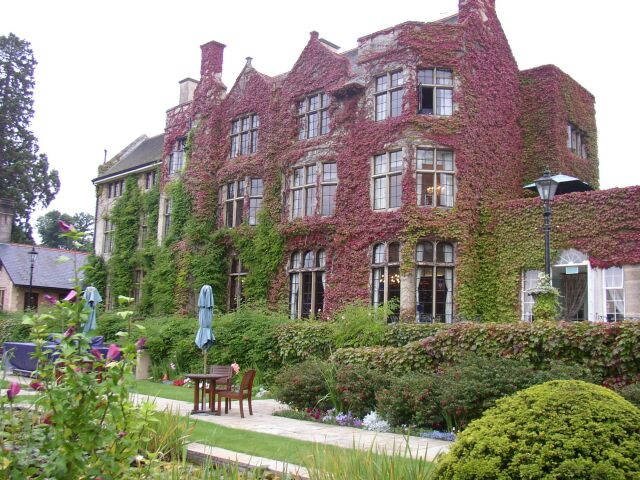
Pennyhill Park Hotel

The first historical reference to Pennyhill Park's land relates to when the site was used as a warning beacon point in the national defence against the Spanish Armada in 1588. The construction of the country house itself was started in 1849 by James Hodges, an accomplished civil engineer who would later manage the construction of Montreal's Victoria Bridge, the longest bridge in the world at the time. The buildings were improved in the 1880s to add in an orangery, and again in 1903 with Bath stonework.

In 1935, then-owner Colin Goldsworthy Heywood developed the terracing of its formal gardens after being impressed by similar work at the Château de Villandry in France. The British government used Pennyhill Park's grounds and its accommodation buildings as lodging for military personnel in World War I (the land is five miles (8 km) from Royal Military Academy Sandhurst). This was mainly for commissioned officers. The country house opened its doors as a hotel in 1972.

== The residents ==
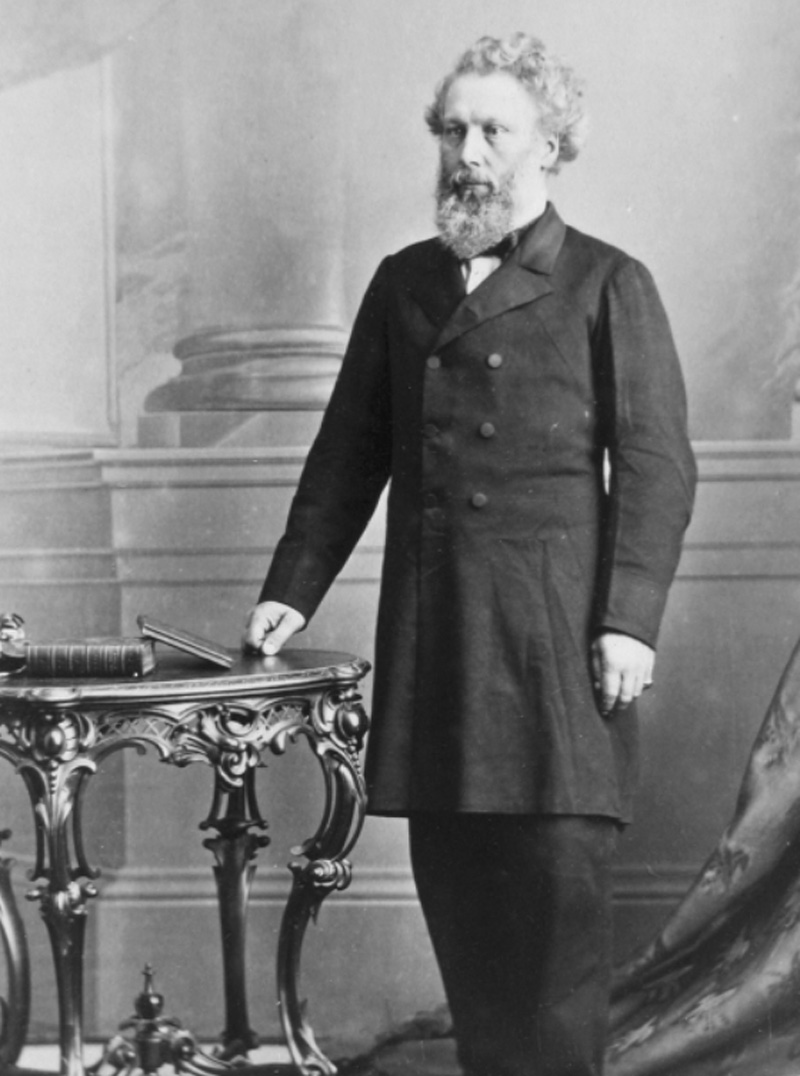
James Hodges

James Hodges (1814-1879) was a civil engineer and built Pennyhill in about 1849. He was born in 1814 in Queenborough, Kent. At an early age he became an apprentice in the building industry and soon turned to railway construction. He participated in ten important projects and became works manager of the South-Eastern Railway Company. After that, as Sir Samuel Morton Peto’s agent, he built suspension bridges at Norwich, Needham, and Somerleyton, accepted a post as engineer, and then undertook the construction of 50 miles (80 km) of track for the Great Northern Railway.

In 1840 he married Louisa Humphrey (1814-1862) who was the daughter of Thomas Humphrey a coach builder from Ashford, Kent. The couple had no children. James’s brother John Oliver Hodges who was also a civil engineer married Louisa’s sister Harriet Humphrey in 1848 and it seems that these two families had a close association.

In 1853 James and Louisa went to Canada and for the next seven years James directed the gigantic task of building a bridge (Victoria Bridge) over the St Lawrence near Montreal. He returned to England in 1860 but unfortunately Louisa died two years later in 1862. James went back to Canada for some time and during this time his brother John Oliver Hodges and his family lived at Pennyhill. James died in 1879 and the house was sold. It was bought by Louis Schott.

Louis Schott (1836-1901) was born in Germany. He came from a family of merchants who specialised in English tulle and lace. He formed a partnership with Louis Floersheim and established a merchant company called Louis Floersheim and Co. They both came to London and in the 1860s and gained naturalisation. In 1868 they went into business with Julian Beer and formed a banking company called Beer and Co. Louis did not marry. He remained a bachelor all of his life. When he died in 1901 he appears to have left his property to Louis Floersheim.

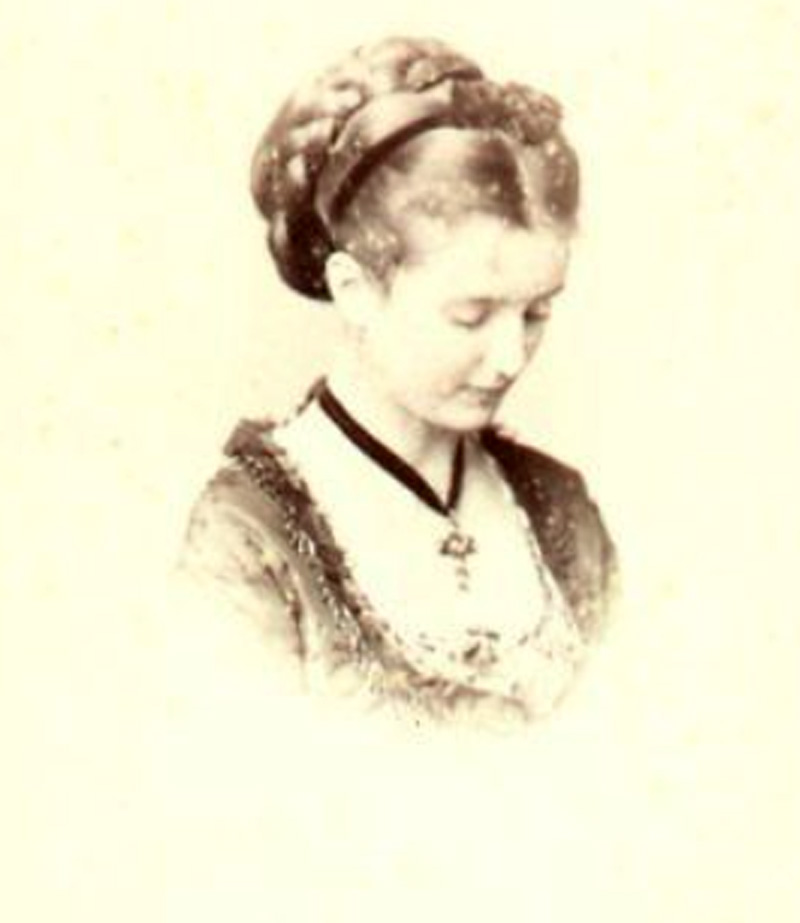
Julia Floersheim, née Baddeley

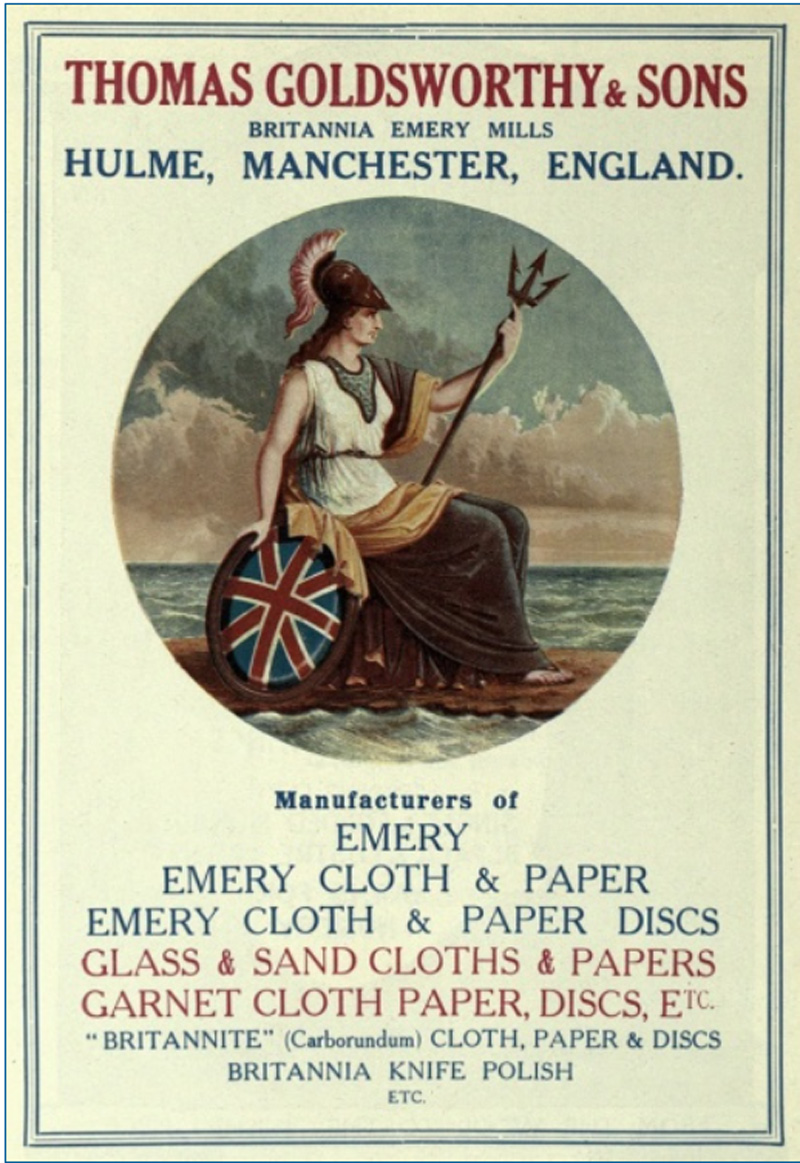
Advertisement for Thomas Goldsworthy and Sons

Louis Floersheim (1834-1917) was born in Germany. After he came to England with his business partner Louis Schott he married in 1870 Julia Baddeley (1848-1931) daughter of Lieutenant Colonel John Fraser Baddeley. The couple lived in London for many years. When they lived at Pennyhill Park after 1901 they retained their London accommodation. He extended the house in 1903 in neo-Tudor style using Bath stone. Louis died in 1917 and Julia continued to live at the house until about 1922.

From 1922 Sir Lindsley Byron Peters (1867-1939) resided at Pennyhill Park. He was born in 1867 in Kent. His father was Gordon Donaldson Peters who founded the firm G. D Peters which was an engineering firm. He was employed in the family company and eventually became a partner and director. He was also a manager of a company called Consolidated Brake and Engineering Co. In 1898 he married Jessie Emmeline Halsted (1871-1952) who was the daughter of Henry Halsted of Chichester who owned an iron foundry. The couple had three children. Lord and Lady Peters lived at Pennyhill Park until about 1933. It was then sold and purchased by Colin Goldsworthy Heywood.

Colin Goldsworthy Heywood (1888-1971) was born in 1888 in Sale Cheshire. He was the son of Frank Heywood who was a wealthy merchant in Manchester. Colin joined the firm of Thomas Goldsworthy and Sons which was an emery cloth and paper manufacturing company in his mother’s family. An advertisement for the company is shown. He became a Director and eventually the Chairman and amassed a large fortune. He did not marry and remained a bachelor all of his life. He lived for about forty years at Pennyhill Park and during that time terraced the formal gardens, the inspiration of which was derived from Chateau de Villandry in Tours.

== Location ==
Pennyhill Park is located in Bagshot, Surrey, southeast of London.
