= Robin Harris (author) =

British author and journalist

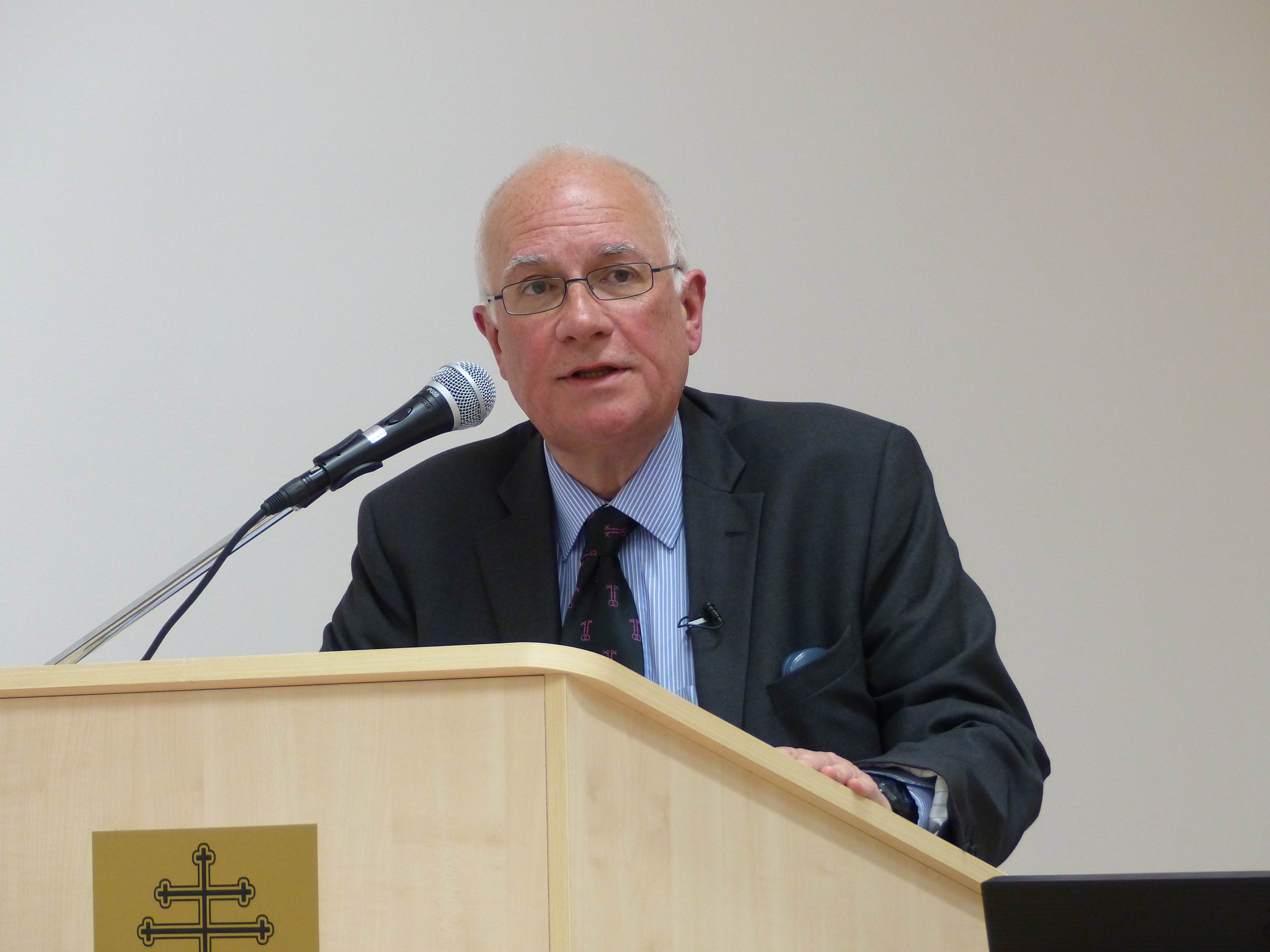
- Robin Harris holding lecture at the Danube Institute
- Born: 22 June 1952 (age 74)
- Education: Exeter College BA, PhD
- Occupations: historian, writer, journalist
- Writing career
- Language: English

Robin Harris (born 22 June 1952) is a British historian, author and journalist. He has written for The Daily Telegraph and Prospect. He attained his undergraduate degree and doctorate in modern history from Exeter College, Oxford University.

== Biography ==
Harris was Director of the Conservative Research Department from 1985 to 1988 and a member of the Prime Minister's Policy Unit from 1989 to 1990. He helped draft the Conservative Party manifesto for the 1987 general election.

It was initially thought that Margaret Thatcher's record in government should be recorded by Harris and John O'Sullivan in a political biography covering her premiership titled Undefeated.

Thatcher hired Harris to write most of her memoir The Downing Street Years. In that memoir Thatcher wrote that Harris was "My indispensable sherpa in the enterprise of writing this book" and that "Without his advice and help at every stage, I doubt that we could have reached the summit". Harris also helped Thatcher write her book Statecraft: Strategies for a Changing World and has written the biography Not for Turning: The Life of Margaret Thatcher.

Harris courted controversy when he wrote a pamphlet (A Tale of Two Chileans) in 1999 defending General Pinochet's coup d'état against the Marxist President of Chile Salvador Allende. In an interview with fellow journalist Andy Beckett in 2000 Harris said: "It was a polarising thing. I was on the Right, and I thought it was a bloody good thing it had happened". In Harris' view, Pinochet was kidnapped and unjustly treated by the Blair government.

In March 2006 he attacked Conservative leader David Cameron in an article for Prospect for what he sees as Cameron's repositioning of the party to the Left. He favourably compared Chancellor of the Exchequer Gordon Brown to Thatcher and claimed both are "immensely able, a workaholic, driven by values from a Protestant upbringing" but that in an election against Brown, Cameron "may look unprincipled and insubstantial".

Andrew Roberts, in a 2007 review, characterised as a "fluent, intelligent and engaging book" Harris' biography of Talleyrand.

Harris was interviewed at length by Nick Higham upon publication of his book The Conservatives - A History when part of the Conservative party appeared to be in rebellion over David Cameron's delay of a referendum on the European Union.

In August 2013, he wrote in defence of the Syriac Christian community, condemning the West's leadership over the "persecution leading to elimination" of that group.

=== On Croatia ===
Harris has strong views about the conflicts seen after the breakup of Yugoslavia. He became interested in Croatia in 1991 after the start of the Croatian War of Independence. He believes Operation Storm was a legitimate operation to free Croatian territory. Harris wrote in February 2006 an article in the American Spectator in which he vehemently attacked the ICTY Hague Tribunal and its indictment against Ante Gotovina. That same year, he was interviewed by the Croatian weekly Nacional upon the release of his book Dubrovnik: A History. He spoke in part about his charge that the ICTY trial of Ante Gotovina by Carla Del Ponte was politically motivated and that if Gotovina were to be convicted, it would mean that Croatian soldiers liberated their country in an illegal action.

Harris was critical of John Major's foreign policy during the Yugoslav wars, which he saw as a continuation of the Foreign Office's old policy of cooperation with the Belgrade regime. According to Harris, it was "laziness, and the biggest mistake of British politics".

Harris has praised Cardinal Alojzije Stepinac, the Archbishop of Zagreb during the Second World War, who he considers a victim of a communist kangaroo court. Harris claims that Stepinac fought against two forms of totalitarianism, fascism and communism.

For a time around 2010, he was a member of the board of the Croatian Center for the Renewal of Culture.

== Publications ==
- The Conservative Community: The Roots of Thatcherism - and its Future (Centre for Policy Studies, 1989).
- The Collected Speeches of Margaret Thatcher (R. Harris, Ed.) (HarperCollins, 1997)
- A Tale of Two Chileans - Pinochet and Allende (Chilean Supporters Abroad, 1999).
- Dubrovnik: A History (Saqi, London 2003). As paperback 2006, ISBN 978-0-86356-959-3.
- Croatia: A History. From Revolution to Independence. As paperback 2024, ISBN 978-953-0-62407-8.
- Beyond Friendship: The Future of Anglo-American Relations (Heritage Foundation, 2006)
- Talleyrand: Betrayer And Saviour Of France (2007)
- The Conservatives - A History (Bantam Press, 2011).
- Not for Turning: The Life of Margaret Thatcher (Bantam, 2013) ISBN 978-0593058916
- Stepinac: His Life and Times, Gracewing, 2016
