= Lainston House =

Country house in Sparsholt, Hampshire, England, UK

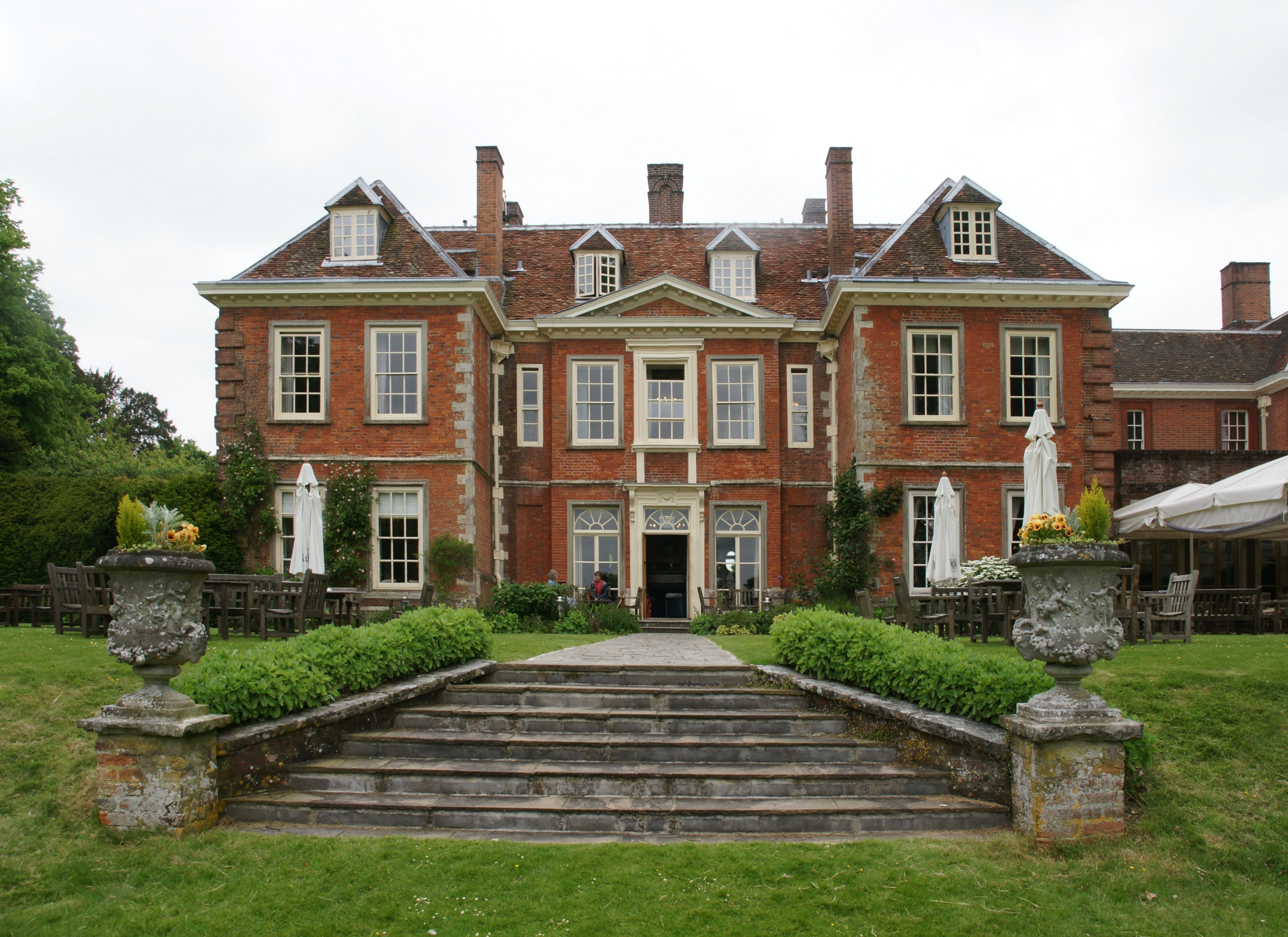
- Lainston House seen from the east

- Location within Hampshire

General information
- Location: Woodman Lane, Sparsholt, Winchester, Hampshire, SO21 2LT, United Kingdom
- Coordinates: 51°4′56″N 1°22′9″W
- Opening: 1981
- Owner: Exclusive Hotels and Venues

Technical details
- Grounds: 63 acres (250,000 m^{2})

Design and construction
- Developer: Christopher Wren

Other information
- Number of rooms: 50

Lainston House is a 17th-century country house hotel near Sparsholt, Hampshire in the south of England. It is operated by the Exclusive Hotels chain. It is a Grade II* listed building.

== History ==
Lainston House is notable for several reasons in its history. Commissioned by Charles II to build a palace at Winchester, renowned English architect Sir Christopher Wren may have started work on the site in 1683 by building on the grounds of an earlier medieval dwelling. It became known as the home of Charles and his mistress Louise de Keroualle before he died in 1685.

In August 1744 Elizabeth Chudleigh and Augustus Hervey were secretly married in Lainston House's private chapel, causing a society scandal. Maintaining privacy about the ceremony lest their employment be endangered, their union did not last and Elizabeth went on to marry Evelyn Pierrepont, 2nd Duke of Kingston-upon-Hull. The validity of the ceremony held at Lainston House's chapel became the focal point of bigamy charges and legal proceedings against Elizabeth which pursued her until her death in 1788.

Lainston House's tree-lined grounds also contain the longest line of limes in England (9/10ths of a mile), some of which were planted in 1716. The trees were planted in the grounds after the influence of gardener and diarist Sir John Evelyn.

Lainston House and its parkland was sold off from private ownership in the 1980s, and currently operates as a luxury 5 star hotel.

Dominic Johnson, Baron Johnson of Lainston took his title from the building which was his mother's family home.
