= The Path to Power (Thatcher book) =

Memoir by Margaret Thatcher

- Author: Margaret Thatcher
- Language: English
- Genre: Memoir
- Published: 1 June 1995
- Publisher: HarperCollins
- Publication place: United Kingdom
- Media type: Print (Hardback)
- Pages: 656
- ISBN: 0002550504

The Path to Power is a memoir by former prime minister of the United Kingdom Margaret Thatcher, covering her life from her birth in 1925 until she became prime minister in 1979.

== History ==
Most of the book covers her life up until her election victory in 1979, but she added on about 150 pages at the end giving her opinions on current affairs on the years since she resigned as prime minister in 1990. Although Thatcher avoided personal attacks on her successor John Major, she clearly believed that he had squandered her legacy and was pursuing un-Thatcherite policies. The book was serialised in The Sunday Times where the apparent attacks on the Major government were sensationalised.

== Reception ==
In interviews to promote the book, Thatcher claimed that the Conservatives had lost their way because they were "not being Conservative enough". In the book Thatcher wrote that: "I offer some thoughts about putting these things right. It is now, however, for others to take the action required". These words—similar to those used by Geoffrey Howe in 1990 which had precipitated her downfall—led to Major on 22 June resigning as Conservative leader and calling a leadership election. John Redwood stood against Major. Thatcher was in America at the time of the first ballot and she remained neutral, claiming that both Major and Redwood were "good Conservatives".

Talking to her close friend Woodrow Wyatt on 22 May 1995, Thatcher said to him that the Sunday Times "distorted what I wrote" and that her line about policies being carried out by others meant not replacing Major but the whole Western world, the Council of Europe, etc. Later that day, Major said to Wyatt: "I'm bloody angry and I'm going to give her a hell of an attack and go for her". In his memoirs, Major wrote: "Her descriptions of a Grantham childhood were harmless enough, but the book contained an epilogue, unrelated to the title or scope of the book itself, which could only be interpreted as an attack on my own policies. Such blows from my predecessor were impossible to disregard, since every interviewer raised them with me at every opportunity, as she must have known they would".

== See also ==
- The Downing Street Years
- Statecraft: Strategies for a Changing World

== Notes ==
=== Sources ===
- Campbell, John (2003), Margaret Thatcher, Volume II: The Iron Lady, Jonathan Cape, ISBN 0099516772
- Major, John (2000), The Autobiography, HarperCollins, ISBN 0006530745
- Wyatt, Woodrow (2001), The Journals of Woodrow Wyatt. Volume Three, Pan, ISBN 033377406X
