= Exclusive Hotels =

Hotel chain based in Surrey, England

- Industry: Hotel chain
- Founder: Guiseppe Pecorelli
- Headquarters: Surrey, England
- Key people: Danny Pecorelli
- Website: www.exclusive.co.uk

Exclusive Collection is a hotel chain based in Surrey, England. The hotel group has a portfolio of several hotels across the south, and operates mainly in the five star sector.

== History ==
The group has owned Pennyhill Park in Surrey since 1982, and bought Lainston House in Hampshire the following year. South Lodge in West Sussex was purchased in July 1985, after the last of the descendants of the original owner, Frederick DuCane Godman, died.

In May 2011, the group bought Royal Berkshire, located in Ascot. The hotel group also owns Manor House in Wiltshire and Fanhams Hall in Ware, Hertfordshire, The Castle Inn in Castle Combe and Ansty Hall in North Warwickshire.

== Awards ==
The group won the 'AA Small Hotel Group of the Year' for 2009–2010. The properties in the group collection also employ a number of high-profile chefs.
