= Menace in Europe =

2006 book by Claire Berlinski

Menace in Europe: Why the Continent's Crisis Is America's, Too
- Author: Claire Berlinski
- Language: English
- Publisher: Three Rivers Press
- Publication date: 2006
- Publication place: United States
- ISBN: 978-1-4000-9768-5
- OCLC: 62878664
- Dewey Decimal: 940.56/1 22
- LC Class: D2020 .B47 2006

Menace in Europe: Why the Continent's Crisis Is America's, Too is a book by Claire Berlinski about problems and challenges facing Europe, and the consequences of Europe's failure to meet these challenges. Among the phenomena addressed in the book are Muslim integration (and the lack thereof), anti-Americanism, antisemitism, and Europe's violent history.

== Reception ==
The book has been cited several times as a segment of "Eurabia literature".

New Oxford Review, "one can't read [Menace in Europe] and walk away optimistic about the future of Europe.

Conservative think tank writer Fred Siegel wrote, "it's hard to do full justice to the rich material in [Menace in Europe]. Ms. Berlinski...has a fascinating chapter on the Nazi aesthetic of Rammstein, Germany's most popular band. But if [Menace in Europe has] any weaknesses it is the lack of a historical framework.

Clive Davis wrote in Washington Times, "what worries me about books like this is that they risk reducing Europe to a caricature in much the same way as Stupid White Men turns America into one big Wal-Mart with drive-by shootings."

National Review piece reads, "her observation that there is nothing Americans can do to change [Europe], "short of dying politely en masse," suggests that Ms. Berlinski, a lively writer always happy to hype up the snark and the spark of her prose, is taking her readers not to France, or Germany, but to Planet Coulter.

Baltimore Chronicle's John Hickman said that a "better example of the essential emptiness of neo-conservatism than Claire Berlinski's Menace in Europe would be difficult to find...ugly vituperation expressed in sweeping generalizations...Berlinski cherry-picks her evidence.
