= Edward Kewley =

England international rugby union player & cricketer

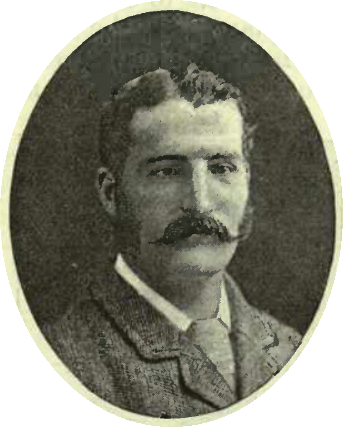
- Born: Edward Kewley; 20 June 1852 Farnham Royal, Buckinghamshire, England
- Died: 17 April 1940 (aged 87) Winchester, Hants, England
- School: Marlborough College

Rugby union career
- Position: Forward
Senior career
| Years | Team | Apps | (Points) |
- Liverpool Football Club
| – | Lancashire | | |
International career
| Years | Team | Apps | (Points) |
| 1874–1878 | England | 7 | |

Edward Kewley (20 June 1852 – 17 April 1940) was an English sportsman who played rugby union for England and also played first-class cricket for Lancashire. He captained England three times, and was the first captain to be drawn from the north of England as well as captaining England in the first ever 15-a-side international.

== Early life ==
Edward Kewley was born in Farnham Royal on 20 June 1852, to Thomas Kewley, curate of Farnham Royal, and his wife Jane. He was educated at Marlborough College and on leaving school he travelled to his father's home county of Lancashire to pursue a career in the cotton industry as a cotton broker. The style of rugby taught at Marlborough in the 1870s favoured kicking and dribbling rather than handling. This was at a time when a number of varying interpretations of the game existed. It was only when the Rugby Football Union was formed in 1871 and began to create uniformity that clubs and schools began to play similar forms.

== Rugby career ==
Kewley played his rugby for Liverpool Football Club, the world's oldest open rugby club. The club had been founded in 1857 and was aligned to the rugby code rather than association football. It was in no way a predecessor to the association football club, Liverpool F.C. He was selected as one of the 14 forwards for the fourth ever game against Scotland on 23 February 1874. He missed the next game, the first England-Ireland international on 15 February 1875, but was recalled to play against Scotland on 8 March 1875. He kept his place and in 1877 was selected as captain. His first game as captain was in the landmark match of 5 February 1877 against Ireland at the Oval. This game was the first international following the Law change that reduced the teams to 15 players and thus was the first 15-a-side international. England won the match 2 goals and 2 tries to nil. Kewley went on to captain England twice more against Scotland. He was the first player from the north of England to captain the national side.

Kewley later continued to focus much energy on the game after he retired from playing. He encouraged the formation of new clubs and he was made honorary secretary, honorary treasurer and president of Liverpool Football Club. He was also elected to the first committee of the Lancashire County Football Club in 1881 and later became president. Additionally, he was elected the fourth vice-president of the RFU.

== Cricket ==
Kewley not only had the distinction of playing for and captaining his country in rugby. His sporting prowess saw him selected to play for Lancashire as a right-handed batsman. Kewley made his only first-class appearance against Kent in 1875. He scored just three runs with the bat and took one catch during the game. His dedication to rugby diverted him from developing his cricketing career.

== Personal life ==
Edward Kewley died in Winchester on 17 April 1940, aged 87.

Sporting positions
| Preceded by Francis Luscombe | English National Rugby Union Captain; 1877-Mar 1878 | Succeeded by Murray Wyatt Marshall |
