= The Downing Street Years =

Memoir by Margaret Thatcher

- First hardcover edition
- Author: Margaret Thatcher
- Language: English
- Genre: Memoir
- Published: 18 October 1993
- Publisher: HarperCollins
- Publication place: United Kingdom
- Media type: Print (Hardback)
- Pages: 914
- ISBN: 0002550490

The Downing Street Years is a memoir by Margaret Thatcher, former Prime Minister of the United Kingdom, covering her premiership of 1979 to 1990. It was accompanied by a four-part BBC television series of the same name.

== History ==
Thatcher's close friend Woodrow Wyatt recounted in his diary on 3 February 1989 a conversation he had with Rupert Murdoch who wanted Thatcher to write her equivalent of Mikhail Gorbachev's Perestroika, explaining her philosophy and that John O'Sullivan could do all the "donkey work" for her. Wyatt countered this by stating that the chairman of the publishing house Collins had tried to get him to persuade Thatcher to publish her memoirs with Collins and Thatcher herself seemed favourable to this option. The next day Wyatt put Murdoch's idea to Thatcher but she claimed she did not have the time.

On 29 November 1990, the day after Thatcher's resignation as Prime Minister, Wyatt told her of Murdoch's suggestion of O'Sullivan as a helper, to which Thatcher responded: "What a wonderful idea. That would be marvellous". On 6 November Thatcher told Wyatt that George Weidenfeld of publishers Weidenfeld & Nicolson had approached her about her memoirs but Wyatt warned her off him and advocated doing a deal with Murdoch. Thatcher replied: "I would prefer to do it with Rupert because he has been so wonderful and supportive of me, even if I do it for a little less". On 11 December Wyatt recorded that Murdoch had visited Thatcher but that she had not made up her mind about what sort of book she would write and that she would not accept an advance on a book she had not started writing. Murdoch said she was the first author who he had heard would not do that.

On 28 January 1991 Thatcher told Wyatt that she wanted to deal with Murdoch directly and did not really want an agent. However, by 23 March Wyatt was writing that Thatcher "seemed to be all over the shop now with her book" and he said to Murdoch that he thought she was going to do a deal with him but "Now she is apparently putting out tenders to publishers and agents". Murdoch replied: "Yes, it's Mark Thatcher, the son, who has taken charge of her affairs and she is doing everything he tells her. He has even got a Maxwell publisher (Macmillan of New York) on the list. When people talked about getting three to four million for her memoirs, Mark replied that he could get more than double that, eight to ten million. Good luck to him if he can but I don't think he will". On 26 April Wyatt was writing that Mark Thatcher "has fouled everything up with people who might help her write it and publishers and all the rest of it". On 9 May Wyatt was still despondent: "I am desperately worried about her. I feel that Mark has mucked up her chances of a quick, high-priced sale for her memoirs".

Mark Thatcher openly talked of getting eight, ten or even twenty million for his mother's memoirs, which was more than Murdoch was willing to pay. In his dealings with Murdoch's rival Robert Maxwell, Mark Thatcher apparently had a one million fee for himself. On 21 April 1991 Murdoch used the front page of The Sunday Times to denounce his interference. Thatcher was indignant and said to Wyatt: "How can Rupert do this to me?" Murdoch told Wyatt later that day: "None of her friends dare tell her what a dreadful mess Mark is making of her affairs"

However, in June the Maxwell deal fell through and a week after this Mrs Thatcher signed to Marvin Josephson, an American agent, who quickly accepted a £3.5 million deal with HarperCollins for two books to be published in 1993 and 1995. The publishing world believed that Mark Thatcher had got the worst of both worlds by demanding too much at first and then losing the prime moment by dithering in the negotiations while the value of the memoirs declined.

Thatcher had eighteen months to write the book covering her premiership. She hired a previous director of the Conservative Research Department, Robin Harris, to do most of the writing, the Oxford academic Christopher Collins to do the research and O'Sullivan to help polish the drafts. Just like with her speeches, Thatcher would "edit, criticise and exhaustively rewrite the drafts" until she was happy.

Some sources believe that Thatcher wrote at least part of the book at the Manor House Hotel, in Castle Combe, in the Full Glass bar.

== Reception ==
The Downing Street Years were published on 18 October 1993, timed to coincide with the Conservative Party conference. It was serialised in The Sunday Times on the Sunday after the conference closed. There were rumours the book would not be helpful to her successor, John Major, and these were confirmed when the Daily Mirror leaked her views that Major had "swallowed ... the slogans of the European lobby ... intellectually ... [he] was drifting with the tide". The editor of The Times, Simon Jenkins, denounced her criticisms of Major. However at the conference Thatcher tried hard to be loyal to Major and she was even seen greeting Michael Heseltine. After Major made a speech saying he was going "back to basics", Thatcher praised him for returning to "the true path of Conservatism".

Thatcher was interviewed with David Frost on Breakfast with Frost about her memoirs, and she promoted her book with radio and television interviews, book signings, a question and answer session at the Barbican chaired by Jeffrey Archer and a four-part BBC television series.

Geoffrey Howe reviewed the book in the Financial Times, Nigel Lawson in the Evening Standard, Douglas Hurd in The Spectator, Norman Tebbit in the Daily Mail and Bernard Ingham in the Daily Express.

One of her biographers, John Campbell, wrote of the book:

The book has its longueurs, but it is still by far the most comprehensive and readable of modern prime ministerial memoirs: partisan of course, but generally a clear and vivid account of her side of the arguments. Of course it aggrandises her role, exaggerates the degree to which she knew where she was going from the beginning, slides over her moments of doubt and hesitation and diminishes the role of most of her colleagues, aides and advisers. It is a shockingly ungenerous book, shot through with gratuitously withering comments not only about people like Michael Heseltine and Geoffrey Howe whom she had some cause to feel bitter about, but also about other inoffensive colleagues who had served her well. Only Willie Whitelaw, Keith Joseph and Denis are beyond criticism, plus of course Bernard Ingham and Charles Powell. Other officials are barely mentioned. Nevertheless The Downing Street Years is a good record.

== See also ==
- The Path to Power (Thatcher book)

== Notes ==
=== Sources ===
- Campbell, John (2003), Margaret Thatcher, Volume II: The Iron Lady, Jonathan Cape, ISBN 0099516772
- Wyatt, Woodrow (2000), The Journals of Woodrow Wyatt. Volume Two, Pan, ISBN 0333774051
