= The Manor House, Castle Combe =

Hotel in Wiltshire, England

The Manor House
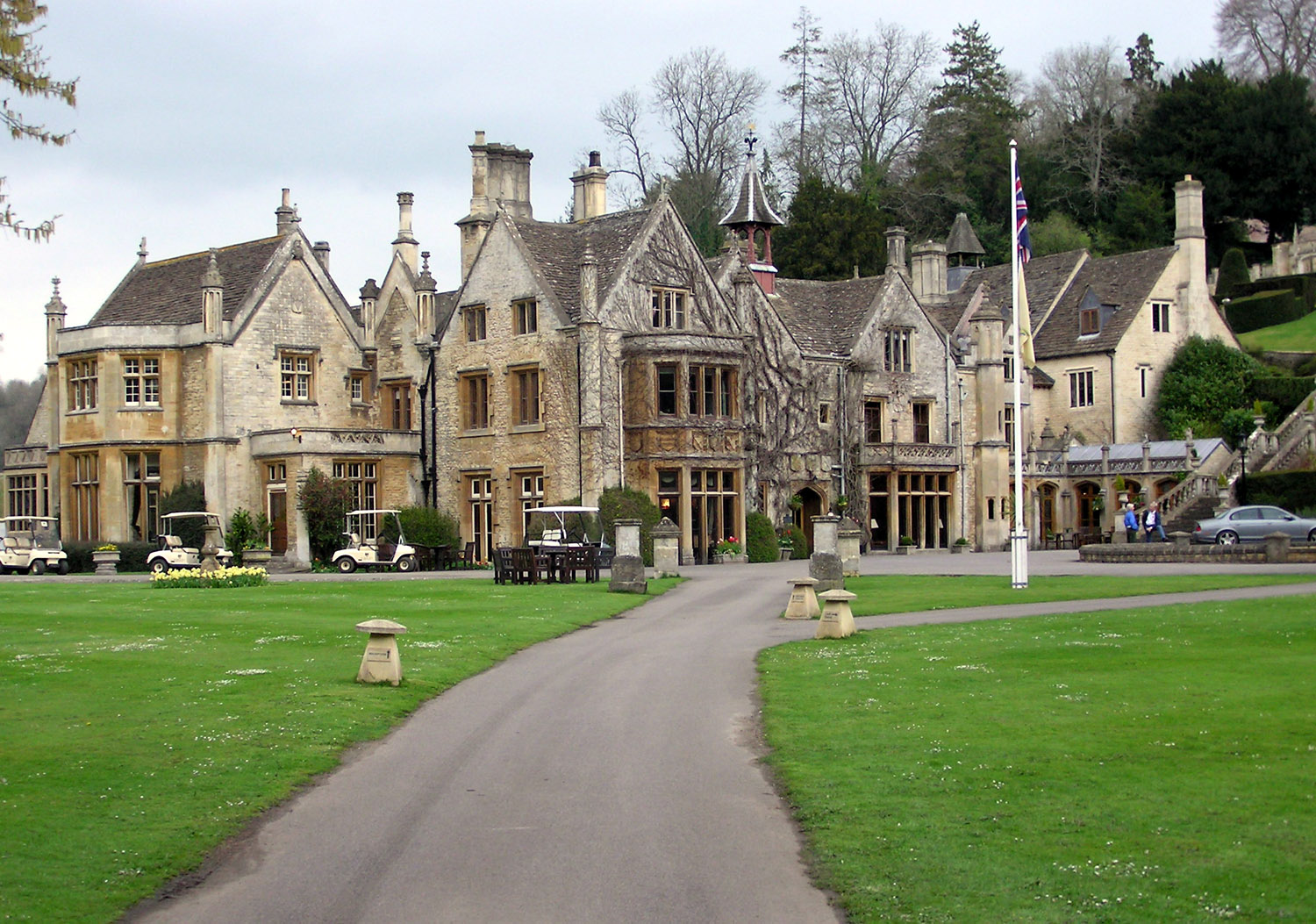
- Interactive map of the The Manor House area

General information
- Location: Castle Combe, Wiltshire, SN14 7HR, United Kingdom
- Coordinates: 51.4937°N 2.2322°W
- Opening: 1947
- Owner: Exclusive Hotels and Venues

Website
- www.exclusive.co.uk/the-manor-house/

The Manor House is a 17th-century country house hotel in Castle Combe, Wiltshire in the south of England.

== History ==
The Manor House is noteworthy for several reasons throughout history. Its land is the site of a Norman castle settlement which hosted a number of Lords, the most famous of whom was Sir John Oldcastle, the figure on which the character of Sir John Falstaff is based in the late 16th-century Shakespeare play Henry IV, Part 1.

It was the home of English geologist and political economist George Poulett Scrope in the 19th century. He lived at The Manor House from the start in 1821 of his first marriage until the death of his wife Emma (the great-granddaughter of Sir Robert Long) in 1866; his wife's family had owned the land since the 14th century. Scrope had the house heavily rebuilt between 1826 and 1830. He was also responsible for the creation of the formal gardens, where a summerhouse incorporates fragments of medieval stone, and a 15th-century church bell-cote shelters a garden seat. The gardens to the east of the house were remodelled in Italian style by a later owner, E. C. Lowndes, who made further alterations to the house in the 1870s.

During the Second World War, the New Zealand Forestry Officers used The Manor House as their headquarters, while a part of it was used as a hospital. In 1947, the owner of the Castle Combe estate sold the houses of the estate, and The Manor House became a country club. After 18 months, the club left the premises, and the house was shortly thereafter sold to Bobbie Allen, an amateur hotelier, and her husband (the Major). Over time, they established The Manor House as a country house hotel, run almost as a club. One source indicates that the conversion to a hotel occurred shortly after the war.

A quite glamorous clientele ensued. Certain of the London hotels would refer guests in search of authentic England to The Manor House. Bobbie Allen was a horsewoman, and the grounds of The Manor House were known for their suitability for riding. Mrs. Allen was from Lancashire and was known for her directness. She wrote a book about her experiences, From Claridge's to Castle Combe, self-published in 1968, which reflects her character and the post-War era of the community and the hotel.She includes many anecdotes about guests during that time including author Robin Maugham, equestrian show jumpers Pat Smythe, Harry Llewellyn, and American author and politician Clare Boothe Luce

After many years, the Allens sold The Manor House to Mr. and Mrs. Oliver Clegg who, in 1988, sold it to the corporation which now owns the property. By the time it was listed as a Grade II building in 1960, it was already operating as a hotel.

Some sources state that Margaret Thatcher wrote at least some of her memoirs, The Downing Street Years, in the manor's Full Glass bar.
