= South Lodge Hotel =

- Interactive map of the South Lodge Hotel area

General information
- Location: Brighton Road, Horsham, West Sussex, RH13 6PS
- Coordinates: 51.01518°N 0.26382°W
- Opening: 1985
- Owner: Exclusive Hotels and Venues

Technical details
- Grounds: 93 acres (380,000 m^{2})

Design and construction
- Developer: James Hodges

Other information
- Number of rooms: 88
- Number of restaurants: 3

The South Lodge Hotel is a 19th-century five star country house hotel set near Horsham, West Sussex in the south of England.

The hotel has also been used in a number of feature films including the 2014 film A Dark Reflection.

== History ==
In 1883, Frederick DuCane Godman began development on the original South Lodge modest dwelling in the same neo-Jacobean style as many other Sussex country houses of the period. Godman commenced the final substantial additions to the building in 1911 when the Drawing Room Wing was constructed. Winston Churchill was a regular guest to the house during his time in Parliament and to commemorate this the corridor through to the newly developed Sussex Wing from the Billiard Bar now marks the place where a lift used to take him up to the Elizabeth Le Bay room. During World War II South Lodge was used as a hospital and the country house opened as a hotel in 1985.

== Grounds ==
The hotel is set in 93 acres (380,000 m^{2}) of woodland and has the largest single Rhododendron Arboreum in England. The record breaking plant is over 150 years old and currently measures 25 feet (7.6 m) tall.

== Location ==
South Lodge is located southeast of Horsham, West Sussex in the south of England.
