= Henry Cadwallader Adams =

Henry Cadwaller Adams
- Born: 4 November 1817
- Died: 17 October 1899 (aged 81)
- Occupations: Cleric, Writer
- Writing career
- Period: 19th century
- Genre: Children's Literature

Reverend Henry Cadwallader Adams (4 November 1817 – 17 October 1899) was a 19th-century English cleric, schoolmaster and writer of children's novels.

He was the grandson of Simon Adams of Ansty Hall, Warwickshire. He was educated at Westminster School, Winchester College, Balliol College (1835) and Magdalen College, Oxford (1836), becoming a fellow of Magdalen in 1843. After some time as a Commoner Tutor at Winchester, in 1855 he became chaplain of Bromley College, an almshouse for the widows of clergy.

== Works ==
=== Fiction ===
Adams wrote children's novels, specialising in tales of Victorian Public School life and adventures in far-flung parts of Empire. His novels included:

- The Cherry-stones, or Charlton School (1851)
- Who Did It?, or Holmwood Priory. A Schoolboy's Tale (1852)
- Sivan the Sleeper (1857)
- Schoolboy Honour; a tale of Halminster College (1861)
- The Indian Boy (1865)
- Balderscourt, or Holiday Tales (1866)
- Falconshurst; or, Birthday tales (1869)
- Hair-breadth escapes, or, The adventures of three boys in South Africa London: Griffith & Farran (1876)
- The Boy Cavaliers, or The Siege of Clidesford (1878)
- The Winborough Boys, or Ellerslie Park (1879)
- Charlie Lucken, at School and College London: Hodder & Stoughton (1886)
- Perils in the Transvaal and Zululand London: Griffith, Farran, Okeden & Welsh (1887)
- Travellers' Tales: a book of marvels (1883)
- Wroxby College, Or, the Luscombe Prize: A Tale of Boy Life
- School and University; Or, Dolph Woodward
- The Mystery of Beechey Grange Or the Missing Host: A Tale for Boys
- College days at Oxford, or, Wilton of Cuthbert's (1887)
- The Lost Rifle, or, Schoolboy Faction
- Schooldays at Kingscourt

=== School textbooks ===
- A New Greek Delectus, London, 3rd edition (1855)
- Greek Exercises, Adapted to Adams's Greek Delectus, and Wordsworth's Greek Grammar (1856)
- A New Latin Delectus: Adapted to the Arrangement of the Eton, and Edward the Sixth's Latin Grammars (1857)
- Latin Exercises, Adapted to the Arrangement of the Eton and Edward VI's Grammars, and Adams's Latin Delectus
- Adams's Principia Graeca, Being a Grammar and Delectus Combined (1871)

=== Religious ===
- The Greek text of the Gospels: with prolegomena, notes and references, for the use of schools and colleges (1886)
- The Judges of Israel, or Tales for Sunday Reading
- Sunday Evenings at Home (1880)
- Sundays at Encombe
- The History of the Jews from the war with Rome to the present time (1887)

=== Poetry ===
- The twelve foundations and other poems (1859)

=== Other ===
- Wykehamica: A History of Winchester College and Commoners: Oxford, London and Winchester (1878)
