= Royal Berkshire Hotel =

Country house hotel in Berkshire, England

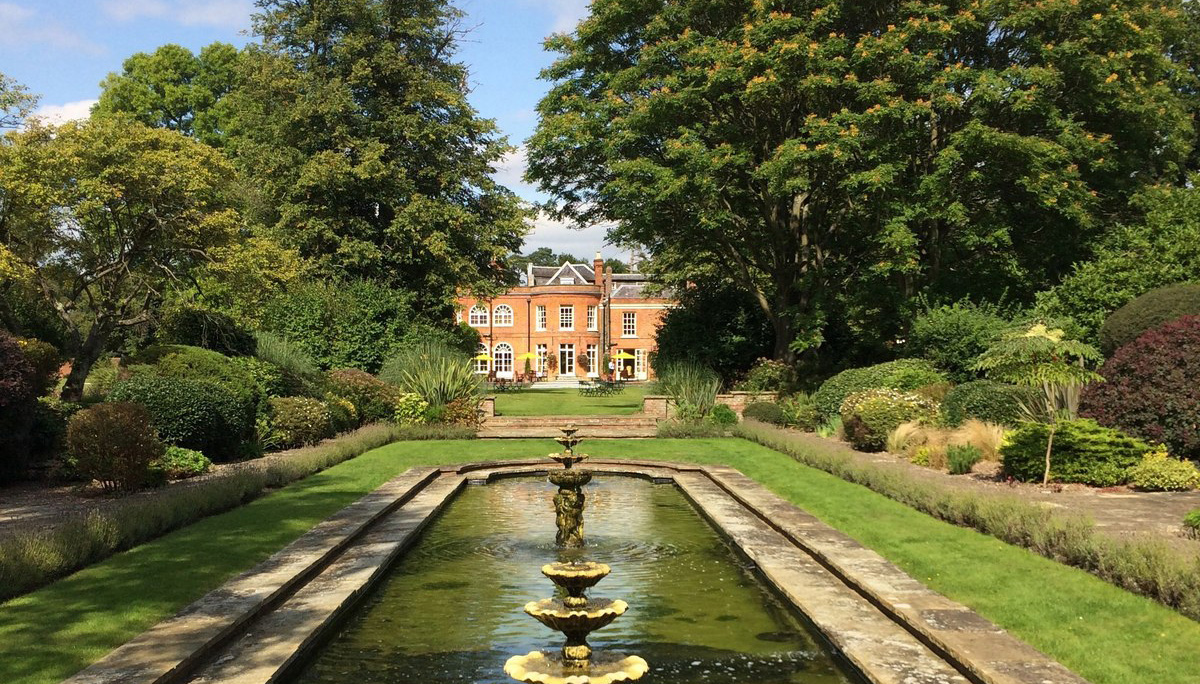
- Royal Berkshire Hotel

- Location within Berkshire
- Hotel chain: Exclusive Hotels

General information
- Location: London Road; Sunninghill; Ascot; Berkshire; SL5 0PP; United Kingdom
- Coordinates: 51°24′30.2″N 0°38′6.7″W
- Opening: 1705

The Royal Berkshire Hotel is a country house hotel within a noteworthy example of a late Queen Anne mansion previously called The Oaks and located at Ascot in the English county of Berkshire.

== Overview ==
The red-brick mansion was originally built in 1705 as the home of Sir Robert Walpole's daughter, Lady Mary, and Charles Churchill, great nephew of the first Duke of Marlborough and relation of Sir Winston Churchill.

The building was named The Oaks for many years after its construction, but became known as Little Paddocks at the start of the 20th century when it was owned by Colonel Sir James Horlick (of the malted milk hot drink company) until his family decided to donate the grounds to serve as a school for the blind. The building stayed as a school until the late 1960s, and the modern day tennis courts within the grounds are the final resting location of several of the facility's guide dogs.

Modern use of the building as a hotel began in 1971, when the Hoffman family, experienced European hoteliers, renovated the property.

In 2011, the property was purchased by Exclusive Hotels, via the group's sister brand EH Venues.

== The Churchill family ==
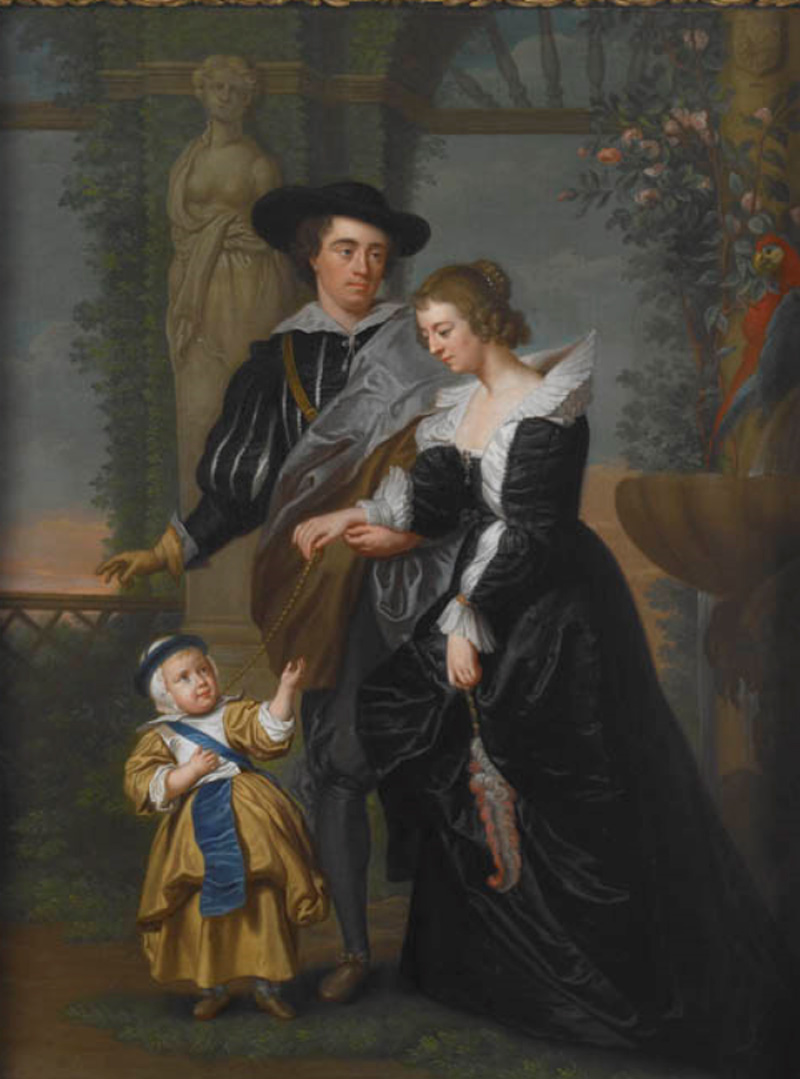
Charles Churchill (1720-1812) with his wife Lady Mary Walpole (sometimes called Maria) and their son Charles Churchill (1747-1786)

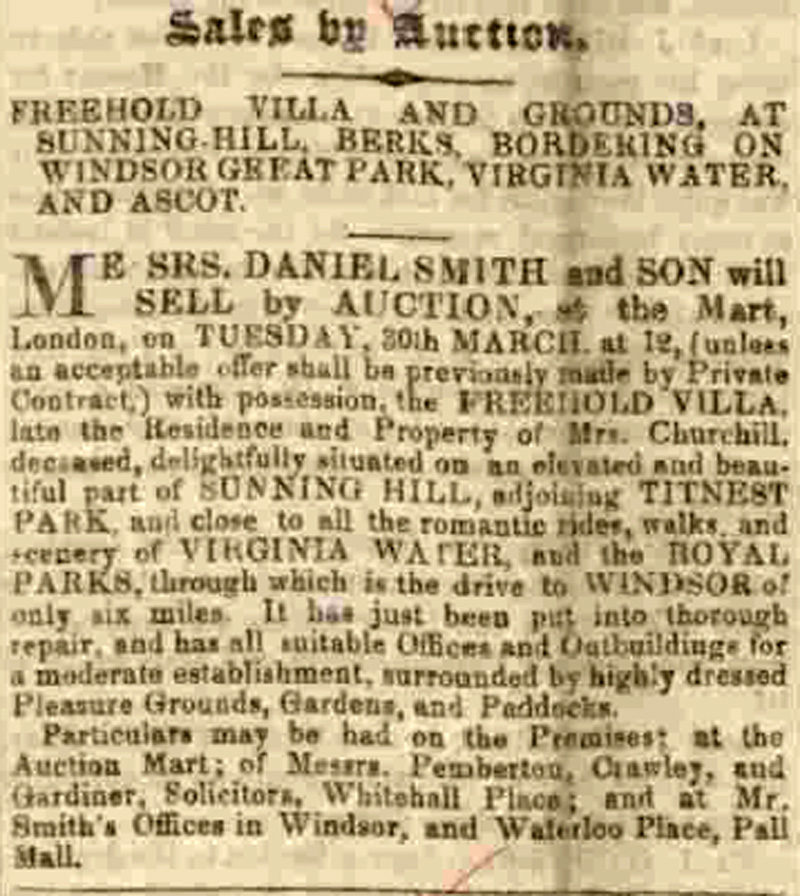
Advertisement for the sale of the house in 1847

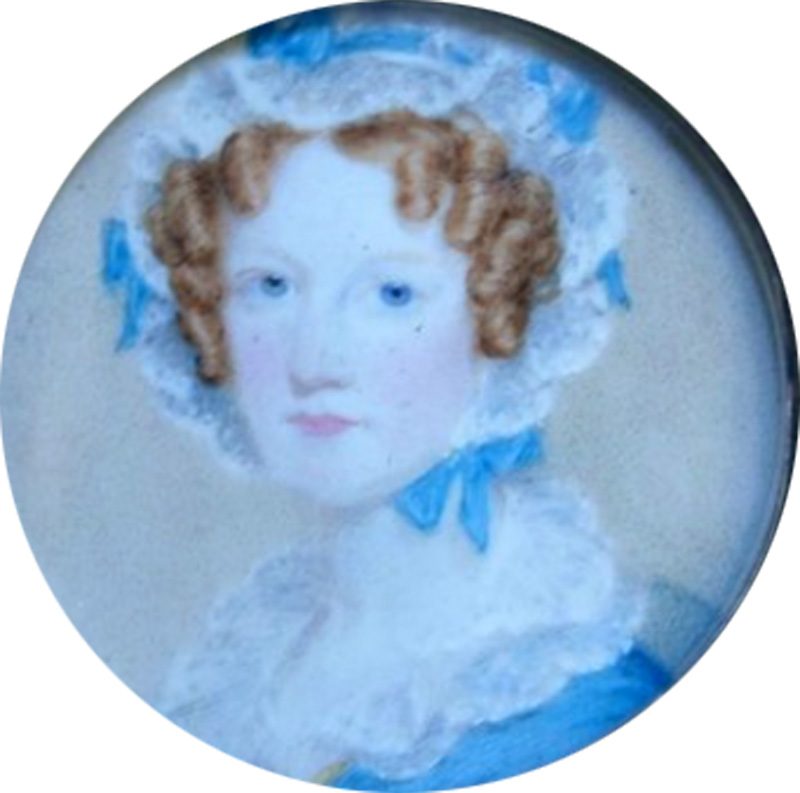
Mary Helen Churchill who lived with her mother Joanna at the House in the early 1800s

The Churchill family built the Royal Berkshire Hotel, Sunninghill in 1705 and one of the earliest residents was Charles Churchill and his wife Lady Mary Churchill who was the daughter of the Prime Minister Sir Robert Walpole.

Charles Churchill (1720-1812) was the son of Lieutenant-General Charles Churchill (1679-1745) and Anne Oldfield. In his youth he joined the military and became a Colonel. He then resigned and became a Member of Parliament. He was closely associated with the Walpole family and in 1846 married Lady Mary (sometimes called Maria) Walpole the favourite daughter of Sir Robert Walpole. The pair were frequent visitors to Strawberry Hill House which was the residence of Horace Walpole, Mary's half-brother. A painting that was hanging in the Strawberry Hill house depicting the couple and their eldest son Charles Churchill (1747-1786) is shown. Lady Mary became housekeeper at the nearby Windsor Castle and held this position for over twenty years.

Lady Mary died in 1801 and her husband in 1812. The Sunninghill house appears to have been inherited by their eldest son Charles Churchill (1747-1786) as there is a record of his wife and only daughter Mary living there in the early 1800s.

Charles Churchill (1747-1786) was born in 1747. In 1769 he married Joanna Murray who was the daughter of Sir Patrick Murray (1707-1764), 4th Baronet of Ochertyre. The couple had three children two sons (who died when young) and one daughter Mary Helen Churchill. Charles became a Colonel in the military forces and in 1784 obtained a post in Calcutta India as the Secretary of the Governor General. Unfortunately he died two years later in 1786 at the age of only 39. His wife and daughter Mary who did not marry appear to have lived in the Sunninghill house together for some time. Mary inherited a substantial fortune from her grandfather in 1814. She died in 1830 and left large sums of money to her relatives. Joanna her mother died in 1846 at the age of 94. The house was then sold. The notice of sale which was placed in the newspapers is shown.

== Later residents ==
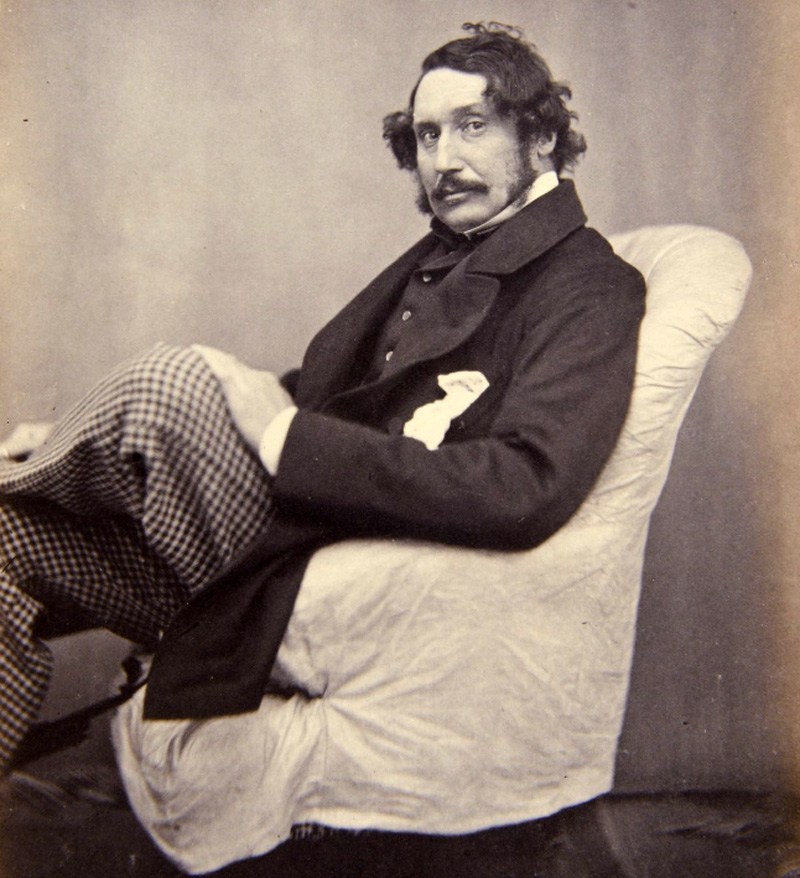
Lieutenant Colonel Robert Blane

The house was bought by Colonel Robert Blane (1809-1871) who appears to have called it “The Oaks”. Robert was born in 1809 in Winkfield. His father was William Blane who owned Winkfield Park. He entered the Army in 1831 and quickly rose through the ranks. In 1845 he married Margaret Rose Ames (1817-1893). The couple had no children.

He went to the Crimean War in 1854 and fought in many of the famous battles. In recognition of his services he was invested as a Companion of the Order of the Bath, a Knight of the Legion of Honour and several other distinctions. Robert died in 1871.

The 1881 Census shows that Sir Robert Sheffield 5th Baronet of Normanby and his wife and family were residents of the property. Soon after the House was bought by Hannah Entwisle (1817-1907) who was a widow. Hannah was born Hannah Loyd in 1817. Her father was Edward Loyd who was a banker. In 1834 she married William Entwisle who joined her father's banking firm. The couple lived in Rusholme House near Manchester which was the seat of the Entwisle family. In 1865 William died at the age of 48. Hannah lived at “The Oaks” for about twenty five years until her death in 1907.

The 1911 Census shows that the next resident was Colonel Guy Stewart St Aubyn (1870-1924). He is still listed in the 1915 Kelly Directory of Berkshire.

== The Horlick family ==
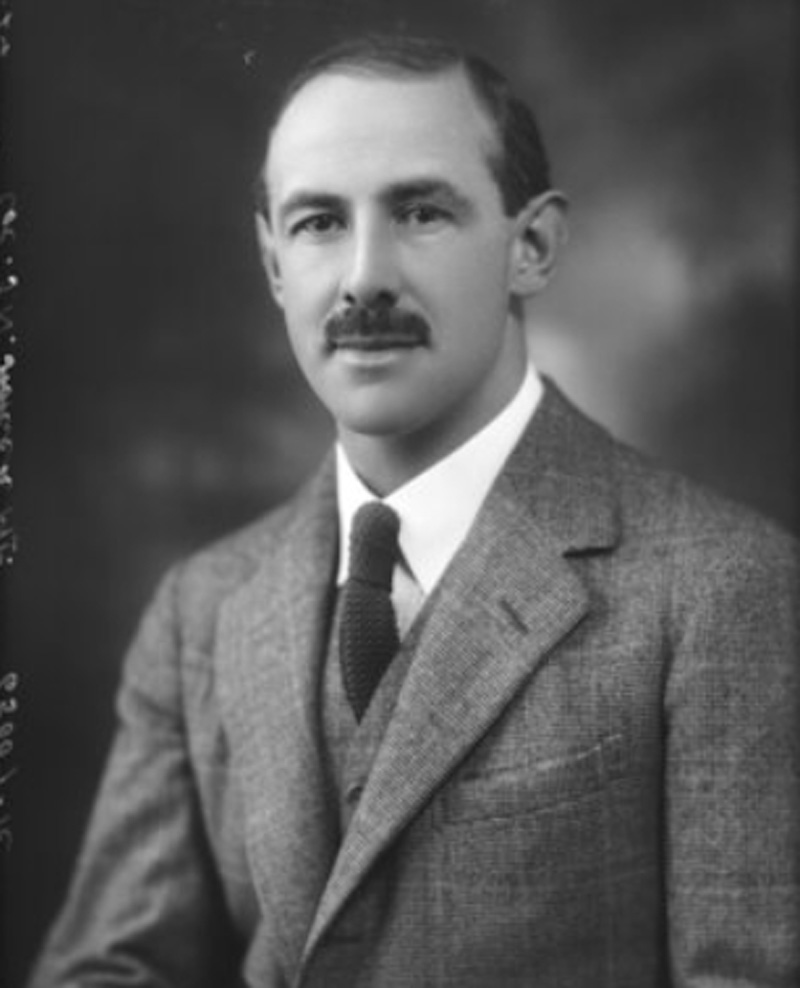
Sir James Nockells Horlick

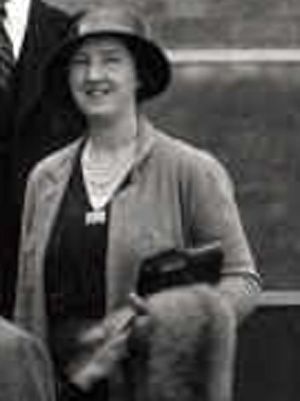
Lady Flora Horlick

By 1920 Colonel Sir James Nockolls Horlick (1886-1972) is shown to be the owner. He changed the name of the property to “Little Paddocks”.

James Nockolls Horlick was born in 1886 in New York City, USA. His father was Sir James Horlick 1st Baronet who established the famous Horlicks malted milk company. He was educated at Eton and Cambridge University where he played first grade cricket and then joined the Coldstream Guards.

In 1911 he married Flora Macdonald Martin, daughter of Colonel Cunliffe Martin. The couple had three children. He served in World War I and was presented with numerous awards including the Military Cross and an O.B.E. After the war he joined the Horlicks Company as a director and commuted between his Sunninghill property and Slough where the Horlicks factory was located at that time. He was the Member of Parliament for Gloucester between 1923 and 1929.

James was a personal friend of members of the Greek Royal family. During the war he met King Alexander who was the first cousin of Prince Philip and his wife Aspasia Manos. Some years after King Alexander died, Aspasia came in 1928 to visit them with her seven-year-old daughter Princess Alexandra. In later years Alexandra wrote her memoirs in which she recalled their visits to the Horlick's Sunninghill house. She said:

“They had a beautiful house “Little Paddocks”, not far from the royal race course and during the royal Ascot season in June they filled their house with dozens of their friends. They held gay house parties of twenty-five to thirty people every weekend too; for at “Little Paddocks” there was every facility to entertain guests. In summer there was the racing and a swimming pool, and there were tennis courts on the beautiful grounds.

I was nearly seven and very bewildered by the size of the huge Ascot house, the butlers, footmen and maids who seemed to be everywhere. I soon came to look on “Little Paddocks” as my home and I loved Uncle Jimmy and Aunt Flora as I called our host and hostess”.

In 1944 Princess Alexandra married King Peter of Yugoslavia. A photo of their wedding with some of the English Royal Family is at this link. The couple had their honeymoon at the Horlicks Sunninghill property in one of the estate cottages. They rented this house for some time after they were married as their country retreat.

Soon after this the Horlick family moved to Achamore House on the Isle of Gigha. The Sunninghill house became the Barclay School for partially sighted girls.

== Location ==
Royal Berkshire is located in Sunninghill, Ascot.
