= Claire Berlinski =

American journalist and author (born 1968)

- Born: 1968 (age 57–58); California, U.S.
- Education: Balliol College, Oxford (DPhil)
- Website: www.berlinski.com

Claire Berlinski (born 1968) is an American journalist and author.

== Personal life ==
Born and raised in California and other parts of the United States, including New York City and Seattle, she read Modern History at Balliol College, Oxford, where she earned a doctorate in International Relations. She has lived in Bangkok, where she worked for Asia Times; Laos, where she worked briefly for the United Nations Development Program; and Istanbul, where she worked as a freelance journalist. She now lives in Paris.

She is the daughter of author and academic David Berlinski and cellist Toby Saks, the granddaughter of composer and musicologist Herman Berlinski, and the sister of writer Mischa Berlinski. She had been living in Istanbul until the height of Gezi Park protests when she decided to move to Paris to be closer to her father after the death of her mother in 2013.

== Career ==
Berlinski has written two spy novels, a work on Europe's importance to American interests, and an admiring but critical biography of Margaret Thatcher.

Her journalism has been published in The New York Times and The Washington Post and many other publications.

== Books ==
Nonfiction

- Menace in Europe: Why the Continent's Crisis Is America's, Too (2006)
- There Is No Alternative: Why Margaret Thatcher Matters (2008)

Fiction

- Alias Selena Keller, co-authored with Steven Barris (2001)
- Loose Lips (2003)
- Lion Eyes (2007)
