= Jane Pilcher =

British sociologist

Jane Pilcher SFHEA is a sociologist specialising in names and naming, gender, and ageing. She is a former associate professor of sociology at Nottingham Trent University, having previously held posts at Cardiff University and the University of Leicester.

== Education ==
Pilcher has a PhD (1992) from Cardiff University; her thesis title was "Social change and feminism: three generations of women, feminist issues and the women's movement".

== Career ==
After research at Cardiff, Pilcher worked at the University of Leicester as a lecturer and later an associate professor. Between 2019 and 2024, she was associate professor of sociology at Nottingham Trent University.

Her 2004 book Fifty key concepts in gender studies, co-authored with Imelda Whelehan (Sage: ISBN 9781412932073) was published in a second edition as Key concepts in gender studies (2016, Sage: ISBN 9781446260289) with the addition of nine further concepts.

Her work has led to several appearances in the media including discussion of children and fashion on BBC Radio 4's Woman's Hour in 2011 and of names on Thinking Allowed in 2016 and Woman's Hour in 2017.

In 2015, she became a Senior Fellow of the Higher Education Academy.

== Selected publications ==
- Pilcher, Jane; Wagg, Stephen, eds. (1996). Thatcher's children?: politics, childhood and society in the 1980s and 1990s. London: Falmer Press. ISBN 9780750704625.
- Pilcher, Jane (1998). Women of their time: generation, gender issues, and feminism. Aldershot: Ashgate. ISBN 9781840141979.
- Pilcher, Jane; Whelehan, Imelda (2016). Key concepts in gender studies (2nd ed.). London: SAGE Publications. ISBN 9781446260289.
- Pole, Christopher; Pilcher, Jane; Williams, John, eds. (2005). Young people in transition: becoming citizens?. New York: Palgrave Macmillan. ISBN 978-1-4039-3368-3.
