= Ansty, Warwickshire =

Village in Warwickshire, England

Coordinates: 52.446°N 1.417°W

Ansty
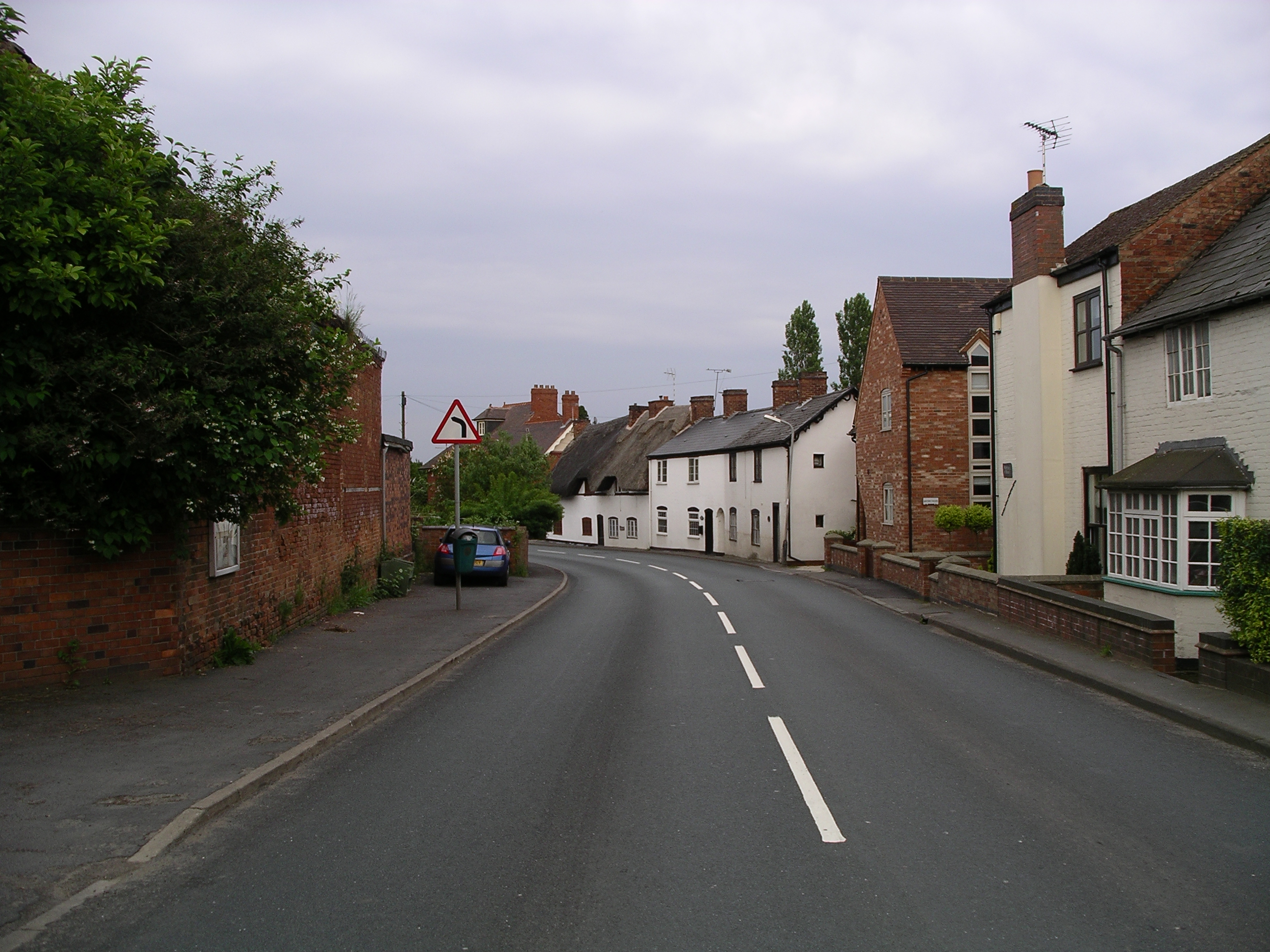
- The main road through Ansty

- Location within Warwickshire
- Population: 299 (2021 Census)
- OS grid reference: SP397833
- Civil parish: Ansty
- District: Rugby
- Shire county: Warwickshire
- Region: West Midlands
- Country: England
- Sovereign state: United Kingdom
- Post town: Coventry
- Postcode district: CV7
- Dialling code: 024
- Police: Warwickshire
- Fire: Warwickshire
- Ambulance: West Midlands
- UK Parliament: Rugby
- Website: Ansty Parish Council

Ansty is a village and civil parish in the Rugby Borough of Warwickshire, England, about 5 miles (8 km) northeast of Coventry city centre and 7 miles (13 km) south of Hinckley. Ansty is on the B4065, which used to be the main road between Coventry and Hinckley. The junction between the M6 and M69 motorways and A46 road is 1 mile (1.6 km) southwest of the village. The parish had a population of 299 at the 2021 Census.

The northern section of the Oxford Canal, once a major coal-carrying network and now a popular leisure resource, passes through the village. Ansty has been cited as "the most boater-hostile village on the canals" because of the huge number of "no mooring" signs.

== History ==
The Domesday Book of 1086 mentions Anestie as part of the hundred of Brinklow. The main landowner was Lady Godiva. Ansty was part of the County of the City of Coventry from 1451 until that county was dissolved in 1842.

The Church of England parish church of Saint James has a 13th-century chancel. The arcade between the nave and north aisle is 14th century. Sir George Gilbert Scott rebuilt the rest of the church in 1856.

Ansty Hall, just outside the village, was built in 1678 for Richard Taylor, who had been on the Parliamentarian side in the English Civil War. The house is arranged in seven bays and built of brick with stone quoins and pediment. It is now the Ansty Hall Hotel.

A cottage industry of weaving developed in the parish from early in the 18th century. This grew into a substantial ribbon-making trade early in the 19th century, but declined in the 1830s.

James Brindley completed the section of the Oxford Canal through Ansty in 1771. In November 1963 a 30 feet (9.1 m) high embankment on the towpath side gave way, spilling 10,000 tons of sand and clay onto adjoining land.

RAF Ansty, a Royal Air Force training base, operated nearby between 1936 and 1953. In the 1940s, 1950s and 1960s, Armstrong Siddeley Motors had its development plant for gas turbines and aircraft rocket motors as well as the Gamma rocket motors used in the Black Knight and Black Arrow launchers. The plant is now the Ansty engineering works of Rolls-Royce. In 2013, Rolls-Royce announced the closure of the military part of the plant. The civil part of the plant remains unaffected.

In 2012, Ansty erected its first War Memorial, a black obelisk, after the hard work of local villagers headed by Chief Petty Officer Dean Bateman.

In 2017 London Electric Vehicle Company (part of the Geely Group) established a major production facility for EV taxis and vans 1.5 miles south of the village at Ansty Park (separated by the M6 motorway).

== Amenities ==
Ansty has a gastropub restaurant, The Rose and Castle just beside the canal and The Ansty Club on Grove Road. There is also The Ansty Golf Club which is open to none members.

== Gallery ==
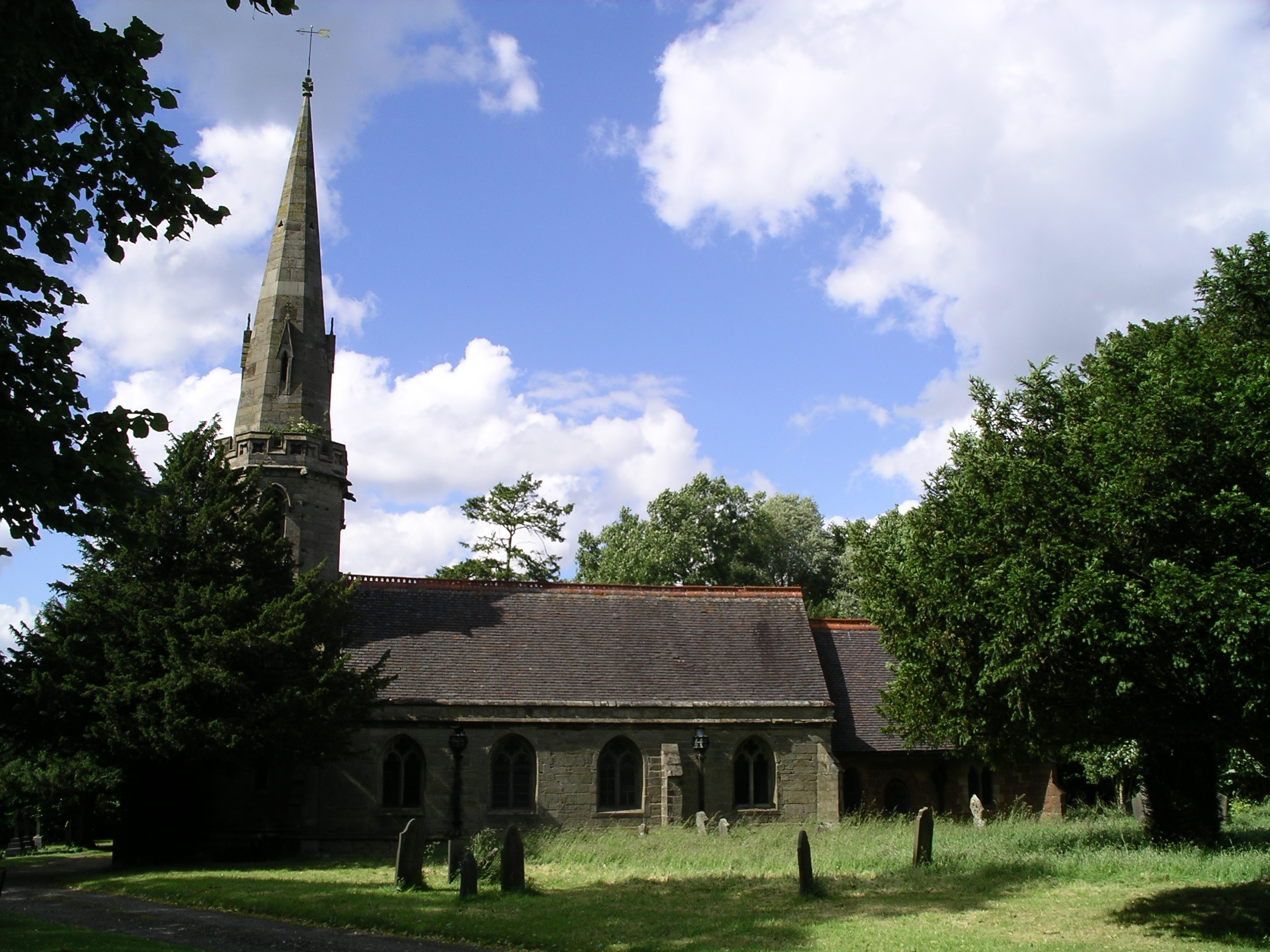
St James' Parish Church

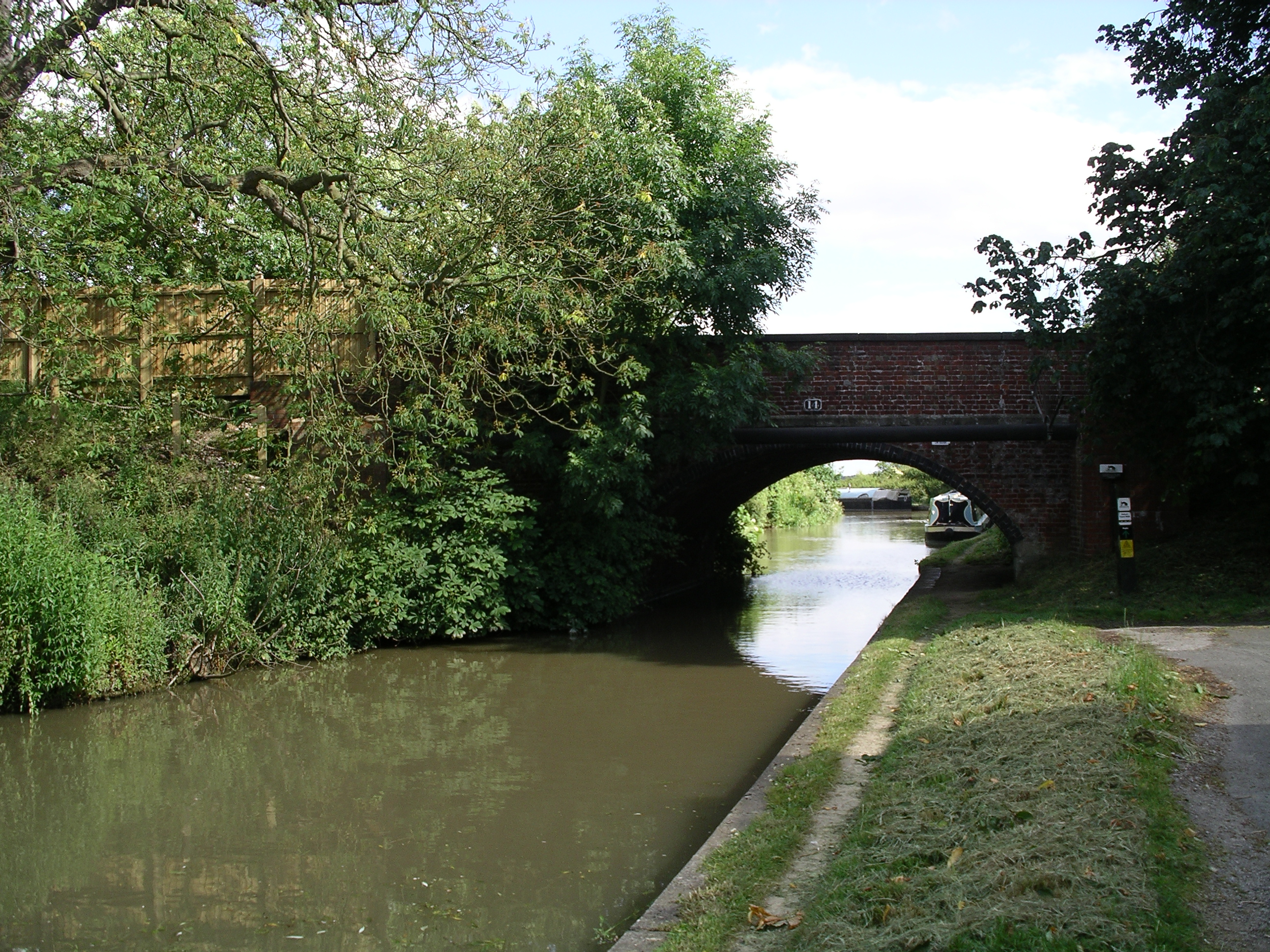
Road bridge over the Oxford Canal

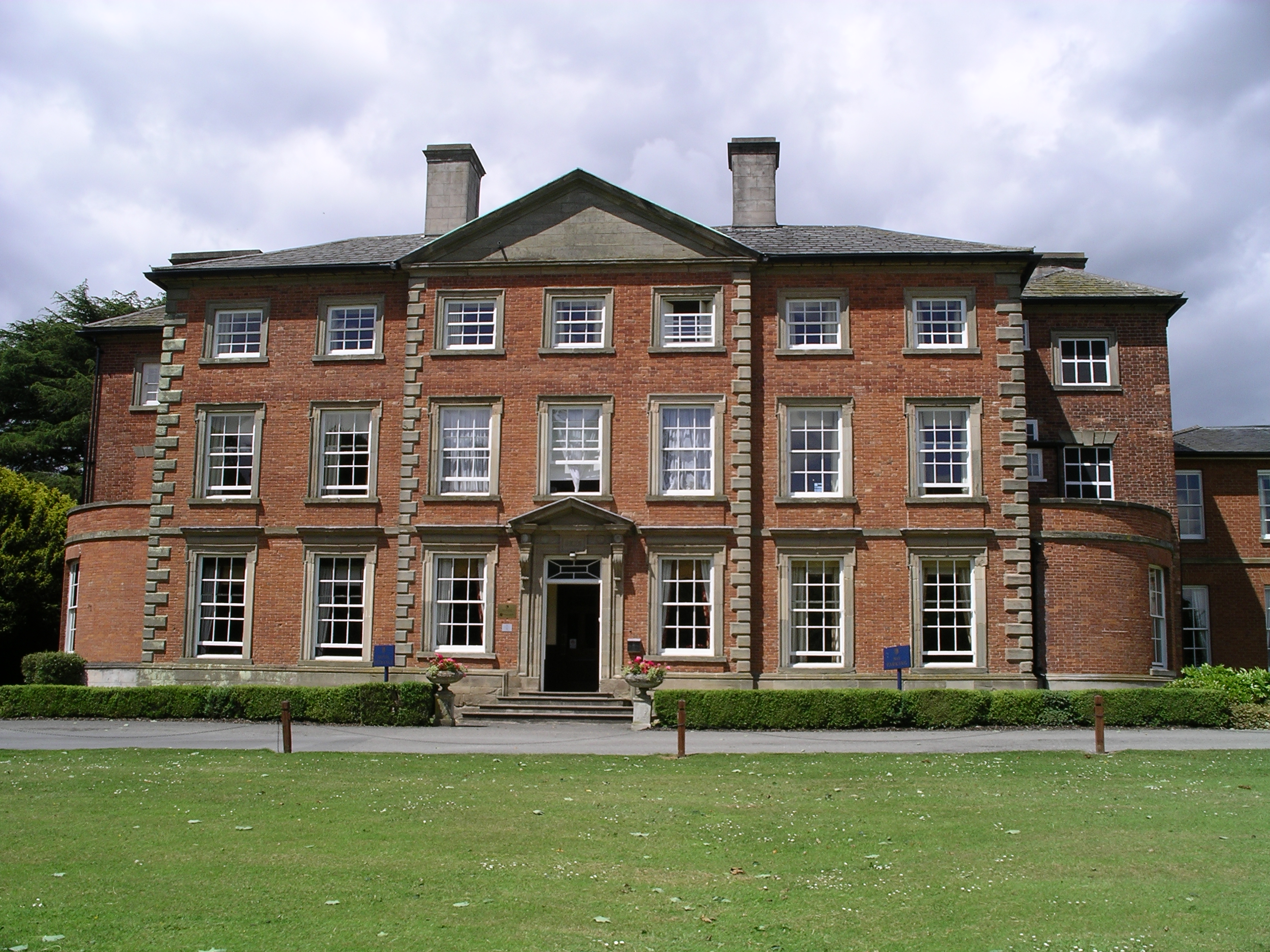
Ansty Hall

== Sources ==
- Allen, Geoff (2000). Warwickshire Towns & Villages. ISBN 1-85058-642-X.
- Compton, Hugh J (1976). The Oxford Canal. Newton Abbot: David & Charles. ISBN 0-7153-7238-6.
- Pevsner, Nikolaus; Wedgwood, Alexandra (1966). The Buildings of England: Warwickshire. Harmondsworth: Penguin Books. p. 67.
- Stephens, W.B. (1969). Victoria County History: A History of the County of Warwick, Volume 8: The City of Coventry and Borough of Warwick. pp. 98–103.
- "Scorpion and Screamer" (PDF). Flight: 76. 13 July 1956.
