= There Is No Alternative: Why Margaret Thatcher Matters =

2008 biography of Margaret Thatcher

- First edition cover
- Author: Claire Berlinski
- Language: English
- Subject: Margaret Thatcher, Politics, Economics, United Kingdom, Europe
- Genre: Nonfiction
- Publisher: Basic Books
- Publication date: 2008-09-29
- Media type: Hardback
- Pages: 400 pages
- ISBN: 0-465-00231-5
- OCLC: 191926111
- Dewey Decimal: 941.085/8092 22
- LC Class: DA589.7 .B47 2008

There Is No Alternative: Why Margaret Thatcher Matters is a 2008 biographical account of the premiership of Margaret Thatcher written by American author Claire Berlinski.

The title is a reference to Margaret Thatcher's fondness for the slogan "There is no alternative" which she used to describe her belief that despite capitalism's problems, "there is no alternative" to it as an economic system, and that economic liberalism must push back against anarchism, communism and socialism. The phrase became something of a rallying cry of arguments in favor of free markets, free trade, and capitalist globalization, with Thatcher and her followers believing that it is the only way which modern societies can advance themselves.

The primary focus of the biography is a favorable account of the Thatcher years, arguing that much like Thatcher's ideology, there was no alternative after the malaise of the 1970s but to embrace a leader like Thatcher. Berlinski argues that much of how the world is currently organized today is as a result of her, and because of this she matters to modern society even today.

== Overview ==
There Is No Alternative is an attempt by the author to explore the rise and success of Prime Minister Margaret Thatcher who Berlinski argues was an important and remarkable leader. It credits Thatcher with the transformation of British society from an empire eternally in decline with a weak economy and an irrelevant political culture to a modern, wealthy, influential nation. The comeback of the United Kingdom mirrors that of Thatcher's own rise from lower-middle class beginnings. Berlinski credits her with being the catalyst for the deconstruction of the post-war socialistic policies of Europe, and the rise of the global free-market revolution.

Berlinski uses archival research, author accounts as a person living through the Thatcher years in the United Kingdom, and a number of interviews to examine Thatcher's rise to power, what drove her crusade against anarchism, communism, socialism and liberalism, the importance of her victories and the costs to the country her transformation caused. Berlinski argues that Thatcher was able to achieve power and influence that no woman before her was able to do, and that she used her femininity for political purposes to help advance her push back against anarchism, communism, socialism and liberalism.

The author claims to be "on her side", yet also examines the negative aspects of Thatcher's reign. The text outlines what Berlinski describes as the failures of monetarism and the bitter social issues her policies helped create in Britain. Yet she argues that despite Thatcher's failures, her significance and impact on British society can not be denied.

Berlinski has said that her goal in writing this biography was to inform, but also entertain the reader. She attempts to give the text a dramatic treatment which will recreate Thatcher's personality and the environment she was surrounded with. She argues that it is not an academic work, but rather a work of popular non-fiction.

== Critical reception ==
In The New York Times Stephen Pollard called it "an immensely frustrating book, the whole being less than the sum of its rather incompatible parts."

Theodore Dalrymple took a favorable view of the biography, writing in The Globe and Mail: "Without being a hagiography, it is about as powerful a defense of Thatcher's record as is likely ever to be written."

In a review on The Scotsman Michael Fry argued that the book is an unremarkable, average account of the Thatcher years, but that it did have some redeeming qualities. He wrote: "Some of the books will be good and some bad. I would say this one comes about halfway in between. Berlinski shows commitment and energy as an author, beside an ability to wheedle great men into telling her things they might not have vouchsafed to anybody else."

Paul Sweeney of The Irish Times stated in his review of the biography that the timing of a positive biography on Margaret Thatcher was quite ironic, saying: "She says Thatcher was enormously significant. She is correct. She says she changed the world. She is correct. But when she says "for the better", she is very wrong." At the same time, Sweeney praises her ability to write, saying, "Yet Berlinski can write and she adopts an interesting style by reproducing interviews with some major players and observers of Thatcher's time. It gives a good insight into the person and her background."

Vincent Carroll wrote in The Wall Street Journal that "Despite Ms. Berlinski's obvious admiration for her subject," the book "is a pleasure to read in part because of its unflinching judgments." He continued, "As an interviewer herself, Ms. Berlinski is subtle and dogged. And while she never interviews Mrs. Thatcher, whose mind has reportedly been clouded by strokes, she does sit down with a number of figures from the Thatcher era -- both loyal insiders and antagonists like former Labour leader Neil Kinnock -- and the exchanges she selects rank among the book's highlights."

Peter Robinson described the book as "splendid" in the National Review, describing it as "a very fine volume--brisk, engrossing, insightful, often charming, and almost always rigorous." In answering the question, "Why Thatcher? Why was it she who understood that something had to be done and then did it? Berlinski proves wonderful here, seeing past all the usual explanations." Berlinski's "single failing," is that "She devotes more than 300 pages to proving that Thatcher remade Britain, and, to a remarkable extent, the world. Then she can't bring herself to admit it."

John R. Coyne Jr. concluded his positive review in the Washington Times by noting of Thatcher that "an attractive, articulate, intelligent and single-minded woman with a political purpose has a natural advantage over her male counterparts, who frequently can be persuaded to behave - or speak - in ways they wouldn't consider when dealing with other men. ... A corollary of this might be that an attractive, articulate, intelligent and single-minded woman with a literary purpose - and a recorder - frequently can persuade old male adversaries of Margaret Thatcher - especially verbose old Laborite Neil Kinnock - to run on in ways they might later regret - but that readers of this fresh, original and extremely well-written book will greatly appreciate."
