= Ansty Hall =

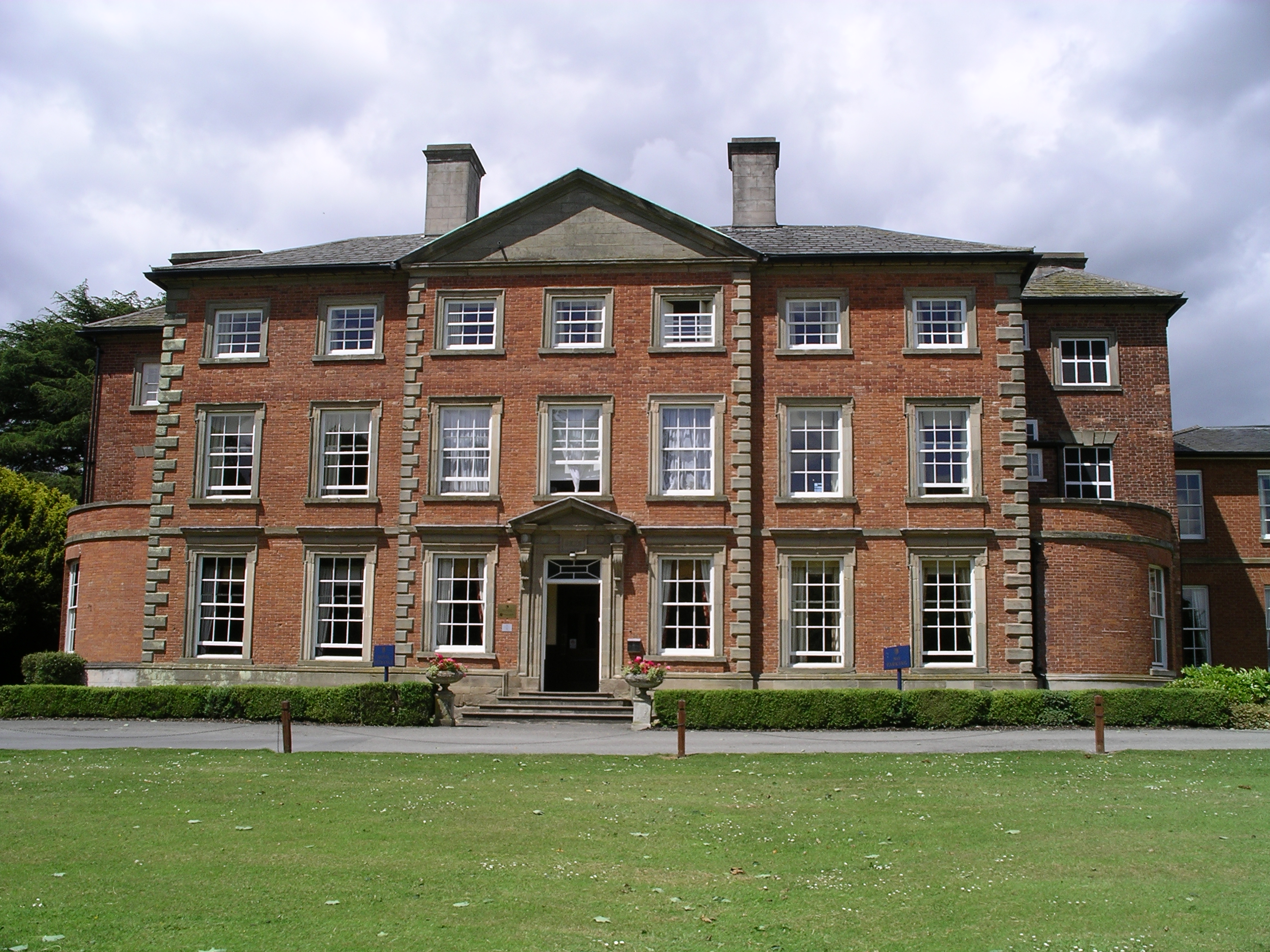
- Interactive map of Ansty Hall
- Type: House
- Location: Ansty
- Coordinates: 52.45°N 1.411°W
- Area: Borough of Rugby
- Built: 1678; 348 years ago
- Governing body: Private
- Owner: Independent (1678-1996); Macdonald Hotels (1996–2023); Exclusive Hotels (2023–present)

Listed Building – Grade II*
- Official name: Ansty Hall
- Designated: 4 December 1951
- Reference no.: 1365084

Ansty Hall is a 17th-century country house, located in the village of Ansty, and near Coventry and Rugby, Warwickshire, which is now a four star hotel operated by Exclusive Hotels. It is a Grade II* listed building surrounded by 8 acres of landscaped gardens.

== History ==
The Manor of Ansty was owned by the Stanhope family from 1406. It was sold in 1506 to the Earl of Shrewsbury who donated it to the Dean of St George's, Windsor. It was let out on lease until 1659 when it was purchased by Richard Tayler.

The old manor was replaced by Edward Tayler in 1678 with a seven-bayed, two-storey mansion. On the death of a later Edward Tayler in 1799, the property passed to his nephew Simon Adams, a barrister and Recorder of Daventry. In 1800 Adams remodeled the house adding a third storey to the main block, with a pediment over the central three bays, and two one-bayed wings, so creating a Carolean style entrance front. Later extensions were added to the south east in the mid- and late 19th century.

Henry Cadwallader Adams (1779-1842) was Mayor of Coventry in 1836 and High Sheriff of Warwickshire in 1837. His nephew and namesake Henry Cadwallader Adams (1817-1899) was a children's writer.

Descendants of the Adams family remained in residence until 1965. More recently the property has been restored and converted for use as a hotel.

It was purchased by Exclusive Hotels in early 2023.

== Notes ==
- Historic England. "Ansty Hall (1365084)". National Heritage List for England. Architectural description of listed building
- A History of the County of Warwick Vol 8 (1969) pp. 43–48 British History Online
