= Statecraft: Strategies for a Changing World =

2002 book by Margaret Thatcher

- First UK edition
- Author: Margaret Thatcher
- Language: English
- Subject: Politics
- Publisher: Harper Perennial
- Publication date: 25 March 2002
- Publication place: United Kingdom
- Pages: 512
- ISBN: 978-0-06-095912-8

Statecraft: Strategies for a Changing World is a book on politics and international relations written by Margaret Thatcher in 2002, and published by Harper Perennial.

== Synopsis ==
Thatcher, looking at the lessons learnt during the Cold War, writes of the United States being the only remaining superpower and the responsibilities that come with that burden.

She also writes about the dangers inherent in the Balkans given the instability of the region and the rise of Islamic extremism.

Contentions made include that there would be no peace in the Middle East until Saddam Hussein was toppled. Her book also said that Israel must trade land for peace, and that the European Union was a "fundamentally unreformable", "classic utopian project, a monument to the vanity of intellectuals, a programme whose inevitable destiny is failure". She argued that Britain should renegotiate its terms of membership or else leave the EU and join the North American Free Trade Area. The book also reveals that Thatcher had changed her views on climate change from her 1989 UN General Assembly address.

The book is dedicated to former US President Ronald Reagan.

== Reception ==
Bill Emmott, writing in the Los Angeles Times, said, "Europeans, Asians, Latin Americans (except Pinochet) and Africans simply don't have a chance in Thatcher's eyes. They do not trace back their political and legal values to Magna Carta. They are all, in her eyes, collectivists rather than freedom-loving individuals. It is all the more surprising therefore that having supported British membership of the European Economic Community during the 1970s and having helped to deepen that market during her time as prime minister, she now thinks Britain ought to leave that ghastly grouping, run as it is by bureaucrats and foreigners. To be critical of European countries and of the European institutions is fine: There is plenty to criticise and to change. But in this book Thatcher goes beyond that, arguing in essence that Europe is always to be distrusted because it is full of Europeans and in her lifetime Europeans have always caused trouble."

Francis Maude, writing for the New Statesman, said, "Thatcher's latest and, she says, last book is not really what it says. Its title suggests a manual for practitioners of statecraft, a sort of Machiavelli's The Prince for our times. Such practitioners will find Statecraft well worth reading, as will all those with an interest in international affairs, because this is an account of Thatcher's views about the world, its recent histories and what should be done. It is broad in scope, detailed in analysis and, as you would expect, forthright in prescription. And prescription is in plentiful supply."

Michael Collins has written in Contemporary Review, "Statecraft is aimed as much at decision-makers in the US as at a domestic readership. In fact fewer than a fifth of the book's magisterial and incisive survey of current world affairs is concerned with the European Union. Most of it is composed of observations derived from meetings with world leaders and briefings from well-placed sources. Lady Thatcher takes a typically no-nonsense approach to the realities of power politics and warns that battlefield nuclear weapons will be used in the foreseeable future. Yet 'since the end of the Cold War' she argues, 'the West has let down its guard'. Two powers came out big winners at the end of the Cold War: the United States and China."
