= John Campbell (biographer) =

British political writer and biographer

John Campbell (born 1947) is a British political writer and biographer. He has 10 grandchildren and 2 biological children and 2 step children. He was educated at Charterhouse and the University of Edinburgh from where he gained a Ph.D. in politics in 1975.

His works include biographies of Lloyd George, F. E. Smith, Aneurin Bevan, Roy Jenkins, Edward Heath, and Margaret Thatcher, the last consisting of two volumes, The Grocer's Daughter (2000) and The Iron Lady (2003). A one-volume abridgment prepared by David Freeman (a historian of Britain teaching at California State University, Fullerton), entitled The Iron Lady: Margaret Thatcher, From Grocer's Daughter to Prime Minister, was published in 2009 and reissued in paperback in 2011. He was awarded the NCR Book Award for his biography of Heath in 1994.

He has also written, If Love Were All ... the story of Frances Stevenson & David Lloyd George (2006) and Pistols At Dawn: Two Hundred Years of Political Rivalry from Pitt & Fox to Blair & Brown (2009).

His most recent book is the official biography, Roy Jenkins: A Well Rounded Life (Jonathan Cape, March 2014), which was short-listed for the 2014 Samuel Johnson Prize and the 2014 Costa Biography Award, and won the Biography category in the 2014 Political Book Awards.

Campbell was consultant to the 2009 production of Margaret, a fictionalisation of Margaret Thatcher's fall from power, and the 2012 film The Iron Lady.

== Publications ==
- Lloyd George: The Goat in the Wilderness, 1922-31 (1977)
- F. E. Smith, 1st Earl of Birkenhead (1983)
- Roy Jenkins: A Biography (1983)
- Nye Bevan and the Mirage of British Socialism (1987)
- The Experience of World War 2 (editor, 1989)
- Edward Heath: A Biography (1993)
- Margaret Thatcher: The Grocer's Daughter (2000)
- Margaret Thatcher: The Iron Lady (2003)
- If Love Were All: The Story of Frances Stevenson and David Lloyd George (2006)
- The Iron Lady: Margaret Thatcher, from Grocer's Daughter to Prime Minister (2009; paperback, 2011; ISBN 978-0-14-312087-2)
- Pistols at Dawn: Two Hundred Years of Political Rivalry from Pitt and Fox to Blair and Brown (2009)
- Roy Jenkins: A Well Rounded Life (2014)
