= Thatcher baronets =

Baronetcy in the Baronetage of the United Kingdom

- Creation date: 7 December 1990
- Created by: Elizabeth II
- Baronetage: Baronetage of the United Kingdom
- First holder: Sir Denis Thatcher
- Present holder: The Hon. Sir Mark Thatcher
- Heir apparent: Michael Thatcher
- Remainder to: heirs male (of the body of the grantee)

The Thatcher baronetcy, of Scotney in the County of Kent, is a baronetcy created for the husband of Prime Minister Margaret Thatcher, Denis Thatcher, on 7 December 1990, following the resignation as Prime Minister of his wife on 28 November. The current holder is Mark Thatcher, who succeeded his father in 2003.

It is the only baronetcy to have been granted since 1964, and is one of only three extant hereditary titles awarded outside the British royal family after 1965.

== History ==
The baronetcy was created by the Queen on the recommendation of Prime Minister John Major for Denis Thatcher, following the resignation of his wife Margaret Thatcher in November 1990. The Speaker of the House of Commons was pressed to allow a debate relating to the revival of hereditary titles, but referred MPs to Erskine May: Parliamentary Practice and in particular to the guidance that "It has been ruled that the Prime Minister cannot be interrogated as to the advice that he may have given to the sovereign with regard to the grant of honours". Major told the Commons Public Administration Committee in May 2004 that he had been lobbied by "influential figures" in the Conservative Party to make the recommendation, against his personal preference. Margaret Thatcher was granted the Order of Merit at the same time, and was made a life peer after she stood down as an MP in 1992. Later in 1992, Sir Denis Thatcher petitioned for and obtained a grant of arms from the College of Arms for himself and his successors in the baronetcy; at the same time, Baroness Thatcher also received a grant of arms.

Mark Thatcher succeeded to the baronetcy in 2003. Following his conviction for his part in the 2004 Equatorial Guinea coup attempt there were calls from some MPs for him to be stripped of the title, but Thatcher ultimately retained it.

== Thatcher baronets, of Scotney (1990) ==
Sir Denis Thatcher, Bt (1990–2003)

- Sir Denis Thatcher, 1st Baronet MBE TD CStJ (1915–2003)
- The Honourable Sir Mark Thatcher, 2nd Baronet (born 1953)

== Line of succession ==
Sir Denis Thatcher, 1st Baronet (1915–2003)
  - The Honourable Sir Mark Thatcher, 2nd Baronet (b. 1953)
    - (1) Michael Thatcher (b. 3 March 1989)

== Coats of arms ==
Sir Denis Thatcher, Bt & Sir Mark Thatcher, Bt's coat of arms

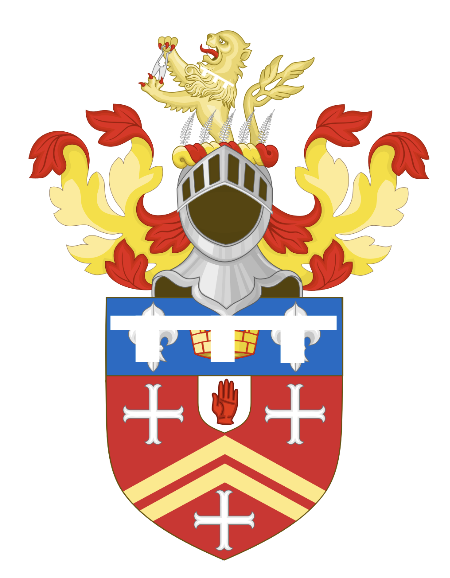
Arms of Sir Mark Thatcher, Bt's heir apparent Michael Thatcher

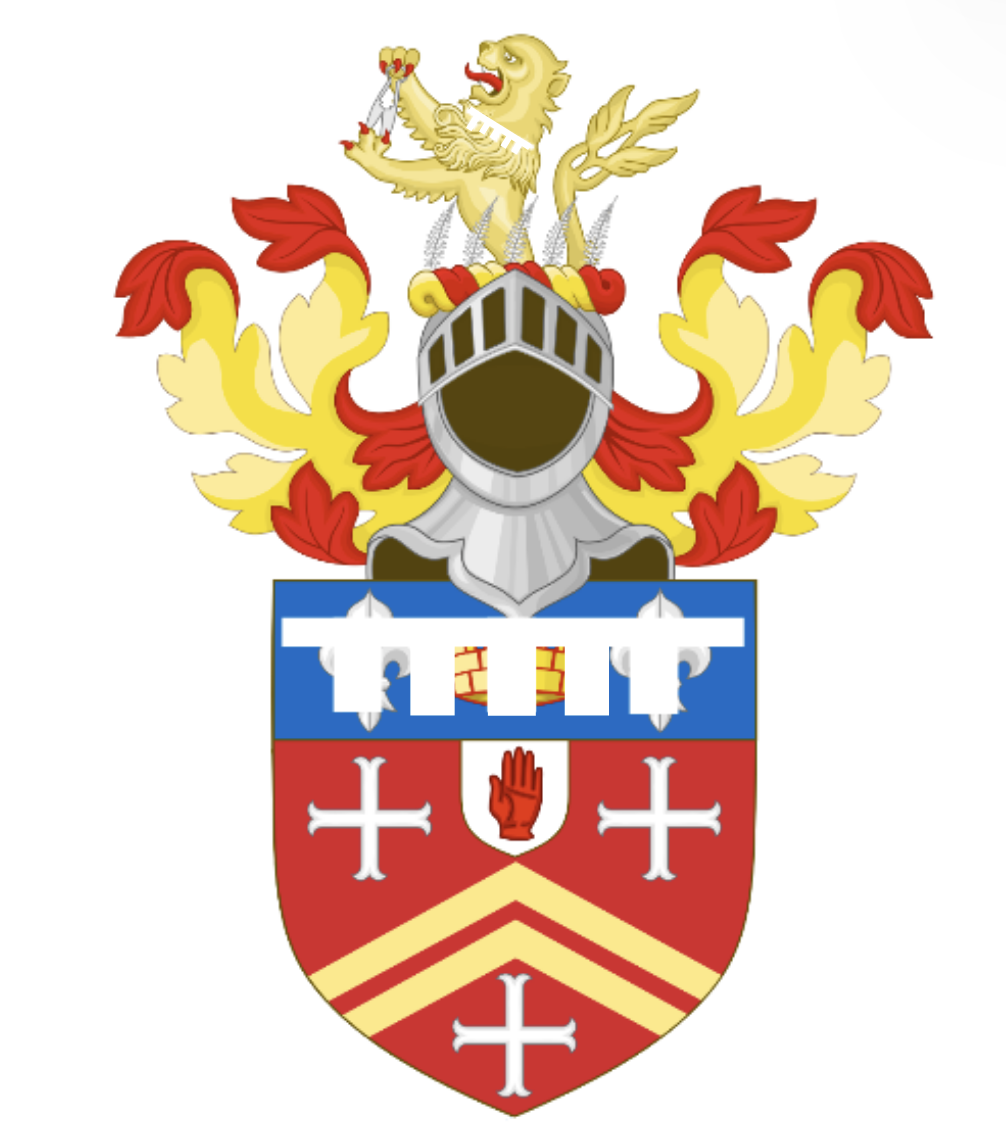
Arms of Sir Mark Thatcher, Bt's heir apparent Michael Thatcher's heir apparent Emery Monroe Thatcher

The arms (escutcheon variant) of the first baronet's wife and the second baronet's mother, Margaret Thatcher, Baroness Thatcher,

Baronetage of the United Kingdom
Preceded by Pearson baronets	Thatcher baronets of Scotney; 7 December 1990	Succeeded by no subsequent creation
