= Rotten and pocket boroughs =

Former type of parliamentary borough or constituency in England

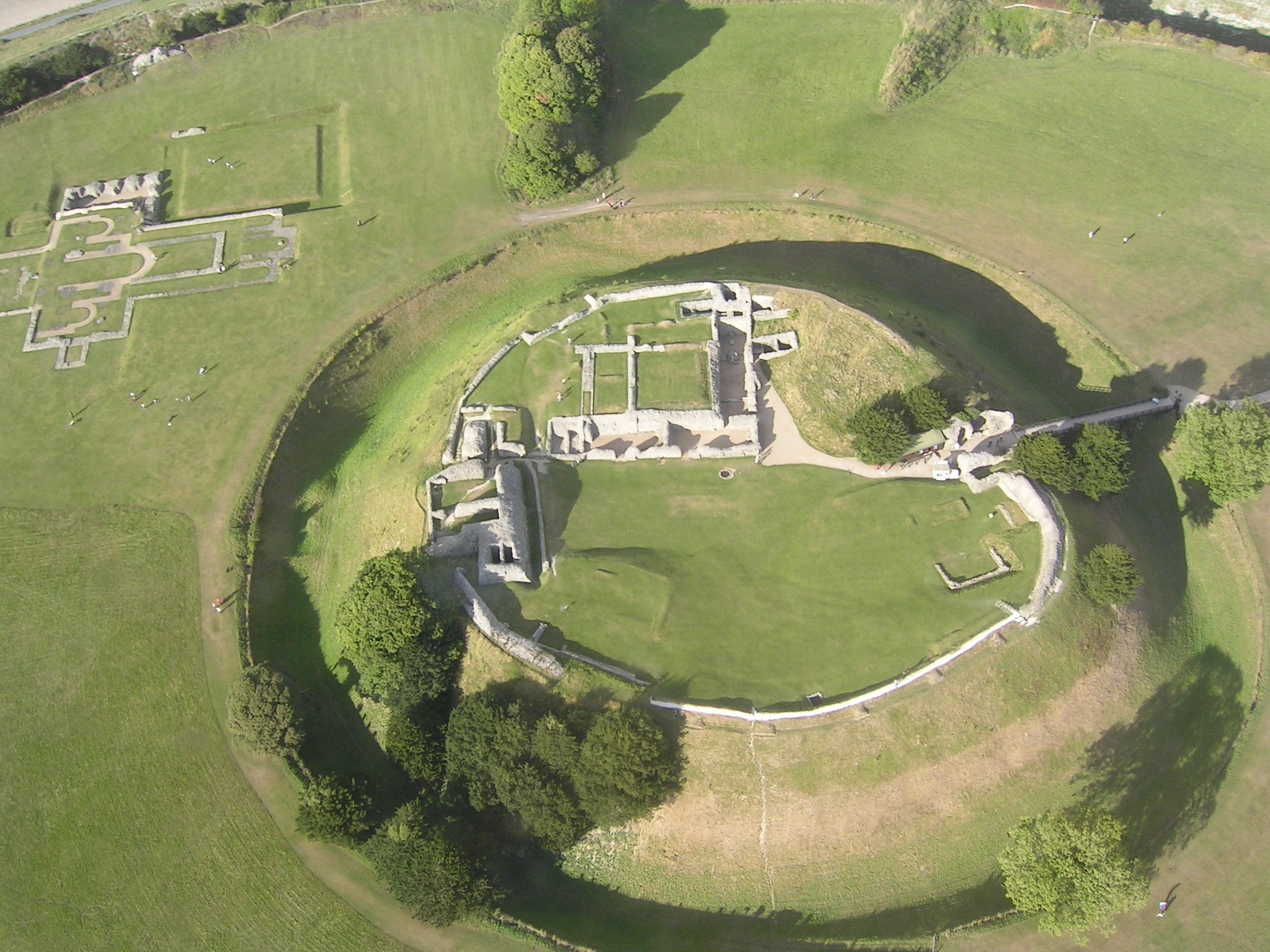
Old Sarum in Wiltshire, abandoned since the 13th century, continued to elect two Members of Parliament until 1832.

A rotten or pocket borough, also known as a nomination borough or proprietorial borough, was a parliamentary borough or constituency in England, Great Britain, or the United Kingdom that had very few voters. They could be used by a patron (or local landlord) to gain disproportionate influence within the House of Commons. The Reform Act of 1832 abolished most of the rotten and pocket boroughs in existence previously.

The same terms were used for similar boroughs represented in the 18th-century Parliament of Ireland.

== Background ==
A parliamentary borough was a town or former town whose status could be created through a royal charter, giving it the right to return representatives (burgesses) to the House of Commons. It was not unusual for the physical boundary of the settlement to change as the town developed or contracted, so that the boundaries of the parliamentary borough and of the physical settlement were no longer the same.

For centuries, parliamentary representation and the right to vote in elections to the House of Commons remained largely unchanged from medieval times, even as population and economic activity shifted, contributing to an unequal distribution of seats by the early 19th century. In some constituencies the electorate was so small that seats could be controlled through patronage, bribery or coercion and many seats were treated almost as "property" under longstanding family influence. Early 19th-century reformers used the term rotten borough for depopulated constituencies that retained representation, and pocket borough for constituencies "in the pocket" of a patron who could dominate the outcome.

Voting was public rather than by ballot; at the hustings the returning officer held a nomination meeting and might call for a show of hands, while in a contested election the formal poll could last several days; votes were given orally and recorded, which helped enable intimidation as well as bribery. Uncontested elections were common, and in some seats no poll took place for many years. An MP might be elected by only a few voters, while at the same time many rapidly growing towns were inadequately represented in Parliament. Before 1832, the industrial town of Manchester expanded rapidly during the Industrial Revolution, yet it had no MPs; reform-era accounts note that the citizens of fast-growing cities such as Manchester could vote only as part of large county constituencies (in Manchester's case, Lancashire) that returned only two MPs. Manchester was enfranchised as a separate parliamentary constituency in 1832, initially returning two MPs. Many of these ancient boroughs elected two MPs. By the time of the 1831 general election, out of 406 elected members, 152 were chosen by fewer than 100 voters each and 88 by fewer than fifty voters.

By the early 19th century, moves were made towards parliamentary reform, with the Representation of the People Act 1832 (the "Great Reform Act") disenfranchising many small boroughs and creating new constituencies, redistributing seats in the House of Commons. The Ballot Act 1872 introduced the secret ballot, allowing voters to vote in private and making it harder to intimidate voters or to verify bribery. Further reforms followed in the 1880s: the Corrupt and Illegal Practices Prevention Act 1883 increased penalties for corrupt practices including bribery and "treating" (the provision of food and drink), and it also placed limits on election expenses; accounts from the period note that election expenditure fell significantly under these rules.

== Rotten boroughs ==
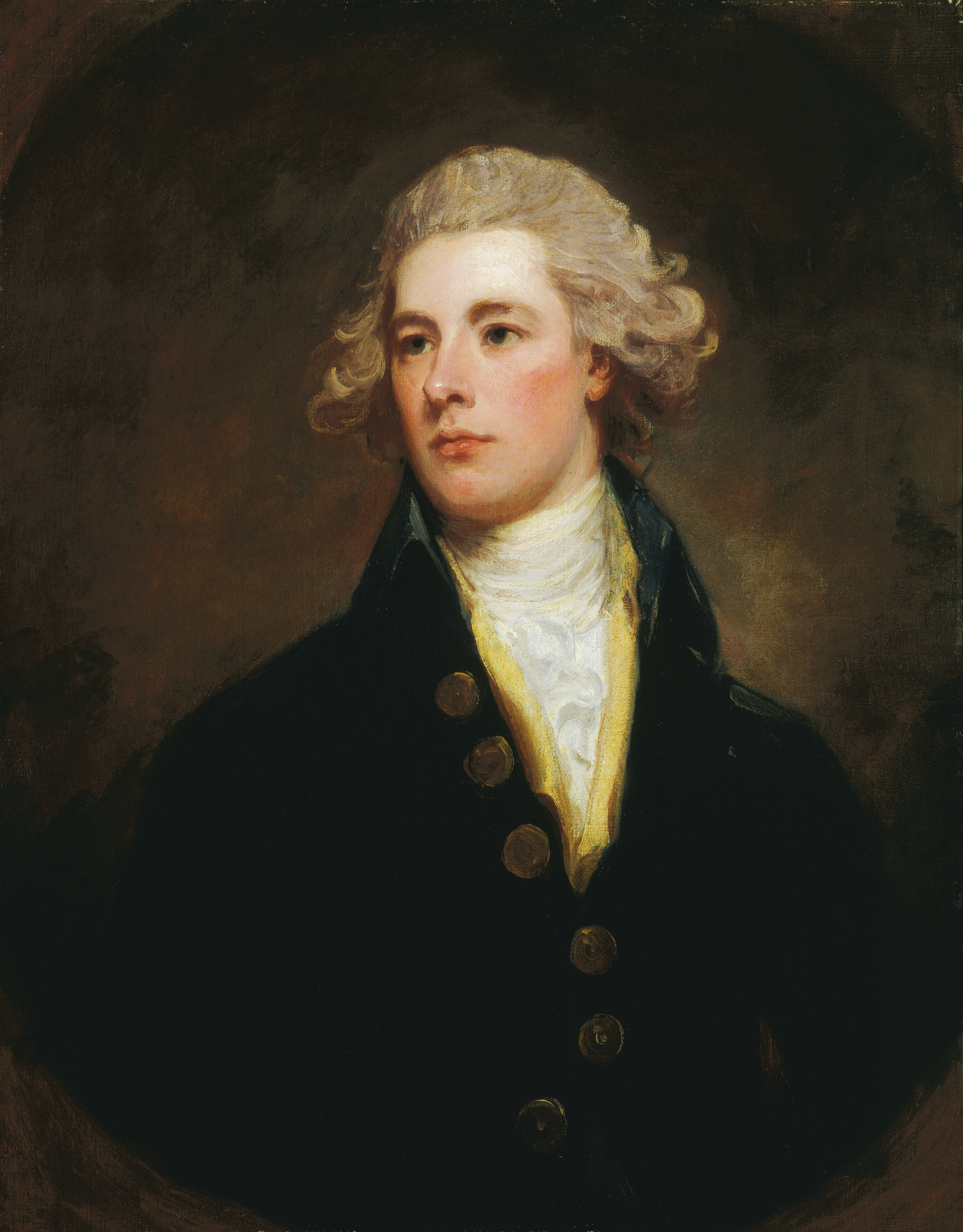
William Pitt the Younger in 1783, by George Romney

The expression rotten borough is attested from the mid-18th century (with dictionary evidence from 1765), and was popularised by early 19th-century parliamentary reformers as a pejorative label for depopulated constituencies that retained representation. In practice, many such seats had very small electorates and could be maintained by the Crown or controlled by aristocratic patrons, making them vulnerable to bribery, coercion, and other forms of influence. The adjective rotten carried a strongly negative sense, implying both decay and moral wrongdoing.

Before the Ballot Act 1872 introduced secret voting, parliamentary elections were conducted publicly, and electors declared their votes openly, which facilitated intimidation by employers and landlords and made it easier to verify the results of bribery. In constituencies dominated by a patron, MPs were often expected to serve that interest rather than the broader body of electors.

Typically, rotten boroughs were places that had once been larger or more significant but later declined, sometimes dramatically, while still retaining the right to return MPs. Old Sarum is a well-known example. English Heritage describes it as a major centre of secular and ecclesiastical government for about 150 years, but notes that the cathedral was moved to nearby Salisbury in 1226 and that Old Sarum nonetheless continued as a 'rotten borough' electing MPs until 1832.

A Historic England listing similarly records that the site was totally abandoned by 1514 but continued as a rotten borough sending MPs to Westminster until it was disenfranchised by the Reform Act 1832. Contemporary accounts of the move emphasise the development of the new city around the cathedral: Salisbury Cathedral's official history states that a new site in the river valley was chosen, work began in 1220, and "the City of Salisbury ... grew under the direction of Bishop Poore", with a large workforce involved in building the cathedral and associated settlement. English Heritage's teachers' materials add that by 1226 most of the clergy had left Old Sarum and by 1240 the majority of the local population had moved to Salisbury (New Sarum). Despite the loss of population, Old Sarum retained the right to elect two MPs; English Heritage notes that its MPs could effectively be nominated by a single influential landowner, making it a classic "pocket borough". For example, the UK Government History blog notes that William Pitt (the Elder) entered Parliament as member for "the Pitt family's pocket borough of Old Sarum".

Many rotten and pocket boroughs were controlled by aristocratic patrons, including landowners and peers, who could place their own (often non-resident) followers in parliamentary seats, sometimes effectively choosing members for both seats. In such constituencies representatives were often expected to please their patrons rather than their constituents. This influence could rest on property rights: in some boroughs the vote was attached to burgage property, and wealthy individuals could buy up the burgages (or acquire burgage tenures) to control the election outcome. Scholarship has also noted that "patronal peers" could thereby control large blocs of seats in the House of Commons. Because electorates could be extremely small, rotten boroughs returned MPs in ways that were easy to influence or control; despite having very few voters, many still returned two MPs for much of their existence. Contemporary critics even alleged that seats in such boroughs could be bought and sold "in the market".

Examples of rotten boroughs
Borough	County	Houses	Voters	Notes
Old Sarum	Wiltshire	3	7	
Gatton	Surrey	23	7	
Newtown	Isle of Wight	14	23	
East Looe	Cornwall	167	38	
Dunwich	Suffolk	44	32	Most of this formerly prosperous town had fallen into the sea
Plympton Erle	Devon	182	40	One seat was controlled from the mid-17th century to 1832 by the Treby family of Plympton House
Bramber	West Sussex	35	20	
Winchelsea	East Sussex	34	12	This once important Cinque Port had silted up and decayed
Callington	Cornwall	225	42	Controlled by the Rolle family of Heanton Satchville and Stevenstone in Devon
Trim	County Meath			Parliament of Ireland

== Pocket boroughs ==
Pocket boroughs were boroughs which could effectively be controlled by a single person who owned at least half of the "burgage tenements", the occupants of which had the right to vote in the borough's parliamentary elections. A wealthy patron therefore had merely to buy up these specially qualified houses and install in them his own tenants, selected for their willingness to do their landlord's bidding, or given such precarious forms of tenure that they dared not displease him. As there was no secret ballot until 1872, the landowner could evict electors who did not vote for the two men he wanted. A common expression referring to such a situation was that "Mr A had been elected on Lord B's interest".

Some rich individuals controlled several boroughs; for example, the Duke of Newcastle is said to have had seven boroughs "in his pocket". One of the representatives of a pocket borough was often the man who controlled it, and for this reason they were also referred to as proprietorial boroughs.

Pocket boroughs were seen by their 19th-century owners as a valuable method of ensuring the representation of the landed interest in the House of Commons.

Significantly diminished by the Reform Act 1832, pocket boroughs were for all practical purposes abolished by the Reform Act 1867. This considerably extended the borough franchise and established the principle that each parliamentary constituency should hold roughly the same number of electors. Boundary commissions were set up by subsequent Acts of Parliament to maintain this principle as population movements continued.

=== Government controlled boroughs ===
There were also boroughs which were controlled not by a particular patron but rather by the Crown, specifically by the departments of state of the Treasury or Admiralty, and which thus returned the candidates nominated by the ministers in charge of those departments.

In many cases, placemen under William III exercised their control over Parliament simply by showing up. Attendance at legislative sessions during William's reign was generally low, so a bloc determined to vote could pass its favoured measures by default.

== Reform ==
In the late 18th century, many political societies, such as the London Corresponding Society and the Society of the Friends of the People, called for parliamentary reform. Specifically, they thought that the rotten borough system was unfair and they called for a more equal distribution of representatives that reflected the population of Britain. However, legislation enacted by William Pitt the Younger caused these societies to disband by making it illegal for them to meet or publish information.

In the 19th century, there were moves toward reform, which broadly meant ending the over-representation of boroughs with few electors. The culmination of the process of Catholic emancipation in 1829 finally brought the reform issue to a head. The reform movement had a major success in the Reform Act 1832, which disfranchised the 56 boroughs listed below, most of them in the south and west of England. This redistributed representation in Parliament to new major population centres and places with significant industries, which tended to be farther north.

Buckinghamshire

- Wendover
- Amersham

Cornwall

- Bossiney
- Callington
- Camelford
- East Looe
- Fowey
- Lostwithiel
- Mitchell or St Michael's
- Newport
- Saltash
- St Germans
- St Mawes
- Tregony
- West Looe

Devon

- Beeralston
- Okehampton
- Plympton Erle

Hampshire

- Newtown, Isle of Wight
- Stockbridge
- Whitchurch
- Yarmouth, Isle of Wight

Kent

- New Romney
- Queenborough

Northamptonshire

- Brackley
- Higham Ferrers

Suffolk

- Aldeburgh
- Dunwich
- Orford

Somerset

- Ilchester
- Milborne Port
- Minehead

Surrey

- Bletchingley
- Gatton
- Haslemere

Sussex

- Bramber
- East Grinstead
- Seaford
- Steyning
- Winchelsea

Wiltshire

- Downton
- Great Bedwyn
- Heytesbury
- Hindon
- Ludgershall
- Old Sarum
- Wootton Bassett

Yorkshire

- Aldborough, West Riding
- Boroughbridge, North Riding
- Hedon, East Riding

Other counties

- Appleby, Westmorland
- Bishop's Castle, Shropshire
- Castle Rising, Norfolk
- Corfe Castle, Dorset
- Newton, Lancashire
- Weobley, Herefordshire

== Contemporary defences ==
A substantial number of Tory constituencies were rotten and pocket boroughs, and their right to representation was defended by the successive Tory governments in office between 1807 and 1830. During this period they came under criticism from figures such as Thomas Paine and William Cobbett.

It was argued in defence of such boroughs that they provided stability and were also a means for promising young politicians to enter Parliament, with William Pitt the Elder being cited as a key example. Some MPs claimed that the boroughs should be retained, as Britain had enjoyed periods of prosperity while they were part of the constitution of Parliament.

Because British colonists in the West Indies and British North America, and those in the Indian subcontinent, had no representation of their own at Westminster, representatives of these groups often claimed that rotten boroughs provided opportunities for virtual representation in Parliament for colonial interest groups.

The Tory politician Spencer Perceval asked the nation to look at the system as a whole, saying that if pocket boroughs were disenfranchised, the whole system was liable to collapse.

== Later usage ==
The magazine Private Eye has a column entitled "Rotten Boroughs", which lists stories of municipal wrongdoing. In this instance, "boroughs" refers to local government districts rather than parliamentary constituencies.

In his book The Age of Consent (2003), George Monbiot compared small island states with one vote in the United Nations General Assembly to "rotten boroughs".

The term "rotten borough" is sometimes used to disparage electorates used to gain political leverage. In Hong Kong and Macau, functional constituencies (with small voter bases attached to special interests) are often referred to as "rotten boroughs" by long-time columnist Jake van der Kamp. In New Zealand, the term has been used to refer to electorates which, by dint of an agreement for a larger party, have been won by a minor party, enabling that party to gain more seats under the country's proportional representation system. The Spectator has described the London Borough of Tower Hamlets as a "rotten borough", and in 2015 The Independent reported that Tower Hamlets was to be the subject of an investigation into electoral fraud.

The Electoral Reform Society produced a list of "Rotten Boroughs" for the 2019 United Kingdom local elections, with Fenland District Council at the top.

The Corporation of the City of London has been referred to as the UK's Last Rotten Borough due to the fact that only four of its 25 electoral wards hold elections where voting by residents decides the result. The other wards are decided on votes cast by business leaders, not residents, making this the only local government authority in the UK that now lacks a popular franchise.

== In popular culture ==
=== Literature ===
- In the satirical novel Melincourt, or Sir Oran Haut-Ton (1817) by Thomas Love Peacock, an orang-utan named Sir Oran Haut-Ton is elected to parliament by the "ancient and honourable borough of Onevote". The election of Sir Oran forms part of the hero's plan to persuade civilisation to share his belief that orang-utans are a race of human beings who merely lack the power of speech. "The borough of Onevote stood in the middle of a heath, and consisted of a solitary farm, of which the land was so poor and intractable, that it would not have been worth the while of any human being to cultivate it, had not the Duke of Rottenburgh found it very well worth his while to pay his tenant for living there, to keep the honourable borough in existence." The single voter of the borough, Mr Christopher Corporate, elects two MPs, each of whom "can only be considered as the representative of half of him".
- In the parliamentary novels of Anthony Trollope pocket boroughs are a recurring theme. John Grey, Phineas Finn, and Lord Silverbridge are all elected by pocket boroughs.
- In Chapter 7 of the novel Vanity Fair (published 1847–1848), author William Makepeace Thackeray introduces the fictitious borough of "Queen's Crawley", so named in honour of a stopover in the small Hampshire town of Crawley by Queen Elizabeth I, who, delighted by the quality of the local beer, instantly raised the small town of Crawley into a borough, giving it two members in Parliament. At the time of the story, set in the early 19th century, the place had lost population, so that it was "come down to that condition of borough which used to be denominated rotten". Queen's Crawley re-appears in Thackeray's The Virginians (published in 1857–1859).
- In Charles Dickens' novel Our Mutual Friend (1864–1865), a borough called "Pocket-Breaches" elects Mr. Veneering as its MP.
- The novel Rotten Borough was a controversial story published by Oliver Anderson under the pen name Julian Pine in 1937, republished in 1989.
- In Diana Wynne Jones' 2003 book The Merlin Conspiracy, Old Sarum features as a character, with one line being "I'm a rotten borough, I am."
- In the Aubrey–Maturin series of sea-faring tales, the pocket borough of Milport (also known as Milford) is initially held by General Aubrey, the father of protagonist Jack Aubrey. In the twelfth novel in the series, The Letter of Marque (1988), Jack's father dies and the seat is offered to Jack himself by his cousin Edward Norton, the "owner" of the borough. The borough has just seventeen electors, all of whom are tenants of Mr Norton.
- In the 1969 first novel of George MacDonald Fraser's The Flashman Papers series, the eponymous antihero, Harry Flashman, mentions that his father, Buckley Flashman, had been in Parliament, but "they did for him at Reform" – implying that the elder Flashman had sat for a rotten or pocket borough.

=== Television ===
- In the episode "Dish and Dishonesty" of the BBC television comedy Blackadder the Third, Edmund Blackadder attempts to bolster support for the Prince Regent in Parliament by getting the incompetent Baldrick elected to the fictional rotten borough of Dunny-on-the-Wold (presumably a reference to Dunwich, with 'dunny' also being a slang term meaning 'toilet' in Australian English or 'idiot' in an obsolete British English dialect). He easily accomplished this with a result of 16,472 to nil, even though the constituency had only one voter (Blackadder himself).

=== Video games ===
- The video game Assassin's Creed III briefly mentions pocket and rotten boroughs in a database entry entitled "Pocket Boroughs", with Old Sarum identified as one of the worst examples of a pocket borough. In the game, shortly before the Boston Massacre, a non-player character (NPC) can be heard speaking to a group of people on the colonies' lack of representation in Parliament and listing several rotten boroughs, including Old Sarum.

=== Quotations ===
- "[Borough representation is] the rotten part of the constitution." – William Pitt the Elder
- Thomas Paine, Rights of Man, 1791:
  The county of Yorkshire, which contains near a million souls, sends two county members; and so does the county of Rutland which contains not a hundredth part of that number. The town of Old Sarum, which contains not three houses, sends two members; and the town of Manchester, which contains upwards of sixty thousand souls, is not admitted to send any. Is there any principle in these things?
- Gilbert and Sullivan, HMS Pinafore:
  Sir Joseph Porter:
  I grew so rich that I was sent
  By a pocket borough into Parliament.
  I always voted at my party's call,
  And I never thought of thinking for myself at all.
  Chorus:
  And he never thought of thinking for himself at all.
  Sir Joseph:
  I thought so little, they rewarded me
  By making me the Ruler of the Queen's Navee!
- From Iolanthe by Gilbert and Sullivan:
  Fairy Queen: Let me see. I've a borough or two at my disposal. Would you like to go into Parliament?
- Patrick O'Brian, The Letter of Marque:
  "Could you not spend an afternoon at Milport, to meet the electors? There are not many of them, and those few are all my tenants, so it is no more than a formality; but there is a certain decency to be kept up. The writ will be issued very soon."
- The Borough of Queen's Crawley in Thackeray's Vanity Fair is a rotten borough eliminated by the Reform Act 1832:
  When Colonel Dobbin quitted the service, which he did immediately after his marriage, he rented a pretty country place in Hampshire, not far from Queen's Crawley, where, after the passing of the Reform Bill, Sir Pitt and his family constantly resided now. All idea of a peerage was out of the question, the baronet's two seats in Parliament being lost. He was both out of pocket and out of spirits by that catastrophe, failed in his health, and prophesied the speedy ruin of the Empire.

== See also ==
- Apportionment (politics)
- Functional constituencies in Hong Kong and Macau
- Gerrymandering
- Placemen
