= 1990 Special Honours =

British government recognitions

As part of the British honours system, Special Honours are issued at the Monarch's pleasure at any given time. The Special Honours refer to the awards made within royal prerogative, operational honours and other honours awarded outside the New Years Honours and Birthday Honours.

== Life Peer ==
=== Baronesses ===
- Heather Renwick, Mrs. Brigstocke, former High Mistress of St. Paul's Girls School.
- Julia Frances, Mrs. Cumberlege, C.B.E., D.L., chairman, South West Thames, Regional Health Authority. Former Member East Sussex County Council.
- Diana Catherine, Mrs. Eccles, chairman, Ealing District Health Authority. Member, Teesside Urban Development Corporation. Vice Chairman, Durham University Council.
- Shreela, Mrs. Flather, Councillor, Royal Borough of Windsor and Maidenhead. Former Member, Commission for Racial Equality. Member, HRH Duke of Edinburgh's Inquiry into British Housing.
- Patricia Lesley, Dr. Hollis, Leader, Norwich City Council 1983–1988. National Commissioner, English Heritage. Member, Press Council.

=== Barons ===
- Richard Hugh Cavendish, D.L., chairman, Holker Estate Group of Companies; Cumbria Rural Partnership Team. Member, Cumbria County Council, Cartmel Division.
- Stanley Clinton Davis, Consultant on European affairs and law, S. J. Berwin & Co.; Senior Adviser on European affairs, Hill and Knowlton. Former, Labour Member of Parliament; Member of the Commission of the European Communities.
- Richard Gordon Holme, C.B.E., chairman, European Strategy Counsel; Threadneedle Publishing Group and of the Constitutional Reform Centre.
- Professor Brian Robert Morris, Principal, St. David's University College, Lampeter. Chairman, Museums and Galleries Commission. Vice President, National Heritage Memorial Fund.
- Malcolm Everard MacLaren Pearson, Executive Chairman, PWS Holdings plc (Lloyd's Insurance Brokers). Member, Council for National Academic Awards.
- Ivor Seward Richard, Q.C., chairman, World Trade Centre Wales Ltd. Former, Labour Member of Parliament; UK Permanent Representative to UN; Member, Commission of EEC.
- Professor Ernest Jackson Lawson Soulsby, Professor of Animal Pathology, University of Cambridge.
- The Right Honourable Eric Varley, D.L., chairman and Chief Executive, Coalite Group. Former, Labour Member of Parliament; Cabinet Member (Secretary of State for Energy 1974–1975; Secretary of State for Industry 1979–1983).
- Sir (William) Oulton Wade, farmer and company director. Chairman and Chief Executive, Mollington Group of Companies. Chairman, Marlow Wade and Partners Ltd. Joint Treasurer, Conservative Party.

== Baronetcies ==
- Denis Thatcher MBE TD, of Scotney in the County of Kent on 7 December 1990.

== Most Distinguished Order of St Michael and St George ==
Order of St Michael and St George ribbon

=== Knight Grand Cross of the Order of St Michael and St George (GCMG) ===
- The Right Honourable Toaripi Lauti, PC.

== Royal Victorian Chain ==
- Her Royal Highness The Princess Margaret (Rose), Countess of Snowdon, C.I., G.C.V.O.

== Royal Victorian Order ==
=== Knight Commander (KCVO) ===
- Rear Admiral John Garnier, C.B.E., L.V.O.

== Decoration for Officers of the Royal Naval Reserve (RD) ==
=== Second Clasp ===
- Commander. T. C. Haile, R.D.*
- Commander B. T. Jones, R.D.*
- Acting Commander. P. W. Knatchbull, R.D.°
- Lieutenant Commander A. St. G. Dawson, R.D.*
- Lieutenant Commander J. A. T. Stock, R.D.*
- Lieutenant Commander R. T. Weston, R.D.*
