= Carol Thatcher =

English journalist (born 1953)

The Honourable Carol Thatcher
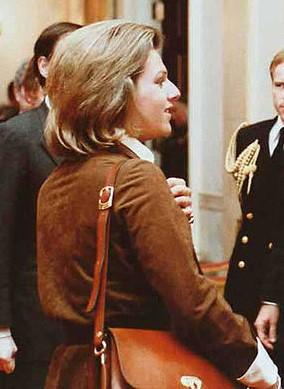
- Thatcher in 1979
- Born: Carol Jane Thatcher; 15 August 1953 (age 73); Hammersmith, London, England
- Education: University College London
- Occupations: Journalist; author; media personality
- Partner: Marco Grass
- Parents: Denis Thatcher (father); Margaret Thatcher (mother)
- Relatives: Mark Thatcher (twin brother); Alfred Roberts (maternal grandfather)

Carol Jane Thatcher (born 15 August 1953) is an English journalist, author and media personality. She is the daughter of Margaret Thatcher, the British prime minister from 1979 to 1990, and businessman Denis Thatcher.

She has written biographies of both her parents and also produced a documentary about her father which contained his only public interview. She won the fifth series of the reality show I'm a Celebrity...Get Me Out of Here!

== Early life ==
Thatcher was born on 15 August 1953 at Queen Charlotte's and Chelsea Hospital in Hammersmith, London. She and her twin brother, Mark, were born six weeks prematurely by caesarean section. According to Margaret Thatcher, her husband Denis Thatcher responded to seeing their children for the first time by saying, "My God, they look like rabbits. Put them back." Thatcher's mother was selected for the constituency of Finchley in North London in 1958 and was elected as a Member of Parliament in 1959.

In 1960, Thatcher was sent to Queenswood School, a girls' boarding school near Hatfield, Hertfordshire, before attending St Paul's Girls' School. She graduated with a law degree from University College London, before moving to Australia in 1977 to begin a journalism career. While she was there, her mother was elected prime minister. Thatcher later said, "You need quite good shock absorbers and a sense of humour to be the prime minister's child."

== Journalism career ==
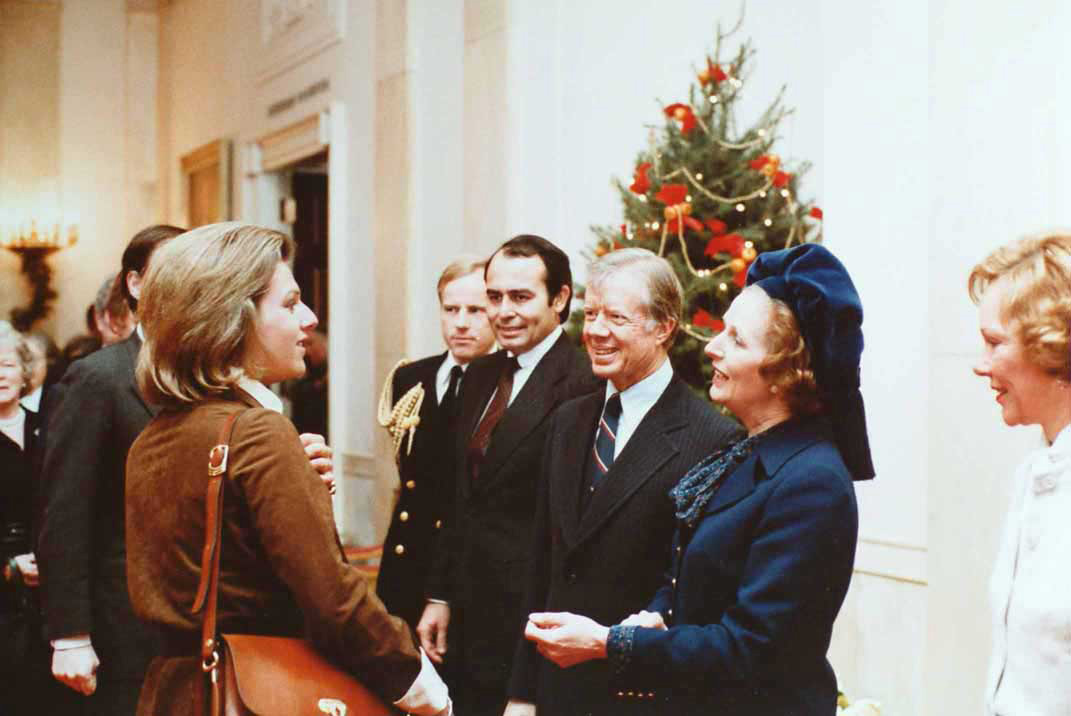
Thatcher (left) with U.S. President Jimmy Carter, her mother (middle right), and First Lady Rosalynn Carter (far right) in 1979

Thatcher began her career as a journalist in Australia, working on The Sydney Morning Herald from 1977 to 1979. She became a TV reporter at Channel Seven, also in Sydney, and later a reporter on its news morning show, 11AM. On her return to Britain, she worked as a presenter for LBC, BBC Radio 4, TV-am and wrote travel articles for The Daily Telegraph. Due to her mother's high-profile political position, many newspapers refused to publish work with her byline.

Her first book, Diary of an Election: with Margaret Thatcher on the campaign trail, was published in 1983. Her second book, a collaboration with tennis player Chris Evert Lloyd called Lloyd on Lloyd, was released three years later. It became Thatcher's first best-seller.

Later publications included a 1996 best-selling biography of her father, Below the Parapet. In 2003, Thatcher produced a Channel 4 documentary about him called Married to Maggie. Thatcher captured the only public interview Denis Thatcher ever gave; he died shortly after its release. Thatcher's freelance career has included contributing articles to magazines and papers as well as television work.

== Reality shows ==
=== I'm a Celebrity...Get Me Out of Here! ===
In November 2005 Thatcher appeared with a number of fellow celebrities on the ITV television show I'm a Celebrity...Get Me Out of Here! The format of the show meant that she would spend at least a week in the Australian rainforest with a minimal supply of food in basic living conditions. Ultimately, she emerged as the fifth series winner and second 'Queen of the Jungle'.

=== Most Haunted ===
Thatcher appeared on Living TV's Most Haunted on 13 February 2007 as a celebrity guest alongside presenter Yvette Fielding and medium David Wells to search for paranormal activity at Tatton Hall in Cheshire.

=== Mummy's War ===
In 2007, Thatcher travelled to the Falkland Islands and Argentina for the documentary Mummy's War, in order to explore the legacy of the Falklands War.

== The One Show ==
From 2006 to 2009, Thatcher was a freelance contributor to the BBC One magazine programme The One Show, making filmed reports and joining the presenters and guests in the studio for discussions.

On 3 February 2009, British media reported that during the 2009 Australian Open Thatcher had, in a conversation in the show's green room, referred to a black tennis player, reportedly Jo-Wilfried Tsonga, as a golliwog. According to The Times, Thatcher called Tsonga "half-golliwog" and "the golliwog Frog". Presenter Adrian Chiles, comedian Jo Brand, journalists and several guests were with Thatcher when she made the remark. The BBC stated that Thatcher would not work again on The One Show unless she made a more sincere apology. Thatcher refused, saying "I stand by what I said. I wasn't going to apologise. I never meant it in a racist way. It was shorthand. I described someone's appearance colloquially—someone I happen to greatly admire."

== Bibliography ==
- — (1983). Diary of an Election: With Margaret Thatcher on the Campaign Trail. Sidgwick & Jackson. ISBN 978-0283990687.
- Lloyd, Chris Evert; Lloyd, John (1986). — (ed.). Lloyd on Lloyd. Beaufort Books. ISBN 978-0825303746.
- — (1996). Below the Parapet: The Biography of Denis Thatcher. HarperCollins. ISBN 978-0002556057.
- — (2008). Swim on Part in the Goldfish Bowl: A Memoir. Headline Review. ISBN 978-0755317066.

== Personal life ==
Thatcher had a relationship with Jonathan Aitken, which ended in 1979. As this happened just after the Conservatives won the general election, Aitken's breaking up with Thatcher is alleged to have been the reason for his being bypassed for a ministerial career; Thatcher's mother, the Prime Minister at the time, reportedly told cabinet colleagues that she was "damned" if she was going to give a job to a man "who had made Carol cry".

Thatcher lives with ski instructor Marco Grass in Klosters, Switzerland.

Preceded by Joe Pasquale	I'm A Celebrity, Get Me Out of Here! Winner & Queen of The Jungle; 2005	Succeeded by Matt Willis
