= Mark Thatcher =

English businessman and baronet (born 1953)

The Honourable Sir Mark Thatcher Bt
- Born: 15 August 1953 (age 73); Hammersmith, London, England
- Education: Harrow School
- Occupation: Businessman
- Spouses: Diane Burgdorf (m. 1987, divorced); Sarah-Jane Russell (m. 2008)
- Children: 2
- Parents: Denis Thatcher (father); Margaret Thatcher (mother)
- Relatives: Carol Thatcher (twin sister); Alfred Roberts (maternal grandfather)
- Family: Thatcher family

Sir Mark Thatcher, 2nd Baronet (born 15 August 1953) is an English businessman. He is the son of Margaret Thatcher, Prime Minister of the United Kingdom from 1979 to 1990, and Sir Denis Thatcher, 1st Baronet; his sister is Carol Thatcher.

His early career in business led to suggestions that he was benefiting from his mother's position, notably in relation to the Al-Yamamah arms deal. He left the UK in 1986, and has since lived in the United States, Switzerland, Monaco, South Africa, Gibraltar, Barbados, Guernsey, and Spain. In 2003, The Sunday Times estimated his wealth at £60 million, most of which was suggested to be in offshore accounts.

In 2005, he was convicted and given a four-year suspended prison sentence and fined in South Africa for funding the 2004 Equatorial Guinea coup attempt.

He has two children by his first wife, Diane Burgdorf. He married his second wife, Sarah-Jane Russell (née Clemence), in 2008. Following his father's death in 2003, he became Sir Mark Thatcher and succeeded to the Thatcher baronetcy, an hereditary title which had unusually been given to his father in 1990 (this being the only baronetcy created since 1964).

== Early life ==
Thatcher and his twin sister, Carol, were born six weeks prematurely by caesarean section on 15 August 1953 at Queen Charlotte's and Chelsea Hospital in Hammersmith, London, the same year that their mother qualified as a barrister. Their early years were spent in Chelsea, London. Their mother was narrowly defeated in her bid to become the Conservative Party candidate in the 1955 Orpington by-election. She was first elected to Parliament at the 1959 general election. The children, aged six at the time, featured in her first television interview. His sister observed: "All my childhood memories of my mother were just someone who was superwoman before the phrase had been invented. She was always flat out, she never relaxed, household chores were done at breakneck speed in order to get back to the parliamentary correspondence or get on with making up a speech."

Mark was sent to board at Belmont School at the age of eight and then to Harrow School, which he left in 1971 having passed three O Level exams. He went on to study accountancy but failed his accountancy exams with Touche Ross on three occasions.

Having taken various short-term jobs Thatcher moved to Hong Kong, where he built up a network of business connections, particularly in the Middle East and in motor racing. In 1977, he set up Mark Thatcher Racing, which ran into financial difficulties.

== Missing during 1982 Paris-Dakar rally ==
On 8 January 1982, a Friday, Thatcher and his French co-driver, Anny-Charlotte Verney, went missing in Algeria in the Sahara desert whilst driving a Peugeot 504 in the Paris-Dakar Rally. Reportedly their car suffered a broken axle after they strayed off of the course. After three days, they were rescued by helicopter on 11 January in the desert 43 miles (69 km) from Timimoun. The Prime Minister insisted on paying £2,000 personally towards the cost of the search.

Before competing he said:

- "I've now raced in Le Mans and other things – this rally is no problem."

In 2004, Thatcher wrote about his experience:

- "I did absolutely no preparation. Nothing."
- "We must have hit something. ... We stopped. The others stopped too, took a note of where we were and went on. But the silly bastards – instead of telling everyone we were 25 miles east when they finished the section, they told them we were 25 miles west."
- "So The Boss (the prime minister) does entirely the right thing, picks up the phone to the ambassador in Algiers and says, "Can you find out what is going on?" The ambassador then rings the prefect of the region who says there are four people missing and that I am one of them."

== Business career ==
During the mid to late 1980s, concerns were frequently expressed about possible conflicts of interest between his business interests and his mother's political visits. In 1984 his mother faced questions in the House of Commons about his involvement in representing the bid of Cementation, a British company and a subsidiary of Trafalgar House, to build a university in Oman at a time when the prime minister was urging Omanis to buy British.

He has denied claims that in 1985 he received millions of pounds in commissions in relation to the £45 billion Al-Yamamah arms deal, a controversial arms sale by British Aerospace to Saudi Arabia; he has not denied that a house in Belgravia, London, was purchased for him for £1 million in 1987 by an offshore company controlled by Wafic Saïd, a middleman in the deal. In 1986 his mother again faced questions in the House of Commons, this time over her son's relationship with the Sultan of Brunei.

Sir Bernard Ingham, the Prime Minister's press secretary, suggested that he could best help the government win the 1987 general election by leaving the country. Margaret Thatcher's biographer, David Cannadine, stated that Mark Thatcher "traded shamelessly on his mother's name" and that he "continued to attract controversy and investigation from the tax authorities", much to his mother's embarrassment. Alan Clark mentions the "Mark problem" in his published diaries. He moved to Texas, where he worked for David Wickins of Lotus Cars and British Car Auctions and met his first wife in 1987.

In the United States he started Monteagle Marketing, a profitable company that sold whisky and clothing. During this period he spent some time in Switzerland as a tax exile, until he was forced to leave after the Swiss authorities began to question his residency qualifications. A security alarm business he ran in the United States failed and in 1996 he was prosecuted for tax evasion, at which point he moved to Constantia, South Africa, with his wife and their two children.

In 1998 South African authorities investigated a company owned by Thatcher for allegedly running loan shark operations. According to the Star of Johannesburg, the company had offered unofficial small loans to hundreds of police officers, military personnel and civil servants, and then pursued them with debt collectors. He claimed that officers had defrauded him and charges were dropped. It was also suggested that he had profited from contracts to supply aviation fuel in various African countries. In 2003, following the death of his father, he was allowed to use the title of 'Sir' due to his inheritance of the Thatcher baronetcy a year before he was arrested in South Africa in connection with the 2004 Equatorial Guinea coup attempt. He pleaded guilty to breaking anti-mercenary legislation in January 2005. At this time The Sunday Times suggested that he had personal assets of £60 million, most of which was in offshore accounts.

In 2016 historic documents relating to Thatcher and Oman, expected to be released under the 30-year rule, were retained by the Government. The Guardian noted that the decision was made by John Whittingdale, a former political secretary to Margaret Thatcher.

== 2004 Equatorial Guinea coup d'état attempt ==
Thatcher was arrested at his home in Constantia, Cape Town, South Africa, in August 2004 and was charged with contravening two sections of South Africa's Foreign Military Assistance Act, which bans South African residents from taking part in any foreign military activity. The charges related to possible funding and logistical assistance in relation to an attempted coup in Equatorial Guinea organized by Thatcher's friend, Simon Mann. He was released on 2 million rand bail.

On 24 November 2004, the Cape Town High Court upheld a subpoena from the South African Justice Ministry that required him to answer under oath questions from Equatorial Guinean authorities regarding the alleged coup attempt. He was due to face questioning on 25 November 2004, regarding offenses under the South African Foreign Military Assistance Act; these proceedings were later postponed until 8 April 2005. Ultimately, following a process of plea bargaining, Thatcher pleaded guilty in January 2005 to breaking anti-mercenary legislation in South Africa by investing in an aircraft without taking proper investigations into what it would be used for, admitting in court that he had paid the money, but said he was under the impression it was to be invested in an air ambulance service to help impoverished Africans. The judge rejected this explanation and Thatcher was fined R3,000,000 and received a four-year suspended prison sentence. An advisor to Equatorial Guinea's President Teodoro Obiang Nguema Mbasogo told the BBC's Focus on Africa television programme that: "We are confident that justice has been done", and did not indicate that the country would seek Thatcher's extradition.

During his trial in Equatorial Guinea in June 2008 Simon Mann said that Thatcher "was not just an investor, he came completely on board and became a part of the management team" of the coup plot. In 2024, Mann provided The Daily Telegraph with access to emails and unpublished memoirs providing additional information. On the 20th anniversary of the coup attempt, the newspaper published an article on the coup which states the emails "show that Sir Mark negotiated a profit-sharing arrangement".

== Personal life ==
Thatcher moved to Dallas, Texas, in the mid-1980s, where he met his first wife, Diane Burgdorf (later wife of James Beckett.) They married 14 February 1987. Their first child was born in 1989, and their second child was born in 1993. In 1992, he became The Honourable Mark Thatcher when his mother was made a life peer. In 1996, he moved to South Africa following financial scandals in the United States.

In 2003, he became The Honourable Sir Mark Thatcher, 2nd Baronet of Scotney when he succeeded to the hereditary Thatcher baronetcy awarded to his father in 1990. He and his wife announced their intention to divorce in September 2005 after eighteen years of marriage. His wife moved back to the United States with their children, the same year that he pleaded guilty in relation to an attempted coup in Equatorial Guinea. Questions were raised in the UK Parliament about whether he should be stripped of his title.

Following his guilty plea and his divorce, he left South Africa in 2005 for Monaco on a one-year temporary residency permit, while his wife and children returned to the United States. Thatcher was unable to get a US visa due to his South African conviction and remains barred from entering the United States.

His Monaco residency was not renewed as he was said to be on a list of "undesirables" who would not be allowed further residency and he was required to leave by mid-2006. He was refused residency in Switzerland and settled in Gibraltar, where he married his second wife, Sarah-Jane Russell, in March 2008. Russell is the daughter of Terence J. Clemence, a property developer, and sister to Claudia, Viscountess Rothermere. She was formerly married to Lord Francis Hastings Russell, the younger son of John Russell, 13th Duke of Bedford.

He was in Barbados when he received news of his mother's death. He returned to the UK to act as chief mourner at her funeral, which took place at St Paul's Cathedral, London, on 17 April 2013.

In April 2016, Thatcher was named in the Panama Papers scandal; he has ownership of a house in Barbados as the beneficiary of a trust.

In 2019, he became a grandfather.

== Titles and styles ==
Thatcher has been entitled to use the pre-nominal style "The Honourable" since the elevation of his mother to the peerage as a baroness in 1992; he shares this courtesy with his twin sister, Carol. Following the death of his father in 2003, he inherited the Thatcher baronetcy which had been awarded to his father in 1990, the first baronetcy created since 1964. Following his conviction in relation to the Equatorial Guinea coup d'état in 2004, it was suggested that he should be stripped of the title.

== Arms ==
Coat of arms of The Honorable Sir Mark Thatcher, Bt.
Crest A demi-lion rampant Or within a circlet of New Zealand ferns Argent, holding between the fore-paws a pair of shears proper. Escutcheon Gules, two chevrons Or between three crosses moline Argent. On a chief Azure, between two fleurs-de-lis Argent, a mural crown Or masoned Gules.

== Further viewing ==
- Once Upon a Coup PBS, August 2009 (documentary)
- Halloran, Paul; Hollingsworth, Mark (2006). Thatcher's Fortunes: The Life and Times of Mark Thatcher. Mainstream Publishing. ISBN 1845961188.
- Halloran, Paul; Hollingsworth, Mark (1995). Thatcher's Gold: Life and Times of Mark Thatcher. Simon & Schuster. ISBN 0671712489.
- Mentions of Mark Thatcher in Hansard (103 references, relating to Dakar Rally, Cementation contracts, arms sales to the Middle East, security costs and other matters)

Baronetage of the United Kingdom
Preceded by Sir Denis Thatcher	Baronet (of Scotney); 2003–present	Incumbent; Heir apparent: Michael Thatcher
