= Scotney Castle SSSI =

Protected area in Kent, England

Coordinates: 51.091°N 0.410°E

Scotney Castle
- Site of Special Scientific Interest
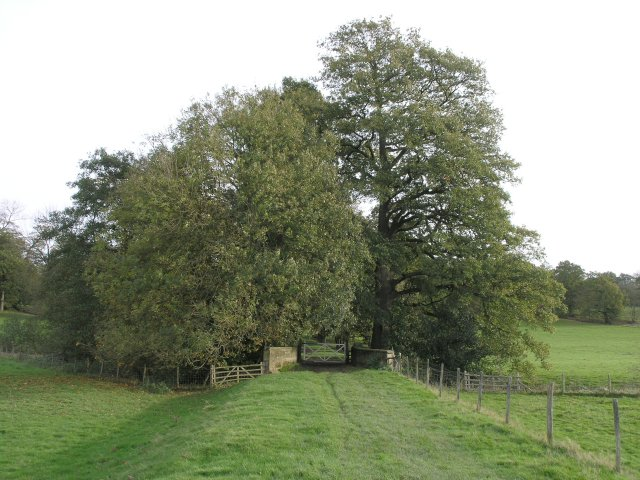
- Location of Scotney Castle.
- Area of search: Kent
- Grid reference: TQ 689 352
- Interest: Biological
- Area: 112.5 hectares (278 acres)
- Notification date: 1991
- Location map: Magic Map

Scotney Castle SSSI is a 112.5-hectare (278-acre) biological Site of Special Scientific Interest in the grounds of Scotney Castle, a National Trust property south-east of Tunbridge Wells in Kent.

This site has parkland, grassland, woodland. There are dormice, a protected species, and several nationally scarce invertebrates, such as Rolph's door snail. There are man-made ponds and a moat.

The gardens are open to the public.
