= Denis Thatcher =

English businessman (1915–2003)

Sir Denis Thatcher Bt MBE TD CStJ
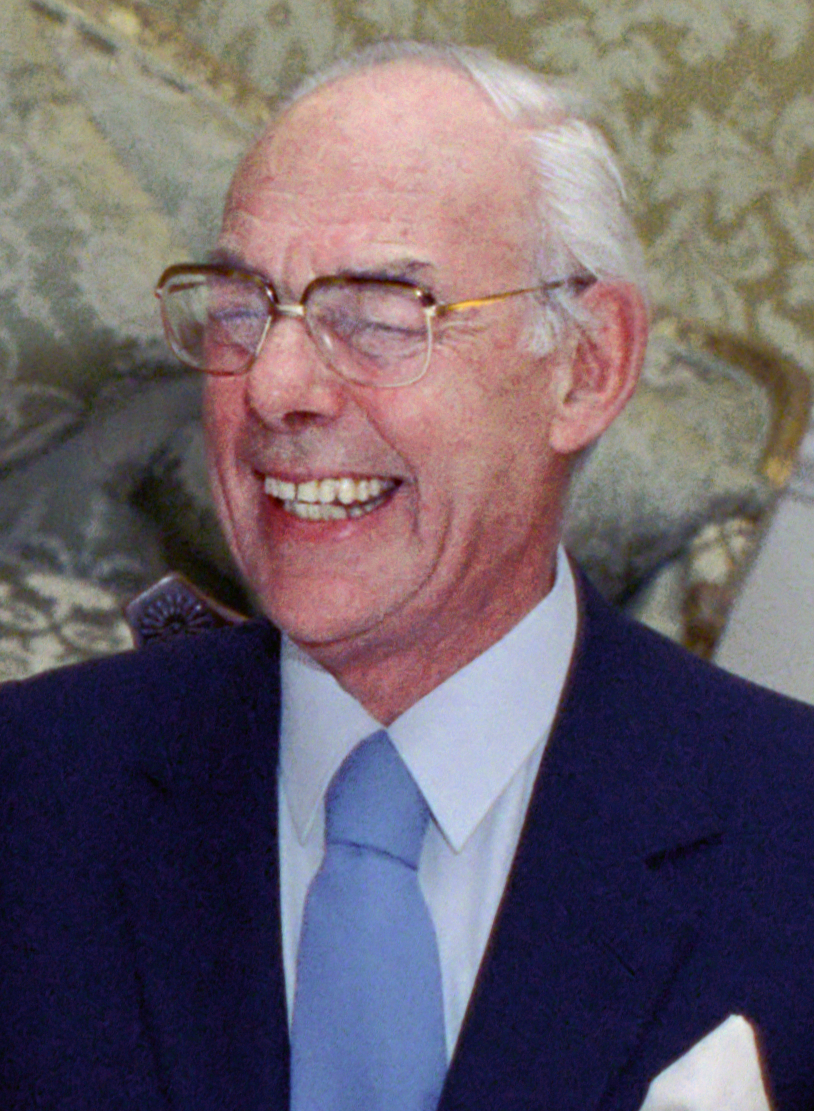
- Thatcher in 1988
- Born: 10 May 1915; Lewisham, London, England
- Died: 26 June 2003 (aged 88); Chelsea, London, England
- Resting place: Royal Hospital Chelsea
- Education: Mill Hill School
- Occupation: Businessman
- Known for: Spouse of the prime minister of the United Kingdom (1979‍–‍1990)
- Political party: Conservative
- Spouses: Margot Kempson (m. 1942; div. 1948) Margaret Roberts (m. 1951)
- Children: Mark; Carol
- Military career
- Allegiance: United Kingdom
- Branch: British Army
- Service years: 1938–1965
- Rank: Major
- Service number: 77306
- Units: Queen's Own Royal West Kent Regiment; Royal Artillery
- Conflicts: Second World War; Italian campaign; Allied invasion of Sicily; Operation Goldflake
- Awards

Sir Denis Thatcher, 1st Baronet, MBE, TD, CStJ (10 May 1915 – 26 June 2003) was an English businessman and the husband of Margaret Thatcher, who served as the first female British prime minister from 1979 to 1990; thus, he became the first male prime ministerial spouse.

Thatcher was granted the Thatcher baronetcy in 1990, the only baronetcy created since 1964, and remains the most recent non-royal to have been awarded a hereditary title.

== Early life ==
Denis Thatcher was born on 10 May 1915 at 26 Southbrook Road, Lee, Lewisham, London, as the first child of New Zealand–born British businessman Thomas Herbert "Jack" Thatcher and Lilian Kathleen Bird. At age eight, Denis entered a preparatory school in Bognor Regis as a boarder, following which he attended the nonconformist public school Mill Hill School in north London. At school he excelled at cricket, being a left-handed batsman.

Thatcher left Mill Hill School in 1933 and joined the family paint and preservatives business, Atlas Preservatives. He also studied accountancy to improve his grasp of business, and in 1935 he was appointed works manager. He joined the Territorial Army shortly after the Munich crisis, as he was convinced war was imminent – a view reinforced by a visit he made to Nazi Germany with his father's business in 1937.

== Military career ==
During the Second World War, Thatcher was commissioned as a second lieutenant into the 34th (The Queen's Own Royal West Kent) Searchlight Regiment, Royal Artillery. He transferred to the Royal Artillery on 1 August 1940. During the war he was promoted to war substantive captain and temporary major. He served throughout the Allied invasion of Sicily and the Italian campaign and was twice mentioned in dispatches, and in 1945 was appointed a Member of the Order of the British Empire (MBE). The first mention in dispatches came on 11 January 1945, for service in Italy, and the second on 29 November 1945, again for Italian service.

His MBE was gazetted on 20 September 1945, and was awarded for his efforts in initiating and supporting Operation Goldflake, the transfer of I Canadian Corps from Italy to the north-west European theatre of operations. Thatcher was based in Marseille, attached to HQ 203 sub-area. In the recommendation for the MBE (dated 28 March 1945), his commanding officer wrote: "Maj. Thatcher set an outstanding example of energy, initiative and drive. He deserves most of the credit for [...] the excellence of the work done."

Thatcher also received the approximate French equivalent of a mention when he was cited in orders at Corps d'Armée level for his efforts in promoting smooth relations between the Commonwealth military forces and the French civil and military authorities. He was promoted to substantive lieutenant on 11 April 1945. Demobilised in 1946, he returned to run the family business – his father having died (aged 57) on 24 June 1943, when Thatcher was in Sicily. Because of army commitments, Thatcher was unable to attend the funeral.

He remained in the Territorial Army reserve of officers until reaching the age limit for service on 10 May 1965, when he retired, retaining the honorary rank of major.

On 21 September 1982 he was awarded the Territorial Decoration (TD) for his service.

== Marriages ==
Thatcher married twice, during wartime to Margot Kempson in 1942 (divorced in 1948), and in 1951 to Margaret Roberts.

=== Margot Kempson ===
On 28 March 1942, Thatcher married Margaret Doris "Margot" Kempson, the daughter of a businessman, at St Mary's Church in Monken Hadley. They had met at an officers' dance at Grosvenor House the year before.

Thatcher and his first wife never lived together. Their married life became confined to snatched weekends and irregular leaves as Thatcher was often abroad during the war. When Thatcher returned to England after being demobilised in 1946, his wife told him she had met someone else and wanted a divorce.

Thatcher was so traumatised by the event that he completely refused to talk about his first marriage or the separation, even to his daughter, as she states in her 1996 biography of him. Thatcher's two children found out about his first marriage only in 1976 (by which time, their mother had become Leader of the Opposition) and then only when the media revealed it.

=== Margaret Thatcher ===
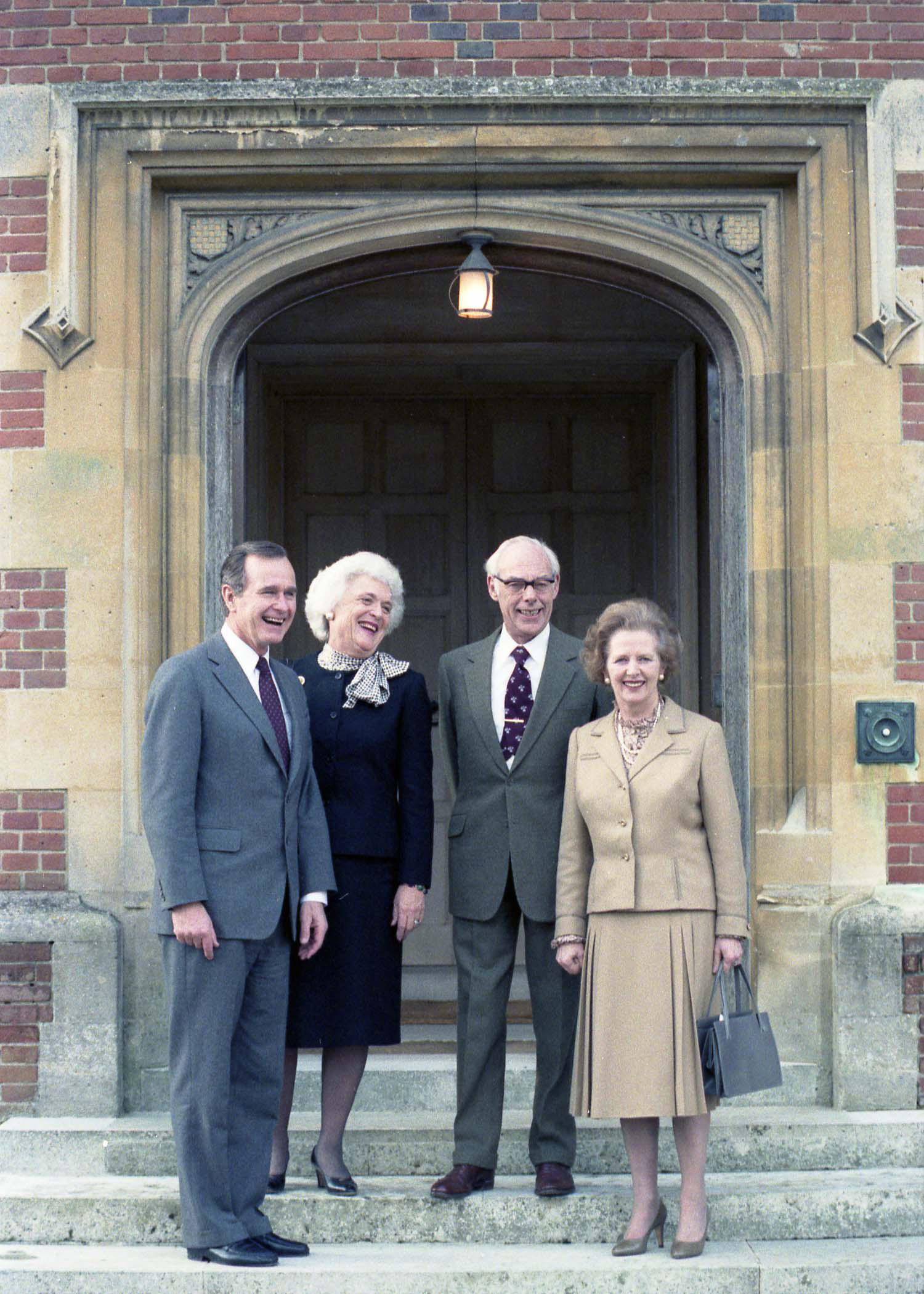
Denis and Margaret Thatcher with US vice president George Bush and second lady Barbara Bush at Chequers in 1984

In February 1949, at a Paint Trades Federation function in Dartford, he met Margaret Hilda Roberts, a chemist and newly selected parliamentary candidate. When she met Denis for the first time, she described him as "not a very attractive creature" and "very reserved but quite nice". They married on 13 December 1951, at Wesley's Chapel in City Road, London; the Robertses were Methodists. Margaret Thatcher was elected Leader of the Conservative Party in 1975. She went on to win the 1979 general election to become the first female prime minister in British history. Denis became the first husband of a British prime minister.

In 1953, they had twin children (Carol and Mark), who were born on 15 August at Queen Charlotte's and Chelsea Hospital in Hammersmith, seven weeks premature. Thatcher was watching the deciding Test of the 1953 Ashes series at the time of the twins' birth. They had watched the Coronation earlier in the year from Parliament Square.

Not long after the 1964 general election, Thatcher suffered a nervous breakdown which put a severe strain on his marriage. The breakdown was probably caused by the increasing pressure of running the family business, caring for his relatives, and his wife's preoccupation with her political career, which left him lonely and exhausted. Thatcher sailed to South Africa and stayed there for two months to recuperate. His wife's biographer David Cannadine described it as "the greatest crisis of their marriage", but immediately after, he recovered and returned home, where he maintained a happy marriage for the rest of his life.

This second marriage for Thatcher led to the future prime minister being sometimes referred to as "Mrs Denis Thatcher" in such sources as selection minutes, travel itineraries, and society publications such as Queen, even after she was elected a Member of Parliament. As Margaret's political career progressed, she preferred to be known only as "Mrs Thatcher".

According to John Campbell, a biographer of his wife, "their marriage was more a partnership of mutual convenience than a romance", quoting their daughter Carol in her biography of Denis:

If marriage is either a takeover or a merger, then my parents enjoyed the latter. There was a great deal of common ground and a tacit laissez faire agreement that they would get on with their own interests and activities. There was no possessiveness, nor any expectation that one partner's career should take precedence.

== Business career ==
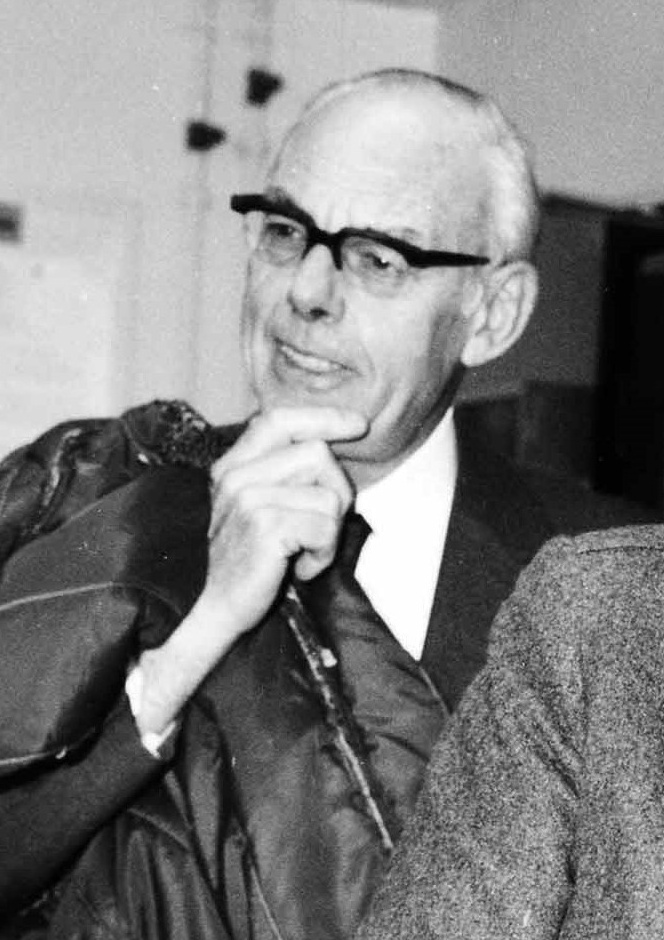
Thatcher in 1982

Thatcher was already a wealthy man when he met Margaret, and he financed her training as a barrister, and a home in Chelsea, London. He also bought a large house in Lamberhurst, Kent, in 1965. His firm employed 200 people by 1957.

Thatcher became managing director of his family's firm Atlas Preservatives in 1947 and chairman in 1951, leading its overseas expansion. By the early 1960s, he found being in sole control of the family company difficult. This, his wife's political career, and their desire for financial security caused Thatcher to sell Atlas to Castrol in 1965 for £530,000 (£9,000,000 today). He continued to run Atlas and received a seat on Castrol's board; after Burmah Oil took over Castrol in 1966, Thatcher became a senior divisional director, managing the planning and control department. He retired from Burmah in June 1975, four months after his wife won the Conservative Party leadership election.

In addition to being a director of Burmah Oil, Thatcher was a director and deputy chairman of Attwoods from July 1983 until January 1994. He was also a director of Quinton Hazell and a consultant to Amec and CSX.

His wife's biographer Robin Harris concludes:

He was not, in fact, a particularly good businessman: he had inherited shares in a family firm which he managed, and he was lucky enough to sell his interest on terms that gave him a large pay-off and a good salary to boot. But it is significant that he left a very modest legacy at his death. This was because, throughout his life, and despite his training as an accountant and his eagle-eyed scrutiny of the Stock Exchange, he was a poor investor. Once his wife had become Prime Minister, and even after her retirement, it was Denis who lived off her and not vice versa. He matched Alf Roberts in his dislike of spending his own money. More generally, while (in contrast to certain of his successors) he did not raise eyebrows about exploiting his position, he certainly made the most of it. He was a celebrity exclusively because of whom he had married.

== Public life and perceptions ==
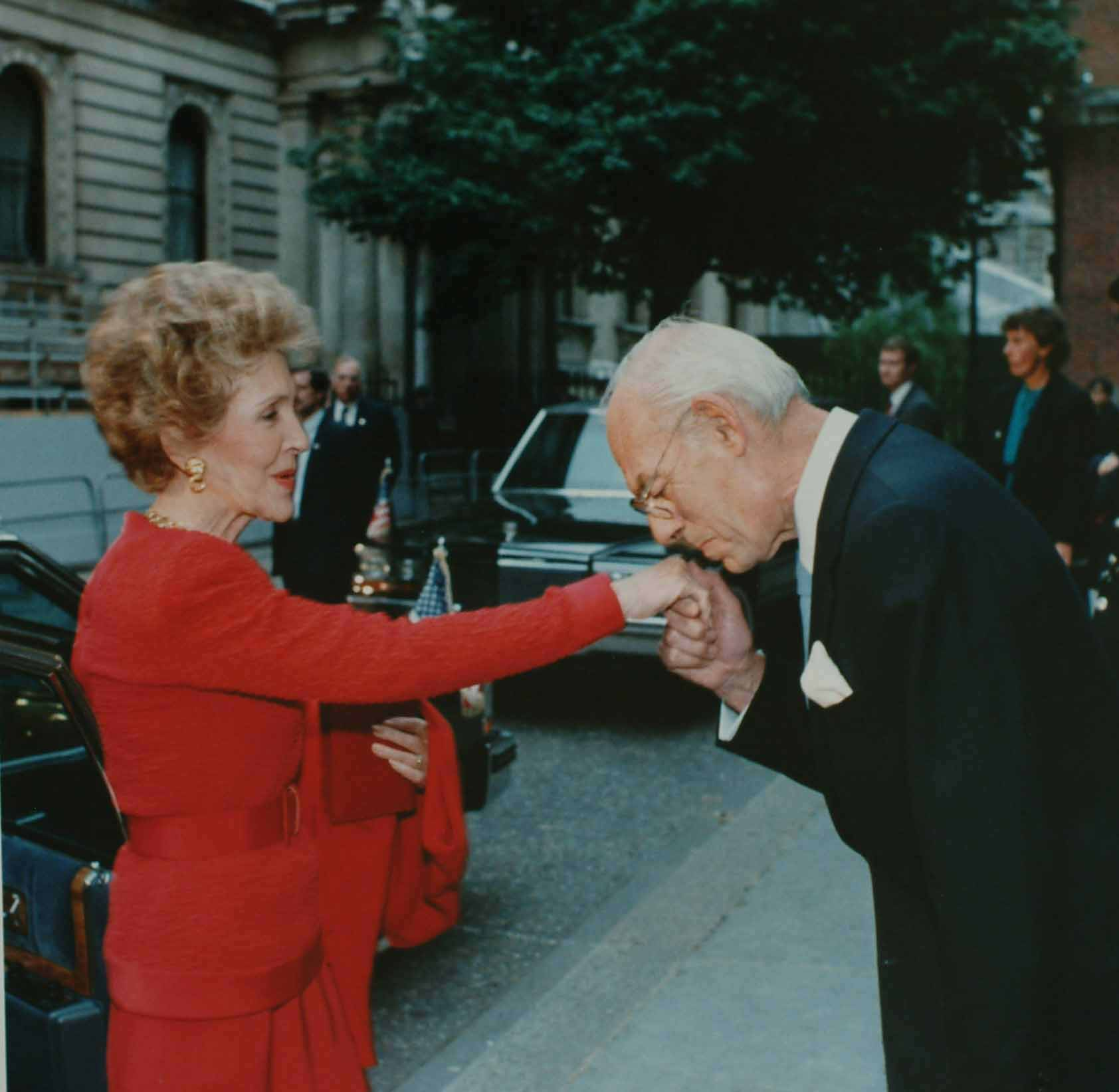
Thatcher and US first lady Nancy Reagan at Downing Street in 1988

Thatcher refused press interviews and made only brief speeches. When he did speak to the press, he called his wife "The Boss". Margaret Thatcher often acknowledged her husband's support. In her autobiography, she wrote: "I could never have been Prime Minister for more than 11 years without Denis by my side." Thatcher saw his role as helping her survive the stress of the job, which he urged her to resign on the tenth anniversary of her becoming prime minister in 1989, sensing that otherwise she would be forced out.

In an interview with The Times in October 1970, Thatcher said: "I don't pretend that I'm anything but an honest-to-God right-winger – those are my views and I don't care who knows 'em." His public image was shaped by the satirical "Dear Bill" columns appearing since 1979 in Private Eye, which portrayed him as a "juniper-sozzled, rightwing, golf-obsessed halfwit", and Thatcher found it useful to play along with this image to avoid allegations of unduly influencing his wife in political matters.

Given his professional background, Thatcher served as an advisor on financial matters, warning Margaret about the poor condition of British Leyland after reviewing its books. He often insisted that she avoid overwork, to little avail, sometimes pleading, "Bed, woman!" They otherwise usually kept their careers separate; an exception was when Thatcher accompanied his wife on a 1967 visit to the United States sponsored by the International Visitor Leadership Program.

Thatcher was consistent in his strong opposition to the death penalty, calling it "absolutely awful" and "barbaric". He said that he was against it because of innocent people being wrongly hanged and because juries could also be afraid to convict for fear of making a mistake. Like his wife, Thatcher was consistently anti-socialist. He told his daughter in 1995 that he would have banned trade unions altogether in Britain. He had low regard for the BBC, thinking it was biased against his wife and her government, as well as unpatriotic. In his most famous outburst about the corporation, he came out with a homophobic insult by claiming his wife had been "stitched up by bloody BBC poofs and Trots" when she was questioned by a member of the public about the sinking of the ARA General Belgrano on Nationwide in 1983.

Thatcher was reported by New Zealand (NZ) broadcaster and former diplomat Chris Laidlaw—at the time NZ High Commissioner to Zimbabwe—as leaning towards him during a Commonwealth Heads of Government Meeting, asking "So, what do you think the fuzzy wuzzies are up to?"

In December 1990, following the resignation of his wife as prime minister, it was announced that Thatcher would be created a baronet; he was the first, and only, baronetcy created since 1964. The award was gazetted in February 1991, giving his title as Sir Denis Thatcher, 1st Baronet, of Scotney in the County of Kent. Thus, his wife was entitled to style herself Lady Thatcher while retaining her seat in the House of Commons; however, she made it known that she preferred to remain addressed as "Mrs Thatcher", and would not use the style. She was created a life peeress as Baroness Thatcher (Lady Thatcher in her own right) shortly after she retired from the Commons in 1992.

In July 1991, Thatcher was created a Commander of the Order of St John; his wife was also made a Dame of the order.

== Illness and death ==
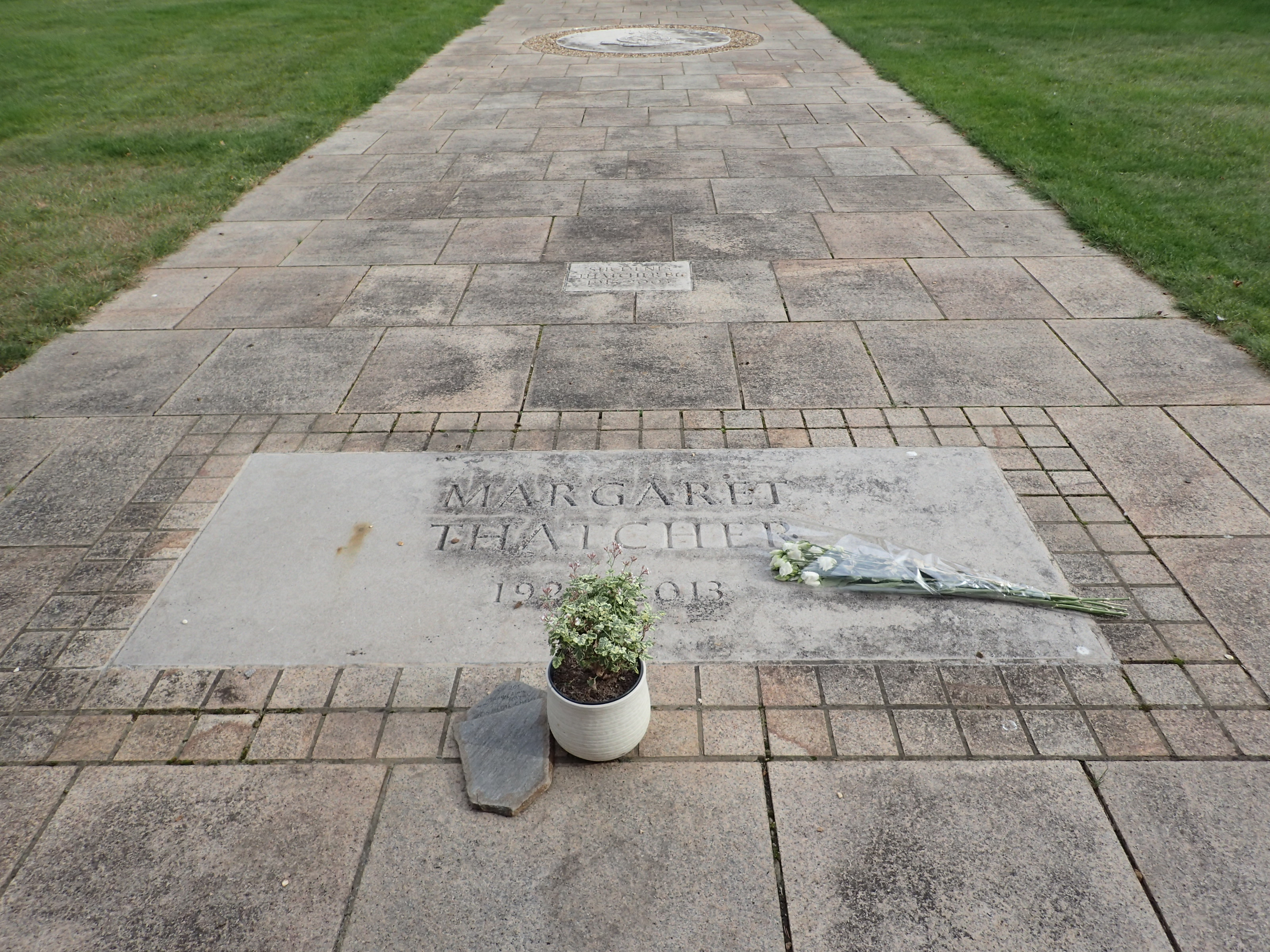
Plaques on the graves of Denis and Margaret Thatcher at the Royal Hospital Chelsea (pictured in 2023)

In the autumn of 1992, Thatcher was diagnosed with prostate cancer, but it was caught early. He responded well to treatment.

On 17 January 2003, Thatcher underwent a six-hour heart-bypass operation and aortic valve operation at a Harley Street clinic. He had complained of breathlessness for several weeks before Christmas 2002, and the problem was diagnosed in early January. He left the clinic on 28 January 2003 and appeared to recover fully after recuperation. Thatcher returned home on 14 February and visited his son Mark in South Africa in April, but in early June, he again complained of breathlessness and listlessness. Lady Thatcher's staff also thought he looked unwell, and on 13 June, he was admitted to the Royal Brompton Hospital for further tests. Nothing wrong was found with his heart but terminal pancreatic cancer was diagnosed, along with fluid in his lungs. He was told nothing could be done for him, and after seven days there, on 20 June, he was transferred to the Lister Hospital. He lost consciousness on 24 June and never regained it. He died on the morning of 26 June, at the age of 88.

His funeral service took place on 3 July 2003 at the chapel of the Royal Hospital Chelsea in London, followed by a cremation at Mortlake Crematorium in Richmond, London. On 30 October, a memorial service was held at Westminster Abbey. His ashes were buried under a white marble marker just outside the Royal Hospital in Chelsea. Following his wife's death in 2013, her ashes were buried near his.

== Profiles ==
=== Married to Maggie ===
Produced by his daughter Carol, Thatcher's single public interview (which took place in October 2002) was made into a documentary film titled Married to Maggie, broadcast following his death. In it he revealed that the spouses he liked were Raisa Gorbacheva, Nancy Reagan and Barbara Bush. He called his wife's successor, John Major, "a ghastly prime minister", saying that "[i]t would have been a [...] very good thing" had he lost the 1992 general election. He added that he thought his wife was "the best prime minister since Churchill."

=== Below the Parapet ===
Below the Parapet (1996) is the biography by his daughter Carol. In it, he said that politics as a profession or way of life did not appeal to him. World leaders he got on with included George H. W. Bush, F. W. de Klerk, Hussein of Jordan and Mikhail Gorbachev, whilst he disliked Indira Gandhi and Sir Sonny Ramphal. Thatcher admitted that he was not sure where the Falkland Islands were until they were invaded in 1982.

== Medals and honours ==
Thatcher was awarded the following medals and honours:

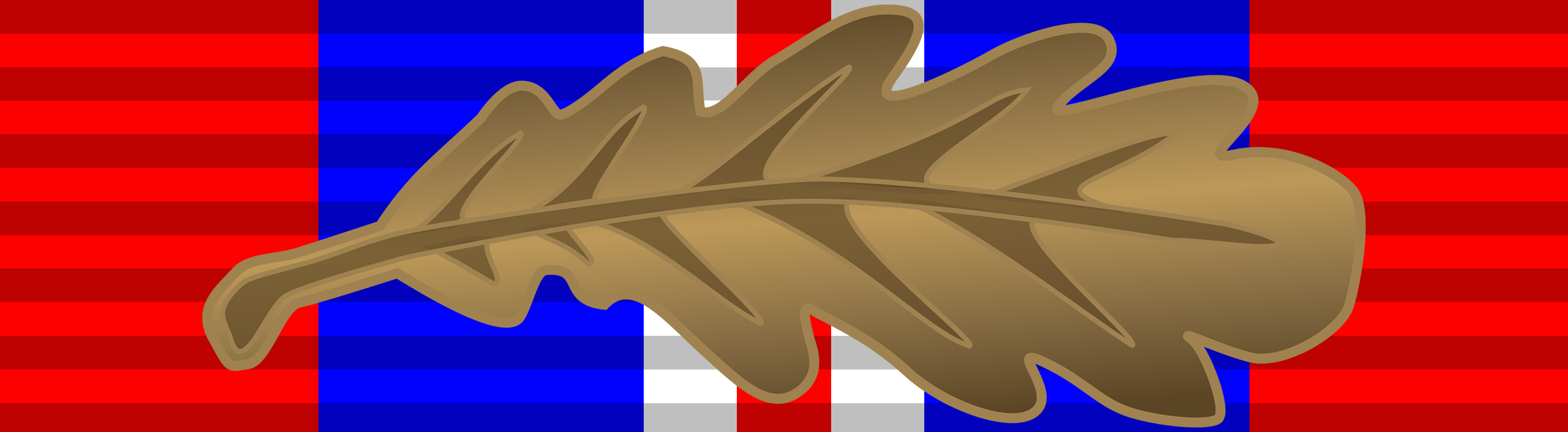

| Year | Ribbon | Appointment | Letters |
|---|---|---|---|
| 1945 | | War Medal 1939–1945 with Mention in Dispatches Oakleaf | —N/a |
| 1945 | | Italy Star | —N/a |
| 1945 | | 1939–1945 Star | —N/a |
| 1945 | | Member of the Order of the British Empire (Military Division) | MBE |
| 1982 | | Territorial Decoration | TD |
| 1990 | | Baronetcy | Bt |
| 1991 | | Commander of the Order of St John | CStJ |

Coat of arms of Sir Denis Thatcher, Bt
| Crest A demi-lion rampant Or within a circlet of New Zealand ferns Argent, holding between the fore-paws a pair of shears proper. Escutcheon Gules, two chevrons Or between three crosses moline Argent. On a chief Azure, between two fleurs-de-lis Argent, a mural crown Or masoned Gules. |

Baronetage of the United Kingdom
| New creation | Baronet (of Scotney); 1990–2003 | Succeeded by Mark Thatcher |
Unofficial roles
| Preceded by Audrey Callaghan | Spouse of the Prime Minister of the United Kingdom; 1979–1990 | Succeeded by Norma Major |
