= Finkin Street Methodist Church =

Grade II listed building in Grantham, Lincolnshire

Coordinates: 52.912606°N 0.641278°W

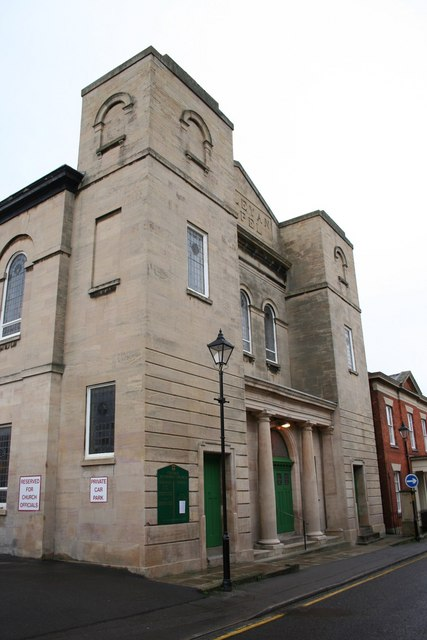
- Front of the church

- Location within Lincolnshire
- OS grid reference: SK 91468 35902
- Location: Grantham
- Country: England
- Denomination: Methodist

History
- Status: Chapel
- Founded: 1840

Architecture
- Functional status: Active
- Heritage designation: Grade II

Finkin Street Chapel is a Grade II listed building in Grantham, Lincolnshire. The Wesleyan Methodist chapel was built in 1840 and was the childhood church of Margaret Thatcher, former Prime Minister of the United Kingdom.

The chapel has a lectern dedicated to Thatcher's father, Alfred Roberts, who was a local preacher there.

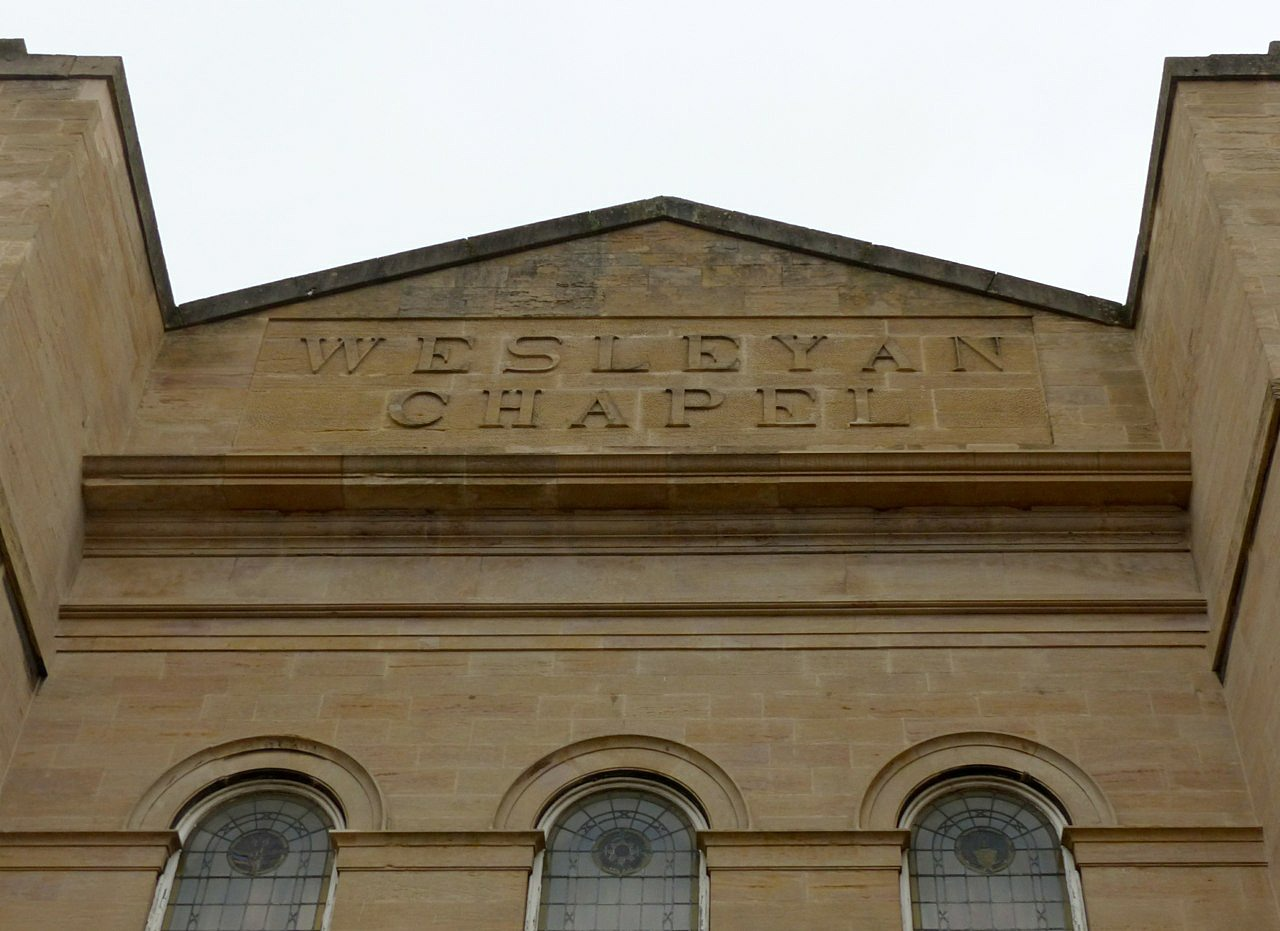
Detail of the front of the building. It was originally a Wesleyan chapel.

In 2008, the congregation of the Central Methodist Church, Finkin Street joined with the congregation of St Peter's Hill United Reformed Church in Castlegate to form a local ecumenical partnership, ChristChurch Grantham. A decision was then taken in April 2011 to keep the Methodist premises on Finkin Street and sell the URC premises on Castlegate. The congregation meeting weekly in the chapel is now known as ChristChurch.
