= Alfred Roberts =

English alderman and mayor (1892–1970)

Alfred Roberts JP

Municipal posts
- 1943–1952: Alderman of Grantham
- 1945–1946: Mayor of Grantham

Personal details
- Born: 18 April 1892 Ringstead, Northamptonshire, England
- Died: 10 February 1970 (aged 77) Grantham, Lincolnshire, England
- Party: Independent
- Spouses: Beatrice Stephenson (m. 1917; died 1960) Cecily Hubbard (m. 1965)
- Children: 2, including Margaret Thatcher
- Relatives: Mark Thatcher (grandson); Carol Thatcher (granddaughter)
- Occupation: Greengrocer; local politician; Methodist local preacher

Alfred Roberts JP (18 April 1892 – 10 February 1970) was an English grocer, preacher and local politician. He served Grantham as alderman from 1943 to 1952 and mayor from 1945 to 1946. His second daughter, Margaret, was the first female prime minister of the United Kingdom.

== Early life ==
Roberts was born in Ringstead, a village in Northamptonshire, the fifth of seven children. His father was Benjamin Ebenezer Roberts (28 December 1857 – 17 September 1925), from a Ringstead family, and his mother was Ellen Smith (20 November 1857 – 1 May 1935), whose own mother, Catherine Sullivan, was born at Kenmare in Ireland. At the 1871 census, Benjamin Roberts was a shoemaker's apprentice in Ringstead. At the 1921 census, he was an out-of-work shoemaker.

Roberts initially wanted to become a schoolteacher, but he left school at thirteen to help support his family. He is listed in the 1911 census as a boarder in Oundle, Northamptonshire, working as a grocer's assistant. He later moved to Grantham in Lincolnshire, where he was apprenticed to a greengrocer. When the First World War broke out in 1914, Roberts, "a deeply patriotic man", tried six times to enlist in the British Army, but was rejected because of weak eyesight.

Four years after moving to Grantham, Roberts met Beatrice Ethel Stephenson (1888–1960) through the Finkin Street Methodist Church, which he attended every Sunday. They married in Grantham on 28 May 1917. Their two daughters were also born in Grantham: Muriel Cullen (24 May 1921 – 3 December 2004) and Margaret Thatcher. In 1919, they bought the grocery shop, and in 1923, Roberts opened a second shop.

== Politics ==
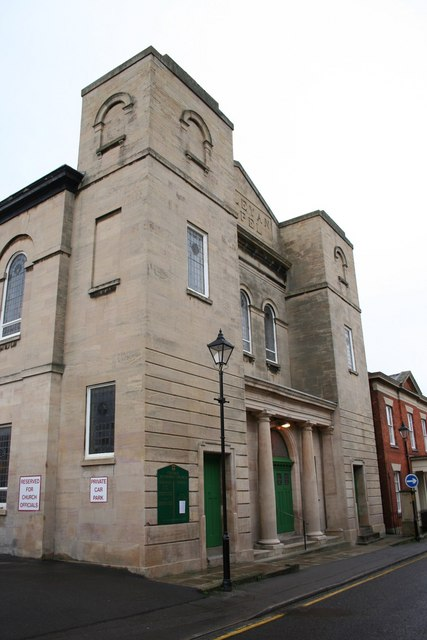
Roberts was a lay preacher at the Finkin Street Wesleyan Chapel (pictured in 2006)

Roberts was an "old-fashioned liberal" who believed strongly in individual responsibility and sound finance. He had read and admired Stuart Mill's On Liberty. He came from a family that traditionally voted Liberal. Still, he believed that the Liberals had embraced collectivism and that the Conservatives stood for the old liberalism. His daughter Muriel recalled that Roberts "was always a Liberal at heart". In the 1935 general election, Roberts helped the local Conservative candidate Victor Warrender to win the Grantham constituency.

In 1927, Roberts was elected to the Grantham urban district council as an independent. He was also a part-time Justice of the Peace, president of the Chamber of Trade, President of Rotary, director of the Grantham Building Society and the Trustee Savings Bank, chairman of the local National Savings Movement, a governor of the local boys' and girls' grammar schools and chairman of the Workers' Educational Association. During the Second World War, he was Chief Welfare Officer, directing civil defence. He soon became Chairman of the Finance and Rating Committee and, in 1943, was elected by the council as Alderman; he served as Mayor of Grantham from November 1945 to 1946, in which he presided over the town's victory celebrations. In his inaugural speech, Roberts called for an extensive programme of expenditure to rebuild the roads, public transport, health and social services for children and to "build houses by the thousand".

External image
- Photo of Roberts laying down his robes as Alderman (voted out by Labour)
- "The picture was published in the paper on 23 May 1952 when Alderman Roberts was voted off the council by the new Labour majority. The event caused great distress to the Roberts family."

On 21 May 1952, Roberts was voted out as alderman by the first Labour majority on the council, and after the vote was taken, he proclaimed: "It is now almost nine years since I took up these robes in honour, and now I trust in honour they are laid down." When his daughter Margaret recalled this event, over thirty years later as prime minister during an interview with Miriam Stoppard, she said that it was "very emotional" and wept on television.

== Personal life ==
Roberts retired and sold his business in 1958 but continued after that to preach and remained active in the Rotary Club. Beatrice died in 1960, aged 72.

On 26 November 1965, Roberts married again; his second wife was Cissie Miriam Hubbard (née Freeston) born in 1896 in Lincolnshire.

In 1997, the satirical magazine Punch published an article by Professor Bernard Crick featuring allegations, including one from an alleged victim, that Roberts had been involved in several sexual assaults on women. Crick had tried to put the allegations into the public domain before both the 1987 and 1997 elections but had been rebuffed by various publications. The article claimed that Roberts was an inspiration for a lecherous character who was a local councillor and grocer in the 1937 satire of Grantham, Rotten Borough. John Campbell, the biographer of his daughter Margaret Thatcher, believes that these allegations were unsubstantiated and dismissed by people who knew him, and that the character in Rotten Borough was a parody of another prominent councillor at the time.

Roberts died at 19 North Parade, Grantham, on 10 February 1970, leaving an estate valued for probate at £8,320, equivalent to £114,115 in 2025.

== In popular culture ==
Roberts appears as a character in the 2008 BBC Four television drama, The Long Walk to Finchley, which depicts Margaret Thatcher's early political career. He is played by Philip Jackson.

He is also portrayed by Iain Glen in The Iron Lady (2011).
