= Scotney Castle =

Country house in Lamberhurst, Kent, England

Coordinates: 51°05′34″N 0°24′30″E

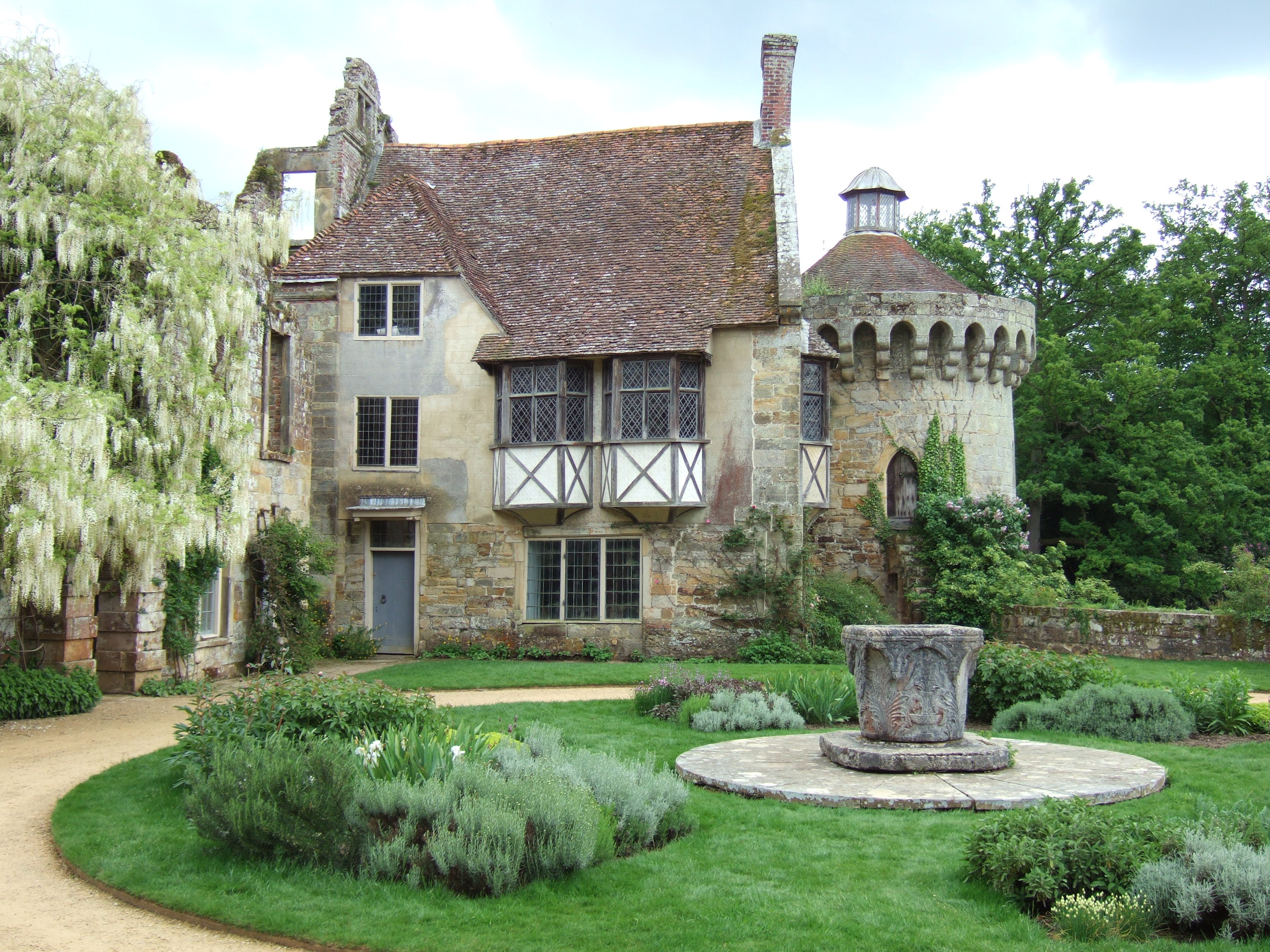
Frontview of the partial Elizabethan wing of old Scotney Castle

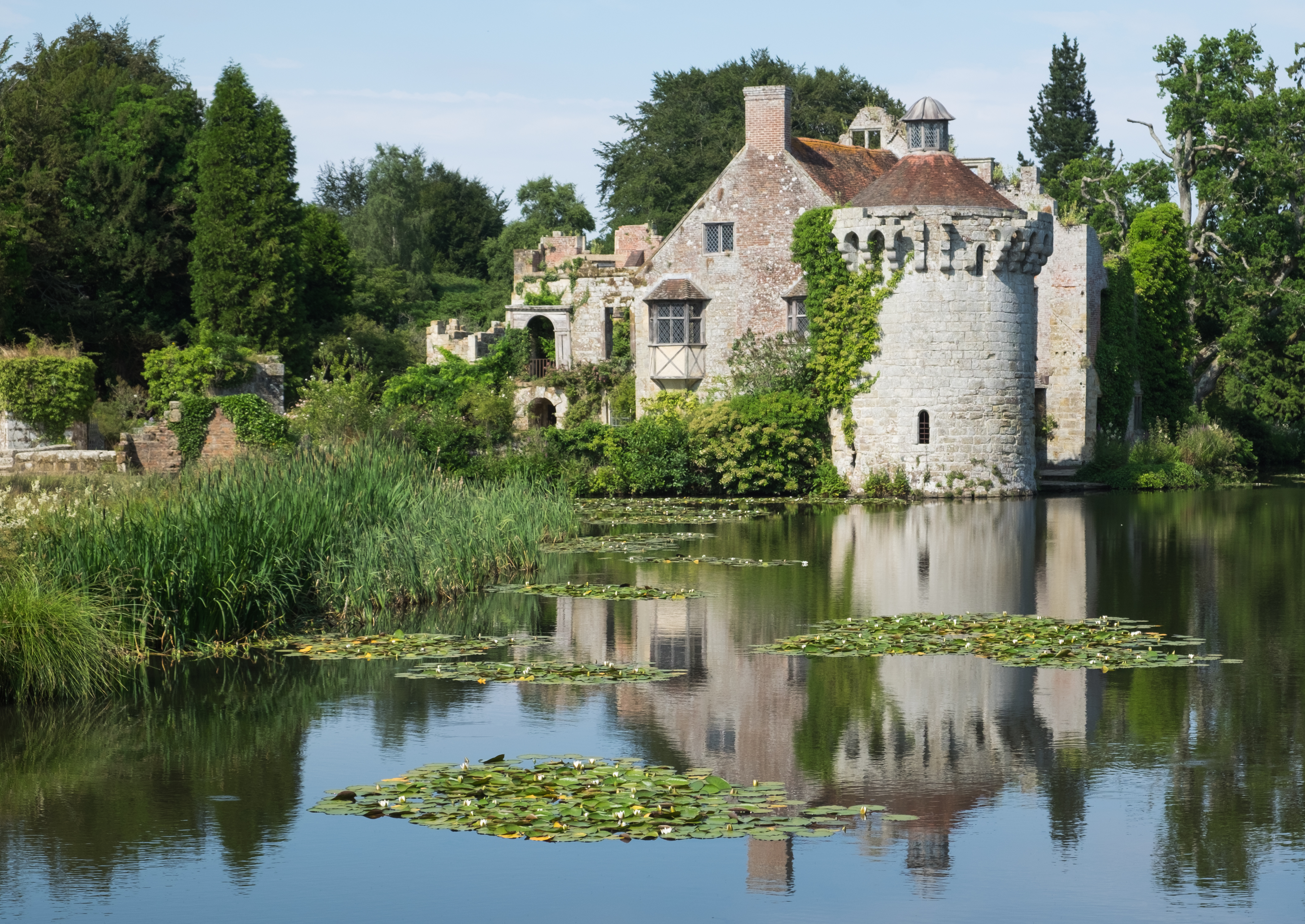
The old castle from the south-west

Scotney Castle is an English country house with formal gardens south-east of Lamberhurst in the valley of the River Bewl in Kent, England. It belongs to the National Trust.

The gardens, which are a Site of Special Scientific Interest and a celebrated example of the picturesque style, are open to the public. The central feature is the ruins of a medieval, moated manor house, Scotney Old Castle, which is on an island on a small lake. The lake is surrounded by sloping, wooded gardens with fine collections of rhododendrons, azaleas and kalmia for spring colour, summer wisteria and roses, and spectacular autumn colour.

At the top of the garden stands a house which was built to replace the Old Castle between 1835 and 1843. This is known as Scotney New Castle, or simply Scotney Castle, and was designed by Anthony Salvin. It is an early and unusually restrained example of Tudor Revival architectural style in 19th-century Britain. Following the death of the resident, Elizabeth Hussey, in 2006, this house was opened to the public for the first time on 6 June 2007.

== Location ==
Scotney Castle is located in South East England, in the county of Kent. Nearby settlements are Lamberhurst and Kilndown, however the nearest large town is Royal Tunbridge Wells 3.5 miles (5.6 km) away. Although the A21 main road passes the grounds, it cannot be seen from the Castle.

== History ==
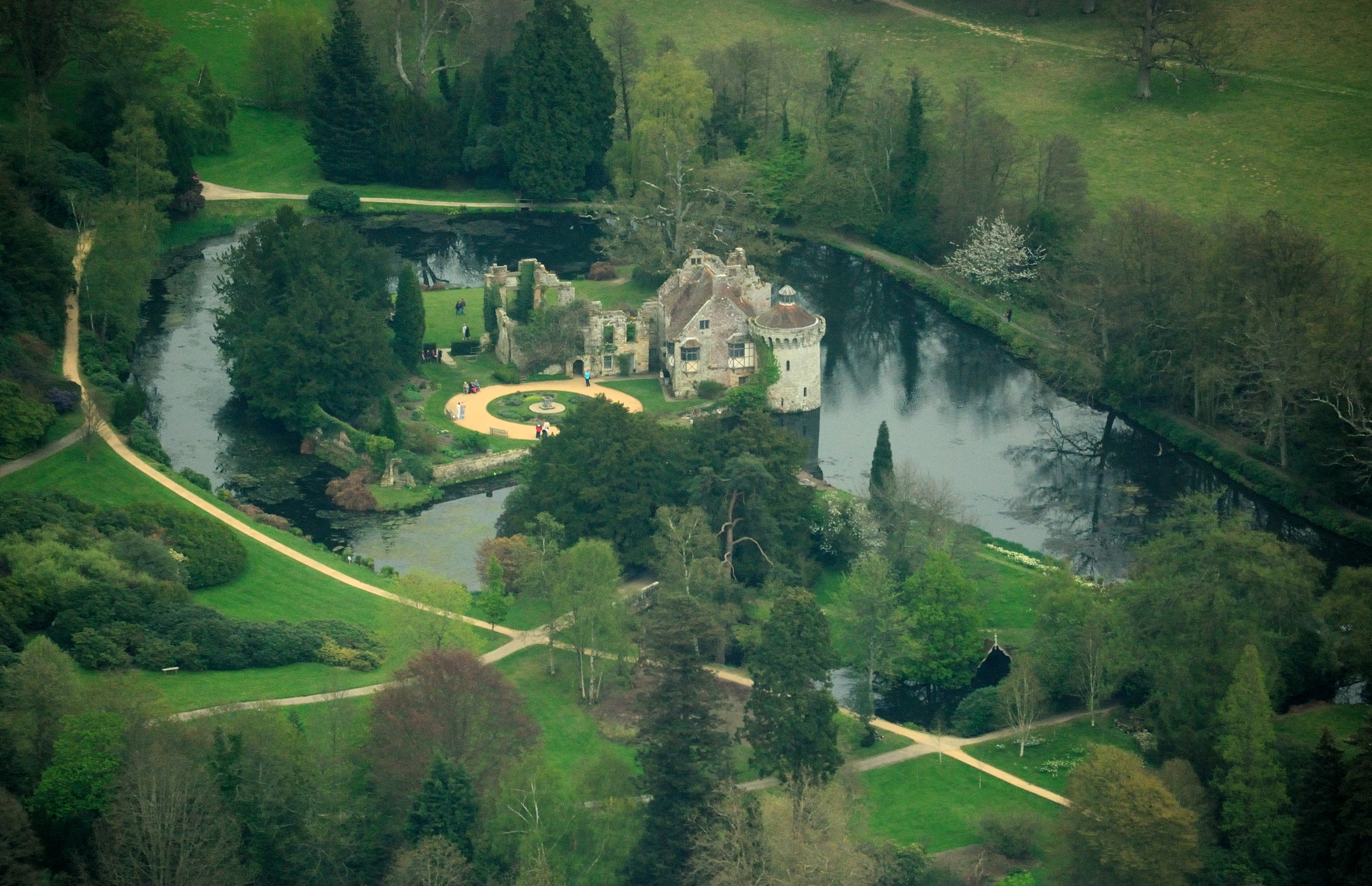
Aerial view of the castle

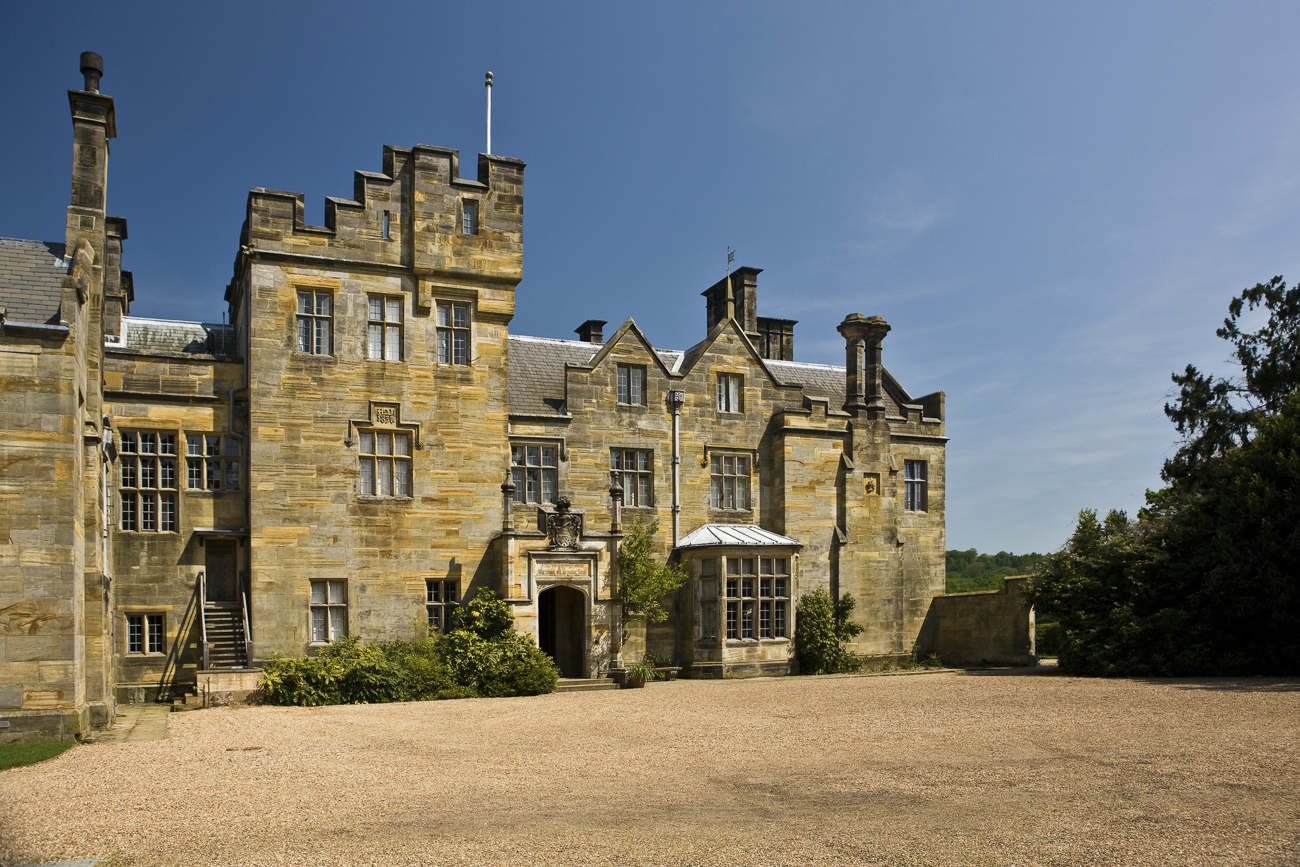
Scotney 'New' Castle

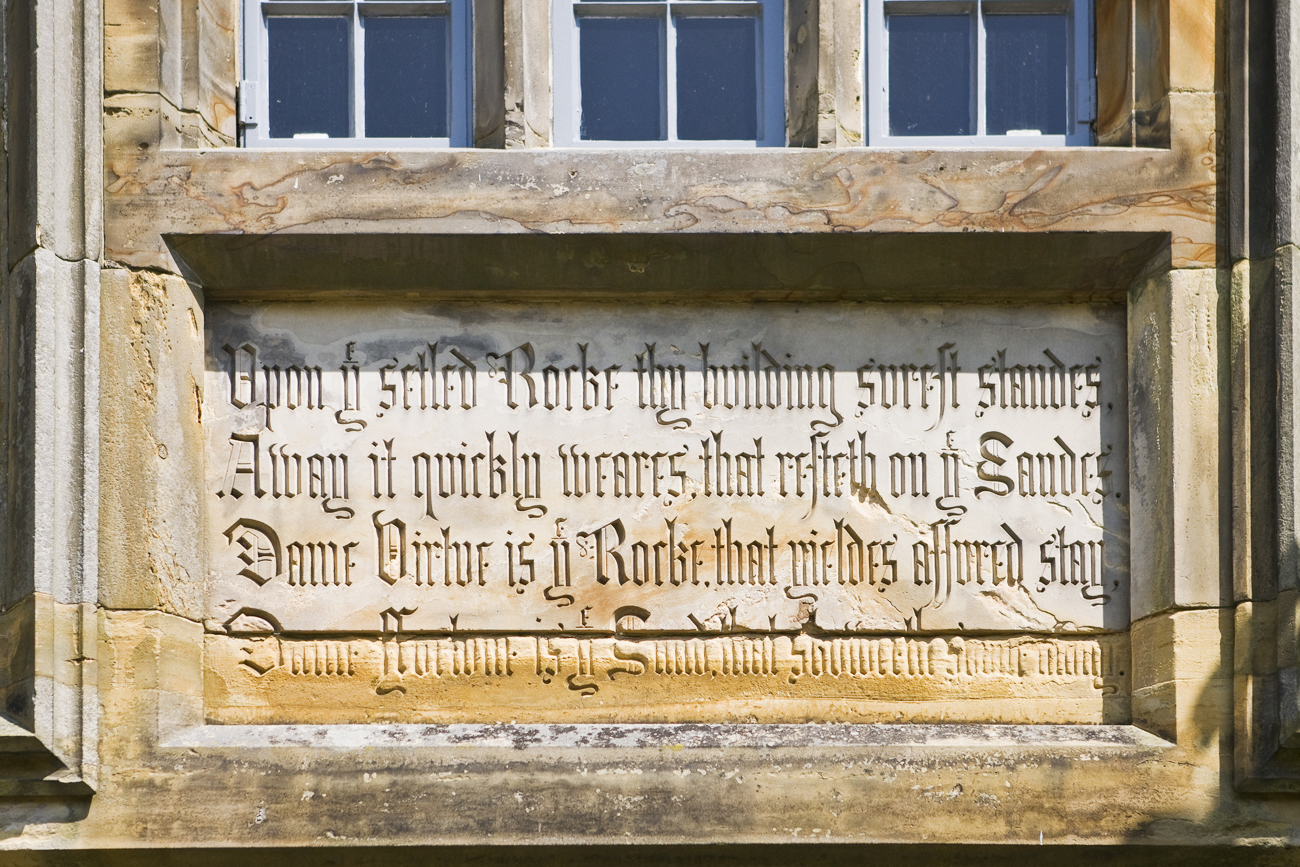
Scotney 'New' Castle

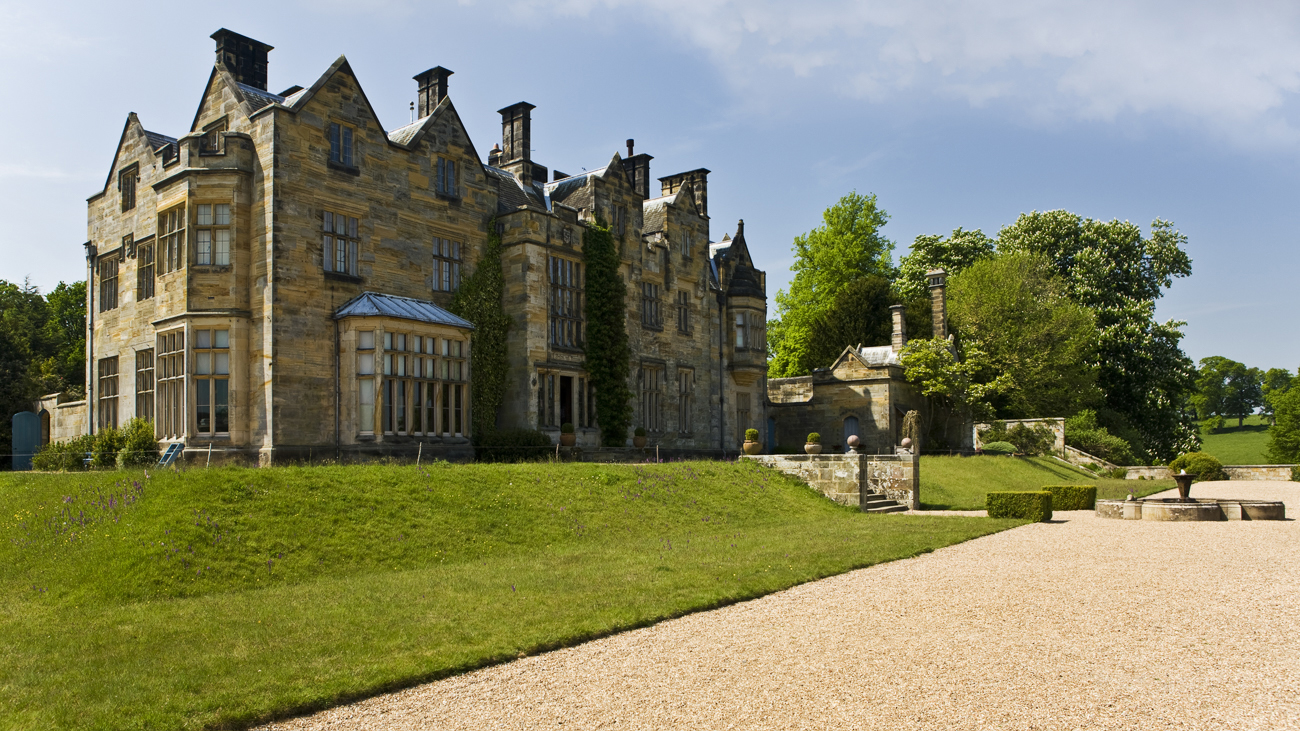
Scotney 'New' Castle

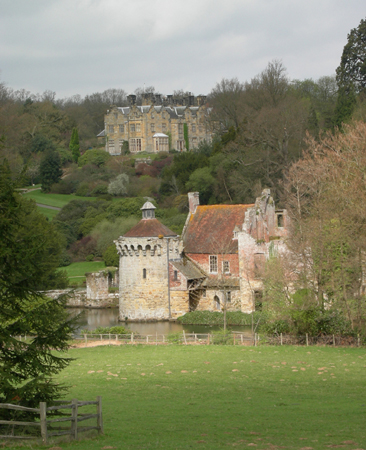
A photograph of the old (foreground) and new castles

The earliest record from 1137 gives the owner of the estate as Lambert de Scoteni. Roger Ashburnham is credited with building the castle c.1378–80.

Construction of the castle began as a roughly rectangular fortified house with towers in each corner. The original plan may never have been finished, and by 1558 it is likely only the southern tower remained. In 1580 the south wing was rebuilt in Elizabethan architecture style, and around 1630 the eastern range was rebuilt in three-story Inigo Jones style. The Elizabethan wing remained a bailiff's residence until 1905, but the eastern range was partly dismantled on the completion of the new house in 1843, leaving the ruin as a garden feature.

The Recusant owner Thomas Darrell hid Jesuit Father Richard Blount, S.J. in the castle while he ministered to Roman Catholics from 1591 to 1598. Catholicism was then illegal in England, and during the second raid by authorities to arrest the priest he fled over a wall into the moat and escaped.

The Darrell family owned the estate for some 350 years. In 1778 Edward Hussey bought the estate and his grandson, also Edward, built the 'new' Castle to the designs of Anthony Salvin, from sandstone quarried from the slope below. The hollow created was developed into a Quarry Garden and contains a 100-million-year-old impression of a dinosaur's footprint.

On Christopher Hussey's death in 1970 the estate was left to the National Trust. Several apartments in the castle and on the estate were let out by the Trust, with tenants including Prime Minister Margaret Thatcher who rented the Belfry flat for a time during the 1970s and 1980s, when it served as a weekend escape for her from Westminster life. When her husband Denis Thatcher was made a baronet in 1990, his new title was gazetted with the territorial designation of Scotney in the County of Kent.

The castle grounds have played host to Shakespeare productions, notably A Midsummer Night's Dream, with the actors appearing from behind the bushes on cue.

Old Scotney Castle was used as the location for the video to the Squeeze song Some Fantastic Place.

== See also ==
- Castles in Great Britain and Ireland
- List of castles in England
