= Rotten Borough (novel) =

1937 novel by Oliver Anderson

- Author: Julian Pine
- Publication date: 1937

Rotten Borough (ISBN 0947795839) was a book published in 1937 by the British writer Oliver Anderson, using the pseudonym Julian Pine. Withdrawn soon after release, it was republished in 1989.

The book is a satirical novel based on the author's observations of life in the town of Grantham, where he was educated. On release, it caused a national controversy and threats of libel actions in Britain because of the perception that its characters were based on real people, including Lord Brownlow, a friend of King Edward VIII who had also served as mayor of Grantham. The book was withdrawn after three weeks.

The book received renewed public attention in the 1980s, because another character in the book, Councillor Nurture, was thought to be based on Alfred Roberts, the father of Prime Minister Margaret Thatcher, although Anderson denied this. The book was republished in 1989.

John Campbell, in his biography of Margaret Thatcher, described the novel as a dated and juvenile lampoon of small-town life, and believed that Councillor Nurture was actually based on Councillor Foster, another prominent Grantham councillor at the time.
