= Archdeacon of Pontefract =

Church of England ecclesiastical office

The Archdeacon of Pontefract is a senior ecclesiastical officer within the Diocese of Leeds.

As Archdeacon she or he is responsible for the disciplinary supervision of the clergy within the five area deaneries of Dewsbury, Wakefield, Pontefract, Barnsley and Birstall.

== History ==
The Archdeaconry was founded (from the Archdeaconry of Craven in the Diocese of Ripon) with the erection of the Diocese of Wakefield on 20 November 1888. From then until its reorganisation in 1927, the archdeaconry of Halifax comprised the northwestern corner of that diocese. In 1927, the archdeaconry was renamed to that of Pontefract and its borders moved to cover the eastern half of the diocese (the Huddersfield archdeaconry became the new archdeaconry of Halifax).

For many years the post of Archdeacon of Pontefract was combined with that of Bishop suffragan of Pontefract. The current incumbent is Peter Townley. Since the creation of the Diocese of Leeds on 20 April 2014, the archdeaconry has formed the Wakefield episcopal area.

== List of archdeacons ==
Archdeacons of Halifax

- 1888–1906 (d.): Ingham Brooke
- 1906–1917 (res.): William Foxley Norris
- 1917–29 November 1923 (d.): Henry Walsham How
- 1923–1927: Richard Phipps (became Archdeacon of Pontefract)

In the diocesan reorganisation of 1927, the archdeaconry was renamed to Pontefract. (For Archdeacons of Halifax after 1927, see Archdeacon of Halifax.)
Archdeacons of Pontefract

- 1927–1930 (ret.): Richard Phipps (previously Archdeacon of Halifax)
- 1931–1938 (res.): Campbell Hone, Bishop suffragan of Pontefract
- 1938–1949 (res.): Tom Longworth, Bishop suffragan of Pontefract
- 1946–1954 (res.): Arthur Morris, Bishop suffragan of Pontefract
- 1954–1961 (res.): George Clarkson, Bishop suffragan of Pontefract
- 1961–1968 (res.): Eric Treacy, Bishop suffragan of Pontefract
- 1968–1981 (ret.): Edward Henderson (afterwards archdeacon emeritus)
- 1981–1992 (ret.): Ken Unwin (afterwards archdeacon emeritus)
- 1992–1997 (res.): John Flack
- 1997–2003 (res.): Tony Robinson
- 2003–2007 (res.): Jonathan Greener
- 2007–2023: Peter Townley (resigned effective 25 September 2023 to resume parish ministry)
- 5 May 2024 – present: Cat Thatcher
