= Henry Walsham How =

The Ven Henry Walsham How (born Whittington, Shropshire 17 May 1856 – died Malvern Link 29 November 1923) was Archdeacon of Halifax from 1917 until his death.

== Life ==
The son of William Walsham How, the inaugural Bishop of Wakefield, he was educated at Marlborough College, Wadham College, Oxford and Leeds Clergy School. He was ordained deacon in 1879, and priest in 1880.

After curacies in Stoke-on-Trent and Haughton; How held incumbencies in Mirfield and Meltham. He was Rural Dean of Huddersfield from 1905 to 1917 and a Canon of Wakefield Cathedral from 1917 to 1923.

== Family ==
On 4 August 1886 How married Katharine Hutchinson, daughter of the Rev. William Hutchinson, vicar of Blurton. The couple had three sons and one daughter. The sons were:

- William Henry Walsham How (born 1887), cleric
- Douglas Walsham How (1889–1942), official in Basutoland
- Robert Walsham How (born 1891)

Their daughter Rachel Walsham How (born 1887) married in 1915 the Rev. William Prescott-Decie (1867–1927).

Church of England titles
Preceded by William Foxley Norris	Archdeacon of Halifax; 1917–1923	Succeeded by Richard Phipps
