= Dawtry =

Dawtry is a surname. Notable people with the surname include:

- Alan Dawtry (1915–2018), British civil servant
- Anne Dawtry (born 1957), Anglican priest
- Kevin Dawtry (1958–2025), English footballer

== See also ==
- Daughtry (disambiguation)
