= Herr, mach uns stark =

Christian hymn

- Christian hymn
- Occasion: End of the church year
- Written: 1972
- Text: by Anna Martina Gottschick
- Language: German
- Melody: "Sine Nomine" by Ralph Vaughan Williams
- Composed: 1906

"Herr, mach uns stark" (Lord, make us strong) is a Christian hymn in German with text by Anna Martina Gottschick written in 1972. The hymn for the end of the church year is sung to the melody "Sine Nomine" by Ralph Vaughan Williams . It is contained in the Catholic hymnal Gotteslob, concluded with an added sixth stanza by Jürgen Henkys. The first line is "Herr, mach uns stark im Mut, der dich bekennt" (Lord, make us strong in courage to confess you).

== History ==
"Herr, mach uns stark" was written by Anna Martina Gottschick (1914–1995) in 1972. Gottschick grew up in a Protestant pastor's house and became a journalist. As the composer Heinz Werner Zimmermann had suggested, she wrote the text to match the 1906 melody "Sine Nomine" by Ralph Vaughan Williams used popular in "For All the Saints", to make that melody available to German church singing. While "For All the Saints" is a hymn for All Saints' Day with text by Bishop William Walsham How, "Herr, mach uns stark" is a hymn for the end of the church year. The English hymn has three lines that rhyme, and a refrain of the word Halleluja, twice.

The poetry expresses a longing for a different world, painting this world as a field of death (Totenfeld), in a wording taken from Ezekiel 37:1–10. Her concept had this description first, followed by three stanzas, all based on biblical motifs, that ended in a prayer for strength and courage to confess. Gottschick wrote in a 1987 letter that she thought of the Ten virgins, to whom Nicolai's hymn "Wachet auf, ruft uns die Stimme" also refers, rather than of saints. The commission for the Protestant hymnal Evangelisches Gesangbuch, however, used her final stanza also for an opening, before her original first stanza. They concluded the hymn with an added sixths stanza by Jürgen Henkys, who translated in 1988 a stanza from the English hymn.

The hymn is contained in the Protestant hymnal as EG 154, in the Catholic hymnal Gotteslob, the same version is GL 552.
