= Richard Phipps =

The Ven Richard Phipps (26 May 1865 in Northampton [bap 1 August 1865] – 5 October 1934 in Harrogate) was Archdeacon of Halifax from 1923 to 1927; and then, when it was renamed, of Pontefract from 1927 to 1930.

Phipps was educated at Dover College; Clare College, Cambridge; and Wells Theological College. Ordained in 1890, he served curacies in Great Yarmouth and Wakefield. He was Diocesan Chaplain of Wakefield from 1894 to 1896; Vicar of Brighouse from 1896 to 1901; and then of Kirkburton from 1901. A freemason, he was Grand Chaplain of England in 1926. He was a Member of West Riding County Council from 1913 to 1928.

Church of England titles
Preceded by Jonathan Desmond Francis Greener	Archdeacon of Halifax; 1923–1927	Succeeded by Campbell Richard Hone
