= Malcolm Chamberlain =

The Right Reverend Malcolm Chamberlain
- Bishop of Wakefield
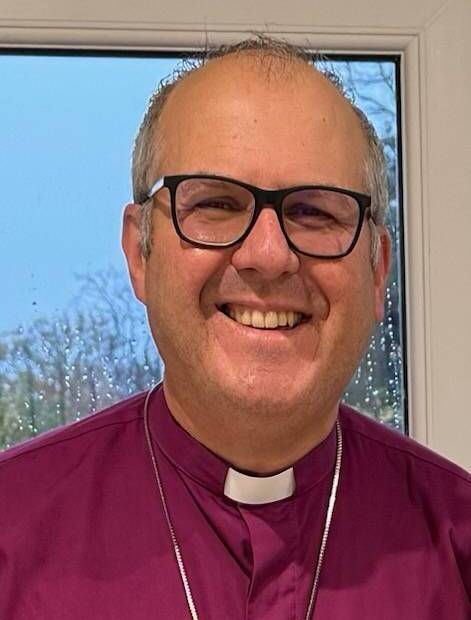
- Malcolm Chamberlain in 2025
- Church: Church of England
- Diocese: Diocese of Leeds
- In office: 2025 to present
- Predecessor: Tony Robinson
- Previous post: Archdeacon of Sheffield and Rotherham (2014–2025)

Orders
- Ordination: 1996 (deacon); 1997 (priest)
- Consecration: 11 June 2025 by Stephen Cottrell

Personal details
- Born: 1 December 1969 (age 56)
- Denomination: Anglicanism
- Education: University of York; Wycliffe Hall, Oxford; University of Liverpool

Malcolm Leslie Chamberlain (born 1 December 1969) is a British Anglican bishop. Since 2025, he has been the Bishop of Wakefield, a suffragan bishop in the Church of England's Diocese of Leeds. He was the Archdeacon of Sheffield and Rotherham in the Diocese of Sheffield from 2014 to 2025.

== Early life and education ==
Chamberlain was born on 1 December 1969 in Newmarket, Suffolk, England. He was educated at Beauchamp College in Oadby, Leicestershire. He studied economics and education at the University of York, graduating with a Bachelor of Arts (BA) degree in 1992. From 1992 to 1993, he was a mission partner with the Church Mission Society in Peshawar, Pakistan. He then trained for ordination at Wycliffe Hall, Oxford, graduating with a Bachelor of Theology (BTh) degree from the University of Oxford in 1996. He later studied pastoral theology at the University of Liverpool, graduating with a Master of Philosophy (MPhil) degree in 2011.

== Ordained ministry ==
Chamberlain was ordained in the Church of England as a deacon in 1996 and as a priest in 1997. After serving his curacy in the Diocese of Liverpool, he was an associate minister at St Matthew and St James, Mossley Hill from 1999 to 2002. He was Anglican chaplain to the University of Liverpool from 2002 to 2007. From 2008 to 2014, he led St Mary's Church, Wavertree; first as priest-in-charge and then rector. He additionally served as area dean of Toxteth and Wavertree between 2012 and 2014.

In 2014, Chamberlain was appointed Archdeacon of Sheffield and Rotherham in the Diocese of Sheffield. He has been an elected member of the General Synod since 2015. He has also been a member of the church's Mission and Public Affairs Council since 2016: the council overseas "research and comment on social and political issues on behalf of the Church".

On 19 March 2025, he was announced as the next Bishop of Wakefield, a suffragan bishop in the Diocese of Leeds. He was consecrated as a bishop on 11 June 2025 by Stephen Cottrell, Archbishop of York, during a service at York Minster.

=== Views ===
In 2023, Chamberlain became a founding convener of Inclusive Evangelicals, a network which champions a "biblical affirmation of equality and inclusivity", including support for same-sex relationships.
