= Richard Hare (bishop) =

Thomas Richard Hare (29 August 1922 – 18 July 2010) was the Suffragan Bishop of Pontefract from 1971 until 1992.

== Life ==
He was born on 29 August 1922 and educated at Marlborough College and Trinity College, Oxford. After World War II service with the RAF he was ordained in 1950 and began his ecclesiastical career with a curacy at Haltwhistle. Following this he was chaplain to the Bishop of Manchester and then a canon residentiary at Carlisle Cathedral. Appointed Archdeacon of Westmorland and Furness in 1965, he was appointed to the episcopate seven years later and retired in 1992.

Church of England titles
Preceded by Gordon Fallows	Bishop of Pontefract; 1971–1992	Succeeded by John Thornley Finney
