= Campbell Hone =

British Anglican bishop (1873–1967)

- Bishop of Wakefield
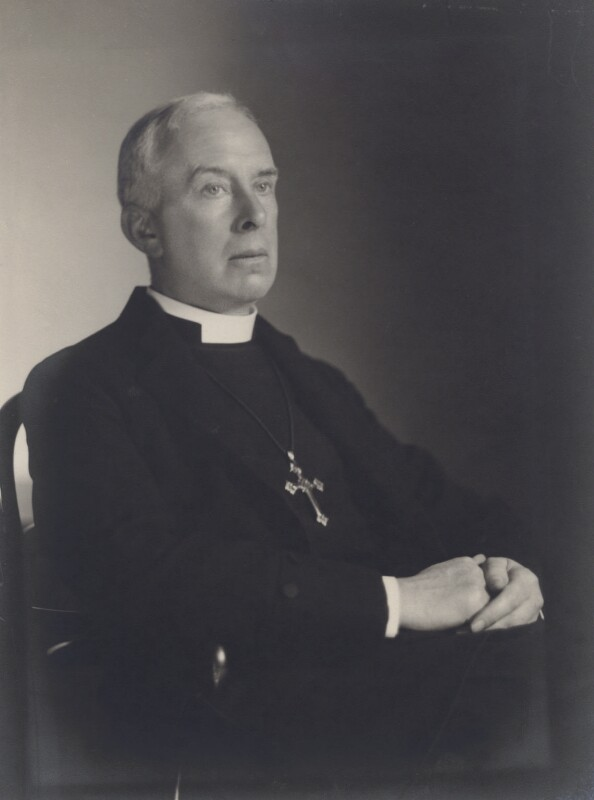
- Hone c. 1930s
- Diocese: Diocese of Wakefield
- In office: 1938–1945
- Predecessor: James Seaton
- Successor: Henry McGowan
- Other posts: Archdeacon of Pontefract, Canon of Wakefield and Bishop of Pontefract (1931–1938)

Orders
- Ordination: 1898
- Consecration: c. 1931

Personal details
- Born: 13 September 1873
- Died: 16 May 1967 (aged 93)
- Denomination: Anglican
- Parents: Evelyn (a priest)
- Spouse: Emily née Weaver
- Children: one son, two daughters
- Education: Wadham College, Oxford

Campbell Richard Hone (13 September 1873 – 16 May 1967) was an eminent Anglican bishop in the second quarter of the 20th century.

== Early life ==
He was born into an ecclesiastical family – his father was Evelyn J. Hone (of the Anglo-Irish Hone family), sometime Vicar of Esher – educated at Blackheath Proprietary School and Wadham College, Oxford and ordained in 1898.

== Priestly career ==
After a period as Curate at Holy Trinity, Habergham Eaves (1898–1902), he was appointed Domestic Chaplain to Rodney Eden, Bishop of Wakefield (1902–1905). From 1905 to 1909 he was Vice Principal of Leeds Clergy School, becoming additionally an Examining Chaplain to Eden as Bishop of Wakefield (1907–1928); after Leeds, he was Vicar of Pellon (1909–1915) and then of Brighouse (1916–1920), during which time he became also an honorary canon of Wakefield Cathedral (1918–1920). In 1920 he crossed over to the Diocese of York, becoming Rector of Whitby (1920–1930) and a Prebendary of York Minster (1926–1930), and serving that diocese as a Proctor in Convocation (1925–1930).

== Episcopal career ==
In 1931, he was appointed to return to Wakefield diocese to be simultaneously: Archdeacon of Pontefract, a canon residentiary of Wakefield Cathedral, and the first Bishop suffragan of Pontefract, appointed to assist James Seaton, diocesan Bishop of Wakefield. He was ordained a bishop by William Temple, Archbishop of York, in York Minster on the Purification of the Blessed Virgin (2 February) 1931; among the bishops co-consecrators were Seaton; Eden (the previous Bishop of Wakefield); George Frodsham, Vicar of Halifax and former Bishop of North Queensland; Lucius Smith, Bishop of Knaresborough; Atherton Rawstorne, Bishop of Whalley; Henry Woollcombe, Bishop of Whitby; and Bernard Heywood, assistant bishop in York and a former Bishop of Southwell; and Hugh Bright, Archdeacon of Stafford preached. When Seaton died during the 1938 jubilee celebrations of their diocese's erection in 1888, Temple commissioned Hone to act up as diocesan bishop, and he was soon chosen to succeed Seaton and translated to the diocesan See of Wakefield. He retired in 1945.

== Family, honours and pursuits ==
Hone married Emily, a daughter of a physician named F. P. Weaver, and they had two sons and two daughters. He was made an honorary fellow of his alma mater, Wadham, in 1939; wrote a Life of Dr John Radcliffe, 1652–1714 (published 1950); and gained a Doctor of Divinity (DD) degree from Lambeth. At his death, he resided at North Oxford.

In September 1939, Hone's daughter Margaret Evelyn married J. M. Bruce Lockhart, a schoolmaster and later an intelligence officer, and they had two sons and a daughter: James Bruce Lockhart (born 1941), Alexander (Sandy) Bruce-Lockhart, Baron Bruce-Lockhart (1942–2008), and Sarah Bruce Lockhart (born 1955). His great-grandchildren include the actor Dugald Bruce Lockhart.

Church of England titles
New title	Bishop of Pontefract; 1931–1938	Succeeded by Tom Longworth
Preceded by James Seaton	Bishop of Wakefield; 1938–1945	Succeeded by Henry McGowan
