= Edward Henderson (archdeacon) =

The Ven Edward Chance Henderson (15 October 1916 – 24 September 1997) was Archdeacon of Pontefract from 1968 to 1981.

Townley was born in Newcastle upon Tyne and educated at Heaton Grammar School and the University of London. He was ordained Deacon in 1939, and Priest in 1940. After a curacy in Newcastle upon Tyne he was Organising Secretary of the Church Pastoral Aid Society from 1942 to 1945. He held incumbencies in Leeds, Halifax, Dewsbury and Darrington.

Church of England titles
Preceded by Eric Treacy	Archdeacon of Pontefract; 1968–1981	Succeeded by Ken Unwin
