= William Donne =

William Donne may refer to:

- William Donne (cricketer) (1875–1934), English cricketer
- William Donne (priest) (1845–1914), British clergyman
- William Bodham Donne (1807–1882), English journalist

== See also ==
- William Done (1815–1895), English organist
