= John Finney (disambiguation) =

John Finney may refer to:

- John Miller Turpin Finney (1863–1942), American surgeon and academic
- Jack Finney (footballer), (John Finney, 1880–1940), English footballer, see List of Bury F.C. players (1–24 appearances)
- Jack Finney (John Finney, 1911–1995), American Writer, also known as Walter Braden Finney
- John Finney (born 1932), eighth Suffragan Bishop of Pontefract
