= For All the Saints =

Christian hymn

- Hymn
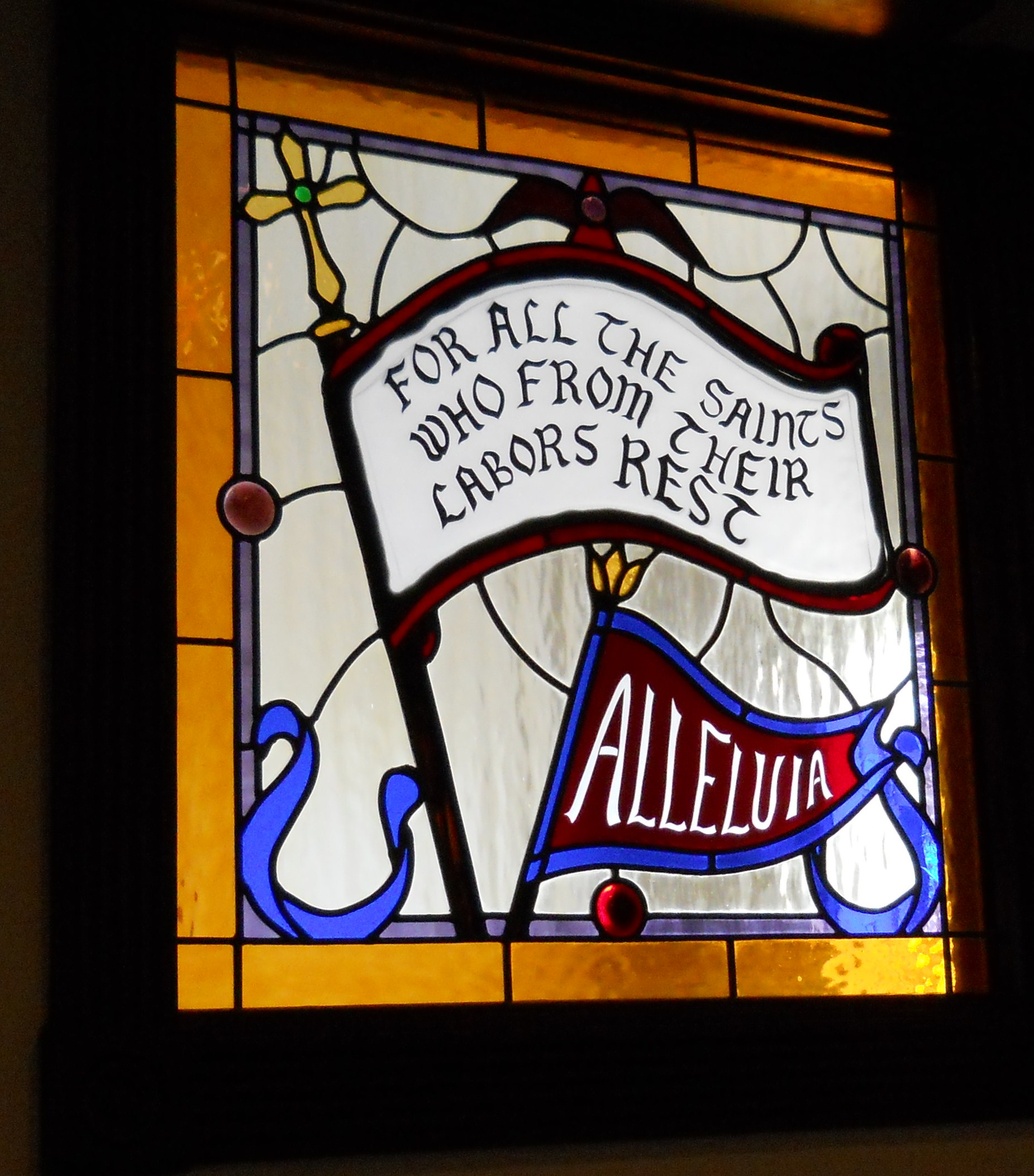
- For All the Saints stained glass at All Saints Episcopal Church, Jensen Beach, Florida
- Occasion: All Saints' Day
- Text: by William Walsham How
- Based on: Hebrews 12:1
- Meter: 10.10.10.4
- Melody: "Sarum" by Joseph Barnby; "Sine Nomine" by Ralph Vaughan Williams; "Engleberg" by Charles Villiers Stanford
- Composed: 1906 ("Sine nomine")
- Published: 1864

"For All the Saints" is a Christian hymn written by Walsham How and set to music by Ralph Vaughan Williams and others. The hymn was first printed in Hymns for Saints' Days, and Other Hymns, by Earl Nelson, 1864.

== Tune ==
The hymn was sung to the melody Sarum, by the Victorian composer Joseph Barnby, until the publication of the English Hymnal in 1906. This hymnal used a new setting by Ralph Vaughan Williams which he called Sine Nomine (literally, "without name") in reference to its use on the Feast of All Saints, 1 November (or the first Sunday in November, All Saints Sunday among some Lutheran church bodies or those congregations whose membership makes weekday services infeasible). It has been described as "one of the finest hymn tunes of the [20th] century."

Although most English hymn tunes of its era are written for singing in SATB four-part harmony, Sine Nomine is primarily unison (verses 1,2,3,7 and 8) with organ accompaniment; three verses (4, 5 and 6) are set in sung harmony. The tune appears in this forms in most English hymnbooks (for example English Hymnal (641), New English Hymnal (197), Common Praise (232)) and American hymnals (for example, The Hymnal 1982 and the Lutheran Service Book (677)).

Since the 1990s, some Presbyterian churches and groups affiliated with Reformed University Fellowship in the United States use a tune composed by Christopher Miner.

Charles Villiers Stanford's tune Engelberg was also written to be partnered with this hymn, although in the wake of Sine nomine it never gained popularity and is now more commonly used with other hymns, including "When in Our Music God is Glorified."

== Text ==
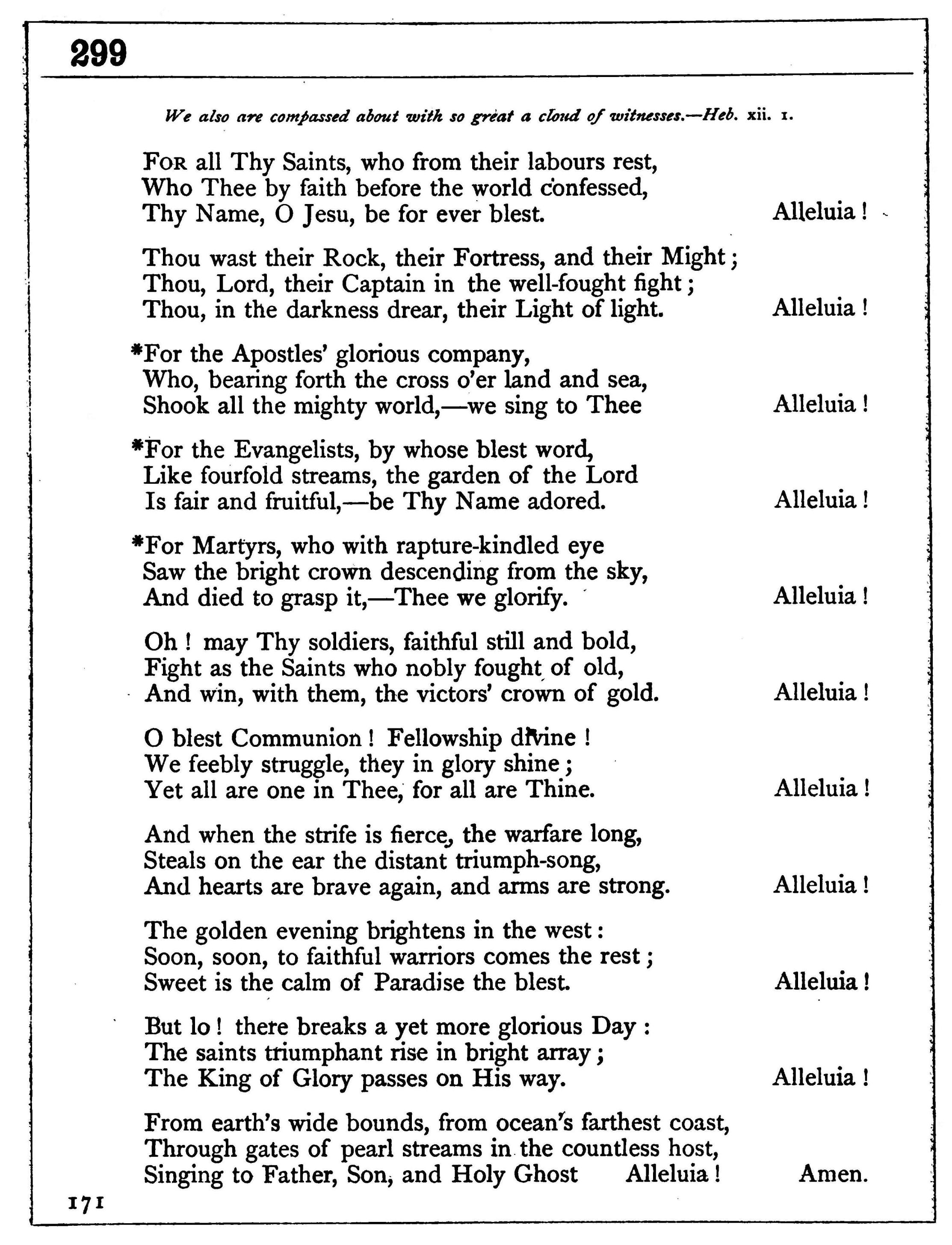
"For All Thy Saints" (Sarum Hymnal, 1868)

1. For all the saints, who from their labours rest,
Who Thee by faith before the world confessed,
Thy Name, O Jesu, be forever blessed.
Alleluia, Alleluia!

2. Thou wast their Rock, their Fortress and their Might;
Thou, Lord, their Captain in the well fought fight;
Thou, in the darkness drear, their one true Light.
Alleluia, Alleluia!

3. For the Apostles’ glorious company,
Who bearing forth the Cross o’er land and sea,
Shook all the mighty world, we sing to Thee:
Alleluia, Alleluia!

4. O may Thy soldiers, faithful, true and bold,
Fight as the saints who nobly fought of old,
And win with them the victor’s crown of gold.
Alleluia, Alleluia!

5. For the Evangelists, by whose blest word,
Like fourfold streams, the garden of the Lord,
Is fair and fruitful, be Thy Name adored.
Alleluia, Alleluia!

6. For Martyrs, who with rapture-kindled eye,
Saw the bright crown descending from the sky,
And seeing, grasped it, Thee we glorify.
Alleluia, Alleluia!

7. O blest communion, fellowship divine!
We feebly struggle, they in glory shine;
Yet all are one in Thee, for all are Thine.
Alleluia, Alleluia!

8. And when the strife is fierce, the warfare long,
Steals on the ear the distant triumph song,
And hearts are brave, again, and arms are strong.
Alleluia, Alleluia!

9. The golden evening brightens in the west;
Soon, soon to faithful warriors comes their rest;
Sweet is the calm of paradise the blessed.
Alleluia, Alleluia!

10. But lo! there breaks a yet more glorious day;
The saints triumphant rise in bright array;
The King of glory passes on His way.
Alleluia, Alleluia!

11. From earth’s wide bounds, from ocean’s farthest coast,
Through gates of pearl streams in the countless host,
Singing to Father, Son and Holy Ghost:
Alleluia, Alleluia!

Some versions substitute "far off we hear" for "steals on the ear" (verse 8). There are other minor variations as well. Most renditions omit verses 3, 5 and 6.

== Use in German ==
On a request by German composer Heinz Werner Zimmermann, Anna Martina Gottschick wrote a hymn "Herr, mach uns stark" (Lord make us strong [in courage to confess you]) to the "Sine nomine" tune in 1972, because the composer wanted to make it available for German church singing. Her hymn is intended for the end of the liturgical year. The version in German Protestant and Catholic hymnals closes with a stanza which Jürgen Henkys translated from "For All the Saints".
