= David Smith (bishop) =

English Anglican bishop (1935–2024)

The Right Reverend David Smith
- Bishop of Bradford
- Diocese: Diocese of Bradford
- In office: 1992–2002
- Predecessor: Roy Williamson
- Successor: David James
- Other posts: Archdeacon of Lindisfarne (1981–1987); Bishop of Maidstone (1987–1992); Bishop to the Forces (1990–1992); Honorary assistant bishop in York and Europe (2002–2024)

Orders
- Ordination: c. 1959 (deacon); c. 1960 (priest)
- Consecration: 6 June 1987

Personal details
- Born: 14 July 1935 Hertfordshire, England
- Died: 28 January 2024 (aged 88)
- Denomination: Anglican
- Parents: Stanley & Gwendolen Smith
- Spouse: Mary Moult (m. 1961)
- Children: One son, one daughter
- Education: King's College London

Member of the House of Lords
- Lord Spiritual
- Bishop of Bradford; 25 November 1997 – 31 July 2002

David James Smith (14 July 1935 – 28 January 2024) was an English Anglican clergyman who was Bishop of Bradford from 1992 to 2002.

== Biography ==
Born in Hertfordshire on 14 July 1935, he was educated at Hertford Grammar School (now Richard Hale School) and King's College London. He was ordained in 1959.

His first post was as an assistant curate at All Saints' Gosforth, after which he became the assistant curate of St Francis High Heaton. Following this, he was Priest in Charge St Mary Magdalene, Longbenton and then Vicar of Longhirst with Hebron. He next became Vicar of St Mary's Monkseaton. He was subsequently the Rural Dean of Tynemouth and, in 1981, was collated Archdeacon of Lindisfarne. In 1987, he was ordained to the episcopate as Bishop of Maidstone and was translated in 1992 to be the Bishop of Bradford (until 2002). From 1990 to 1992, he was also Bishop to the Forces.

Smith was a member of the House of Lords from 1997 to 2002. In retirement, he continued to serve as an honorary assistant bishop in the Diocese of York and Diocese of Europe.

Smith was a Fellow of King's College London (FKC) and, in 2001, was awarded an Honorary Doctorate (DUniv) from the University of Bradford.

Smith was married to Mary and had a son and a daughter. He died on 28 January 2024, at the age of 88.

Church of England titles
Preceded by Robert Hardy	Bishop of Maidstone; 1987–1992	Succeeded by Gavin Reid
Preceded by Ronald Gordon	Bishop to the Forces; 1990–1992	Succeeded by John Kirkham
Preceded by Roy Williamson	Bishop of Bradford; 1992–2002	Succeeded by David James
