= Bishop of Wakefield (diocese) =

Diocese of Wakefield in the Province of York, England

The Bishop of Wakefield was the ordinary of the now-defunct Church of England Diocese of Wakefield in the Province of York. The diocese was based in Wakefield in West Yorkshire, covering the City of Wakefield, Barnsley, Kirklees and Calderdale. The see was centred in the City of Wakefield where the bishop's seat (cathedra) was located in the Cathedral Church of All Saints, a parish church elevated to cathedral status in 1888.

The diocesan bishop's residence was Bishop's Lodge, Wakefield. The office existed from the founding of the diocese in 1888 under Queen Victoria until its dissolution on 20 April 2014. The cathedral contains a memorial to Walsham How, first Bishop of Wakefield. The last diocesan Bishop of Wakefield was Stephen Platten, the 12th Bishop of Wakefield, who signed +Stephen Wakefield and was in post when his diocese was dissolved.

Upon the creation of the Diocese of Leeds on 20 April 2014, the see was dissolved and its territory added to the new diocese, within which the suffragan see of Pontefract has since been translated to the area Bishop of Wakefield.

Bishops of Wakefield
From	Until	Incumbent	Notes
1889	1897	William Walsham How	Translated from Bedford. Nominated on 26 May 1888. Died in office on 10 August 1897.
1897	1928	Rodney Eden	Translated from Dover. Nominated on 29 October 1897. Retired in 1928 and died on 7 January 1940.
1928	1938	James Seaton	Nominated on 15 October 1928 and consecrated on 1 November 1928. Died in office on 26 May 1938.
1938	1945	Campbell Hone	Translated from Pontefract. Nominated on 19 August 1938. Retired on 15 September 1945 and died on 16 May 1967.
1946	1948	Henry McGowan	Previously Archdeacon of Aston. Nominated on 13 November 1945 and consecrated on 2 February 1946. Died on office on 8 September 1948
1949	1958	Roger Wilson	Previously Archdeacon of Nottingham. Nominated on 8 March 1949 and consecrated on 25 April 1949. Translated to Chichester on 16 April 1958.
1958	1967	John Ramsbotham	Translated from Jarrow. Nominated 22 April 1958. Retired on 30 November 1967 and died on 16 December 1989.
1968	1976	Eric Treacy	Translated from Pontefract. Nominated on 30 January 1968 and confirmed on 8 March 1968. Retired on 30 September 1976 and died on 13 May 1978.
1977	1985	Colin James	Translated from Basingstoke. Nominated on 30 November 1976 and confirmed on 7 January 1977. Translated to Winchester in 1985.
1985	1992	David Hope	Translated to London. Afterwards translated to York.
1992	2002	Nigel McCulloch	Translated from Taunton. Afterwards translated to Manchester.
2003	2014	Stephen Platten	Previously Dean of Norwich. He was the last diocesan Bishop of Wakefield; his see was dissolved on 20 April 2014.

== Assistant bishops ==
Among those who have served as assistant bishops in the diocese were:

- 1924: Rupert Mounsey CR, former Bishop of Labuan and Sarawak (1909–1916)
- 1967 – 1975 (d.): Victor Shearburn CR, former Bishop of Rangoon
- 1981–1985: Patrick Harris, Rector of Kirkheaton, former Bishop of Northern Argentina (later Bishop of Southwell)

== Sources ==
- Fryde, E. B.; Greenway, D. E.; Porter, S.; Roy, I., eds. (1996). Handbook of British Chronology (Reprinted 2003, 3rd ed.). Cambridge: Cambridge University Press. ISBN 0-521-56350-X.
