= Richard Harvey (priest) =

The Ven. Richard Charles Musgrave Harvey (8 September 1864 – 20 October 1944) was a British clergyman who served as Archdeacon of Huddersfield from 1914 to 1927 and Archdeacon of Halifax from 1927 to 1935.

He was educated Marlborough College and Keble College, Oxford. His brothers included Sir John Musgrave Harvey, who was a judge on the Supreme Court of New South Wales, and Sir Ernest Musgrave Harvey, who was Chief Cashier of the Bank of England.

Church of England titles
Preceded by William Donne	Archdeacon of Huddersfield/Halifax; 1914–1935	Succeeded by Albert Baines
