= Peter Townley =

Church of England priest

Peter Townley (born 16 November 1955) is a Church of England priest who served as Archdeacon of Pontefract, 2007–2023.

Townley was born in Blackley, Manchester and educated at Moston Brook High School, the University of Sheffield and Ridley Hall, Cambridge. He was ordained deacon in 1980, and priest in 1981. After a curacy at Christ Church, Ashton-under-Lyne he was Priest in charge of St Hugh, Oldham. He was Rector of All Saints’, Stretford from 1988 to 1996; and then Vicar of St Mary-le-Tower, Ipswich from 1996 to 2008. He was also Rural Dean of Ipswich from 2001 to 2007. In 2004, he was nominated for a bravery award after apprehending a thief, who had stolen a parishioner's handbag. In 2023, Townley returned to parish ministry, resigning his archdeaconry effective 25 September 2023.

Church of England titles
Preceded by Jonathan Greener	Archdeacon of Pontefract; 2008–2023	TBA
