= Roger Wilson (bishop) =

20th-century English bishop

Roger Plumpton Wilson KCVO (3 August 1905 – 1 March 2002) was Bishop of Wakefield, and later Chichester, in the mid 20th century.

== Biography ==
Born into an ecclesiastical family, he was educated at Winchester College and Keble College, Oxford; made deacon in Advent 1935 (22 December), by Albert David, Bishop of Liverpool, at Prescot Parish Church; and ordained priest the following Advent (20 December), by Herbert Gresford Jones, Bishop of Warrington, at Liverpool Cathedral. After curacies at St Paul's, Princes Park, Liverpool, and St John's, Smith Square, he was vicar of South Shore, Blackpool, and archdeacon of Nottingham before his appointment to the episcopate.

He was consecrated a bishop on St Mark's Day 1949 (25 April), by Cyril Garbett, Archbishop of York, at York Minster, becoming Bishop of Wakefield in succession to Henry McGowan. When George Bell retired in 1958 he was enthroned as Lord Bishop of Chichester, until his own retirement in 1974.

He taught classics at St. Andrew's College, Grahamstown, South Africa for a period. He was Clerk of the Closet from 1963 to 1975.

He was an active Freemason. He served as Grand Chaplain (the most senior clerical appointment) in the United Grand Lodge of England from 1957 to 1958.

Church of England titles
Preceded by Henry McGowan	Bishop of Wakefield; 1949 – 1958	Succeeded by John Ramsbotham
Preceded by George Bell	Bishop of Chichester; 1958 – 1974	Succeeded by Eric Kemp
