= Eric Treacy =

Anglican bishop and railway photographer (1907–1978)

The Right Reverend Eric Treacy MBE
- Bishop of Wakefield
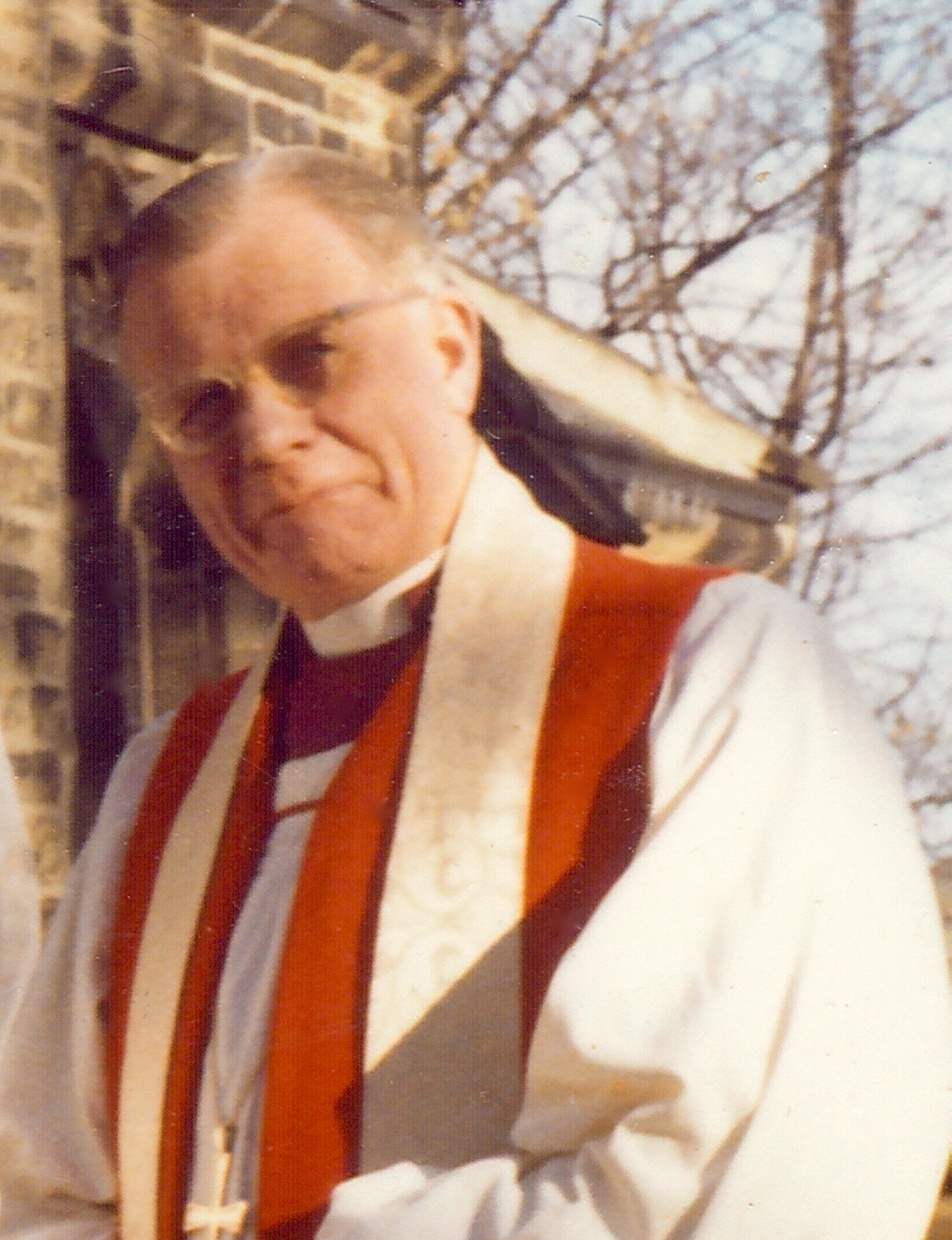
- At Christ Church Halifax in 1971, after a wedding
- Church: Church of England
- Diocese: Diocese of Wakefield
- In office: 1968 to 1976
- Predecessor: John Ramsbotham
- Successor: Colin James
- Other posts: Bishop of Pontefract (1961–1968); Archdeacon of Halifax (1949–1961)

Orders
- Ordination: 1932 (deacon) c. 1933 (priest)
- Consecration: 1961

Personal details
- Born: 2 May 1907 London, England
- Died: 13 May 1978 (aged 71) Appleby-in-Westmorland, Cumbria, England
- Denomination: Anglicanism
- Education: Haberdashers' Aske's Boys' School
- Alma mater: King's College London

Eric Treacy, MBE (2 May 1907 – 13 May 1978) was an English railway photographer and Anglican bishop.

== Early life and education ==
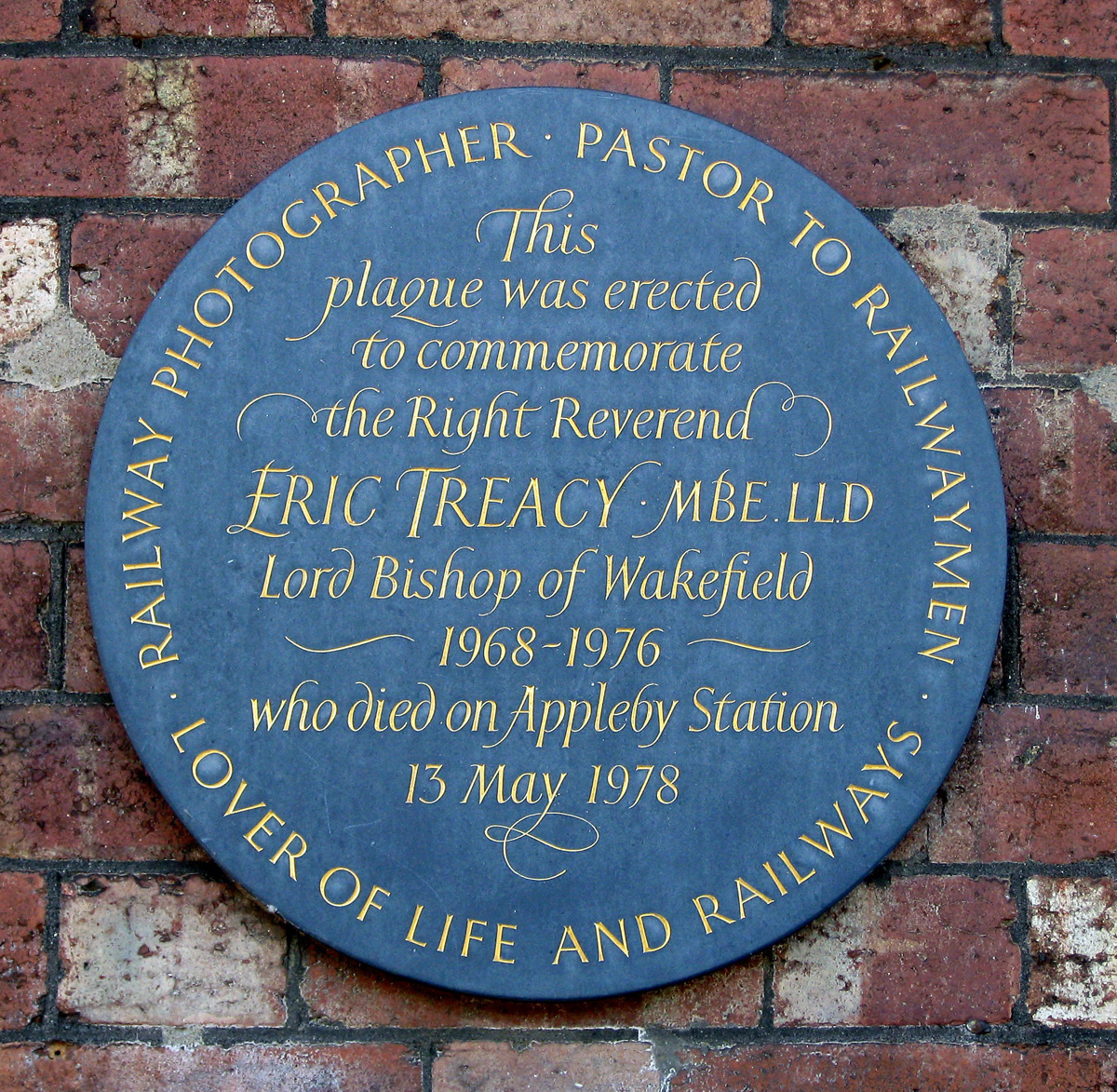
Plaque to Bishop Treacy's life and work at Appleby railway station

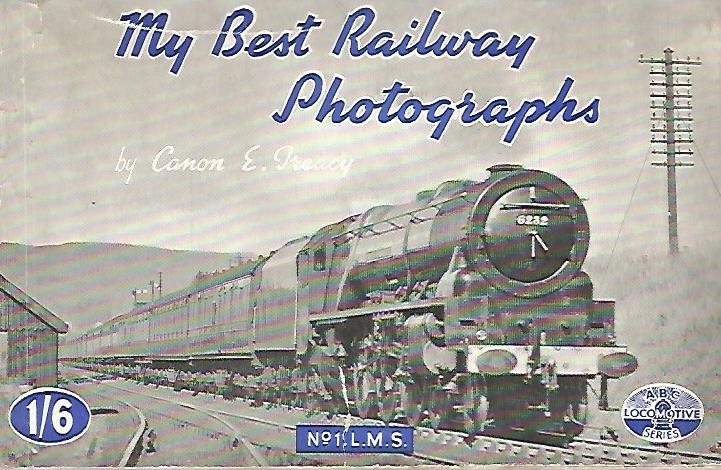
Treacy's first published railway photographs in the ABC Locomotive Series (1946)

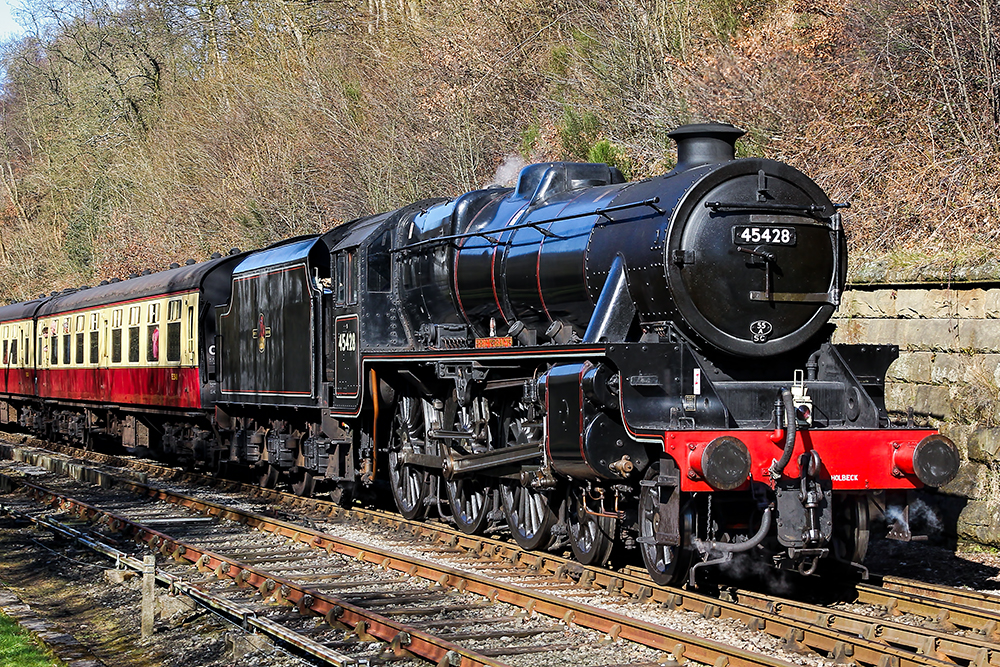
ex-LMS black five number 45428 has been named Eric Treacy in preservation

Born in London, Treacy was educated at Haberdashers' Aske's School and at King's College London, though he left without taking a degree.

== Ordained ministry ==
In 1932 he was ordained deacon in the Church of England and priest a year later, serving as curate at Liverpool parish church from 1932 to 1934. He married Mary Leyland 'May' Treacy (née Shone) (1902–1985), a voluntary social worker, in 1932. He took up railway photography, being inspired by visiting Liverpool Lime Street and getting to know his parishioners who worked on the railway. His photographic work appeared in various magazines during the 1930s.

His photography was interrupted by the Second World War when he served as Military Chaplain. On 12 March 1940, he was commissioned as Chaplain to the Forces 4th Class (equivalent to captain). On 10 May 1945, it was announced that Treacy had been Mentioned in Despatches "in recognition of gallant and distinguished services in North West Europe". He was promoted to a Chaplain to the Forces 3rd Class (equivalent to major). On 24 January 1946, he was appointed a Member of the Order of the British Empire (MBE).

In 1946 Treacy published his first book which contained images of L.M.S. locomotives. On demobilisation he became Rector of Keighley and in 1949 was appointed Archdeacon of Halifax.

=== Episcopal ministry ===
In 1961, Treacy was consecrated a bishop and appointed the Bishop of Pontefract, a suffragan bishop in the Diocese of Wakefield. In 1968, he was made Bishop of Wakefield, the diocesan bishop. He held the post until he retired from full-time ministry in 1976.

== Death and commemoration ==
On 13 May 1978, Treacy died from a heart attack on Appleby Station on the Settle-Carlisle Railway whilst waiting for a railtour hauled by BR 92220 Evening Star. A slate plaque is displayed on the main station building in his memory. He is buried at St Kentigern's Church, Crosthwaite, Keswick. In 1979 LMS Stanier Class 5 4-6-0 number 45428 was named Eric Treacy. It is now preserved on the North Yorkshire Moors Railway.

The Treacy Collection of 12,000 photographs forms part of the National Railway Museum's archive of over 1.4 million images.

== Selected works ==
The following are photograph albums of Treacy's work:

- Canon Eric Treacy (1946),My Best Railway Photographs: No.1 L.M.S., Ian Allan Ltd, London.
- Eric Treacy (1976), Roaming the Northern Rails ISBN 0-7110-0655-5
- Eric Treacy (1977), Roaming the East Coast Main Line Ian Allan. ISBN 0-7110-0812-4
- Eric Treacy (1969), Lure of Steam Ian Allan ISBN 0-7110-0098-0, 1980 reprint ISBN 0-7110-0900-7
- Eric Treacy (1981, reprint(?) Glory of Steam Ian Allan ISBN 0-7110-1171-0
- G. Freeman Allen, (1982), Great Railway Photographs by Eric Treacy Peerage Books, London
- Whitehouse, P. B.; Allen, G. Freeman (1983). Eric Treacy: Railway Photographer. David and Charles Newton Abbott UK and North Pomfret VT USA. ISBN 0-7153-8367-1.
- P. Whitehouse & J. Powell (1985), Treacy's Routes North
- P. Whitehouse & J. Powell (1990), Treacy's British Rail
- Eric Treacy (1991 reprint), Portrait of Steam ISBN 1-85648-010-0
- Eric Treacy (1994), The Best of Eric Treacy Atlantic Transport Publishers ISBN 1-85877-007-6
- David Jenkinson & Patrick Whitehouse (1988), Eric Treacy's L.M.S. Oxford Publishing Company ISBN 0-86093-381-4

Church of England titles
Preceded by George Clarkson	Bishop of Pontefract; 1961–1968	Succeeded by Gordon Fallows
Preceded by John Ramsbotham	Bishop of Wakefield; 1968–1977	Succeeded by Colin James
