= David James (bishop) =

British Anglican bishop

The Rt Revd David James PhD BA BSc
- Bishop of Bradford
- Diocese: Diocese of Bradford
- In office: 2002–2010
- Predecessor: David Smith
- Successor: Nick Baines
- Other post: Bishop of Pontefract (1998–2002)

Orders
- Ordination: 1973
- Consecration: 1998

Personal details
- Born: 6 March 1945 (age 81)
- Denomination: Anglican
- Spouse: Gillian
- Children: Four daughters: Joanna, Kate, Lucy and Rachel
- Profession: formerly a chemistry lecturer
- Education: University of Exeter

Member of the House of Lords
- Lord Spiritual
- Bishop of Bradford; 23 March 2009 – 14 July 2010

David Charles James (born 6 March 1945) is a retired Anglican bishop. He was formerly the Bishop of Bradford in the Church of England.

James was educated at Nottingham High School and the University of Exeter. After graduating with a BSc, he gained his PhD in organometallic Chemistry before lecturing in chemistry at the University of Southampton.

Following his theological studies at St John's College, Nottingham, James was ordained in 1973 and began his ordained ministry with curacies at Highfield, Southampton and Goring-by-Sea. Following this he was Anglican chaplain at the University of East Anglia and then Vicar of East Ecclesfield before returning to Highfield.

James became suffragan Bishop of Pontefract in 1998 and then became the diocesan Bishop of Bradford in 2002. He was one of the rebel bishops who signed a letter against Rowan Williams' decision not to block the appointment of Jeffrey John as Bishop of Reading in 2003. The other diocesan bishop signatories (referred to by their opponents, since there were nine, as the Nazgûl) were: Michael Scott-Joynt (Bishop of Winchester), Michael Langrish (Exeter), Michael Nazir-Ali (Rochester), Peter Forster (Chester), James Jones (Liverpool), George Cassidy (Southwell & Nottingham), Graham Dow (Carlisle) and John Hind (Chichester). James retired on 14 July 2010.

Church of England titles
Preceded by John Finney	Bishop of Pontefract; 1998–2002	Succeeded by Tony Robinson
Preceded by David Smith	Bishop of Bradford; 2002–2010	Succeeded by Nick Baines
