= Mark Hodson =

Anglican bishop

- Bishop of Hereford
- Diocese: Diocese of Hereford
- In office: 1961 – 1973 (ret.)
- Predecessor: Tom Longworth
- Successor: John Eastaugh
- Other posts: Bishop of Taunton (1956–1961); Honorary assistant bishop in London (1973–1985)

Orders
- Ordination: 1931 (deacon); 1932 (priest) by Arthur Winnington-Ingram (London)
- Consecration: 1956 by Geoffrey Fisher (Cantuar)

Personal details
- Born: 29 December 1907
- Died: 23 January 1985 (aged 77)
- Denomination: Anglican
- Education: University College London

Mark Allin Hodson (29 December 1907 – 23 January 1985) was an Anglican bishop in the latter half of the 20th century.

Educated at University College London, made deacon on Trinity Sunday (31 May) 1931 and ordained priest the following Trinity Sunday (22 May 1932) — both times by Arthur Winnington-Ingram, Bishop of London, at St Paul's Cathedral. He began his career with a curacy at St Dunstan, Stepney after which he was Missioner at St Nicholas Perivale then Rector of Poplar.

In 1955, he was appointed Bishop suffragan of Taunton and took up his see with his consecration as a bishop on 6 January 1956, by Geoffrey Fisher, Archbishop of Canterbury, at St Paul's Cathedral. In May 1956, he was appointed Rector of Dinder and a Prebendary of Wells Cathedral (remaining Bishop of Taunton). Translated to Hereford in 1961, he retired in 1973 but continued to serve the church as an honorary assistant bishop within the Diocese of London until his death on 23 January 1985, aged 77.

Church of England titles
| Preceded by Harry Thomas | Bishop of Taunton; 1955–1961 | Succeeded by Francis West |
| Preceded by Tom Longworth | Bishop of Hereford; 1961–1973 | Succeeded by John Eastaugh |
