= Ken Unwin =

Archdeacon of Pontefract (1926–2020)

The Ven. Kenneth Unwin (16 September 1926 - 27 December 2020) was Archdeacon of Pontefract from 1981 until 1992.

Unwin was born in Chesterfield and educated at Chesterfield Grammar School; St Edmund Hall, Oxford; and Ely Theological College. He was ordained deacon in 1951 and priest in 1952. After a curacy at All Saints, Leeds (1951–55), he was Priest in charge of St John's, Neville's Cross (1955–59). He was Vicar of St John the Baptist, Dodworth from 1959 to 1969; St John the Baptist, Royston from 1969 to 1973; and of St John, Wakefield from 1973 to 1982.

He was married to Beryl, and had four daughters and a son. He died in 2020, aged 94.

Church of England titles
Preceded by Edward Henderson	Archdeacon of Pontefract; 1981–1992	Succeeded by John Flack
