= William Walsh (bishop of Dover) =

British bishop

The Right Reverend William Walsh
- Bishop of Dover
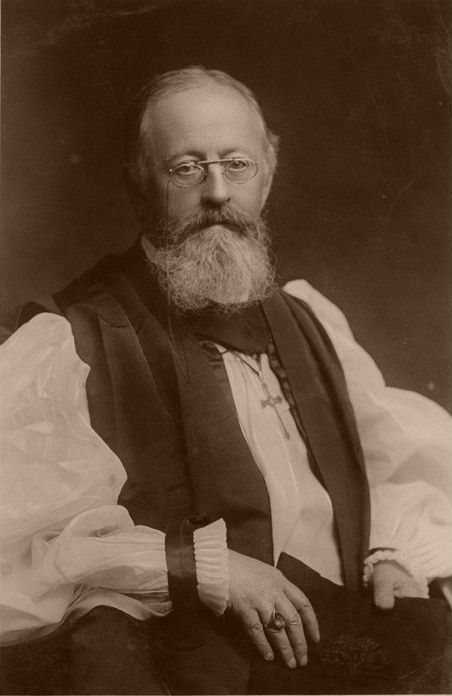
- Diocese: Canterbury
- In office: 1898–1916
- Predecessor: Rodney Eden
- Other post: Bishop of Mauritius (1891–1897)

Orders
- Ordination: Deacon 1860; Priest 1861
- Consecration: Bishop of Mauritius 1891; Bishop of Dover 1898

Personal details
- Born: 1836
- Died: 27 October 1918 (aged 81–82)
- Denomination: Anglican
- Spouse: Catherine Banchory Pickering
- Children: 2
- Education: Merton College, Oxford

William Walsh (1836 – 27 October 1918) was a Prebendary of St Paul's Cathedral, Bishop of Mauritius and Dover. At the end of his life he was Archdeacon of Canterbury. While he was Bishop of Mauritius, the island experienced one of its worst cyclones; in consequence his cathedral had to be used temporarily as a hospital.

== Background ==
Walsh's great-great-grandfather was Reverend Philip Walsh (1655–1740) who was the Prebendary of Tipperkevin, Vicar of Blessington, Rector of Ballymore Eustace, and chaplain to Primate Michael Boyle, Archbishop of Armagh.

His mother was Augusta Junietta Thwaites (1797-1873) and his father was Irish born Lieutenant William Walsh (1798-1839) of the 7th Royal Fusiliers. Walsh was born in 1836. In 1865 he married Catherine Banchory Pickering (1840-1915), daughter of Agnes Norris and General W. H. Pickering. Catherine and William Walsh had two children: William Trevor Hayne Walsh who was an educationist, and Leslie Herbert Walsh who became a surgeon.

== Career ==
He was educated at St Alban's Hall, Oxford (united with Merton College, Oxford in 1881) where he graduated B.A. in 1859 and M.A. in 1862. He was ordained deacon in 1860 and priest in 1861. In 1891 he was awarded the honorary degree of Doctor of Divinity at Oxford.

Walsh began his ecclesiastical career with a curacy at Horsell from 1860 to 1863 and was curate of Upper Chelsea from 1863 to 1865. For a period from 1865 to 1870 he was Secretary of the Church Mission Society for Kent, Surrey and Sussex. This was followed by a three-year period as Superintendent of Missionaries and Clerical Secretary of the London Diocesan Home Mission, a role that he undertook again from 1886 to 1890. He was perpetual curate of St. Andrew's Watford from 1873 until 1878 and chaplain in Rome from 1878 to 1879. Walsh became Vicar of St Matthew Newington from 1879 to 1886.

=== Mauritius ===
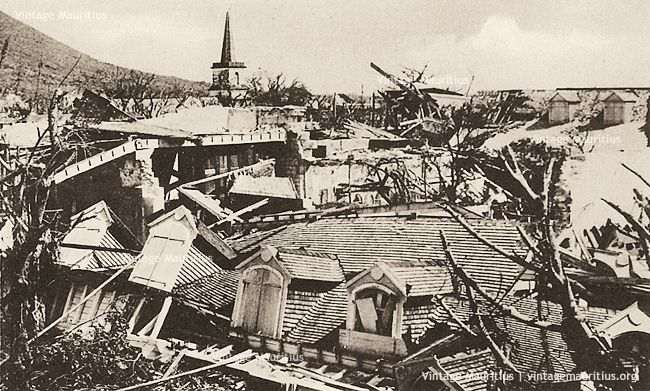
Spire of St James Cathedral visible above wreckage of 1892 cyclone

He became mission chaplain to the Bishop of London (Dr. Frederick Temple) from 1898 to 1891. Temple also made him a Prebendary of Wedland in St Paul's Cathedral from 1889 to 1891. He was consecrated Lord Bishop of Mauritius in Westminster Abbey on 2 February 1891. Just over a year later, one of the worst cyclones ever to hit Mauritius occurred on 29 April 1892 and devastated Port Louis. The Anglican Cathedral of St James was one of the few buildings that remained standing and was used as a hospital.

=== Dover ===
Walsh returned to England from Mauritius in 1897 to take up his appointment as Canon and Archdeacon of Canterbury and Assistant Bishop to Dr. Frederick Temple, who had become Archbishop of Canterbury in the previous year. In 1898 Walsh became Suffragan Bishop of Dover and in 1901 he was appointed chaplain to the Lord Warden of the Cinque Ports.

Walsh published the Progress of the Church in London During the last 50 Years (1887); this was updated in 1908 and re-titled Progress of the Church in London; from the Accession of Queen Victoria to 1908.

In 1910 his ecclesiastical jubilee was celebrated in the Library of Canterbury Cathedral where Archbishop Randall Davidson praised him for his 50 years of unremitting public work. He was presented with a triptych watercolour picture of the Cathedral by the artist, Alexander Wallace Rimington. Walsh was himself an amateur artist and Vice-President of the East Kent Art Society.

In 1913 he officiated and led prayers at the opening ceremony of The King's Hall, Herne Bay, Kent.

On 23 April 1914 he enthroned John Watts Ditchfield as Bishop of Chelmsford, amid an atmosphere of fear that militant suffragettes might burn down Chelmsford Cathedral. In the event, that did not happen.

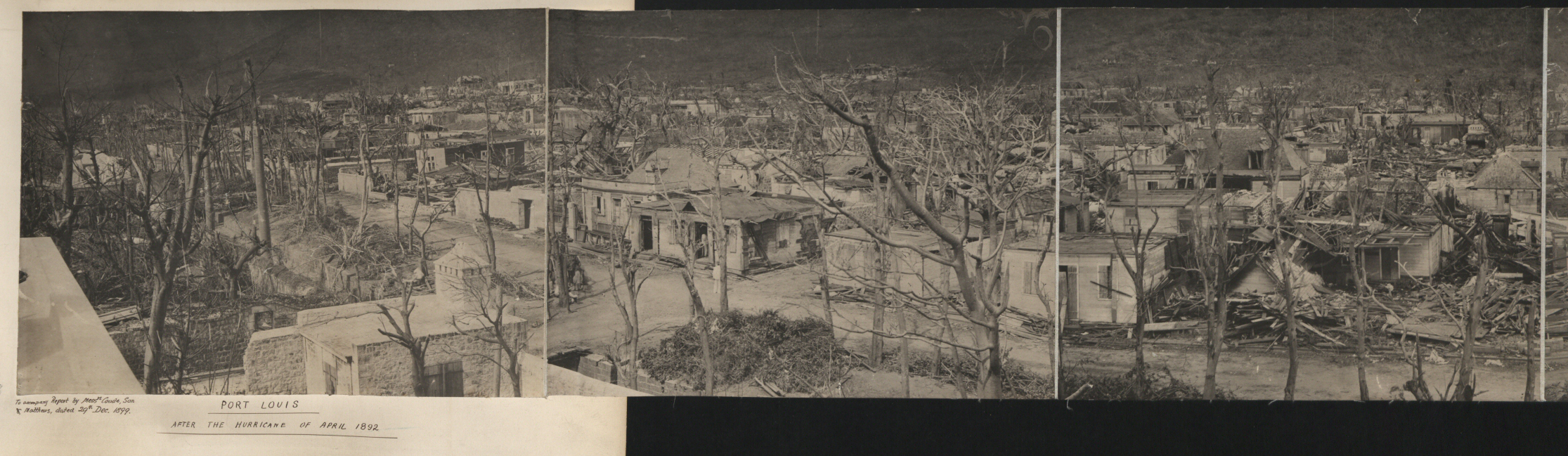
Port Louis, after the hurricane of April 1892

== Memorial ==
Walsh died on 27 October 1918 at his home in Chillenden Chambers, in the Precincts, Canterbury; the funeral was held in the Cathedral and the interment at St Martin's Church. Walsh's wife, Catherine, died in 1915. The Canterbury Cathedral Oblations Book of 1919–1926 records the unveiling, by the dean of the cathedral, of a memorial tablet dedicated to Walsh. This is in the north transept next to the tablet for Canon Danks D.D. It was unveiled on 5 May 1921 and bears the six Arms of Oxford University, of Merton College, of the See of Canterbury, of Christ Church Cathedral (Canterbury), of Mauritius and the Cinque Ports of which Canon Walsh was chaplain.

Church of England titles
Preceded by Peter Sorenson Royston	Bishop of Mauritius; 1891–1897	Succeeded by Walter Ruthven Pym
Preceded by Rodney Eden	Bishop of Dover; 1898–1916	Succeeded by Harold Ernest Bilbrough
