= Renate Zimmermann =

German organist

- Born: Renate Marx; 16 October 1936 (age 89); Berlin, Germany
- Instrument: Organist
- Spouse: Heinz Werner Zimmermann

Renate Zimmermann (born 16 October 1936 in Berlin) is a German organist.

Zimmermann (née Marx) studied organ in Heidelberg and Cologne. She received her first job as a lecturer for musical improvisation at the Spandauer Kirchenmusikschule.

In 1977 she took over a professorship for organ playing at the Frankfurt University of Music and Performing Arts. In addition, she continued to teach in Berlin-Spandau and Heidelberg and, since 1985, as a guest lecturer at the Detmold Academy of Music.

In 1988 she was awarded the first full-time professorship for organ improvisation in Germany at the Hochschule für Musik Detmold.

Since her retirement, Zimmermann has given numerous courses in Germany, England, America, Korea and China.

Zimmermann was married to the composer Heinz Werner Zimmermann (d. 2022).
