= Jürgen Henkys =

Jürgen Henkys (6 November 1929 – 22 October 2015) was a German Protestant minister and theologian.

Henkys was born in Krasnotorowka, Ostpreußen, Germany. He became a lecturer at the Sprachenkonvikt in East Berlin and the Professor for Practical Theology at the Humboldt-Universität Berlin in 1991. He is especially known for his translations of foreign-language hymns into German. Several of his hymns are contained in the current German Protestant hymnal Evangelisches Gesangbuch.

== Works ==
- Steig in das Boot. Neue niederländische Kirchenlieder. Berlin 1981, Neukirchen-Vluyn 1982
- Stimme, die Stein zerbricht. Geistliche Lieder aus benachbarten Sprachen. Strube Verlag Munich 2003) ISBN 3-89978-049-3.
- Frühlicht erzählt von Dir, in Neue geistliche Lieder aus Skandinavien, Strube Verlag 1990) ISBN 3-921946-12-3
- Preist Gott in allen Alphabeten. 15 Psalmen nach den Melodien des Genfer Psalters neu gefasst. Strube Verlag 1994
- Bibelarbeit. Der Umgang mit der Heiligen Schrift in den evangelischen Jugendverbänden nach dem Ersten Weltkrieg, Hamburg 1966
- Seelsorge und Bruderschaft, Berlin, Stuttgart 1970
- Luthers Tischreden, together with Walter Jens, ISBN 3-936618-05-4
- Das Kirchenlied in seiner Zeit. Hymnologische Beiträge, Berlin, Stuttgart 1980
- Singender und gesungener Glaube. Hymnologische Beiträge in neuer Folge, ISBN 3-525-57202-6
- Geheimnis der Freiheit. Die Gedichte Dietrich Bonhoeffers aus der Haft. Biographie Poesie Theologie. Gütersloh 2005 ISBN 3-579-01891-4

=== Translations ===
The Evangelische Gesangbuch includes many hymnal translations from several languages:

==== From the Dutch ====
- "Het volk dat wandelt in het duister". Text by Jan Willem Schulte Nordholt (1959), Music by Frits Mehrtens (1959). Found in the Dutch hymnal Liedboek voor de Kerken 1973 (LvK) Nr. 25. German: "Das Volk, das noch im Finstern wandelt" (1981).
- "Met de boom des levens". Text by Willem Barnard (1963), Music by Ignace de Sutter (1964). LvK Nr. 184. German: "Holz auf Jesu Schulter" (1975).
- "Hoe groot de vrugten zijn" Text by Joachim Frants Oudaen, 1685. English translation: "This joyful Eastertide" by George Ratcliffe Woodward, 1902. Music by Dirk Raphaelszoon Camphuysen, 1924. German: "Der schöne Ostertag" (1983).
- "Kwam van Godswege". Text by Huub Oosterhuis (1962/1973), Music by Jaap Geraedts (1965). German: "Kam einst zum Ufer", (1975).
- "Jezus die langs het water liep". Text by Ad den Besten, (1961), Music by Frits Mehrtens (1961). LvK Nr. 47. German: "Jesus, der zu den Fischern lief" (1975).
- "Geef vrede, Heer, geef vrede". Text by Jan Nooter (1963), Music: "Ik wil mij gaan vertroosten", LvK Nr. 285. German: "Gib Frieden, Herr, gib Frieden" (1980), EG 430.

==== From the English ====
- "Now the green blade rises". Text by John Macleod Campbell Crum (1928), Music: Noel nouvelet France, Provence 15th century. German: "Korn, das in die Erde" (1976). EG 98.
- "Morning Has Broken". Text by Eleanor Farjeon (1931), Music: gälisches Volkslied, 19th Century. German: "Morgenlicht leuchtet" (1987) EG 455.
- A stanza from "For All the Saints" as the sixths stanza of Herr, mach uns stark (1988), EG 154, GL 552.

==== From the Norwegian ====
- "Fylt av glede over livets under" Text by Svein Ellingsen (1971) Music by Egil Hovland (1977). German: "Voller Freude über dieses Wunder" (1982).
- "Herre, du har reist meg opp". Text by Sven Ellingsen (1955), Music by Trond Kverno (1968). German: "Herr, du hast mich angerührt"(1982). EG 383.
