= Gavin Reid =

English Anglican clergyman (born 1934)

The Rt Revd Gavin Reid OBE
- Bishop of Maidstone
- Diocese: Diocese of Canterbury
- In office: 1992–2001
- Predecessor: David Smith
- Successor: Graham Cray
- Other posts: Honorary assistant bishop in St Edmundsbury & Ipswich (2008–present); Consultant Missioner, CPAS (1990–1992)

Orders
- Ordination: 1960 (deacon); 1961 (priest)
- Consecration: 1992

Personal details
- Born: 24 May 1934 (age 92)
- Denomination: Anglican
- Parents: Arthur and Jean Guthrie
- Spouse: Mary Smith (m. 1959)
- Children: Two sons, one daughter
- Profession: Author
- Education: London (Queen Mary and King's)

Gavin Hunter Reid OBE (born 24 May 1934) was the Bishop of Maidstone from 1992 until 2001. Reid's post was in effect the suffragan bishop of the Diocese of Canterbury, since the Bishop of Dover is the de facto diocesan due to the Archbishop of Canterbury's other duties.

Reid was educated at The John Roan School in Greenwich and King's College London. Ordained deacon in 1960 and priest in 1961, after a curacy at St Paul's Church, East Ham he served in a succession of administrative posts for the Church Pastoral Aid Society before his ordination to the episcopate. He is a prolific author and his works include The Gagging of God (1969), A New Happiness (1974), To Reach a Nation (1987), Our Place in his Story (1994) and To Canterbury with Love. He was awarded the OBE in 1999 for his contribution to the Millennium celebrations. He retired to Beccles in 2001 and is an assistant bishop in the Diocese of St Edmundsbury and Ipswich.

Church of England titles
Preceded by David Smith	Bishop of Maidstone; 1992–2001	Succeeded by Graham Cray
