= Henry McGowan =

Anglican bishop (1891–1948)

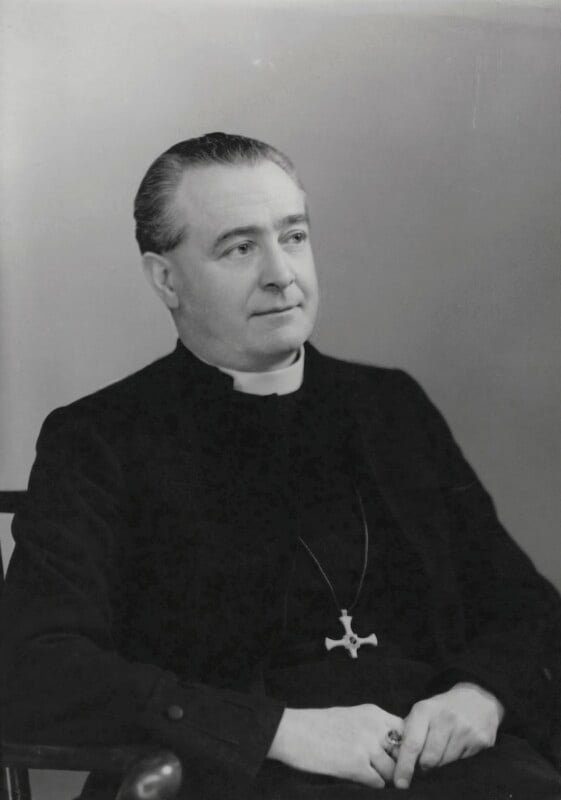
McGowan in 1946

Henry McGowan (1891 – 8 September 1948) was an Anglican bishop in the first half of the 20th century.

He was born in 1891, educated at Bristol Grammar School and St Catharine's College, Cambridge and ordained in 1914.

After a period as a curate in Cheltenham he was a chaplain to the British Armed Forces during World War I. He was appointed in July 1918 when he was only 27 and a bachelor. He could ride, speak French and preach extempore. He was sent to France in July 1918, as a chaplain to the 4th Division and to Italy 2 months later, and a report dated 5 February 1919 described him as 'satisfactory'. He then served another curacy at St Michael's, Bournemouth. He was then vicar at St Mark, Birmingham and Emmanuel, Southport before becoming rural dean and then, in 1938, Archdeacon of Aston. In November 1945 he was appointed Bishop of Wakefield and consecrated in February 1946. The file on his appointment to Wakefield describes McGowan as 'a thoroughly sound, sensible, practical, straightforward man' who 'really runs Birmingham'. Alan Webster, a future Dean of St Paul's, remembered McGowan as 'an over-energetic parish priest... He was known for his industry; a deep strain of nervousness was leavened by a developed sense of humour and the gifts of a raconteur. Integrity, absence of malice and an integrated 'all of a piece' personality which were hallmarks of his ministry... Somehow... he whirlwinded his way from one idea to another making a strain on his heart'.

He died in office on 8 September 1948.

Church of England titles
Preceded by Campbell Hone	Bishop of Wakefield; 1946–1948	Succeeded by Roger Wilson
