= John Eastaugh =

British bishop

John Richard Gordon Eastaugh (11 March 1920 – 16 February 1990) was an Anglican bishop in the last third of the 20th century .

He was born on 11 March 1920 and educated at the University of Leeds and ordained in 1944. He was made a deacon on Trinity Sunday 1944 (4 June) by Geoffrey Fisher, Bishop of London, and ordained a priest the next Michaelmas (23 September 1945) by Robert Moberly, Bishop of Stepney — both times at St Paul's Cathedral. He began his career with a curacy at All Saints' Poplar and then held incumbencies at Hackney and Heston before being collated Archdeacon of Middlesex in 1966. Having been elected and confirmed Bishop of Hereford during December 1973/January 1974, he was ordained to the episcopate by Michael Ramsey, Archbishop of Canterbury, at Westminster Abbey on 24 January 1974, serving until he died in post 16 years later on 16 February 1990, aged 69.

Church of England titles
Preceded by Mark Hodson	Bishop of Hereford; 1973 – 1990	Succeeded by John Oliver
