= John Finney =

Anglican Bishop of Pontefract 1993-1998

The Rt Revd John Finney BA(Oxon) DipTh
- Bishop of Pontefract
- Diocese: Diocese of Wakefield
- In office: 1993–1998
- Predecessor: Richard Hare
- Successor: David James
- Other post: Honorary assistant bishop in Southwell (1998–present)

Orders
- Ordination: 1958 (deacon); c. 1959 (priest)
- Consecration: 1993

Personal details
- Born: 1 May 1932 (age 94)
- Denomination: Anglican
- Parents: Arthur & Elaine
- Spouse: Sheila Russell (m. 1959)
- Children: 3 daughters
- Profession: Author (evangelism)
- Education: Hertford College, Oxford

John Thornley Finney (born 1 May 1932) was the eighth Suffragan Bishop of Pontefract.

He was educated at Charterhouse and Hertford College, Oxford. Ordained in 1958, he began his career with curacies in Headington and Aylesbury and was then successively Rector of Tollerton, Vicar of St Margarets Aspley Adviser in Evangelism to the Bishop of Southwell and Nottingham and then Officer for the Decade of Evangelism before ascending to the Episcopate – a post he held from 1993 until 1998. An eminent author, in retirement he continues to minister, as an honorary assistant bishop within the Diocese of Southwell and Nottingham.

Church of England titles
Preceded by Richard Hare	Bishop of Pontefract; 1993–1998	Succeeded by David James
