= Rodney Eden =

English Anglican suffragan bishop (1853–1940)

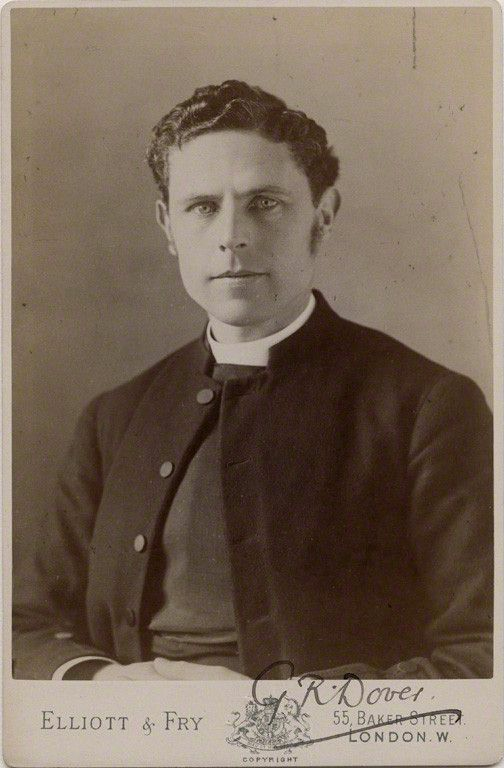
Rodney Eden as Bishop of Dover in 1895

George Rodney Eden (called Rodney; 9 September 1853 – 7 January 1940) was an Anglican bishop, Bishop of Dover (a suffragan bishop in the Diocese of Canterbury) and then Bishop of Wakefield (diocesan bishop of the Diocese of Wakefield).

== Background ==
He was born in Sunderland, the son of John Patrick Eden, Rector of Sedgefield and an honorary canon of Durham Cathedral; and was a descendant of Robert Eden, 3rd Baronet (of West Auckland) and of the eighteenth century naval hero, Admiral Rodney, after whom he was named. He was educated at Reading School and Pembroke College, Cambridge. His daughter, Dorothy, was the first woman in the First World War to be Mentioned in Despatches for ‘bravery while nursing’ in January, 1917. She later married Clement Ricketts who became Bishop of Dunwich (1945–55).

Eden died at Harpenden, Hertfordshire, and was buried at Great Haseley, Oxfordshire.

His reputation was that of a dedicated and busy ecclesiastical leader attached to his Wakefield diocese who refused translation to a more prestigious see. He was one of the most photogenic of bishops, ‘With his wavy, silver hair, his clear-cut ivory-coloured face, his candid blue eyes, his musical voice, and his eighteenth-century air of courtesy and welcome, in appearance he was the embodiment of what a bishop should be’.

== Career ==
He began his ecclesiastical career as Chaplain to Joseph Lightfoot, Bishop of Durham. After being Vicar at Bishop Auckland (where the Bishop of Durham lives) — in latter years he was also Rural Dean — he began what his Times obituary described as "nearly forty years of quiet but efficient service to the episcopate".

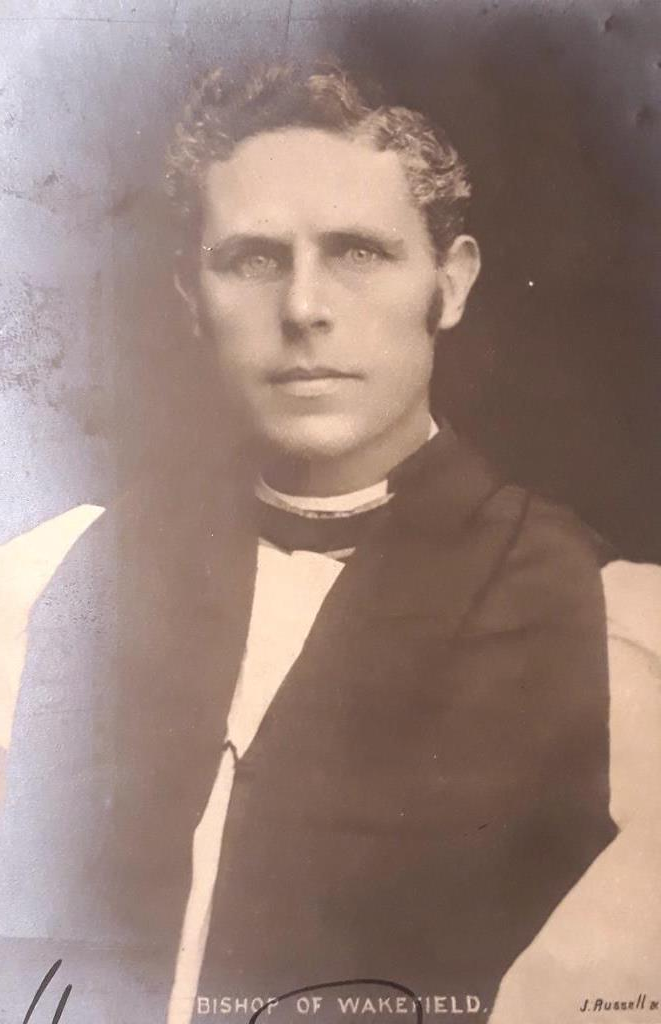
Rt Rev Rodney Eden, Lord Bishop of Wakefield

While serving as Bishop suffragan of Dover in the Diocese of Canterbury, he was also Archdeacon of Canterbury and (therefore) a canon residentiary of Canterbury Cathedral; he was translated to Wakefield in 1897, where he was the diocesan bishop until his retirement in 1928. He served as Chair of the Education Committee of the Church of England National Assembly.

In August, 1914, on the declaration of war against Germany and her allies, Eden forewarned of the tragedies that the war would bring. ‘One thing is certain. Suspense, suffering, anguish await us all ... In War human nature sinks to its worst and rises to its best. We shall emerge a different people. Tried by fire let us pray that we may come forth like gold.’ Eden also noted that Britain’s political leaders had not wanted war but felt that national honour was at stake, and observed that it was scandalous that Christian nations should be ‘at each other’s throats’. For the remainder of the War, Eden encouraged recruitment of clergy to the chaplaincies, support for new and expanded army camps and the regular compilation of lists of clergy families serving in the Forces.

== Sources ==
- Taylor, Kate. Wakefield Diocese (2012)

Church of England titles
Preceded by Edward Parry	Bishop of Dover; 1890–1897	Succeeded by William Walsh
Preceded by Walsham How	Bishop of Wakefield; 1897–1928	Succeeded by James Seaton
