= Richard Brook (bishop) =

English scholar, bishop and school master (1880-1969)

- Bishop of St Edmundsbury and Ipswich
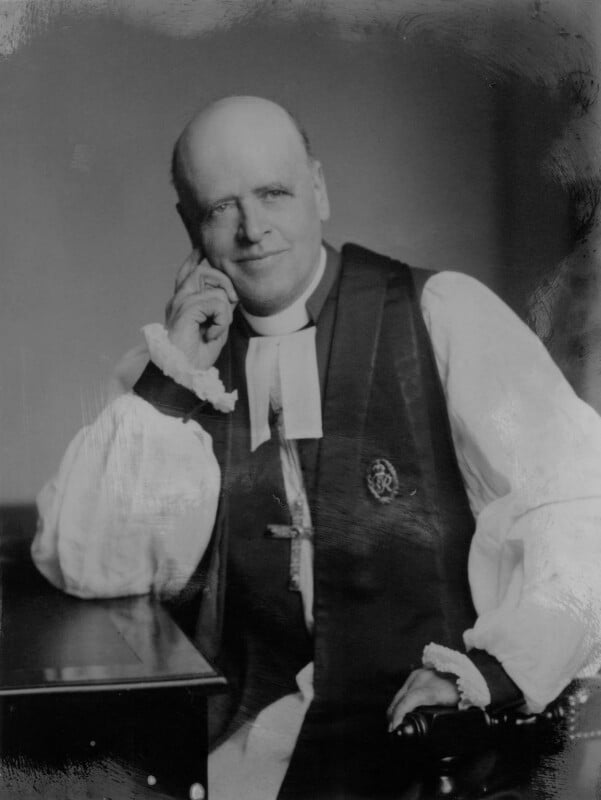
- Brook in the 1940s
- Church: Church of England
- Diocese: Diocese of St Edmundsbury and Ipswich
- In office: 1940-1953
- Predecessor: Walter Godfrey Whittingham
- Successor: Arthur Harold Morris
- Previous posts: Vicar of Doncaster (1928-c. 1935); Canon of Sheffield Cathedral (1928-c. 1935); Archdeacon of Coventry (1935-1940)

Personal details
- Born: 1880 Bradford, West Yorkshire, England
- Died: 1969 (aged 88–89)
- Education: Lincoln College, Oxford; Merton College, Oxford

Richard Brook (1880-1969) was an English scholar, academic and school master who was Bishop of St Edmundsbury and Ipswich from 1940 to 1953, having previously been in academia as Principal of Liverpool College.

== Biography ==
Brook was born in Bradford, West Yorkshire, in 1880 and was educated at Bradford Grammar School and Lincoln College, Oxford, where he was awarded 1st Class Honours in Modern History and Theology. He was a Fellow of Merton College, Oxford, 1907–19, and he contributed an essay in Foundations in 1912, an influential publication expressing "Christian belief in terms of modern thought".

When the First World War broke out, Brook joined the YMCA, serving in France, writing to diocesan bishops in 1915 seeking volunteers from the clergy to staff ‘huts’ for soldiers in need of recreation and refreshments. His letter is referred to in many monthly diocesan gazettes, including the Chester Diocesan Gazette. In 1916, Brook applied for a commission as a Temporary Chaplain to the Forces (TCF). His interview card described him as "Tall. Suitable" and noted the names of his influential referees including the Archbishop of Canterbury and the Vice-Chancellor of Oxford University. Brook was appointed and seems to have spent the bulk of his time at the Officers School at Brocton in Staffordshire. He was twice Mentioned in Despatches.

The War led to a career change. In 1919, he was appointed Headmaster of Liverpool College where he remained for nine years. He then moved to parochial work as Vicar of Doncaster and Canon of Sheffield Cathedral and, in 1935, was appointed Archdeacon of Coventry.

By 1940, although 60, Brook began to be seriously considered for a diocesan bishopric in England. The key figure in the appointment of bishops was the Prime Minister whose ‘patronage secretary’ compiled evidence from many quarters particularly from the Archbishops of Canterbury and York. In 1940, the choice for the vacancy at Leicester rested between Brook and Vernon Smith, Bishop of Woolwich and, on Archbishop Lang's recommendation, Prime Minister Neville Chamberlain nominated Smith who was appointed. Lang had described Brook as a scholar with parochial experience and had noted ‘Mrs Brook I am told is quite admirable’. Smith was a bachelor but was already a Suffragan Bishop and this seemed to be his final opportunity for preferment. Brook was more successful for St Edmundsbury in the summer of 1940. By then there was a new Prime Minister, Winston Churchill, who preferred ‘warriors’ to ‘gownsmen’. Unsurprisingly, the choice rested between two First World War TCFs, Richard Brook and Russell Barry DSO. Lang preferred Brook since Barry had no rural experience and was ‘deaf’. Brook was appointed.

Brook's early years in the diocese were hampered by wartime petrol rationing and the influx of temporary wartime personnel linked to the RAF and army bases but Brook's style brought criticism. He was regarded as an astute financier and administrator who ‘would have made a most successful captain of industry’. He was not the most approachable of bishops, allegedly having a notice in his study to the effect that if his callers did not waste his time, he would not waste theirs. He must have realised this deficiency because years after his retirement he would credit his secretary for easing the path to his study for nervous visitors conscious of his off-putting poster. He did have one considerable success with his post-War One Million Shilling Fund which raised over £60,000 for the diocese to be spent on buildings, clergy stipends etc. However, it was Brook's unpopular style which was evident in the note prepared by the Prime Minister's 'patronage secretary’ as the contextual background for the appointment of Brook's successor in 1953: " ... during the last 13 years Suffolk has had a Bishop who was largely academic and, without meaning to, failed to understand his people. There have been widespread requests from the diocese for a purely pastoral bishop, and indeed neighbouring bishops have gone out of their way to make the same point."

Brook's successor, Arthur Morris, was among the most popular and pastoral of bishops.

Brook was in his 90th year when he died in 1969. He was survived by his wife.

== Notes ==
Church of England titles
Preceded by Walter Godfrey Whittingham	Bishop of St Edmundsbury and Ipswich; 1940 – 1953	Succeeded by Arthur Harold Morris
