= William Donne (priest) =

William Donne (29 October 1845 – 5 March 1914) was Archdeacon of Huddersfield from 1892 to 1913.

Baines was born into an ecclesiastical family in Oswestry; educated at Wellington College and Brasenose College, Oxford; and ordained in 1876.

He was the Curate in charge of the Winchester College Mission from 1876 to 1881; and then held incumbencies at Limehouse, Great Yarmouth and Wakefield. He was an Honorary Chaplain to Queen Victoria and then King Edward VII.

Church of England titles
Preceded by Richard Charles Musgrave Harvey	Archdeacon of Halifax; 1946–1951	Succeeded by Albert Baines
