= Walter Whittingham =

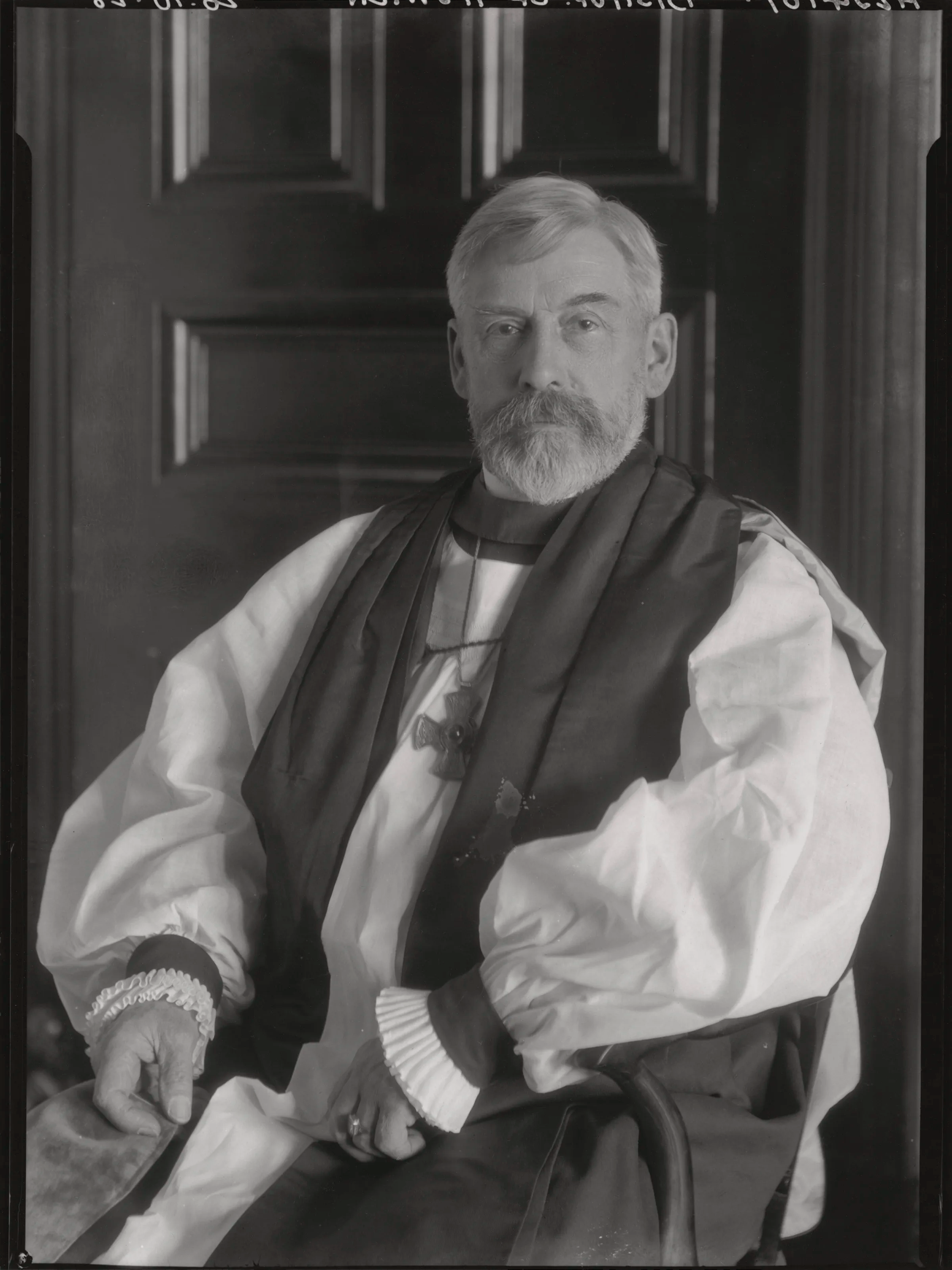
Whittingham in 1928

Walter Godfrey Whittingham (5 October 1861 – 17 June 1941) was a Church of England bishop.

== Education ==
Whittingham was educated at the City of London School and Peterhouse, Cambridge.

== Career ==
Ordained in 1886, Whittingham began his career with curacies at St Margaret's Church, Leicester and St Thomas the Apostle's, South Wigston. He subsequently held incumbencies at Weedon, Buckinghamshire, Knighton, Leicestershire and Glaston, Rutland. He was Archdeacon of Oakham from 1918 to 1923 when he was ordained to the episcopate as the third Bishop of St Edmundsbury and Ipswich, a post he held for 17 years. He was consecrated bishop at Westminster Abbey on 1 November 1923, by Randall Davidson, Archbishop of Canterbury;

== Death ==
Whittingham died on 17 June 1941.

== Notes ==
Church of England titles
Preceded by Edward Moore	Archdeacon of Oakham; 1918–1923	Succeeded by Arthur Greaves
Preceded by Albert Augustus David	Bishop of Saint Edmundsbury and Ipswich; 1923 – 1940	Succeeded by Richard Brook
