= James Seaton (bishop) =

British Anglican bishop (1868–1938)

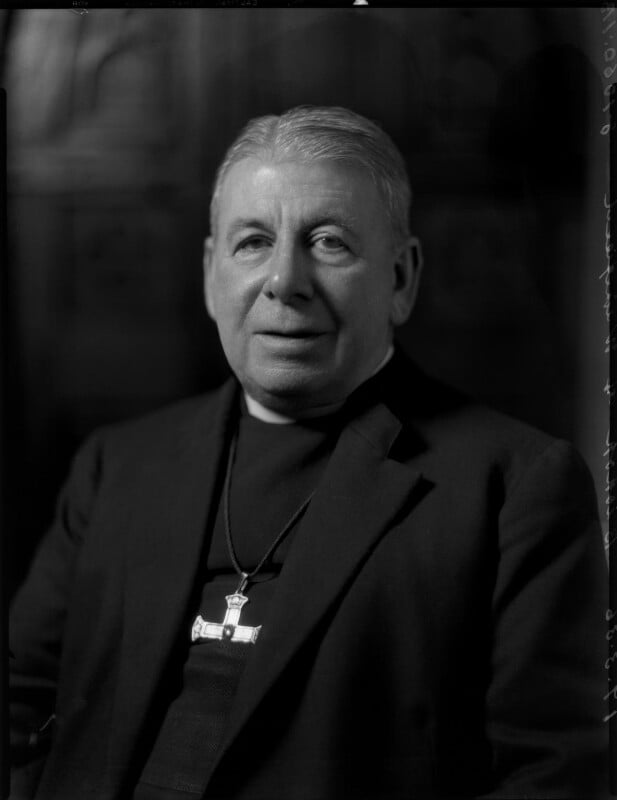
Seaton in 1936

James Buchanan Seaton (19 March 1868 – 25 May 1938) was a British Anglican Bishop in the first half of the 20th century.

== Early life and career ==
Seaton was born on 19 March 1868, educated at Leeds Grammar School and matriculated at Christ Church, Oxford in 1886 where his mentor – Samuel Rolles Driver – had been canon since 1883. Seaton was ordained in 1894. After a period as a Curate in Oswestry he was Vice-Principal of Leeds Clergy School, then Vicar of St. Bartholomew's Church, Armley. From 1909 until 1914 he was Archdeacon of Johannesburg when he became Principal of Cuddesdon Theological College which adhered to high church practices. Seaton held this position until his appointment to the episcopate as Bishop of Wakefield in 1928. An eminent author, he died in post on 25 May 1938 aged 70. He had become a Doctor of Divinity (DD).

=== Middleton family connection ===
When principal of Cuddesdon (1914 to 1928), Seaton reportedly officiated at the 1921 funeral of solicitor Gilbert Middleton at St Chad's Church, Far Headingley. Seaton had known Middleton as fellow students at Leeds Grammar School. Seaton also officiated at the Leeds wedding of Gilbert Middleton's daughter, Margaret Middleton, in January 1925 and her brother, solicitor Alan Lomas Middleton, the following year at which their uncle, solicitor R. Noel Middleton – great-grandfather of Catherine, Princess of Wales – was a groomsman.

== Sources ==
- Chisholm, Hugh, ed. (1911). "King, Edward" . Encyclopædia Britannica. Vol. 15 (11th ed.). Cambridge University Press. p. 803.
- Russell, George William Erskine (1912). Edward King, Sixtieth Bishop of Lincoln: A Memoir. London: Longman-Green.

Church of England titles
Preceded by Rodney Eden	Bishop of Wakefield; 1928–1938	Succeeded by Campbell Hone
