= Albert Baines =

Albert Baines was Archdeacon of Halifax from 1935 to 1946.

Baines was educated at St John's College, Cambridge. He was Curate of All Saints', Sheffield; and then held incumbencies in Newcastle-under-Lyme, St Helens, and Huddersfield before his appointment as Archdeacon. He died on 14 January 1951.

Church of England titles
Preceded by Richard Charles Musgrave Harvey	Archdeacon of Halifax; 1935–1946	Succeeded by Arthur Morris
