= Daughtry =

Daughtry may refer to:

- Daughtry (band), a rock band fronted by Chris Daughtry
  - Daughtry (album), debut music album from Daughtry
  - Chris Daughtry (born 1979), American Idol finalist in 2006 and lead vocalist for Daughtry
- Mattie Daughtry, American politician
- N. Leo Daughtry (born 1940), American state senator from North Carolina (Republican)
- Dean Daughtry (1946–2023), American keyboardist with the Atlanta Rhythm Section
