= Bishop of Wakefield =

Episcopal title

The Bishop of Wakefield is an episcopal title which takes its name after the city of Wakefield in West Yorkshire, England. The title was first created for a diocesan bishop in 1888, but it was dissolved in 2014. The Bishop of Wakefield is now an area bishop who has oversight of an episcopal area in the Diocese of Leeds.

The area Bishop of Wakefield is one of the area bishops of the Diocese of Leeds in the Province of York. The Bishop of Wakefield has oversight of the archdeaconry of Pontefract, which consists of the deaneries of Barnsley, Pontefract, and Wakefield. As well as being the area bishop for the Wakefield Episcopal Area, Robinson also provides alternative episcopal oversight for the Diocese of Leeds as a whole, administering to those parishes in the diocese which reject the ministry of priests who are women.

The area bishop's residence is Pontefract House, Wakefield. The current area Bishop of Wakefield is Tony Robinson, who has previously been the suffragan Bishop of Pontefract until that see was translated (renamed) to Wakefield in 2015.

The Bishop of Pontefract was an episcopal title used by a suffragan bishop of the Church of England Dioceses of Wakefield and then of Leeds, in the Province of York, England. The title took its name after the town of Pontefract in West Yorkshire; the See was erected under the Suffragans Nomination Act 1888 by Order in Council dated 27 October 1930. In the Wakefield diocese, the Bishop of Pontefract was the suffragan bishop for the diocese as a whole but primarily had extended episcopal oversight for those parishes which rejected the ministry of priests who were women; Robinson then fulfilled that role for the new diocese.

Following the creation of the Diocese of Leeds on 20 April 2014, the see was eventually renamed to become the suffragan see for the area Bishop of Wakefield. To that end the General Synod approved a petition from the Bishop of Leeds in February 2015; that petition was approved by the Queen-in-Council on 19 March 2015 and so the see was translated to Wakefield.

== List of bishops ==
Bishops of Pontefract
From	Until	Incumbent	Notes
1931	1938	Campbell Hone	Domestic Chaplain to Bishop Eden, Wakefield, 1902-5. Vice Principal of Leeds Clergy School, 1905-9. Vicar of Mount Pellon, Halifax, 1909-16. Vicar of Brighouse, 1916-20. Rector and Rural Dean of Whitby, 1920-7. Canon and Prebendary Wistow in York Minster,1927-31.Archdeacon 1931-38, Subsequently to Bishop of Wakefield 1938-46.
1939	1949	Tom Longworth	Canon and Archdeacon, 1938. Subsequently Bishop of Hereford, 1949-61.
1949	1954	Arthur Morris	Canon and Archdeacon, 1946. Subsequently Bishop of St Edmundsbury and Ipswich, 1954–65.
1954	1961	George Clarkson	Canon, 1936. Vicar of Church of St. Mary Magdalene, Newark-on-Trent 1948. Archdeacon, 1954. Subsequently Dean of Guildford, 1961–68, Assistant Bishop of Lincoln, 1968-77.
1961	1968	Eric Treacy	Vicar St Mary's Edge Hill, 1936-41. Chaplain to the Forces, 1940-5. Rector of Keighley, 1945-9. Rural Dean of South Craven, 1947-9. Rural Dean and Vicar of Halifax, 1950-61. Archdeacon of Halifax, 1949-61. Archdeacon 1961-8. Subsequently Bishop of Wakefield, 1968-77.
1968	1971	Gordon Fallows	Canon 1952. Archdeacon of Lancaster, 1955. Subsequently Bishop of Sheffield, 1971-79.
1971	1992	Richard Hare	Canon 1959-65. Archdeacon of Westmorland and Furness, 1965–71.
1993	1998	John Finney	Canon 1984-9. Officer for Decade of Evangelism.
1998	2002	David James	Subsequently Bishop of Bradford, 2002-2010.
2002	2015	Tony Robinson	Area bishop for Wakefield and interim area bishop for Huddersfield since 20 April 2014; See translated to Wakefield, 19 March 2015; retirement scheduled for 31 August 2024.
Bishops of Wakefield
From	Until	Incumbent	Notes
2015	2024	Tony Robinson	Previously Bishop of Pontefract. That see was translated (renamed) to Wakefield on 19 March 2015; retired 31 August 2024.
2025	present	Malcolm Chamberlain	Consecrated 11 June 2025.
