= Anne Dawtry =

Anglican Archdeacon

Anne Frances Dawtry (born 25 October 1957) is a retired priest who served as Archdeacon of Halifax.

Dawtry was educated at Westfield College, London and Ripon College Cuddesdon; and was a lecturer at the University of Chester before being ordained in 1994. After curacies in Corfe Mullen and Parkstone she became Chaplain of Bournemouth University. She was with the Ordained Local Ministry Scheme until 2006 when she returned to parish work at Chorlton-cum-Hardy, a post she held until 2011. A keen gardener and photographer, she was officially welcomed at a service on Sunday 22 January 2012 at Huddersfield Parish Church. Dawtry has retired effective 31 October 2021.

Church of England titles
| Preceded by Robert Freeman | Archdeacon of Halifax; 2012–2021 | TBA |
