= Walsham How =

English Anglican bishop (1823–1897)

- Bishop of Wakefield
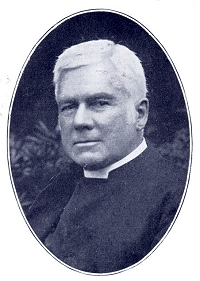
- Photograph of How.
- Diocese: Diocese of Wakefield
- In office: 1889 – 1897 (d.)
- Successor: Rodney Eden
- Other post: Bishop of Bedford (1879–1888)

Orders
- Ordination: 1846
- Consecration: 1879 by Archibald Campbell Tait (Canterbury)

Personal details
- Born: 13 December 1823 Shrewsbury, Shropshire, England
- Died: 1 August 1897 (aged 73) Leenane, County Mayo, Ireland
- Buried: Whittington, Shropshire, England
- Denomination: Anglican
- Education: Wadham College, Oxford

William Walsham How, known as Walsham How (13 December 1823 – 10 August 1897) was an English Anglican bishop.

== Early life ==
How was the son of a Shrewsbury solicitor; How was educated at Shrewsbury School, Wadham College, Oxford and University College, Durham. He was ordained in 1846, and after a curacy at Kidderminster, began more than thirty years actively engaged in parish work in Shropshire, as curate at the Abbey Church in Shrewsbury in 1848. In 1851 he became Rector of Whittington and was at one point Rural Dean of Oswestry in 1860, then Suffragan Bishop of Bedford (for East London) and in turn Bishop of Wakefield.

== Writings ==
It was during his period at Whittington he wrote the bulk of his published works and founded the first public library in Oswestry. In 1863–1868 he brought out a Commentary on the Four Gospels and he also wrote a manual for the Holy Communion. Published by the Society for Promoting Christian Knowledge during the 1890s under the title "Holy Communion, Preparation and Companion...together with the Collects, Epistles and Gospels" this book was widely distributed and many copies still survive today. In the movement for infusing new spiritual life into the church services, especially among the poor, How was a great force. He took a stand against what he regarded as immoral literature and Thomas Hardy claimed that he had burned a copy of his novel Jude the Obscure. How was much helped in his earlier work by his wife, Frances A. Douglas (died 1887).

=== Contributions to botany ===
Walsham How "had an excellent knowledge of the British flora." In 1857 he was one of the founders of the Oswestry and Welshpool Naturalists' Field Club and Archaeological Society. He was at one time its president, and he contributed a paper on "The Botany of Great Orme's Head" (1865). He was also the botanical contributor to The Gossiping Guide for Wales. In 1890 he was president of the Yorkshire Naturalists' Union. His obituary in respect of his contribution to botany was published in the October 1897 issue of The Naturalist.

== Church work ==
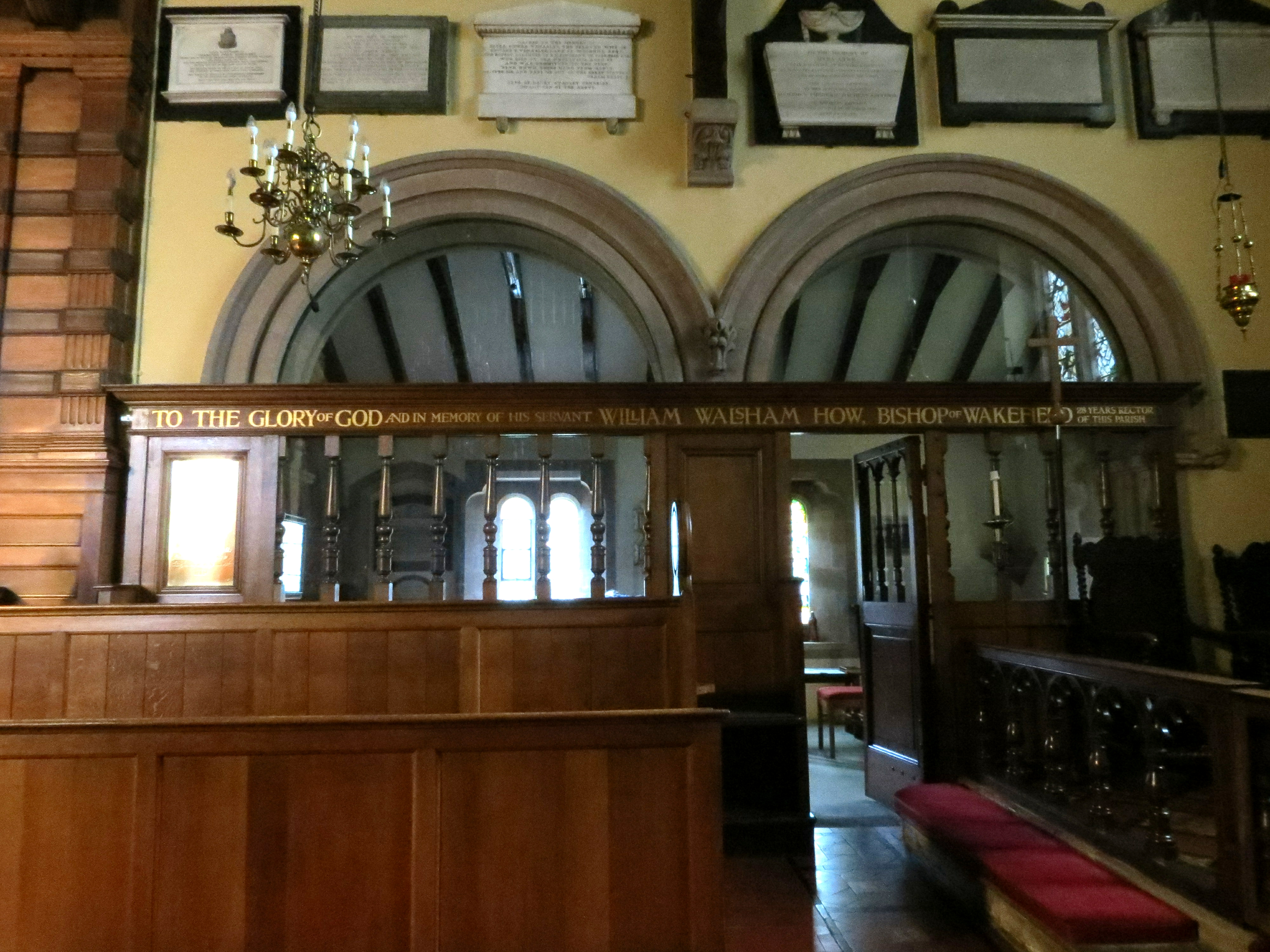
Memorial screen to William Walsham How in Whittington Church

He refused preferment on several occasions, but his energy and success made him well known, and in 1879 he was consecrated a bishop, by Archibald Campbell Tait, Archbishop of Canterbury, on 25 July at St Paul's Cathedral; he became the first modern suffragan bishop in London, under the title of Bishop of Bedford, his province being the East End. There he became the inspiring influence of a revival of church work. He founded the East London Church Fund, and enlisted a large band of enthusiastic helpers, his popularity among all classes being immense. He was particularly fond of children, and was commonly called "the children's bishop".

When he came to East London in 1879 "he found great need of women's help for the poor in the huge parishes of his diocese". He then planned to establish a Deaconess Community and applied to the (West) London Diocesan Deaconess Institution (LDDI). The LDDI sent its Sister Louisa in autumn 1880 and the East London Diocesan Deaconess Institution was founded at Sutton Place, Hackney. Deaconess Sisters worked in various East London parishes and eventually the Institution became the All Saints Deaconess Home at Meynell Crescent (1894/5-1924). A few of the remaining Sisters joined the LDDI which continued work in the East End for a few years.

== Bishopric ==
After being offered, but declined, the Bishopric of Manchester in 1885 and after his wife's death, he was in 1888 made the first Bishop of Wakefield, and in the north of England he continued to do valuable work. His sermons were straightforward, earnest and attractive; and besides publishing several volumes of these, he wrote a good deal of verse, including such well-known hymns as Who is this so weak and helpless, Lord, Thy children guide and keep and For All the Saints. As bishop he consecrated many churches, including the Church of St John the Divine, Calder Grove in 1892.

== Death ==
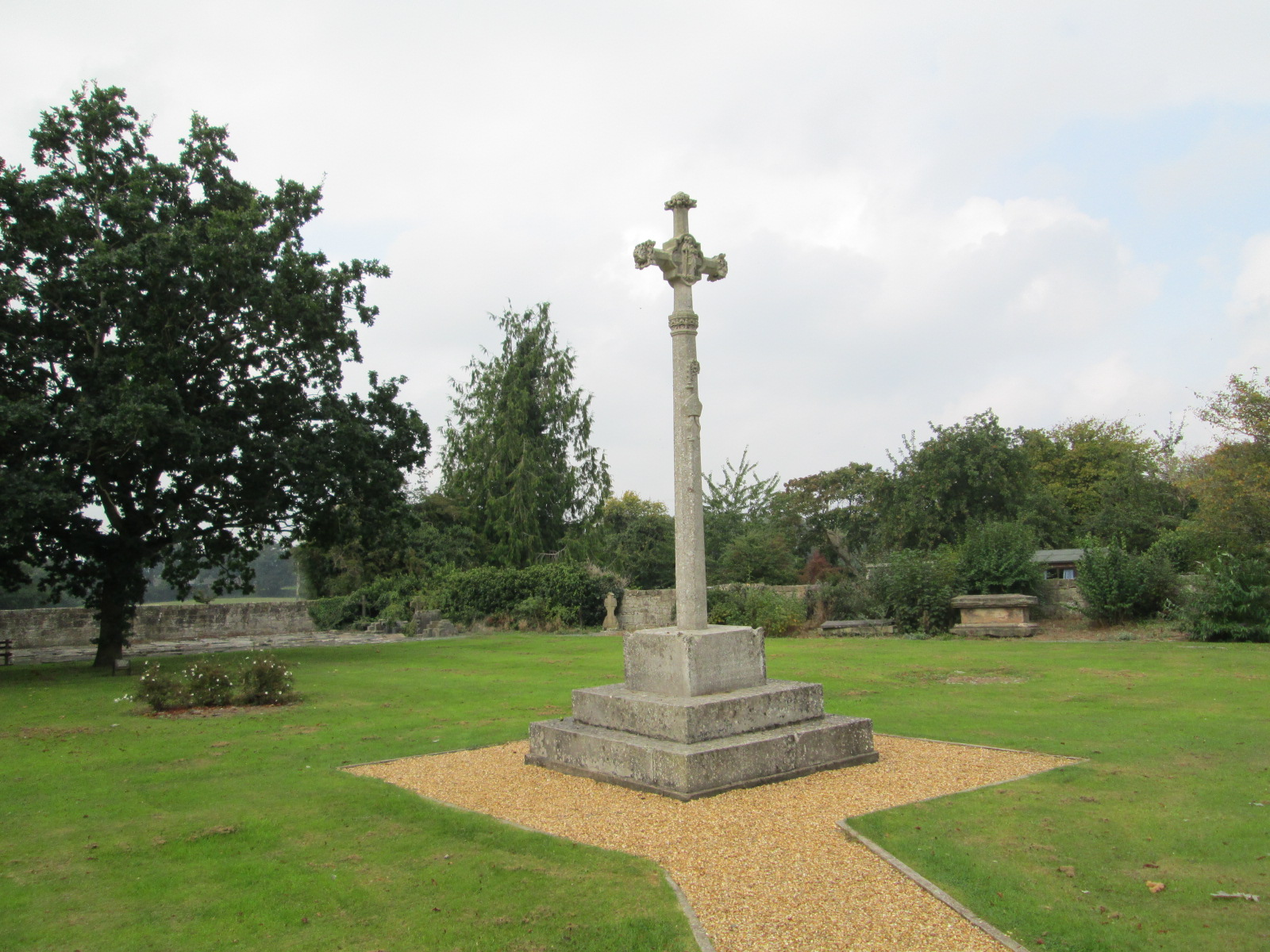
Monument to Walsham How and his wife, in the Memorial Garden near St John The Baptist's Church at Whittington, Shropshire.

He died while on holiday in Ireland, on 10 August 1897 in Leenane, County Mayo. Although there is a marble memorial to him in Wakefield Cathedral, he was buried in Whittington, Shropshire, where he had been rector for 28 years. There is also a memorial plaque to him inside the London city church of St Helen's, Bishopsgate, bearing the line "Sweet is the calm of Paradise the blest" from his hymn, "For all the saints".

== Hymns ==
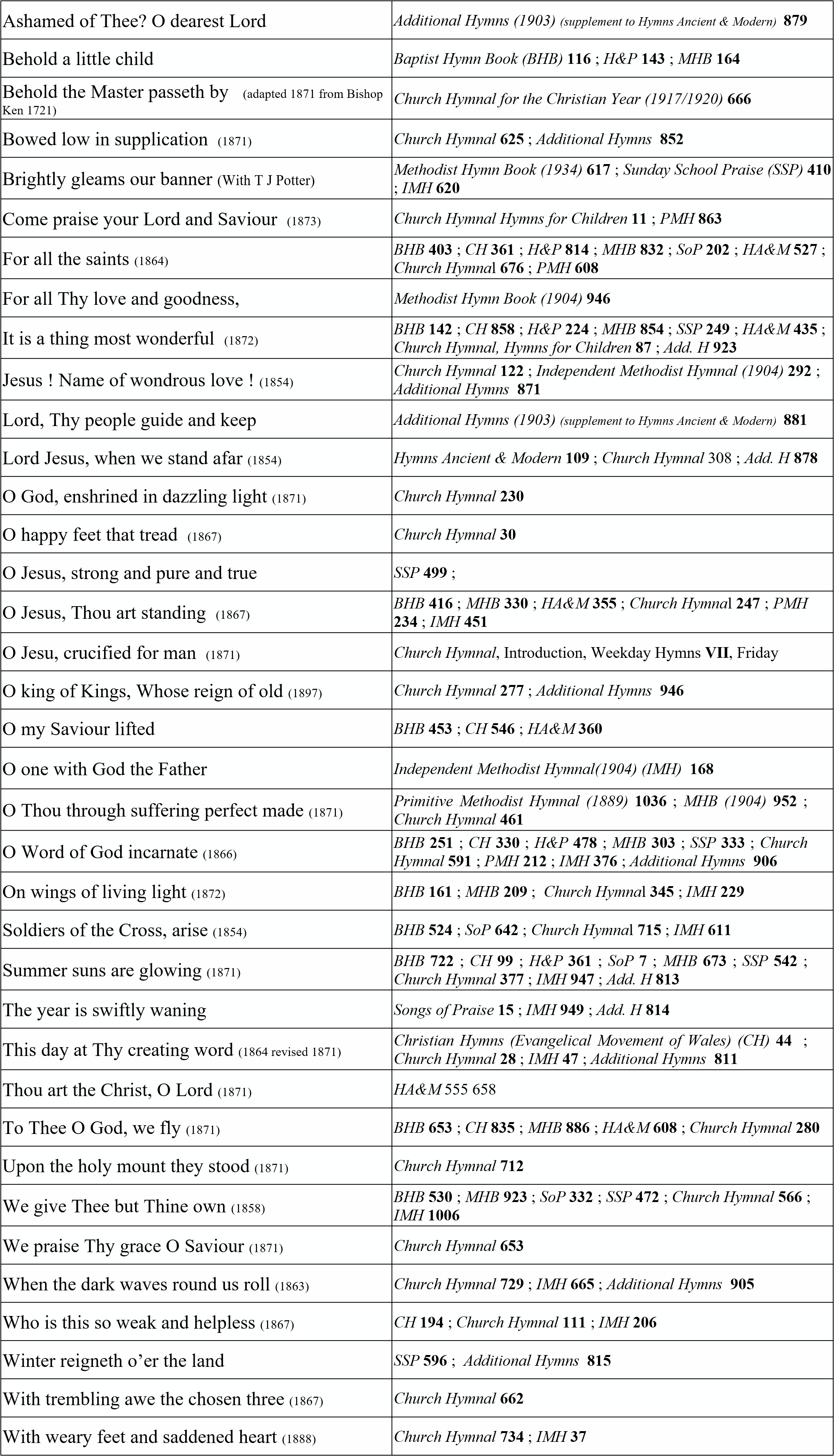
Table listing of William Walsham How located in various hymn books

A careful search of hymn books gives at least 36 of his hymns published for wider circulation. The Church Hymnal for the Christian Year (1917 revised 1920) has the greatest number, 26 in total plus another 2 which were amended by How. The Baptist Hymn Book of 1964 has 11 hymns.

The Church Hymnal gives dates for hymns. From these, the most prolific year for How's hymn writing was 1871, the date given for 10 of his hymns. This was during his time at Whittington.

How is represented in The Church Hymn Book (1872) with three hymns:

- Jesus! name of wondrous love (n. 794), 1854,
- Soldiers of the cross, arise (n. 1212), 1854,
- We give thee but thine own (n. 1264), 1854;

and in Hymns Ancient and Modern, Revised edition with several others

- Lord Jesus, when we stand afar (n. 109),
- O Jesu, thou art standing (n. 355),
- O my Saviour, lifted from the earth for me (n. 360),
- It is a thing most wonderful (n. 435),
- For all the Saints, who from their labours rest (n. 527),
- "Thou art the Christ, O Lord" (n. 555),
- To Thee, Our God, we fly (n. 606).

== Depictions ==
How appears as a significant character in Bernard Pomerance's 1979 Broadway play The Elephant Man. In a 1982 television adaptation he was played by William Hutt.

Religious titles
Preceded by diocese created	Bishop of Wakefield; 1889–1897	Succeeded by Rodney Eden
