= Tony Robinson (bishop) =

British Anglican bishop (born 1956)

The Right Reverend Tony Robinson SSC
- area Bishop of Wakefield
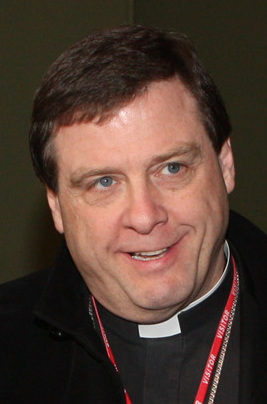
- Robinson in 2012
- Church: Church of England
- Diocese: Leeds (2014–2024); Wakefield (2002–2014)
- In office: 2002–2024
- Predecessor: David James
- Other posts: Archdeacon of Pontefract (1997–2002); Bishop of Pontefract (name changed 2015)

Orders
- Ordination: 1982 (deacon) by Brian Masters; 1983 (priest)
- Consecration: 6 December 2002 by David Hope

Personal details
- Born: 25 April 1956 (age 70) Bedford, Bedfordshire, United Kingdom
- Denomination: Anglican
- Residence: Pontefract House, Wakefield
- Spouse: (m. 1981)
- Children: three
- Profession: formerly teacher

Anthony William Robinson SSC (born 25 April 1956) is a British retired Anglican bishop. From 2015 until his 2024 retirement, he has been the area Bishop of Wakefield in the Diocese of Leeds. From 2002 to 2015, he served as Bishop of Pontefract in the Diocese of Wakefield.

== Early life and education ==
Robinson was educated at Bedford Modern School, then an all-boys independent school. He trained as a teacher at Bedford College of Higher Education, and then taught maths and computer science in Chelmsford. After two years teaching, he left to train for the priesthood at Salisbury and Wells Theological College for the next three years.

== Ordained ministry ==
Robinson was made a deacon at Petertide 1982 (27 June) by Brian Masters, Bishop of Fulham, at Christ Church, Southgate, and ordained a priest in 1983. His ministry began with a curacy at St Paul's, Tottenham. He was then Rural Dean of North Leicester. He served as the Archdeacon of Pontefract from 1997 to 2002.

=== Episcopal ministry ===
Robinson was consecrated to the episcopate on 6 December 2002, by David Hope, Archbishop of York, at York Minster. From 2002 until 2014, Robinson was suffragan Bishop of Pontefract in the Diocese of Wakefield.

In 2014, the Diocese of Leeds was created. Upon the dissolution of the Wakefield diocese and the erection of the Leeds diocese, Robinson became area bishop for the Wakefield area. His title remained Bishop of Pontefract until that see was translated to Wakefield (i.e. the title changed to Bishop of Wakefield) by Order in Council of 19 March 2015. He also provides alternative episcopal oversight under the House of Bishops' Declaration on the Ministry of Bishops and Priests throughout the whole of the Diocese of Leeds.

Robinson is the patron of Street Angels – Christian Nightlife Initiatives, a post held since 2010.

On 3 April 2024, it was announced that Robinson intended to retire effective 31 August.

=== Views ===
As of late March 2014 he is the only bishop in the Church of England to have voted in his diocesan synod against new legislation which could enable women to become bishops. In 2014, he became chairman of Forward in Faith, an Anglican movement that promotes "catholic order and the catholic doctrine of the Sacraments, and in particular the threefold ministry in historic succession, which the Church of England shares with the Church throughout the world and across the ages." He also served as chairman of the Council of Bishops of The Society. He stood down from both of these positions on Saint Andrew's Day 2023, to be succeeded by Paul Thomas at Forward in Faith and Jonathan Baker at The Society.

== Personal life ==
Robinson has been married since 1981 and has three children.

== Styles ==
- The Reverend Tony Robinson (1983–1994)
- The Reverend Canon Tony Robinson (1994–1997)
- The Venerable Tony Robinson (1997–2002)
- The Right Reverend Tony Robinson (2002–present)

Church of England titles
Preceded by David James	Bishop of Pontefract; 2002–2015	Succeeded by himself as area Bishop of Wakefield
Preceded by himself as Bishop of Pontefract	area Bishop of Wakefield; 2015–2024	TBA
