= Tom Longworth =

British bishop (1891–1977)

Tom Longworth was a 20th-century Anglican bishop.

He was born on 8 January 1891 and educated at Shrewsbury and University College, Oxford and ordained in 1916. From 1927 to 1935 he was the Rector of Guisborough and then Benwell before his ordination to the episcopate as the second Bishop of Pontefract, with the additional title of Archdeacon of the area. Translated to Hereford in 1949 he retired in 1961 and died on 15 October 1977.

== Notes ==
Church of England titles
Preceded by Campbell Richard Hone	Bishop of Pontefract; 1939 – 1949	Succeeded by Arthur Harold Morris
Preceded by Richard Godfrey Parsons	Bishop of Hereford; 1949 – 1961	Succeeded by Mark Allin Hodson
