= Arthur Morris (bishop) =

- Bishop of St Edmundsbury and Ipswich
- Diocese: Diocese of St Edmundsbury and Ipswich
- In office: 1954–1965
- Predecessor: Richard Brook
- Successor: Leslie Brown
- Other posts: Bishop of Pontefract and Archdeacon of Pontefract (1949–1954)

Orders
- Ordination: 1922 (deacon); 1923 (priest) by William Wand
- Consecration: 1949

Personal details
- Born: 20 February 1898
- Died: 15 October 1977 (aged 79) Ipswich, Suffolk, United Kingdom
- Denomination: Anglican
- Residence: Holbrook, Suffolk (at death)
- Parents: E. H. Morris
- Spouse: Evelyn Woods (m. 1924; she d. 1953)
- Children: three sons
- Education: Fitzwilliam College, Cambridge

Arthur Harold Morris (20 February 1898 – 15 October 1977) was an Anglican bishop in the 20th century.

== Education and family ==
Born the son of E. H. Morris (of Ross-on-Wye, Herefordshire), Arthur was educated at Fitzwilliam College, Cambridge, taking the degrees Bachelor of Arts (BA) and Bachelor of Laws (LLB) in 1920, and proceeding Cambridge Master of Arts (MA Cantab) in 1924. Morris went straight from school into the army, and was commissioned into the King’s (Liverpool) Regiment in 1916 and became a second lieutenant in 1917. After only 113 days, he was deemed unfit for service because of a heart defect possibly resulting from an attack of pneumonia in the spring of 1915. This left him free to study and he trained for the ministry at Ridley Hall, Cambridge and was ordained a deacon on Trinity Sunday (11 June) 1922 and a priest the next Trinity Sunday (27 May). He married Evelyn Ethel Woods in 1924 and they had three sons before he was widowed in 1953.

== Priest ==
Following his title post, as assistant curate of All Soul, Harlesden, Morris' first incumbency was as Vicar of Great Clacton with Little Holland (1926–1930), after which he served the Church Pastoral-Aid Society as Metropolitan Secretary (from 1930). He then returned to vicaring, at St Mark's Hamilton Terrace (in Marylebone, London, from 1933), later (1939–1946) also becoming Rural Dean of the St Marylebone area. He was as an RAF chaplain in World War II (1940–1945) and served, briefly, as a Proctor in Convocation for London in 1945. After the war had ended — in 1946 —, he became both Archdeacon of Halifax and a canon (of St Hilda) of Wakefield Cathedral, and was elected a Proctor for that diocese.

== Bishop ==
In 1949, he was moved to a different archdeaconry and canonry of the same diocese and cathedral — Archdeacon of Pontefract and St Chad's canon — and additionally appointed to the episcopate as the third Bishop of Pontefract, the bishop suffragan of the diocese. His appointment to the suffragan See was approved in August 1949 and he was ordained and consecrated a bishop on All Saints' Day (1 November) at York Minster. Morris was appointed Bishop of St Edmundsbury and Ipswich after it had been vacant for over one year. The diocese had expressed a wish not to have an administrator like the retired bishop but ‘a man of God’. At that time, the Prime Minister was the key figure in the appointment process and, advised by Archbishop Fisher, eventually offered the post to Morris after it had been refused by the Dean of Bristol. In recommending Morris, Fisher wrote ‘His strength lies in his pastoral work. He is sensible, practical and devout, and though he is no great preacher or theologian, he commends himself to his flock by his character and disposition.’ Morris was installed at St Edmundsbury Cathedral on 22 July 1954. He was awarded the Lambeth degree of Doctor of Divinity (DD) the same year and entered the House of Lords as a Lord Spiritual in 1959. Morris resigned in September, 1965, following a stroke. A measure of his success was that when it came to a choice of a successor, the diocese sought a ‘pastorally-minded’ bishop like Morris. Leslie Brown, Archbishop of Uganda, pastor and theologian, was appointed.

In 1971, Morris wrote a short biographical note in which he described a diocese of nearly 500 parishes. ‘I regarded my work definitely as a pastoral bishop and it was my hope that I should be able to visit all the clergy, understand their difficulties and help them in any way possible to do their work efficiently. In other words, I regarded myself as a friend to all’. He died at Holbrook, Suffolk on 15 October 1977.

Church of England titles
Preceded by Tom Longworth	Bishop of Pontefract; 1949–1954	Succeeded by George Clarkson
Preceded by Richard Brook	Bishop of St Edmundsbury and Ipswich; 1954–1965	Succeeded by Leslie Brown
