= George Clarkson =

Anglican bishop (1897–1977)

George William Clarkson (11 December 1897 – 15 August 1977) was an Anglican bishop in the 20th century.

Clarkson was educated at New College, Oxford and ordained in 1927. He was then successively a curate in Wigan, Vicar of Aspull, Sub Dean of St Albans Cathedral (and Rural Dean of Dunstable) before his ordination to the episcopate as the fourth Bishop of Pontefract with the additional title of Archdeacon of Pontefract. In 1961, in controversial circumstances not of his own making (many had expected the Provost of Guildford to succeed), he became Dean of Guildford, a position he held for seven years. In retirement he continued to serve as an assistant bishop in the Diocese of Lincoln until his death.

Religious titles
Preceded by Arthur Harold Morris	Bishop of Pontefract; 1954 – 1961	Succeeded by Eric Treacy
Preceded by Inaugural appointment	Dean of Guildford; 1961 – 1968	Succeeded by Anthony Cyprian Bridge
