= Gordon Fallows =

William Gordon Fallows KCVO (1913 – 17 August 1979) was a Church of England bishop from the broad church tradition. He served as the sixth suffragan Bishop of Pontefract and subsequently fourth diocesan Bishop of Sheffield. He is also known for having chaired the working party which produced the "Sheffield Report" used to allocate clergy numbers between the dioceses of the Church of England.

== Personal life and education ==
Fallows was born in 1913 in Barrow-in-Furness. He attended Barrow Grammar School and then St Edmund Hall, Oxford. He trained for ordination at Ripon Hall, Oxford. He died in office in August 1979 after suffering from cancer and Parkinson's disease.

== Ministry positions ==
Curate in Leamington Spa

Vicar of Styvechale, Coventry

Vicar of Preston, Lancashire

Archdeacon of Lancaster

Principal of Ripon Hall, Oxford 1959 – 1968

Bishop of Pontefract 1968 – 71

Bishop of Sheffield 1971 – 79

Vice Chairman of the Church's Central Board of Finance

Vice Chairman Church of England Pensions Board

Chaplain to the Queen

Clerk of the Closet 1975 – 79

Fallows chaired the Clergy Deployment Commission, created to address the concentration of Church of England clergy in London and the south-east of England. In 1974 it produced the Sheffield Report recommending a formula to calculate what proportion of available clergy each diocese should receive, known as the Sheffield Number. Although at the time it was "denounced by some critics as striking at the roots of the church" it remains in use as of 2008.

== Biography ==
Gordon Fallows of Sheffield, John S. Peart-Binns, The Memoir Club ISBN 978-1-84104-183-4
