= Archdeacon of Halifax =

Church of England ecclesiastical office

The Archdeacon of Halifax is the priest in charge of the archdeaconry of Halifax, an administrative division of the Church of England Diocese of Leeds (formerly in the Diocese of Wakefield.)

== History ==
The Archdeaconry was founded (from the Archdeaconry of Craven in the Diocese of Ripon, plus three parishes of the Archdeaconry of York) with the erection of the Diocese of Wakefield on 20 November 1888. From then until its reorganisation in 1927, the archdeaconry of Huddersfield comprised all but the northwestern corner of that diocese. In 1927, the archdeaconry was renamed to that of Halifax and its borders moved to cover the western half of the diocese (the old Halifax archdeaconry became the archdeaconry of Pontefract).

The (second) archdeaconry of Halifax has constituted the western half of the diocese since the 1927 reorganisation, covering the deaneries of Calder Valley, Halifax, Brighouse and Elland, Huddersfield, Almondbury and Kirkheaton. Since the creation of the Diocese of Leeds on 20 April 2014, the archdeaconry forms the Huddersfield episcopal area.

== List of archdeacons ==
=== Archdeacons of Huddersfield ===
- 1888–1892 (res.): Norman Straton
- April 1892 – 1913 (ret.): William Donne
- 1914–1927: Richard Harvey (became Archdeacon of Halifax)

=== Archdeacons of Halifax ===
With the diocesan reorganisation of 1927, the archdeaconry was renamed to Halifax.

- 1927–1935 (ret.): Richard Harvey (previously Archdeacon of Huddersfield)
- 1935–1946 (ret.): Albert Baines
- 1946–1949 (res.): Arthur Morris
- 1949–1961 (res.): Eric Treacy
- 1961–1972 (res.): John Lister
- 1972–1984 (ret.): John Alford (afterwards archdeacon emeritus)
- 1985–1989 (res.): Alan Chesters
- 1989–1994 (res.): David Hallatt
- 1995–2003 (res.): Richard Inwood (became Bishop suffragan of Bedford)
- 2003–28 October 2011 (res.): Robert Freeman
- 22 January 2012 – 31 October 2021 (ret.): Anne Dawtry
- 27 February 2022 – present: Bill Braviner
