= Heinz Werner Zimmermann =

German composer (1930–2022)

- Born: 11 August 1930; Freiburg im Breisgau, Baden, Germany
- Died: 25 January 2022 (aged 91); Oberursel, Hesse, Germany
- Education: Kirchenmusikalisches Institut Heidelberg; Freiburg Conservatory
- Occupations: Composer; Academic teacher
- Organizations: Kirchenmusikalisches Institut Heidelberg; Spandauer Kirchenmusikschule; Frankfurt University of Music and Performing Arts
- Awards: Villa Massimo; Honorary doctorate from the Wittenberg University in Springfield

Heinz Werner Zimmermann (11 August 1930 – 25 January 2022) was a German composer, focused on contemporary sacred music. He was professor of composition at the Spandauer Kirchenmusikschule and the Frankfurt University of Music and Performing Arts, and held several honorary doctorates from the Wittenberg University in Springfield, Ohio, U.S., and from Leipzig University. He is known for church music influenced by jazz, such as motets for choir with plucked bass.

== Life ==
Zimmermann was born in Freiburg im Breisgau and had his first composition instruction from 1946 to 1948 with Julius Weismann. He studied from 1950 to 1954 at the Kirchenmusikalisches Institut Heidelberg (Institute for Church Music) in Heidelberg, with Wolfgang Fortner. After passing his examinations at the Freiburg Conservatory, supervised by Harald Genzmer, he became Fortner's successor in Heidelberg immediately. Here he maintained close contacts with the musicologist Thrasybulos Georgiades, whose rhythm and language studies influenced him the most, along with his occupation with American spirituals and jazz.

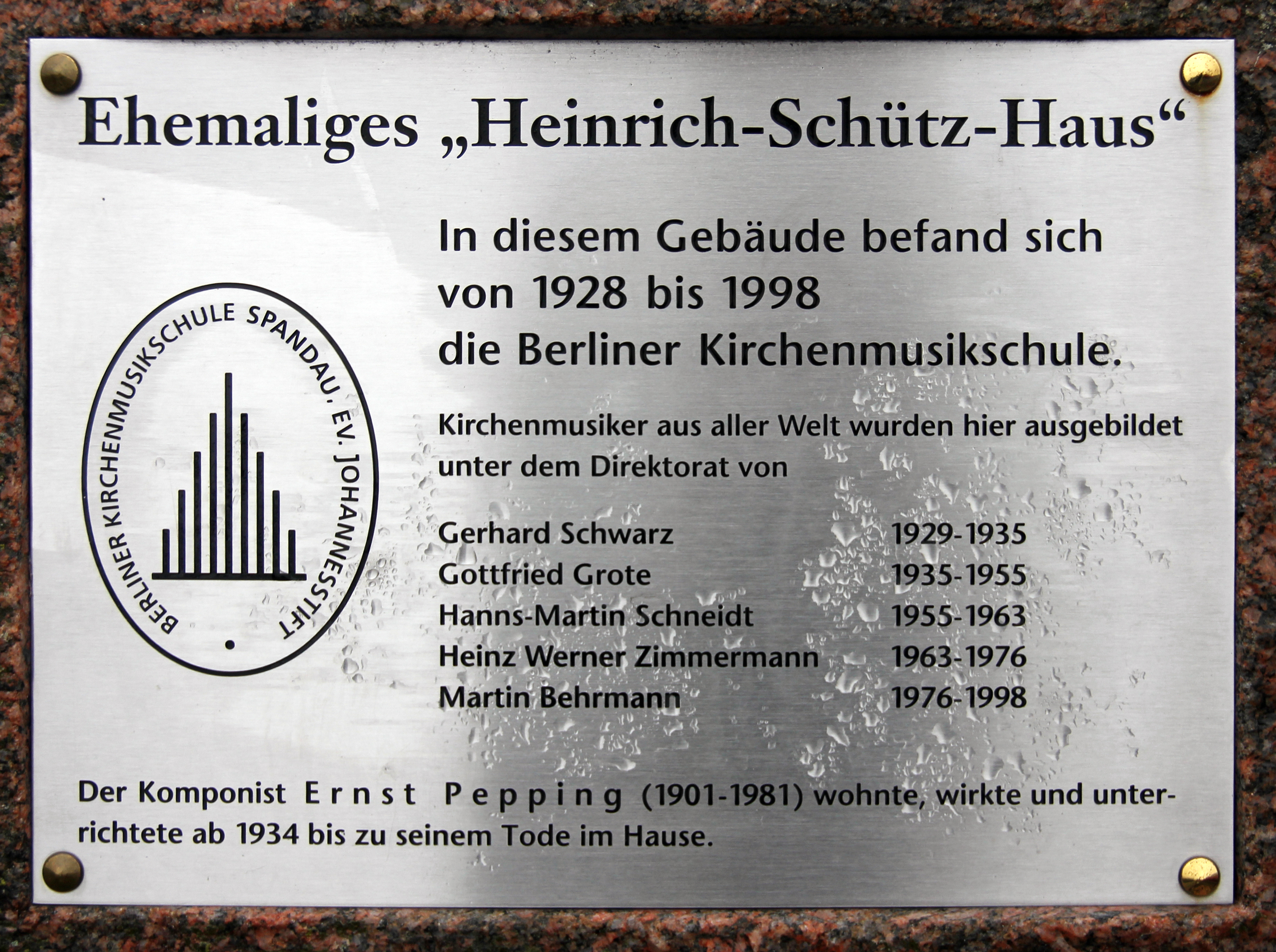
Memorial plaque for the Spandauer Kirchenmusikschule

From 1963 to 1976, Zimmermann was director of the Spandauer Kirchenmusikschule (Spandau school of church music) in Spandau, and then from 1975 to 1996 as successor to Kurt Hessenberg as composition teacher at the Frankfurt University of Music and Performing Arts.

=== Personal life ===
Zimmermann was married to the organist Renate Zimmermann. They lived in Oberursel, where he died on 25 January 2022, at the age of 91.

== Works ==
Zimmermann's best-known works are his sacred motets with plucked double bass, his organ psalms, and his "Prosalieder". One of his chief works is the Missa profana which he created over 15 years, set for a vocal quartet, choir, dixieland jazz band, tape, and large orchestra. Completed in 1980, it was premiered in Minneapolis in 1981. Others are the sacred oratorio The Bible of Spirituals, Te Deum, and Symphonia sacra. His Don-Giovanni-Variationen for orchestra premiered in Frankfurt in 2020.

== Awards ==
Amongst other honours, Zimmermann was awarded the Music Prizes of Berlin, a Villa Massimo scholarship in 1965/66, and he received the Johann Sebastian Bach Prize of Stuttgart in 1982. The American Wittenberg University in Springfield bestowed upon him an honorary doctorate, followed by three American theses dedicated to his work, including one at the Stanford University in California. In 2009, he received the honorary doctorate from Leipzig University. In 2012, he was awarded the Order of Merit of the Federal Republic of Germany.
