= Diocese of Wakefield =

Church of England diocese, 1888 to 2014

Coordinates: 53.680°N 1.500°W

- Coat of arms

Location
- Ecclesiastical province: York
- Archdeaconries: Halifax, Pontefract

Statistics
- Parishes: 188
- Churches: 234

Information
- Established: 18 May 1888–20 April 2014
- Cathedral: Wakefield Cathedral

Current leadership
- Bishop: At dissolution: Stephen Platten, Bishop of Wakefield
- Suffragan: At dissolution: Tony Robinson, Bishop of Pontefract
- Archdeacons: At dissolution: Peter Townley, Archdeacon of Pontefract; Dr Anne Dawtry, Archdeacon of Halifax

Website
- wakefield.anglican.org

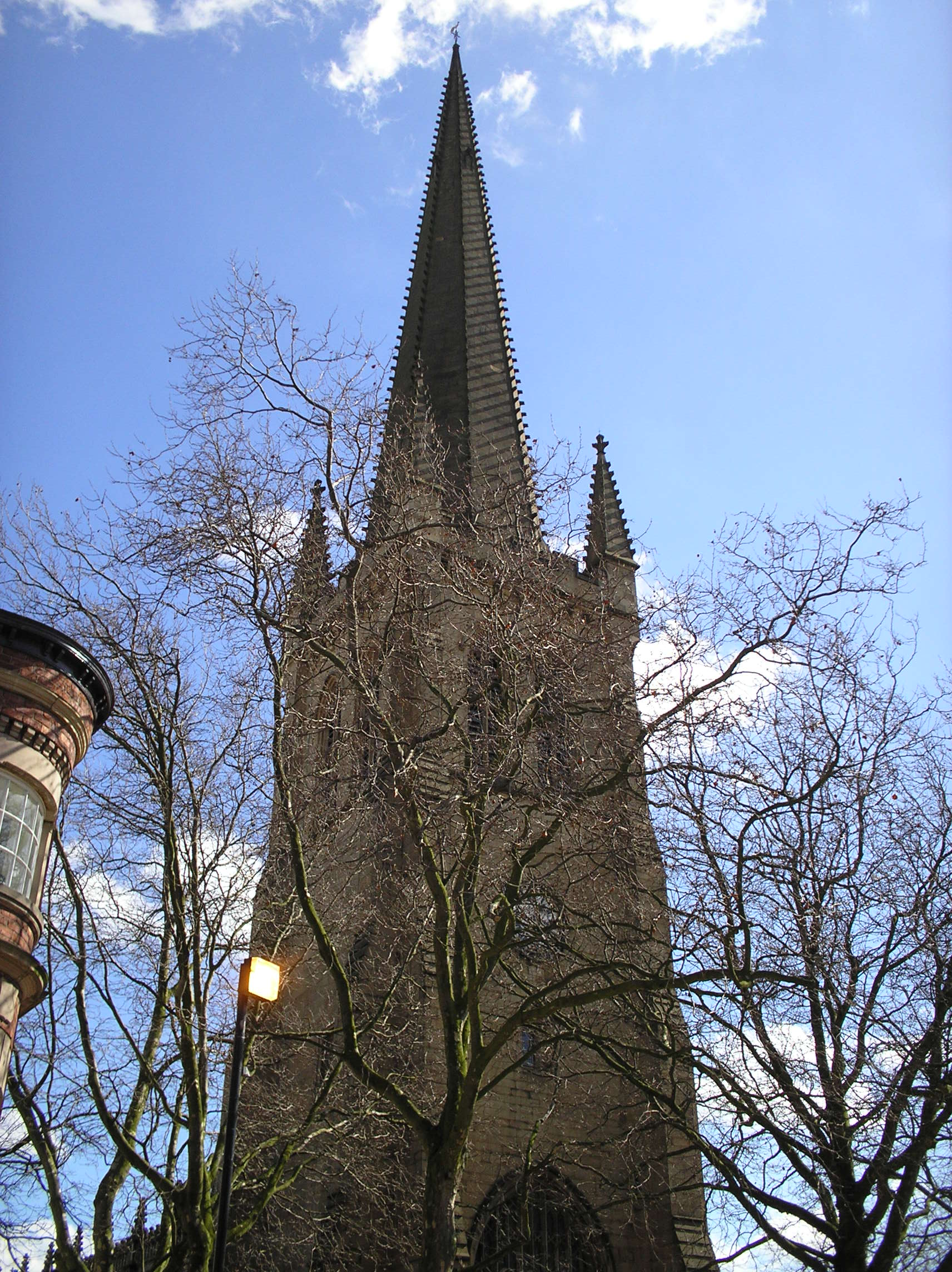
The spire of the Cathedral Church of All Saints, Wakefield

The Diocese of Wakefield is a former Church of England diocese based in Wakefield in West Yorkshire, covering Wakefield, Barnsley, Kirklees and Calderdale. The cathedral was Wakefield Cathedral and the bishop was the diocesan Bishop of Wakefield.

The Diocese of Wakefield was created out of the Diocese of Ripon in 1888 in response to the rapid expansion in population due to the Industrial Revolution. Immediately prior to its dissolution it extended north to south from the suburbs of Leeds to Barnsley and east to west from Kellington to Todmorden. The diocese was dissolved on 20 April 2014 by the creation of the new Diocese of Leeds.

== History ==
After discussions in the mid-1870s as to where a new diocese in the West Riding of Yorkshire should be, Wakefield, with a population of under 30,000, was chosen before Leeds and Bradford and Huddersfield and Halifax. Wakefield was then the county town of the West Riding and had a large medieval church.

The new Diocese of Wakefield was taken out of the southern part of the Diocese of Ripon, which was formed in 1836 out of the vast Diocese of York, and divided the industrial area of the West Riding separating Wakefield, Huddersfield and Halifax from Leeds and Bradford which remained in Ripon. The diocese was enlarged in 1926 to include the deaneries of Hemsworth and Pontefract from the Diocese of York.

As constituted on 18 May 1888, the diocese comprised the archdeaconries of Halifax and Huddersfield. In 1927, the archdeaconries were reorganised into the archdeaconries of Halifax and of Pontefract. The old archdeaconry of Halifax, in the northwest, the deaneries of Birstall, Halifax and Dewsbury, became the archdeaconry of Pontefract, covering the deaneries of Barnsley, Birstal, Dewsbury, Pontefract and Wakefield in the east and the archdeaconry of Huddersfield, which covered the deaneries of Hemworth, Huddersfield, Pontefract, Silkstone and Wakefield, became the new archdeaconry of Halifax, covering the west (the deaneries of Halifax and Huddersfield).

== Dissolution ==
On 2 March 2013, the diocesan synod voted against proposals to abolish the diocese in order to create a Leeds diocese however the proposal was approved on 8 July 2013 by the General Synod. The proposals came into force on 20 April 2014, at which point the Bradford, Ripon and Leeds and Wakefield dioceses were dissolved and the new Diocese of Leeds was created.

== Bibliography ==
- Church of England Statistics 2002
- The Dioceses Commission's Yorkshire Review — A Guide to the Report
