= Bruce Duncan (priest) =

Retired Anglican priest, chaplain, and academic administrator

The Reverend Canon Bruce Duncan MBE
- Principal of Sarum College
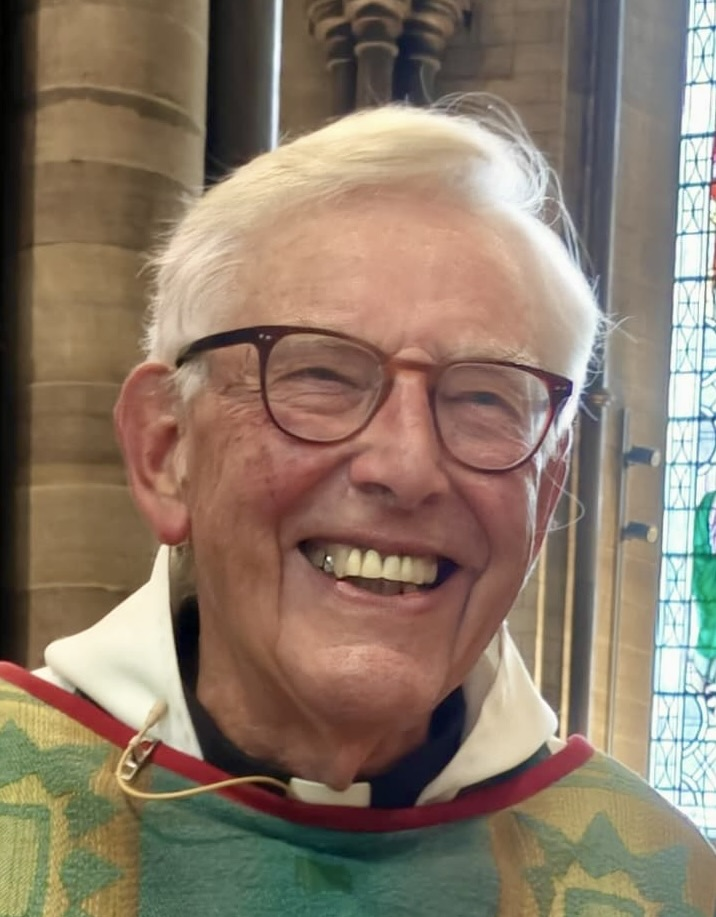
- Church: Church of England
- Diocese: Diocese of Salisbury
- In office: 1995 to 2003
- Successor: Tim Macquiban

Orders
- Ordination: 1967 (deacon) by Howard Cruse; 1968 (priest) by John Moorman

Personal details
- Born: 28 January 1938 (age 88)
- Denomination: Anglicanism
- Spouse: Margaret (m. 1966)
- Children: Three
- Education: St Albans School, Hertfordshire
- Alma mater: University of Leeds; Cuddesdon College

Bruce Duncan, MBE (born 28 January 1938) is a retired Anglican priest, chaplain, and academic administrator. From 1995 to 2002, he was the first Principal of Sarum College, an ecumenical theological college in Salisbury, England.

== Early life and education ==
Duncan was born on 28 January 1938 to Andrew Allan Duncan and of Dora Duncan (née Young). He was educated at St Albans School, then an all-boys private school in St Albans, Hertfordshire. He studied at the University of Leeds, graduating with a Bachelor of Arts (BA) degree in 1960. In 1965, he matriculated into Cuddesdon College, an Anglo-Catholic theological college near Oxford. For the next two years, he studied theology and trained for Holy Orders.

== Career ==
=== Charity work ===
Duncan's first career was in the charity sector. In 1959, he founded Children's Relief International (CRI) with Bernard Faithfull-Davies: CRI ran holiday camps for deprived children, and merged into Save the Children in the 1970s. He served as director of CRI from 1960 to 1962. He also founded the Northorpe Hall Trust in 1962, and served as its director from 1962 to 1965. Now known as the Northorpe Hall Child & Family Trust, it works with "children facing challenges to their emotional well-being and mental health".

=== Ordained ministry ===
Duncan was ordained in the Church of England as a deacon on 21 May 1967 by Howard Cruse, Bishop of Knaresborough. He was ordained as a priest on 9 June 1968 by John Moorman, Bishop of Ripon. From 1967 to 1969, he served his curacy at St Bartholomew's Church, Armley, an Anglo-Catholic church in the Diocese of Ripon and Leeds. During this time, he was also curate-in-charge of the Church of St Mary of Bethany, Leeds. He then returned to his charity work, once more as Director of Children's Relief International, and also held two short-term posts: he was honorary curate of St Mary the Less, Cambridge from 1969 to 1970, and Chaplain to the Order of the Holy Paraclete in Whitby, Yorkshire, from 1970 to 1971.

In 1971, Duncan moved to the Diocese in Europe and was based at Christ Church, Vienna. From 1971 to 1975, he also served as chaplain to the British ambassadors to Austria, to Hungary, and to Czechoslovakia.

In 1975, Duncan returned to England and joined the Diocese of Exeter as Vicar of the Church of the Holy Cross and the Mother of Him who Hung Thereon, Crediton. He was additionally Rural Dean of Cadbury between 1976 and 1981. His parish joined with another in 1982 and he became Rector of Crediton and Shobrooke. He once more served as Rural Dean of Cadbury, from 1984 to 1986.

Duncan left Devon in 1986 when he was appointed a Residentiary Canon of Manchester Cathedral. In July 1995, it was announced that he had been appointed the Director of Sarum College, an ecumenical theological college in the Diocese of Salisbury. Taking up the post that year, he was also made a Canon and Prebendary of Salisbury Cathedral. By 1998, his position had been renamed as Principal of the college. He retired from full-time ministry in September 2002, and was succeeded as principal by Tim Macquiban.

Though formally retired in 2002, Duncan has led an active retirement. He held permission to officiate in the Diocese of Exeter from 2002 to 2008. From 2003 to 2004, he was the Lazenby and St Luke's Chaplain at the University of Exeter. He has been a Commissary in the UK for the Bishop of North East Caribbean and Aruba since 2006. He has held permission to officiate in the Diocese of Salisbury since 2008 and in the Diocese in Europe since 2010. He has been an honorary curate at the Church of St Martin, Salisbury from 2010 to 2015.

== Personal life ==
In 1966, Duncan married Margaret Holmes Smith. Together they have three daughters.

== Honours ==
In the 1993 Queen's Birthday Honours, Duncan was appointed a Member of the Order of the British Empire (MBE) "for services to the Care of Young People". He was awarded an honorary Doctor of Divinity (DD) degree by the Graduate Theological Foundation in 2002. On 8 November 2004, he was awarded the Cross of St Augustine by Rowan Williams, Archbishop of Canterbury.
