= St James the Less, Pockthorpe =

Closed church in Norwich, England

Coordinates: 52.6360°N 1.3003°E

St James the Less
- St James the Less, Pockthorpe, Norwich
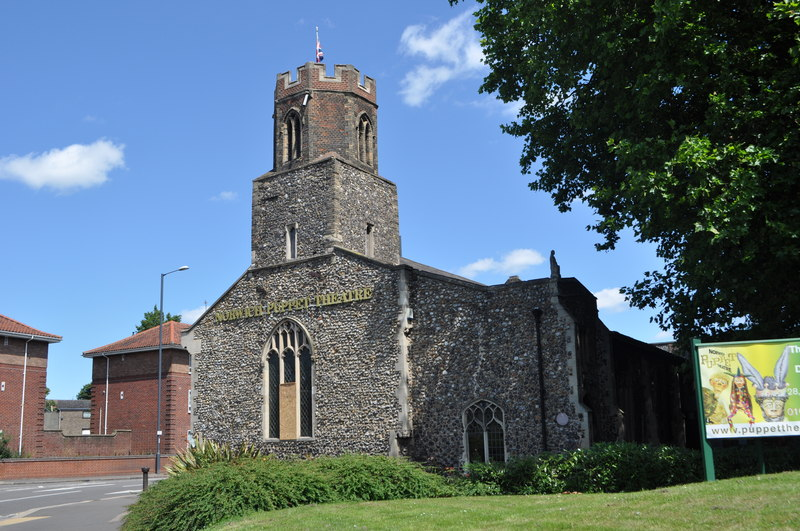
- View from the southwest
- St James the Less
- Location: Norwich, Norfolk
- Country: England

History
- Dedication: Saint James the Less (officially Saints James the Less and James the Great)

Architecture
- Functional status: Puppet theatre
- Heritage designation: Grade I listed (1954)
- Architectural type: Perpendicular Gothic

St James the Less, Pockthorpe (also once known as St James, Cowgate or St. James at Barr-gates) is a redundant church located just inside the medieval city of Norwich, Norfolk, England. First recorded in 1180, the church served a small city parish; the area it served was greatly expanded during the English Reformation to include both the hamlet of Pockthorpe (just outside the walls) and an adjoining part of Mousehold Heath. The current church may have replaced an earlier 11th- or 12th-century building.

The church was restored in 1885. It was placed in the care of the Norwich Historic Churches Trust in 1973. It became a shelter for the homeless before becoming the home of the Norwich Puppet Theatre, which opened in 1980. The church's architectural style is Perpendicular Gothic. It was built using flint, freestone, and brick. The nave is separated by piers that assist in supporting the brick-topped tower, which, being built within the church and not at the end of the nave, causes the west end to be partitioned.

Many of St James's original interior fixtures and fittings, including its medieval baptismal font, a set of 15th-century rood screen panels, and glass roundels fitted when the church was re-glazed, are now at nearby St Mary Magdalene, Norwich, which in 1972 became the church for the parish after St James was closed as a place of worship.

== History ==
=== Medieval ===
St James the Less possibly replaced an earlier building—archaeologists have found a clay boundary wall, possibly built in the 11th or 12th centuries, under the foundations of the present building. As with most of the medieval churches of Norwich, little of the building dating from the middle medieval period or earlier has survived.

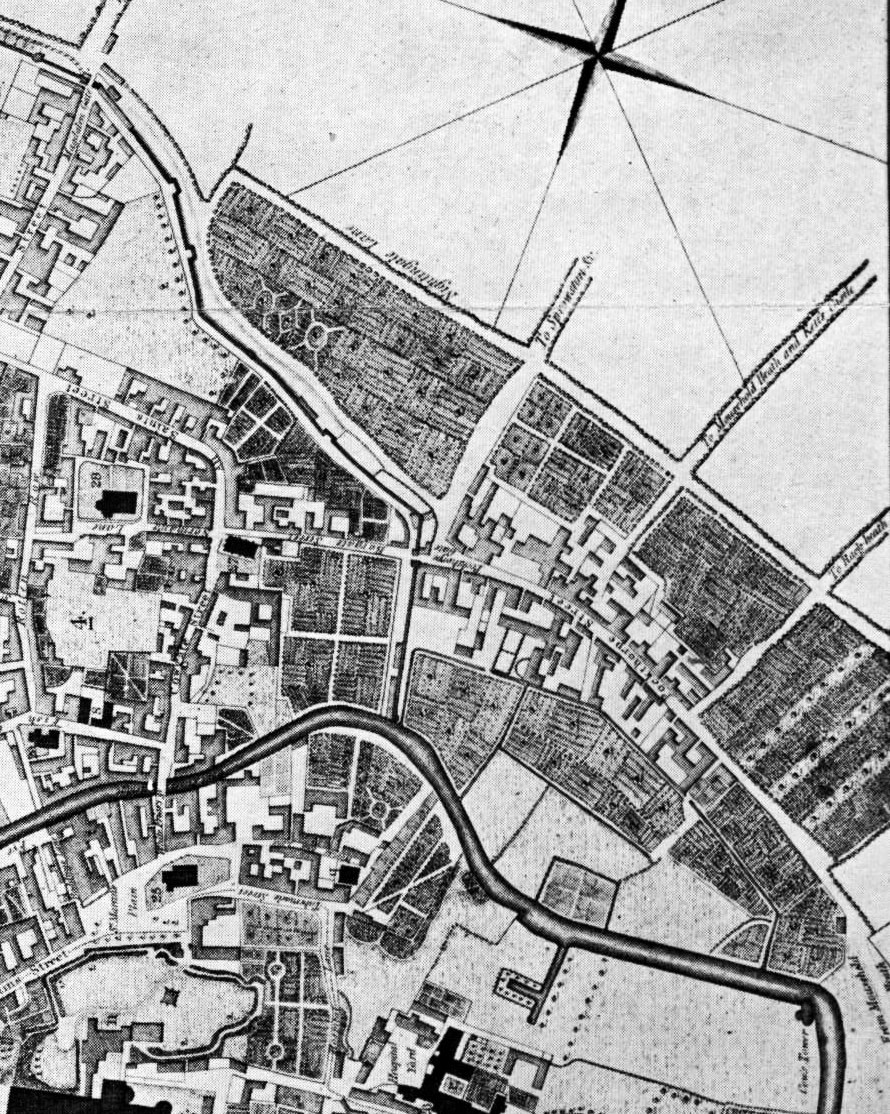
Part of Hochstetter's map of Norwich (1789). Pockthorpe is north of the river and outside the city walls, whilst St James (within the city) is located at the end of Cowgate Street.

The church, which was also previously known as St James, Cowgate, was first recorded in 1180. It is probably the church mentioned in the Domesday Book as "the church of Letha". The church is more correctly called St James the Great & St James the Less, as it was originally dedicated to both saints. Archaeological evidence suggests that it was founded at a time when the River Wensum was wider (or more marshy) than at present. According to the 18th-century English antiquary Francis Blomefield, the church was once known as St. James at Barr-gates, and the nearby hamlet outside the city was called Pockthorpe ("little Thorpe"), as it was created from part of the earlier parish of Thorpe. In 1106, the manor at Thorpe was granted to Herbert de Losinga, Bishop of Norwich, who probably also founded (and had authority over) the church. The church was once near to an Anglo-Saxon (or Anglo-Scandinavian) defensive boundary ditch that became part of the bishop's liberty. According to Blomefield:

It was a well-endowed rectory, having all the great and small tithes belonging to it, till about 1201, when it was appropriated by John de Grey Bishop of Norwich, to the prior and convent there, who by that means, got all the glebes and tithes into their hands, on condition they found a secular chaplain to serve the church, and paid him for so doing, and repaired the chancel at their cost.

In 1368, the church was valued at £1 6s 8d, by 1535 this value had more than doubled. In the late 15th century, the present church encroached on Cowgate, a street that was originally 3 metres (9.8 ft) to the east of its present position. An anchoress's cell was to the south of the churchyard was recorded in 1422.

=== Post-medieval ===
During the English Reformation, the parish of St James absorbed the parish of St Catherine, in which included chapel dedicated at one time to William of Norwich, a local boy who had been murdered and buried on Mousehold Heath in 1137. The enlarged parish included a portion of the heath, as well as the hamlet of Pockthorpe, which was across the River Wensum and on the other side of the city walls.

==== 19th century ====
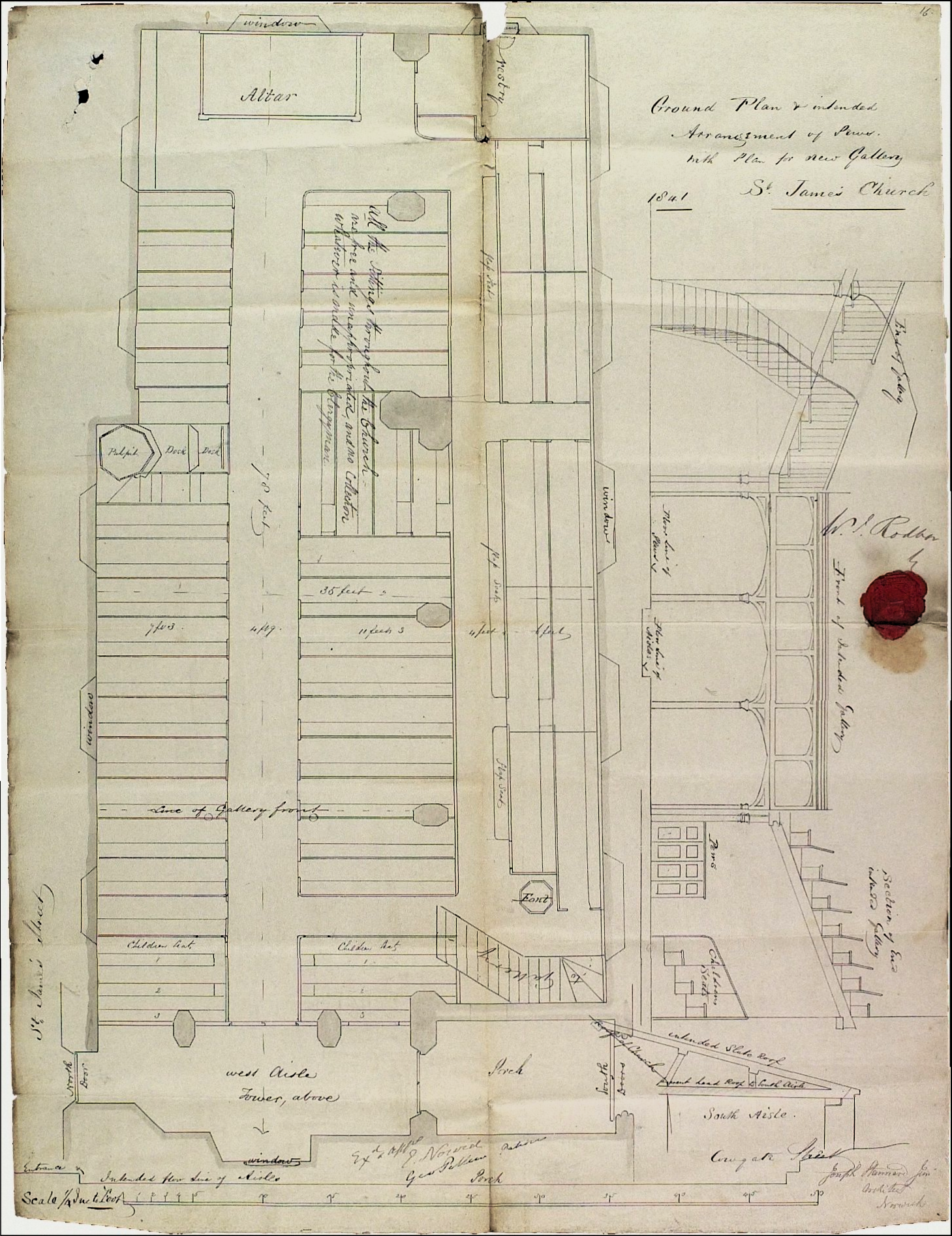
A plan of the church by the architect Joseph Stannard (1841)

On 25 March 1841, while Bell Cook was vicar of St Paul and St James with Pockthorpe, the Norwich Diocesan Association for Building and Enlarging Churches voted to donate £100 (equivalent to £8,969.57 in 2025) "in aid of a subscription for repairing and re-pewing the churches of St Paul and St James the Less with Pockthorpe... which ... [had] fallen into a state of deplorable diilapidation". Being aware of a repairs estimate of £610, (equivalent to £54,714.38 in 2025) and of the poverty of the local congregations, an appeal for additional subscriptions was made to various interested clergy and gentry. The subscriptions were received and disposed of by Rev. Cook. On 9 October 1842, St James was re-opened for services following the repairs. At the first service, Cook read the prayers, and the Bishop of Norwich delivered the sermon to a "densely crowded" congregation.

The building was thoroughly and substantially restored under the direction of Mr Joseph Stannard junr, presenting a singular neatness of appearance. 165 additional sittings [had] been obtained by a rearrangement of the pews and an extension of the gallery, all entirely new. The cost of the whole [was] upwards of £600 (raised by grants and subscription). The Lord Bishop presented a handsome altar cloth, with the appropriate initials embroidered by Miss Stanley. (Note: The architect of the 1841–1842 church repairs was Joseph Stannard Junior of Norwich (1785–1850).)

The church was altered and restored in the middle of the 19th century, and in 1885.

With the growth of Norwich during the 19th century, Pockthorpe, where most of the parish lived, became notorious for the acute poverty and poor housing conditions of its population. In 1842, Pockthorpe's only street, Barrack Street, was described in G. K. Blyth's Norwich Guide as having houses that were "mean" and "occupied by the poorer part of the citizens". At this time, St James and a neighbouring parish, St Paul, shared a curate, who performed services at each church on alternate Sundays. An 1851 report to the General Board of Health noted that wastewater from the stables of the barracks in the parish flowed along a ditch under houses in the area, and that a lack of running water caused the refuse to become stagnant.

==== 20th century – present ====
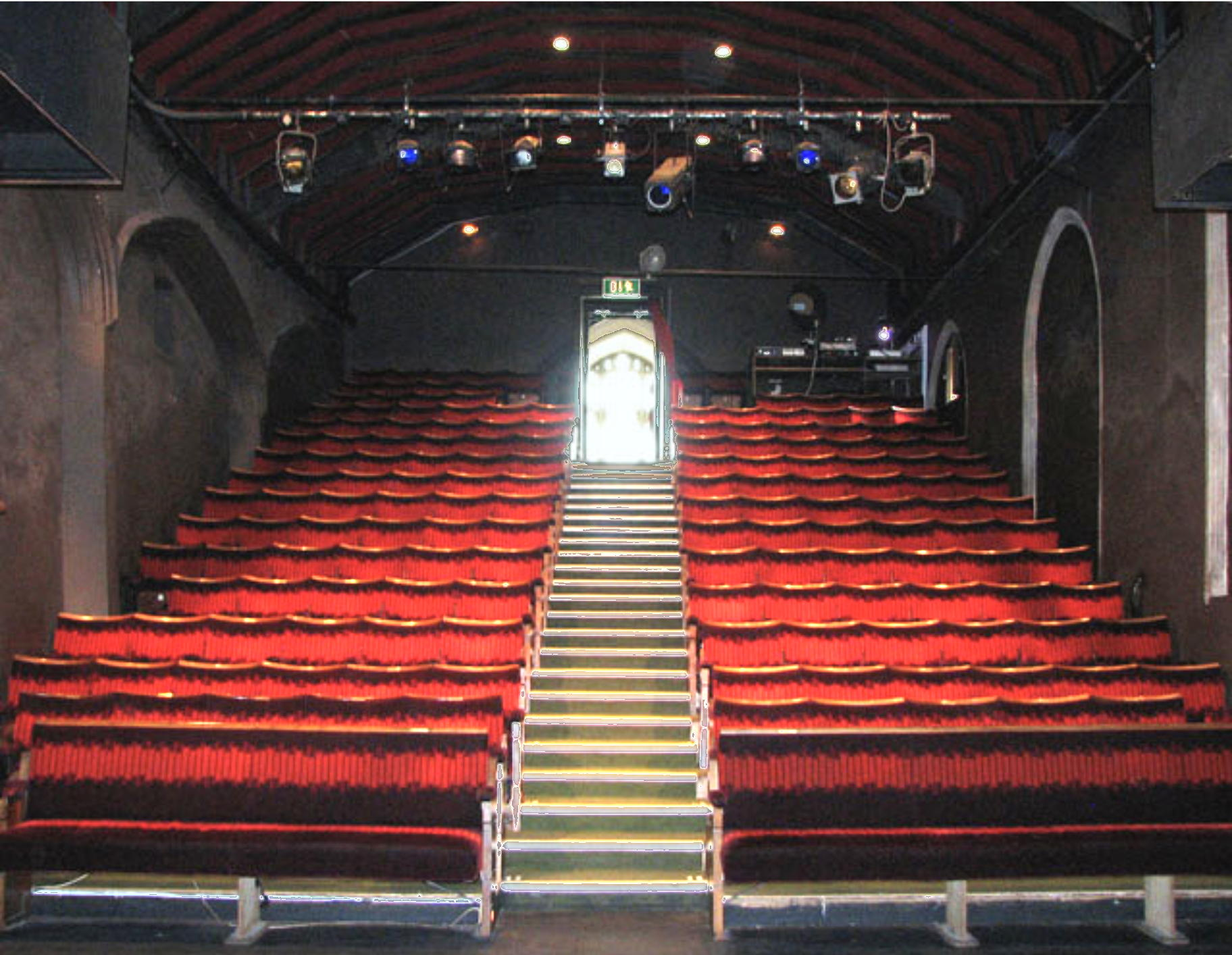
Norwich Puppet Theatre's auditorium in 2010

It took until the 1930s for the area's slums, previously considered to have been the city's worst, to be demolished; St James's Church and a part of Norwich's city wall are nearly all that remains in the area from before the Second World War.

The church is a deconsecrated former Anglican church, having closed in 1972. In 1973, the building was placed in the care of the Norwich Historic Churches Trust. From 1972 to 1976, part of the building was repurposed as a night shelter for the homeless. It is located within the modern parish of St Mary Magdalene Church, Norwich. St James is a Grade I listed building. It is listed on the UK's Heritage at Risk Register as an "A" priority building, as there is an "Immediate risk of further rapid deterioration or loss of fabric", and no solution to the issue has been agreed.

St James formerly stood within a churchyard, now lost to modern development. The building is currently occupied by the Norwich Puppet Theatre, a nationally unique venue dedicated to puppetry. The church was converted for its new use between January and March 1979, during when an archaeological watching brief was carried out. The Manpower Services Commission provided some of the workers used to convert the church. The work done involved the conversion of the nave into an auditorium using old cinema seats, and the chancel was made into a performance area. The theatre opened in 1980. In 1980, an extension was built to accommodate storage and rehearsal space. The theatre can accommodate an audience of 185.

== Architecture ==
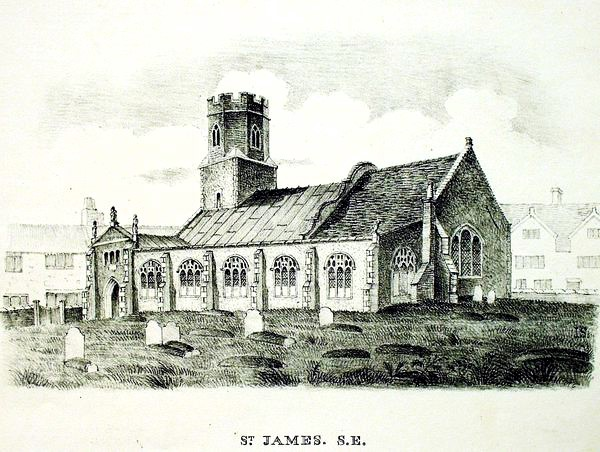
James Sillett, St James. SE (1828), Norfolk Museums Collections

The present church's architectural style is Perpendicular Gothic throughout. The nave, chancel and south aisle wall are of knapped flint, freestone, and brick. The nave has a three bays. The south aisle runs in parallel with both the nave and chancel. A fourth bay at the west end of the nave is separated by two piers that assist in supporting the brick-topped tower. The tower has three stages. It was built within the church and not at the end of the nave, so causing the west end to be partitioned. The top part of the tower was constructed in 1743; in Blomefield's time it had stone emblems of the four Evangelists at each corner.

At an unknown date, but probably during the 14th to 15th century, a porch was built. During the late 15th century the west tower-bay and the north wall were rebuilt to allow the staircase for the rood loft to be added. A wall painting on the north nave wall possibly dates from the 16th century. A new aisle was constructed and the chancel wall was rebuilt in the 16th century.

During the 18th century a new south porch was constructed in the angle between the west end of the nave and the south aisle. The porch once had pinnacles in the form of seated figures, but only one pinnacle remains. Blomefield (1805) states that the tower was restored in 1743.

The original stained glass windows date from the 15th century. Apart from those on the east side, they are Perpendicular. The east window has tracery dating to the Decorated period. The windows were re-glazed in 1954 and 1960, when roundels were incorporated from the collection of the Norwich glazier Dennis King. Several are now at St Mary Magdalene, Norwich, including a 16th-century Flemish roundel depicting the parable of the rich man and Lazarus.

== Original furnishings, fixtures and possessions ==
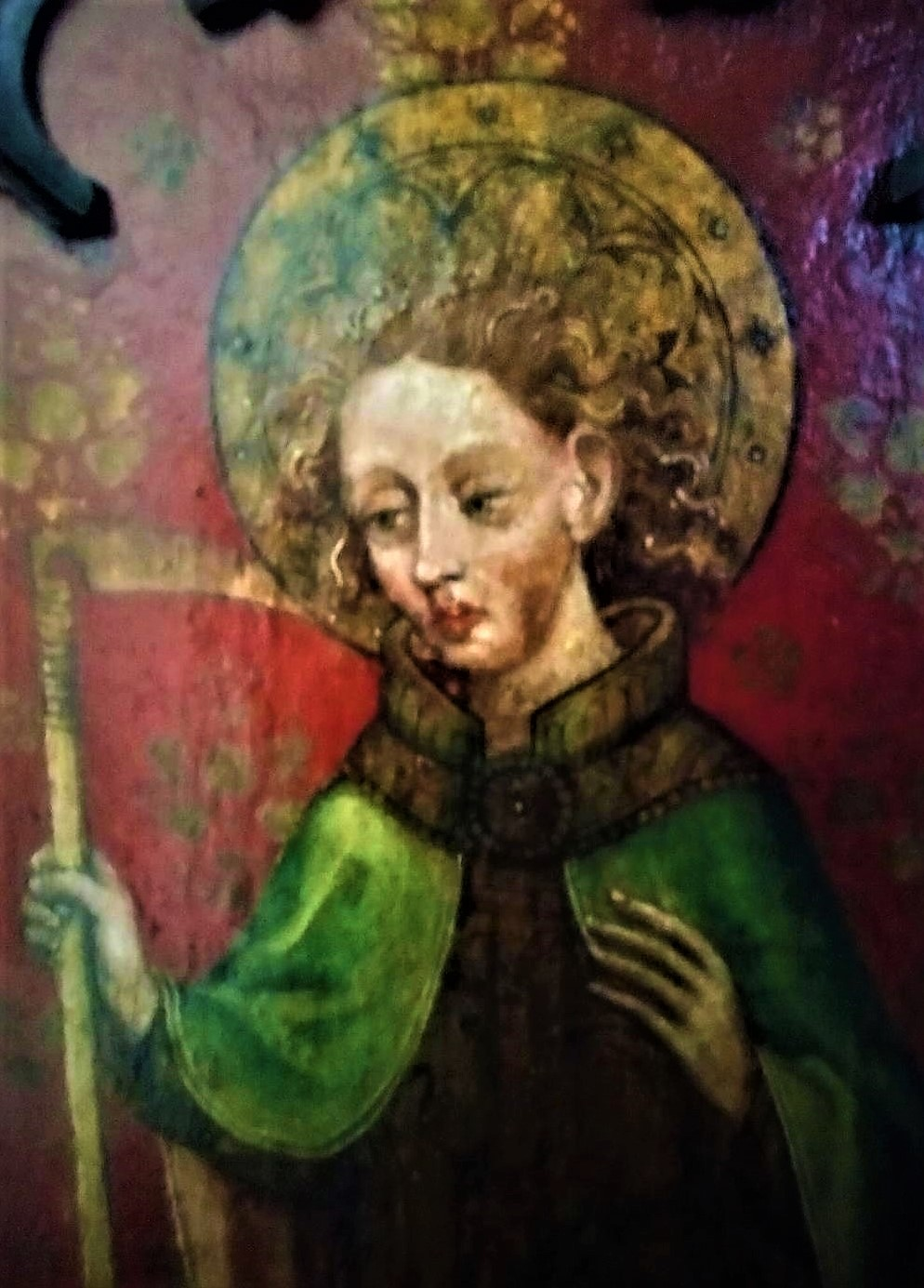
Detail of a rood screen panel depicting St Walstan, now at St Mary Magdalene

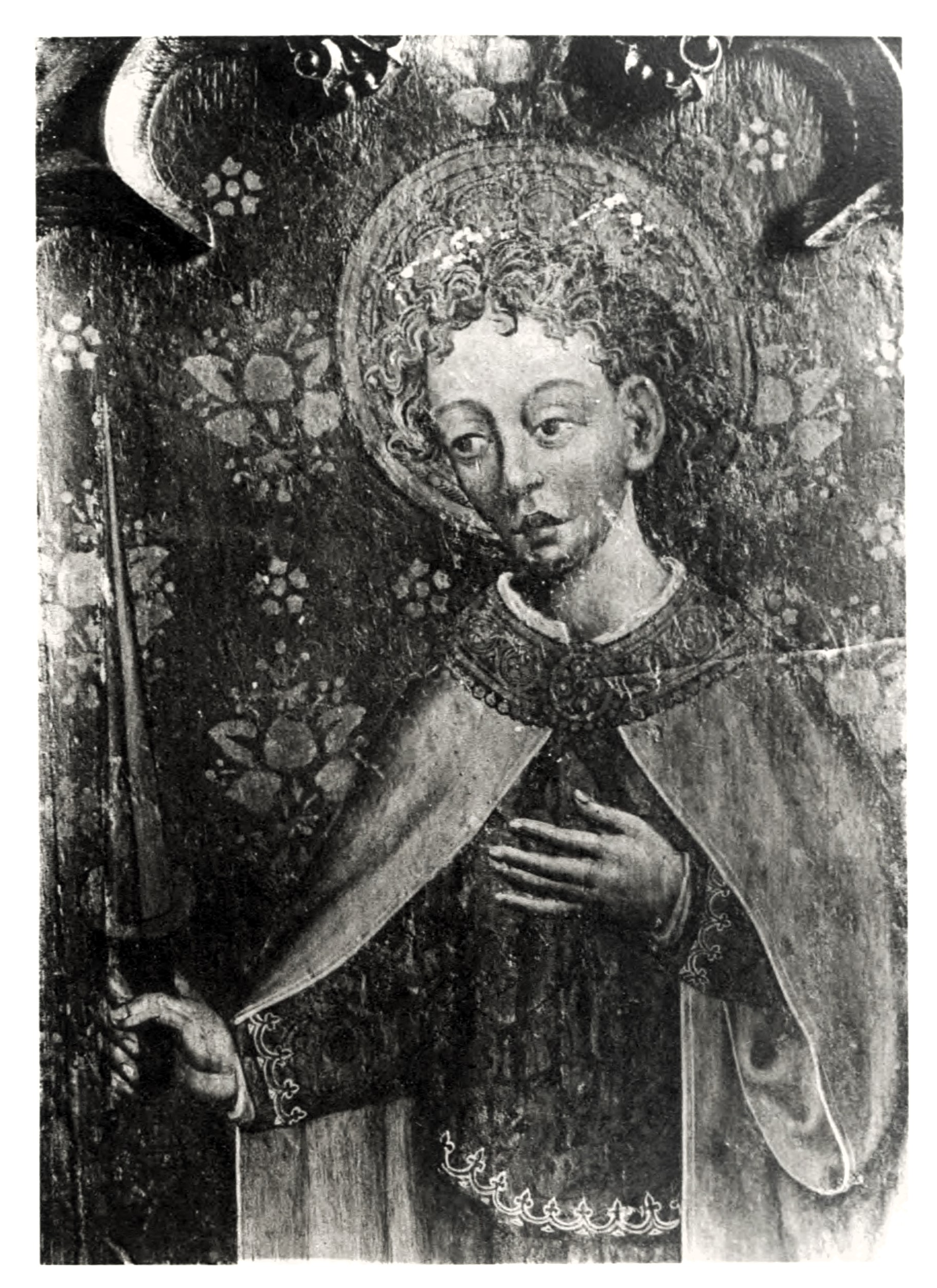
An 1896 photograph of the William of Norwich panel

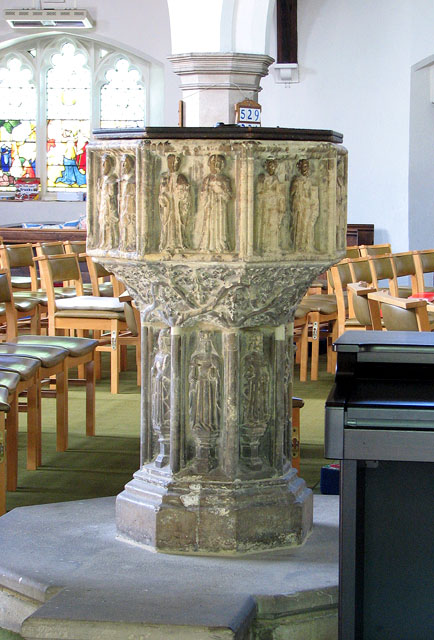
The baptismal font from St James, now in St Mary Magdalene, Norwich

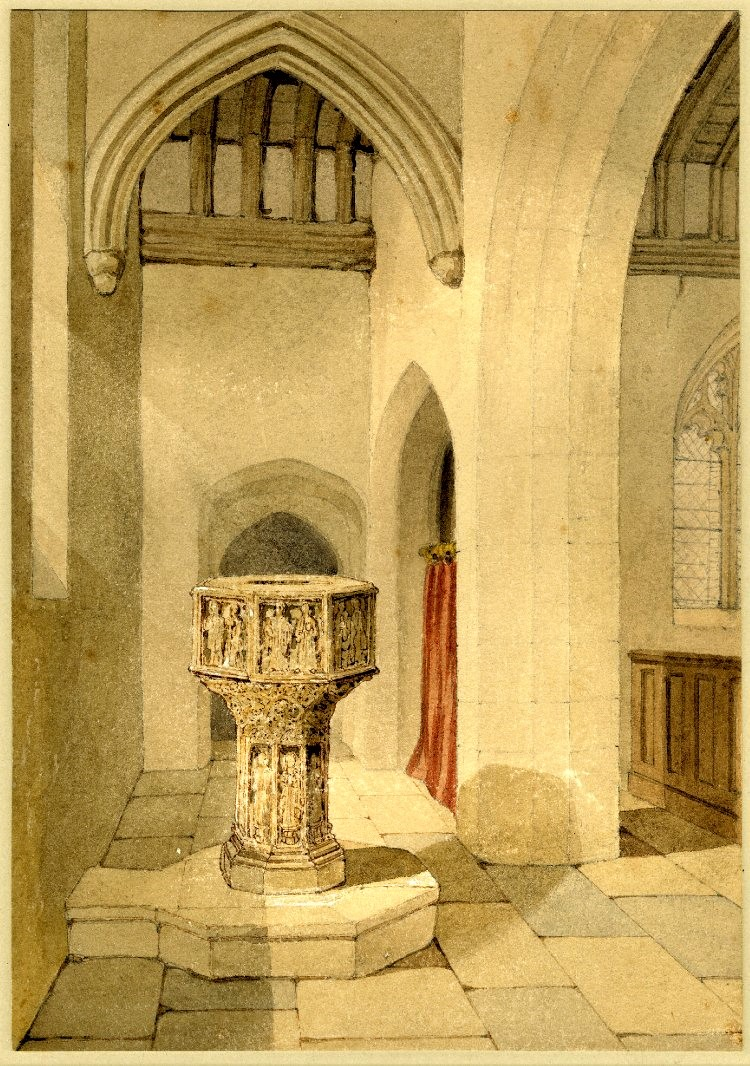
Henry Ninham, Interior of St. James's Church, Norfolk, (before 1874), Norfolk Museums Collections

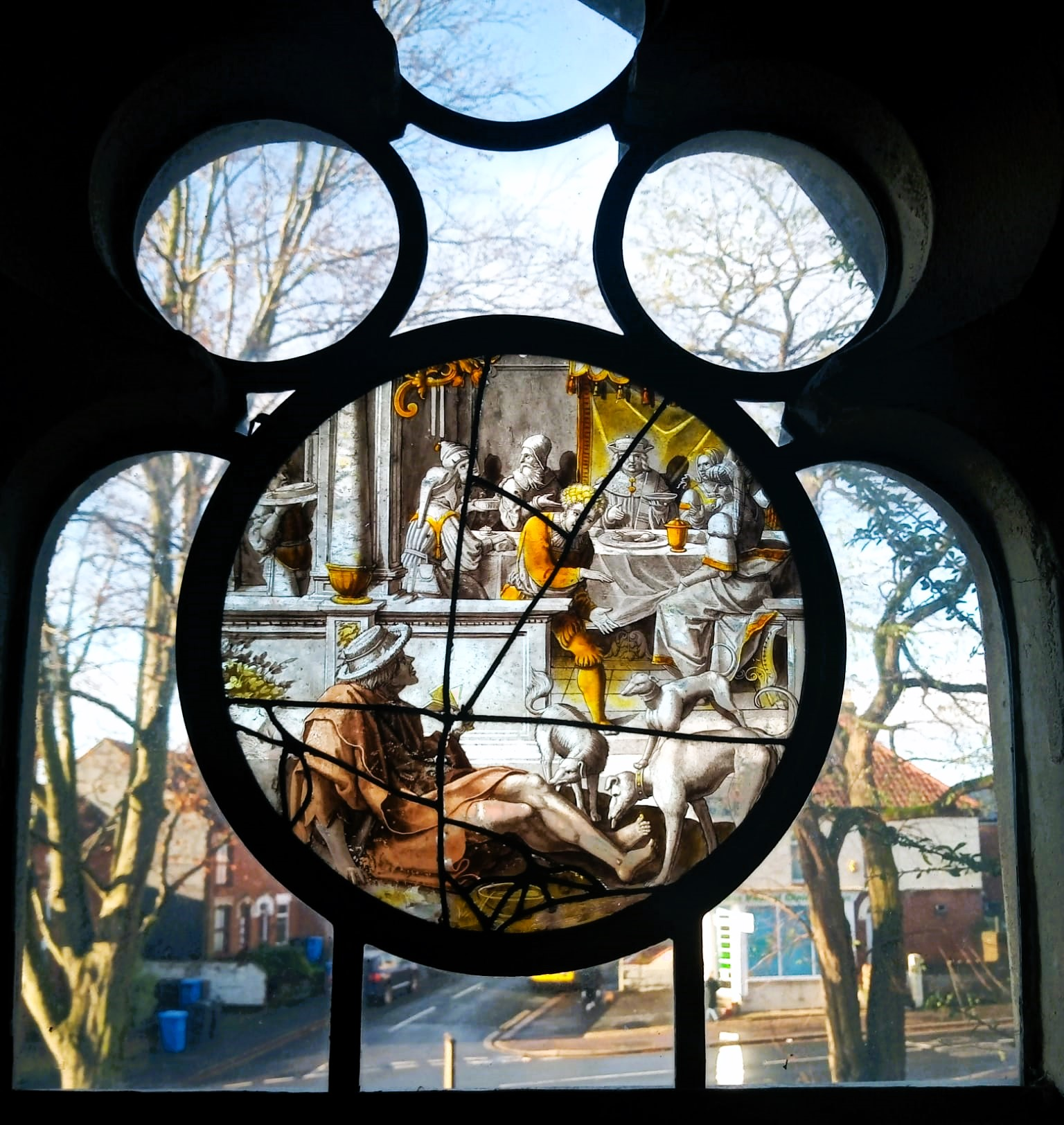
A roundel of the rich man and Lazarus, now at St Mary Magdalene

By the time of its closure, the church still had one of the three original bells, which was manufactured in 1625. The parish records for St James are kept at the Norfolk Record Office. Writing in the 18th century, Blomefield described a Lady chapel in the church, as well as a number of inscriptions on monumental brasses and tombstones. He copied memorials in the church, including brasses for Johanna Rysyng, Elizabeth Calthorp, and "Walteri Ftyer et Margarete Urori". A memorial in the chapel, read: "Pray for the Sowle of Nicholas Parker, on whose Sowle Jesus have Mercy Amen." In 1842, when the church was undergoing an extensive restoration, plans were approved for a gallery to be constructed at the west end.

=== Rood screen ===
The interior features once included a rood screen with painted panels that each featured a different saint. The screen is recorded as being "beautifully painted" in 1479.

According to a 1911 description of St. James's, the screen was dismantled in 1883. The panels were by 1911 "in private possession, with figures of Sts. Oswald, Sitha, Walstan, Blaise, Blida, Helen, Jean of Valois (dated 1515), Jude, Martin, Simon, Agnes, etc.". The panels were acquired from Norwich Market by the philanthropist Jeremiah Colman—reputedly for a shilling each. At some point, Colman arranged for his panels to be returned to the church. A new screen was made in 1946 for the surviving panels. A panel of Saint Oswald may have once existed, but is now lost.

In 1937, the art historian Audrey Baker identified the panels at St James the Less as one of eight other sets of panels from different East Anglian parish churches that all had a similar style to the screen at Ranworth. In later decades this so-called Ranworth group has been amended. Evidence suggests that the panels in the group are related by their date of construction, which has been determined using bequests that mention the screens, and the results of dendrochronology. They have similarities in the way they are constructed, as well as in their decorative schemes.

=== Font ===
The church's carved octagonal baptismal font, which depicts the four Evangelists, the Apostles, and eight female saints, and is decorated with leaves and branches on the underside, bears a close resemblance to the one that belonged to All Saints' Church, Norwich, but which is now in St Julian's Church, Norwich. The painted panels and the font were transferred to St Mary Magdalene in 1946.

=== Medieval cope ===
A priest's cope that was originally from St James is now in the keeping of the Norfolk Museums Service. The cope dates from 1480, according to David Cranage, a former Dean of Norwich. In 1954, it was repaired by experts at the Victoria and Albert Museum, London. The garment, which is made of silk and velvet, and is embroidered, was once considered to be the oldest such garment to be in use in England. The cope was displayed during The Art of Faith exhibition at the Norwich Castle Museum and Art Gallery in 2020.

The cope is adorned with double-headed eagles, flowers, and fleur-de-lys. The Assumption of Mary and two seraphs once formed the centrepiece, but these were removed following the Reformation—a dark area on the velvet reveals where these once were. The cope was later disassembled before being used as a table carpet. It was repaired at the end of the 19th century.

== Incumbents ==
The earliest known priest of St James was Sir Thomas Catlin (appointed in 1462). Other rectors, curates or vicars include Nicholas Gilman (1604–1626), John Barnham (1626–1662), William Herne (1735–1776), James Newton (1776–1811), Bell Cook (1826 –1843), Alfred Davies (1873–1896), Herbert Pitts (1929–1950), and Malcolm Menin (1962–1973).

20th–century vicars of St James
Name	Year of appointment	Comments
Thomas Stone	1896	Kelly's Directory (1904) states that "St Mary Magdalene's, a chapel of ease to St. James' Pockthorpe, was built 1902–1903 at a cost of about £3,500 on a site granted by the Ecclesiastical Commissioners, who also contributed £500 towards the cost of the building".
Charles Edward Osborne Griffith	1904	–
Herbert Benjamin John Armstrong	1916	–
Gerald Wilfred Fardell Howard	1922	–
Herbert Pitts	1929	Also curate-in-charge for St Martin at Palace, Norwich, from 1944. Pitts was already a graduate and a trained priest when he arrived in England from Australia.
John Harold Ferley	1950	Also curate-in-charge for St Martin at Palace, Norwich (1950–1952).
Sidney Long	1953	Also curate-in-charge for St Martin at Palace, Norwich (1953–1962).
Malcolm James Menin	1962	Also curate-in-charge for St Martin at Palace, Norwich (1962–1974); he became the vicar of St Mary Magdalene in 1972, after the church for the parish of St James, Pockthorpe was transferred there in that year. He was appointed Bishop of Knaresborough in 1986.

== Sources ==
- Atkin, Malcolm (1982). "St James' Church, Pockthorpe (Site 415N)". Excavations in Norwich 1971–1978. Pt.1. East Anglian Archaeology.
- Blomefield, Francis (1805). An Essay Towards A Topographical History of the County of Norfolk. Vol. 4. London.
- Blyth, G.K. (1842). The Norwich Guide. London: Josiah Fletcher. OCLC 27424477.
- Cooper, Trevor (2014). "For Public Benefit: Churches cared for by trusts" (PDF). Ecclesiology Today (49, 50). Ipswich Historic Churches Trust.
- Cox, John Charles (1911). Norfolk. County Churches. London: Allen. OCLC 697584637.
- Holmes, Frances (2015). The Old Courts and Yards of Norwich: a Story of People, Poverty and Pride. Norwich, UK: Norwich Heritage Projects. ISBN 978-09566-2-724-7.
- Ladick, Jason Robert (2021). Roots of Reform: Contextual Interpretation of Church Fittings in Norfolk During the English Reformation. Oxford, UK: Archaeopress Publishing Limited. ISBN 978-17896-9-767-4.
- Long, Sydney (1961). The History of the Church and Parish of St. James with Pockthorpe, Norwich. Ramsgate: The Church Publishers. OCLC 752600037.
- Pevsner, Nikolaus (1962). North-East Norfolk and Norwich. Penguin Books. p. 243.
- Pevsner, Nikolaus; Wilson, Bill (2002) [1962]. Norfolk. The Buildings of England. Vol. 1. Norwich and North-East. New Haven, Connecticut; London: Yale University Press. ISBN 978-0-300-09607-1.
- Wrapson, Lucy (2012). "East Anglian Rood-screens: the Practicalities of Production". In Binski, P.; New, E. (eds.). Patrons and Professionals in the Middle Ages: Proceedings of the 2010 Harlaxton Symposium (Conference paper). Donington. pp. 386–404. ISBN 978-19077-3-012-2.
- Wrapson, Lucy (2015). "Ranworth and its Associated Paintings: A Norwich Workshop". In Heslop, T.; Lunnon (eds.). Norwich: Medieval and Early Modern Art, Architecture and Archaeology. The British Archaeological Association Conference Transactions. Vol. 38. Leeds, UK: Maney Publishing. ISBN 978-19096-6-277-3.
