= Mary Caroline Moorman =

British historian and biographer

- Born: Mary Caroline Trevelyan; 19 February 1905
- Died: 21 January 1994 (aged 88)
- Education: Somerville College, Oxford
- Writing career
- Genres: History, Biography

Mary Caroline Moorman (19 February 1905 – 21 January 1994) was a British historian and biographer.

== Life ==
She was born Mary Caroline Trevelyan, the daughter of the renowned Cambridge historian G. M. Trevelyan. She studied at Somerville College, Oxford. In 1930, she published William III and the Defence of Holland, 1672-44. That same year, she married John Moorman, an Anglican cleric who rose to become the Bishop of Ripon.

She is best known today for her two-volume biography of the poet William Wordsworth. The first volume came out in 1957, followed by a second volume in 1966. The latter won the James Tait Black Memorial Prize for biography. She was also closely involved with the Wordsworth Trust, serving first as secretary and then as chair of the trust. She died in 1994.

== Works ==
- William the Third and the defence of Holland, 1672-4, London, New York Longmans, Green and Co., 1934. OCLC 5343246
- William Wordsworth : a biography, Clarendon Press, 1957-1965. OCLC 905665522
- George Macaulay Trevelyan : a memoir, London : H. Hamilton, 1980. ISBN 9780241103586, OCLC 905406826

== Sources ==
- Cannadine, David. "Trevelyan [née Ward], Janet Penrose". Oxford Dictionary of National Biography. doi:10.1093/odnb/9780198614128.013.369122. ISBN 978-0-19-861412-8.
