= Paul Hooper =

English Clergyman

Paul Denis Gregory Hooper (born 26 April 1952, in Winchester) was Archdeacon of Leeds from 2012 until 30 October 2016.

Hooper was educated at Eastbourne College, the University of Manchester and Wycliffe Hall, Oxford. He was ordained in 1982.
His posts up to 2012 were

- 1982-84: Curate St George, Leeds
- 1984-87: Diocese of Ripon Youth Officer
- 1987-95: Bishop's Domestic Chaplain, Diocese of Ripon
- 1995-2009: Vicar St Mark, Harrogate
- 2005-2009:Area Dean Harrogate
- 2009-12: Director Clergy Development, Diocese of Ripon and Leeds
