= Ralph Emmerson =

Ralph Emmerson (7 July 1913 – 31 December 2007) was Bishop of Knaresborough from 1972 to 1979. Born in Leeds, West Yorkshire on 7 July 1913 he was educated at Leeds Grammar School and King's College London. He worked initially in the Youth Employment Department of Leeds Educational Authority before studying for ordination at Westcott House, Cambridge. An urban priest and keen cricketer amongst many appointments he was Vicar of Headingley, in 1966 he was appointed Canon Missioner for the Diocese of Ripon. In 1972 he was promoted again to be Suffragan Bishop of Knaresborough a post he held to his retirement in 1979. For a further seven years he helped out as an honorary assistant bishop in the diocese he had served so well.

He died on 31 December 2007.

== Notes ==
Church of England titles
Preceded by John Howard Cruse	Bishop of Knaresborough; 1972–1979	Succeeded by John Dennis
