= Malcolm Menin =

English Anglican prelate (1932–2026)

The Rt Revd Malcolm Menin MA(Oxon)
- Bishop of Knaresborough
- Diocese: Diocese of Ripon
- In office: 1986–1997
- Predecessor: John Dennis
- Successor: Frank Weston
- Other post: Honorary assistant bishop in Norwich (2000–20??)

Orders
- Ordination: c. 1957 (deacon); c. 1958 (priest)
- Consecration: 1986

Personal details
- Born: 26 September 1932
- Died: 8 July 2026 (aged 93)
- Denomination: Anglican
- Parents: Revd. James & Doreen
- Spouse: Jennifer Cullen (m. 1958)
- Children: 1 son; 3 daughters
- Education: University College, Oxford

Malcolm James Menin (26 September 1932 – 8 July 2026) was an English Anglican prelate who was the Bishop of Knaresborough from 1986 to 1997.

== Biography ==
Menin was born on 26 September 1932. He was educated at the Dragon School and University College, Oxford before studying for ordination at Cuddesdon College, Oxford. After curacies in Portsmouth and Fareham he was appointed vicar of St James the Less, Pockthorpe in 1962, an area which he was to be associated with for much of the rest of his life. He was also appointed Rural Dean of Norwich in 1981. In 1982 he was also appointed an honorary canon of Norwich Cathedral and then appointment as the suffragan Bishop of Knaresborough in 1986. On retirement, he returned to Norwich.

Menin died on 8 July 2026, aged 93.

Church of England titles
Preceded by John Dennis	Bishop of Knaresborough; 1986–1997	Succeeded by Frank Weston
