= St Margaret of Antioch Church, Headingley =

Church in Leeds, England

Coordinates: 53.8099°N 1.5742°W

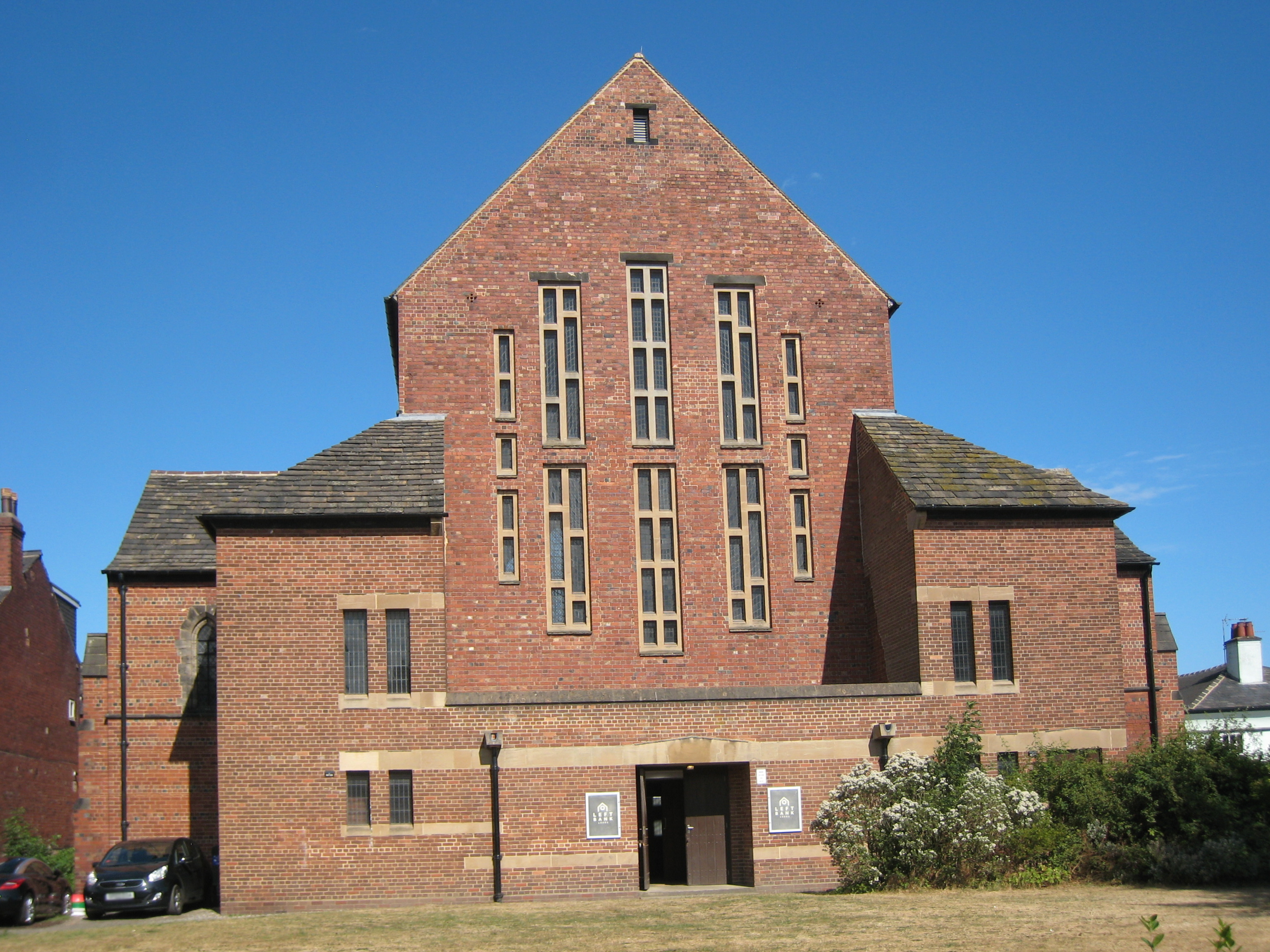
Left Bank Leeds, Cardigan Road in 2012, formerly St Margaret of Antioch church

The former St Margaret of Antioch's Church building is situated on Cardigan Road, Headingley, West Yorkshire, England, near Burley Park railway station. It is an example of Late Gothic Revival church architecture, and it was built in the first few years of the twentieth century, being consecrated in 1909. It was built in the Parish of Burley to serve the population of the newly built red-brick terrace houses in the area, part of the late Victorian expansion of Leeds. Whilst a functioning Anglican Church, it had an Anglo-Catholic flavour. It is a Grade II* listed building, and was designed by Temple Moore.

The building was rescued from dereliction by a group of local Christians and it is now the multidisciplinary arts venue Left Bank Leeds. Its mission is to preserve the amazing venue in order to inspire and empower the community via a sustainable programme of arts and events that promotes creativity, connection and wellbeing.

== History ==
=== 1897–1910 fund raising and Temple Moore ===
The first church on the site was an iron building, temporarily erected to serve the newly built houses in the surrounding area. The first vicar was Rev A.H Kelk who took possession of the parsonage in 1897.

The iron church building was dedicated for use in March 1898 by Archdeacon Kilner, and for years served as the church building, Sunday school room and social venue. It was very hot in the summer, and right from the start, raising funds for a permanent church building were discussed.

The first edition of the monthly parish magazine was in January 1899, for which subscriptions were sought, and around 800 were taken up. The parish decided it needed a separate Sunday school building as a priority, which was finally finished at Easter 1900, just in time for the Easter Parochial Tea.

The following years saw greater efforts at fund-raising for the permanent building, which included bazaars held in Leeds Town Hall, door to door canvassing and requests to neighbouring businesses and parishes, as well as the diocese itself.

The money was raised, and architect Temple Moore was commissioned from 1901. The foundation stone was laid on 26 October 1907, the first phase of the building (with an unfinished west end) was completed in 1908, and consecrated in the following year. The first wedding in the newly consecrated church was on Easter Monday, 1909.

It is widely regarded as a particularly fine example of the Late Gothic Revival style and of Temple Moore's work. This later led to the building being accorded Grade II* listed building status. Temple Moore had also designed a vicarage and a First World War memorial, neither of which were built.

=== 1910 – mid-1990s ===
The front (west) end was never completed to Moore's plans – it was originally designed to have a huge tower and would have had something simple and easily removable for whenever works on that were to start.

In 1911 St Margaret's became a separate parish.

Parish life carried on in the building, with all the usual events and groups that are associated with Anglican parishes – Sunday services, baptisms, marriages and deaths, men's society, confirmation classes, musical society, bazaars, Mothers Union, Whitsun parades, and groups for children and teachers, as well as the annual parochial excursion which usually took place around St Margaret of Antioch's feast day, 20 July.

The new vicar, Rev B. Combe, wrote in 1920 in the parish magazine:

"I am learning every week to understand better your pride in St Margaret’s Church. For every week shews me new beauties in the building, and I am now almost used to being introduced to fellow clergy with such additional remarks as: "S Margaret’s – it’s the finest Church in Leeds". Its stern grandeur in Lent, followed by its glory on Easter Day, was almost over-powering".

In 1959 a Jubilee Building Fund was launched, with the intention of completing the church building. The original Temple Moore plans were deemed too ornate and expensive, and so the architect George Pace from York, who was a great admirer of Moore's work, designed the current west end which was completed in 1963. Sir John Betjeman knew and admired the building, especially the interior.

With changes in demographics in the local area, and a more transient population, a deepening relationship and possible amalgamation with All Hallows Parish was mooted, but it did not come to pass. Neither did a suggested amalgamation with St Michael's, Headingley.

During the 1940s to the 1960s, the church played host to the Orthodox Liturgy and Communion in Slovak, the Polish Orthodox Church and the Russian Orthodox Church in Exile, as well renting a local house for Belgian refugees during the First World War. Throughout these years, until the 1970s, the tradition of the church and its services was maintained as Anglo-Catholic.

The congregation declined in number, and by the mid nineties were down to only a few.

=== Mid-nineties – present ===
The church was declared redundant by the Church Commissioners in March 1995 and the building closed for worship, within the congregation being combined with the neighbouring All Hallows parish and the church there being renamed St Margaret's and All Hallows. In 2001 the St Margaret's building was bought by a local congregation of Christians, who wanted to see the building used again and not fall into further ruin. It was used occasionally for special events and services but because of damage to the roof and an infestation of pigeons, the building became a health hazard and unfit for use. English Heritage funded essential building repairs as it was on the listed Buildings at Risk Register.

A steering group was formed to look at ways of bringing the building back into use and slowly a future vision came into focus. The building is a multidisciplinary arts venue called Left Bank Leeds. Its mission is to preserve the amazing venue in order to inspire and empower the community via a sustainable programme of arts and events that promotes creativity, connection and wellbeing. Left Bank Leeds has a programme of arts and events that include exhibitions, gigs, festivals, cinema, talks, afternoon teas and is open to the public as a co-working space. It was cited by The Guardian in The alt city guide to Leeds for its arts programme. The building is open to the public and is also available to hire for public events and private functions.

== Architectural and interior features still existing ==
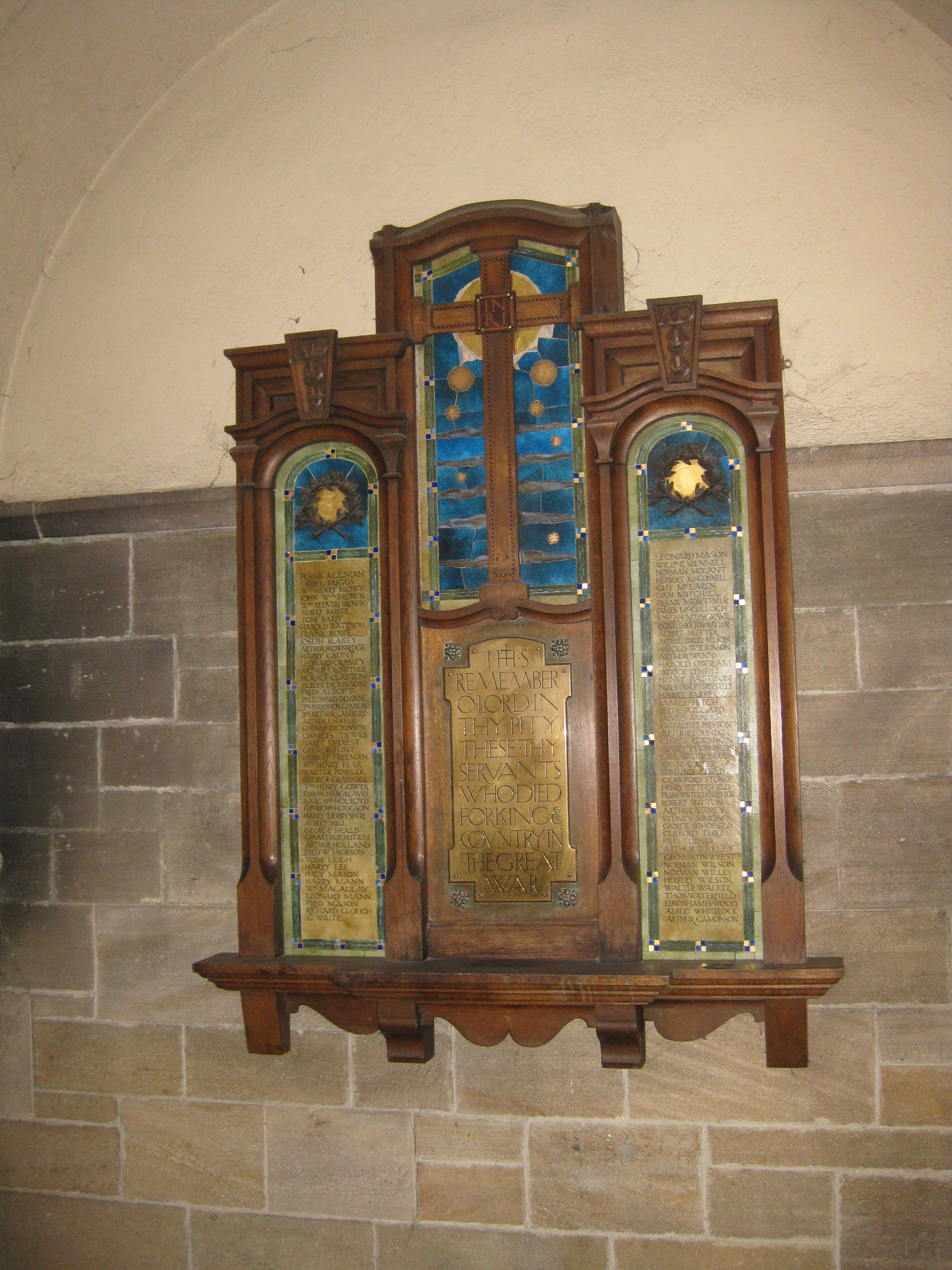
Art Nouveau War Memorial

- WWI memorial, dedicated and unveiled 12 February 1923, (intact, now moved to SW corner)
- Stained glass window (east end)
- Plaques
- Choir stalls designed and installed by Leslie Moore (intact)
- High altar, dedicated in its current form 1950

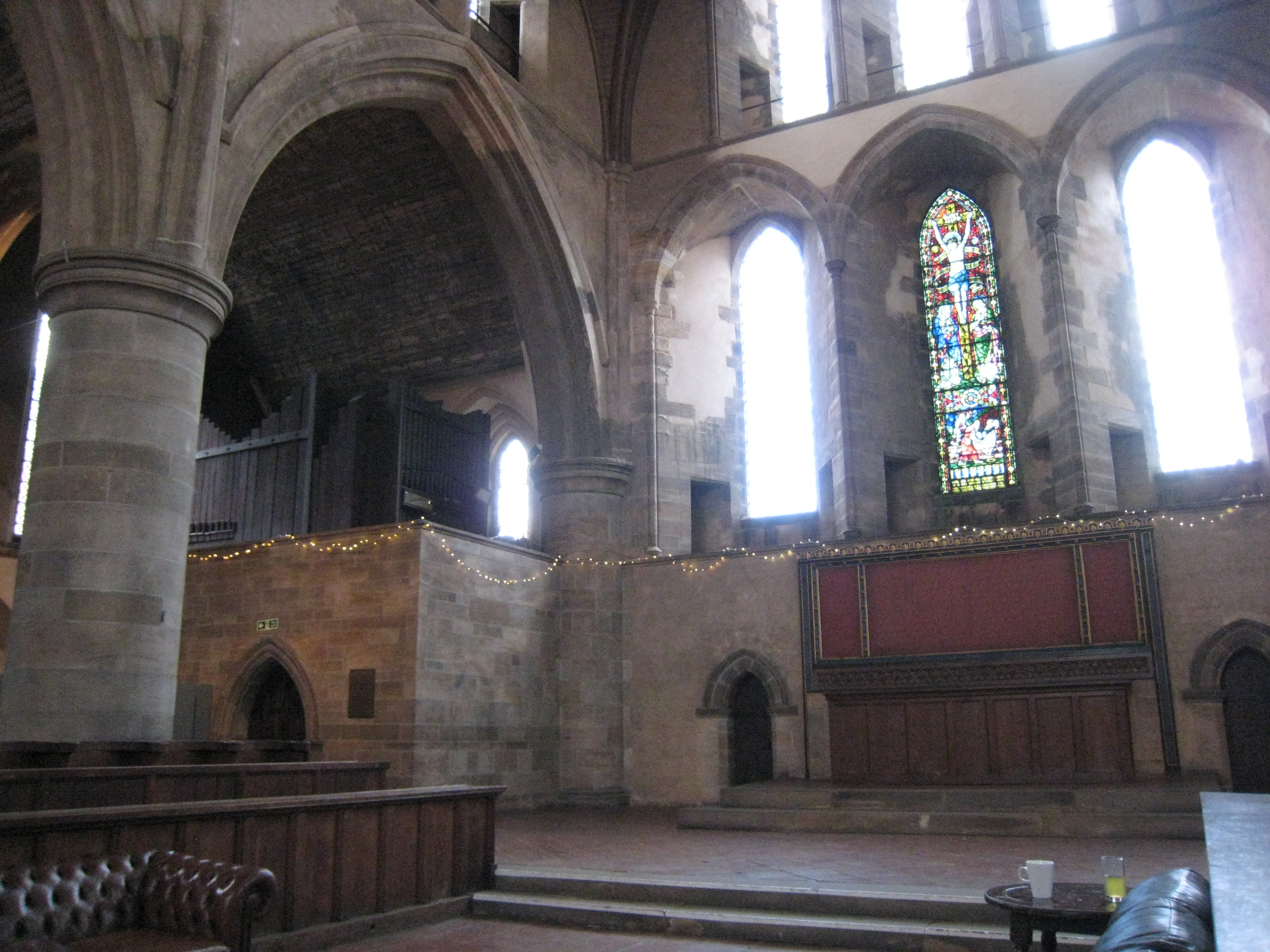
Altar, stained glass and choir stalls

== Incumbents ==
Vicars:

- 1897 – May 1919 the Revd Arthur Hastings Kelk (previously Anglican Chaplain in Beirout, subsequently the Parish of Goldsborough)
- 1919 – June 1925 Revd Robert Combe (previously British Columbia, Canada, subsequently Cape Town, South Africa)
- November 1925 – June 1944 Revd Frank Callister (previously St Edmund's, Leeds, subsequently Vicar of Bardsey)
- September 1944 – 1948 Revd Herbert William Figgess (previously St Wilfrid's Harrogate subsequently Fiji)
- November 1948 – September 1953 Fr Philip John Lyndon (previously chaplain to the Royal Australian Air Force, subsequently to St Aidan's, Harehills)
- January 1954 – March 1964 Fr Philip Reginald Shepherd (previously Vicar of Bramham, subsequently Shepton Beauchamp, Somerset)
- October 1964 – July 1973 Fr Kenneth Whitfield (previously Area Secretary for the Universities Mission to Central Africa, subsequently Chaplain to the Community of St Peter, Horbury)
- January 1974 – November 1981 Fr David Curtis Broome (previously from St Margaret's, Leigh on Sea)
- Revd Stanley Baxter

Curates:

- September 1899 – 1903 Revd HS Footman
- 1904–1906 DJB Lewis
- 1907–1909 AJ Alexander
- 1912–1916 FG Badrick
- 1920–1925 Revd GRJ Round
- 1925–1926 (Priest in charge) Revd Alex W Cook
- 1930–1931 Revd WC Middleton
- 1931–1933 (approx) Sister Alder
- 1933–1935 (approx) Deaconess Gwendolene Bowman
- 1951–1954 Deacon Revd John Denys Taylor
- 1957–1960 Fr John P Beaumont
- 1960–1962 Fr Raymond Reynolds
- 1966–1967 Fr Malcolm Alflatt

== See also ==
- List of new churches by Temple Moore
- List of works by George Pace
