= Frank Weston (bishop of Knaresborough) =

Bishop of Knaresborough (1935–2003)

The Right Reverend Frank Weston
- Bishop of Knaresborough
- Church: Church of England
- Diocese: Diocese of Ripon and Leeds
- In office: 1997 to 2003
- Predecessor: Malcolm Menin
- Successor: James Bell
- Previous post: Archdeacon of Oxford (1982–1997)

Orders
- Ordination: 1961 (deacon); 1962 (priest)
- Consecration: 1997

Personal details
- Born: Frank Valentine Weston; 16 September 1935
- Died: 29 April 2003 (aged 67)
- Denomination: Anglicanism

Frank Valentine Weston (16 September 1935 – 29 April 2003) was suffragan Bishop of Knaresborough in the then Diocese of Ripon and Leeds from December 1997 until his death in April 2003.

== Biography ==
Weston was born into a clerical family; his uncle was Frank Weston (Bishop of Zanzibar). He was educated at Christ's Hospital and The Queen's College, Oxford (BA 1960, MA 1964). He then studied for ordination at Lichfield Theological College.

Weston was ordained in the Church of England as a deacon in 1961 and as a priest in 1962. He was a curate in Atherton (1961–65). Then began an association of more than 20 years with the College of the Ascension at Selly Oak, initially as chaplain (1965–69) and then as principal (1969–76). From 1973 until 1976 he was also Vice-President of Selly Oak Colleges and from 1976 until 1982 Principal and Pantonian Professor at Edinburgh Theological College. In 1982 he was appointed Archdeacon of Oxford and a residentiary canon of Christ Church, Oxford. He held the post until his elevation to the episcopate in 1997 and continued his association with Christ Church with an appointment as "emeritus student", a position roughly equivalent to an emeritus fellowship.

Weston was appointed Bishop of Knaresborough, the suffragan bishop for the then Diocese of Ripon and Leeds, serving from December 1997 until his death in 2003. He was welcomed into the diocese during a service at Ripon Cathedral on 25 January 1998. He had a stroke and subsequently died on 29 April 2003 in St James's Hospital, Leeds.

Church of England titles
Preceded by Carlyle Witton-Davies	Archdeacon of Oxford; 1982–1997	Succeeded by John Morrison
Preceded by Malcolm Menin	Bishop of Knaresborough; 1997–2003	Succeeded by James Bell
