= F. W. Moorman =

English poet and playwright

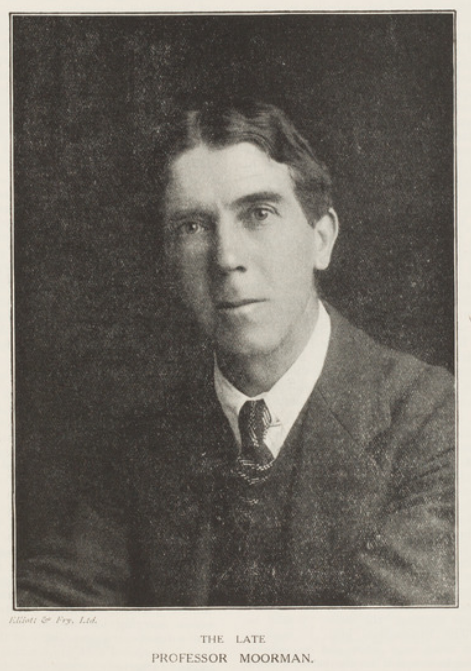
Frederic William Moorman

Frederic William Moorman (1872–1919) was a poet and playwright, and Professor of English Language at the University of Leeds from 1912 to 1918.

== Biography ==
Moorman grew up in Devon. He married Frances Beatrice Humpidge (1867–1956) and was the father of John Moorman, who would become Bishop of Ripon.

== Career ==
=== Academic and writing ===
Following university study in Strasbourg, Moorman joined the staff of the Yorkshire College, Leeds, in 1898; the Yorkshire College subsequently became the University of Leeds in 1904. When a new Chair was instituted in 1912, Moorman was appointed the university's first Professor of English Language.

Moorman edited the 1912 edition of Shakespeare's The Winter's Tale for the Arden Shakespeare project, published by Methuen, and in 1915 edited The Poetical Works of Robert Herrick for Oxford University Press. Moorman was associated with the Workers' Educational Association and compiled several books of traditional Yorkshire stories and poems, some in the Yorkshire dialect, alongside scholarly works such as The Place-Names of the West Riding of Yorkshire, The Publications of the Thoresby Society, and 18 (Leeds: The Thoresby Society, 1910).

In his 1914 essay for the English Association, ‘English Place Names and the Teutonic Sagas’, Moorman suggested his research indicated that Yorkshire was not settled by Angles or Saxons after the end of rule Roman in AD 383, but by a different Germanic tribe, the Geats. As a consequence, he claimed, it is possible the first work of English literature, Beowulf, believed to have been composed by Geats, was written in Yorkshire. This interest in Yorkshire's cultural and linguistic history was to be of particular interest to one of Moorman's students at Leeds University, the poet, novelist and art critic Herbert Read. Read described Moorman as 'the most inspiring teacher in the university.' As a result of his enthusiasm for Moorman, Read also wrote two Yorkshire dialect plays which he gave as a gift to Moorman some time shortly before the First World War.

=== BBC and folk music ===
Moorman's own plays were performed several times on BBC Radio, including The Ewe Lamb, broadcast on the BBC Home Service (Midlands and North) on 31 December 1931, and Throp's Wife, on the BBC Home Service (North) on 3 October 1938. In this listing for this in the BBC's listings magazine, Radio Times, it was stated:

That brilliant and indefatigable student of the words and idioms of Yorkshire folk speech, the late F. W. Moorman, who was Professor of English Language in Leeds University, once told how, intrigued by the' saying 'As thrang as Throp's wife ' and long baffled in his search for its origin, he journeyed through the West Riding in search of someone who could explain the phrase. The explanation came from an old Yorkshireman met in a West Riding inn at Cowling Hill.

Moorman's poem "The Dalesman's Litany" also became a standard in folk music circles, appearing on Tim Hart and Maddy Prior's album, Folk Songs of Old England Vol. 1 in 1968, again on Cliff Hasla's 1976 album Here's A Health to the Man and the Maid, and again in 2011 in Moore Moss Rutter's eponymous album, Moore Moss Rutter.

First stanza from Moorman's 'The Dalesman's Litany':

From Hull, Halifax, and Hell, good Lord deliver us (a Yorkshire Proverb.)

It's hard when fowks can't find their wark
Wheer they've bin bred an' born;
When I were young I awlus thowt
I'd bide 'mong t' roots an' corn.
But I've bin forced to work i' towns,
So here's my litany
Frae Hull, an' Halifax, an' Hell,
Gooid Lord, deliver me!

== Death ==
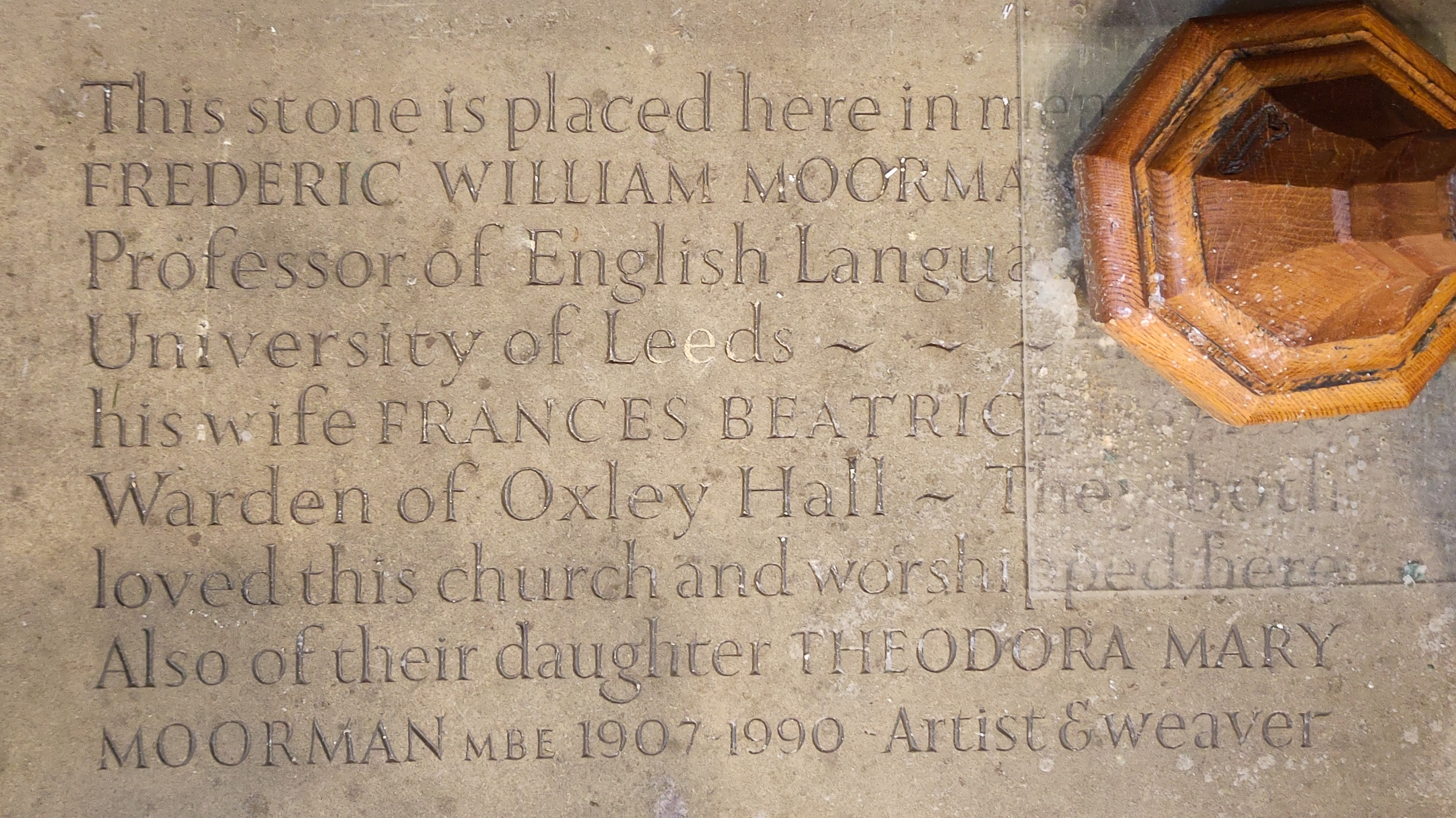
Memorial to F. W. Moorman and his family in Adel Church, Leeds

Moorman drowned in the River Skirfare, "while bathing with his children at Hawkswick, Upper Wharfedale" on September 8, 1919. The Leeds student newspaper The Gryphon published poems in his memory by Dorothy Una Ratcliffe and one "W.G." He was succeeded at Leeds in 1920 by J. R. R. Tolkien.
