= Bishop Young Church of England Academy =

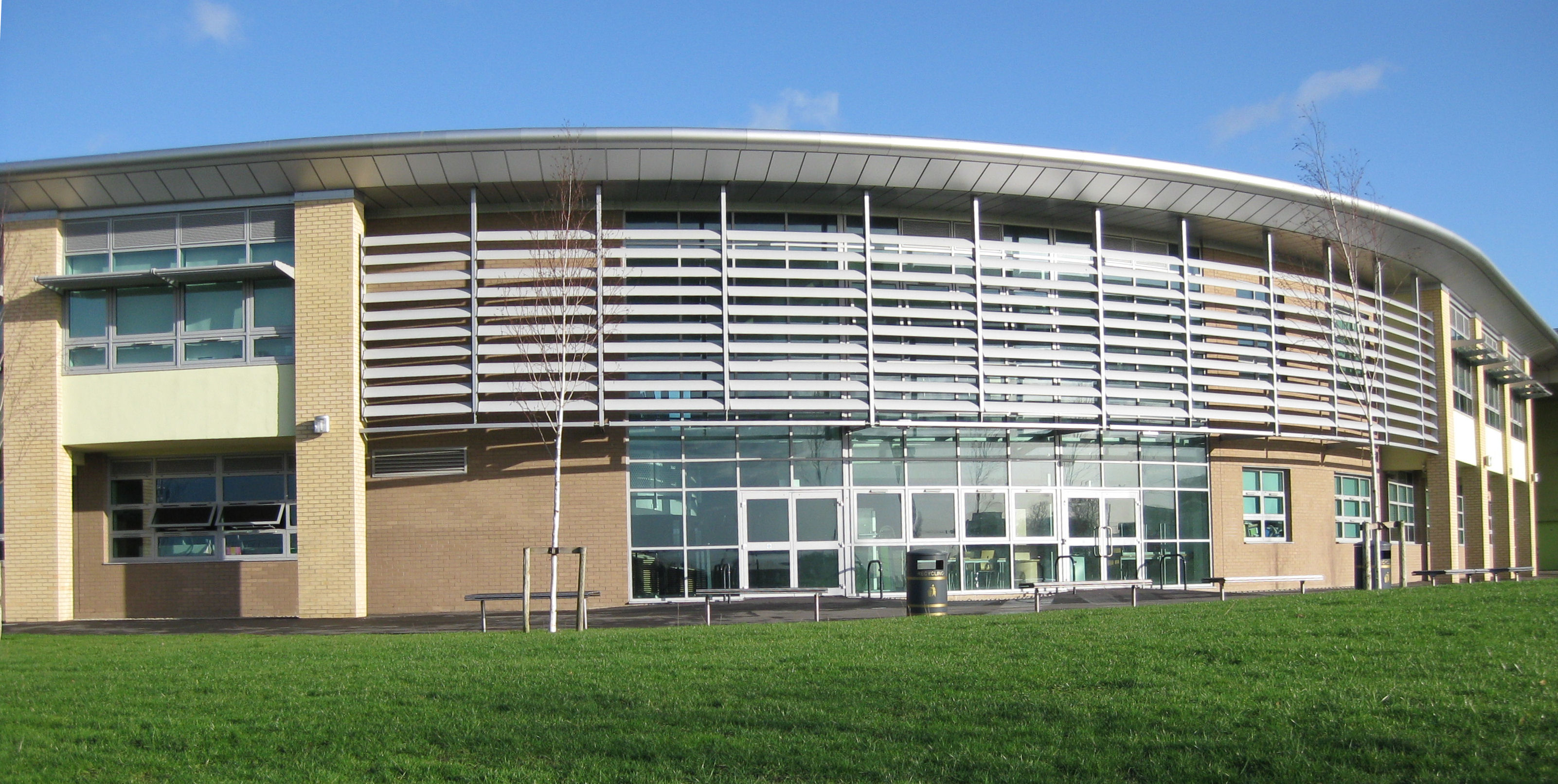

Location
- Bishops Way; Seacroft; Leeds, West Yorkshire, LS14 6NU; England; 53.82018°N 1.47655°W

Information
- Type: Academy
- Motto: In partnership to Educate, Nurture & Empower
- Religious affiliation: Church of England
- Established: 1 May 2017 (DYCA: June 2006)
- Closed: (DYCA: 2017)
- Local authority: City of Leeds
- Trust: Abbey Multi Academy Trust
- Department for Education URN: 144809 Tables
- Ofsted: Reports
- Principal: Paul Cooper
- Staff: 180
- Gender: Mixed-sex education
- Age: 11 to 16
- Enrolment: 683
- Capacity: 900
- Houses: 6
- Colours: blue, purple, grey and white
- Website: www.bishopyoungacademy.co.uk

Bishop Young Church of England Academy (formerly known as David Young Community Academy) is a state-funded academy sponsored by the Church of England in Seacroft, Leeds, West Yorkshire, England.

The school was named after David Young (1931–2008), a former Bishop of Ripon. The school was established on 18 September 2006 with pupils from Agnes Stewart Church of England High School and Braim Wood for Boys High School. These schools had both been in difficulties at the time of their closures.

In June 2009 it was announced by School Secretary Ed Balls that £3.3 million would be spent on the school to create a purpose-built base for army and air cadets.

Bishop Young Academy is part of the Abbey Multi Academy Trust. As of 2023, the trust includes eight primary and secondary academies in the Diocese of Leeds.

== Academic performance ==
The school's population in January 2008 was 920, with a sixth form of 65. At the same time the school had one of the worst attendance records in the country, and was 25th from the bottom for GCSE results. In 2009, a report to the Chief Executive of Education Leeds said that schools like "John Smeaton Community College and the David Young Community Academy have transformed standards and outcomes in areas of Leeds where in the past poor standards and poor outcomes were simply accepted as the norm".

In the final full Ofsted inspection of David Young Community Academy inspectors rated it inadequate in all four assessment criteria. Further to this they found that 'Leaders of the school and the academy trust have failed to fulfil legislative requirements relating to safeguarding and to health and safety'.

In a follow-up inspection by Ofsted in May 2016 the lead inspector 'strongly recommend[ed] that the academy does not seek to appoint newly qualified teachers', reflecting the poor nature of the school's academic performance.

In 2017 the school changed its name as part of a "Fresh Start". The school had previously been part of the LEAF Academy Trust. It became part of the Abbey Multi Academy Trust in May 2017.

The school's Progress 8 benchmark at GCSE in 2022 was −0.32, compared to 0.12 in Leeds as a whole and −0.03 nationally. 8% of children at the school were entered for the English Baccalaureate, compared to 41% in Leeds as a whole and 39% nationally. 40% of children at the school achieved grade 5 or above in English and maths GCSEs, compared to 51% in Leeds as a whole and 50% nationally. The school's Attainment 8 score in 2022 was 43, compared to 48 in Leeds and 49 nationally.

Following the school's change of name and governance, it was inspected by Ofsted in 2021, with the judgement of Requires Improvement. As of 2023, this is the school's most recent inspection.
