= Norwich Puppet Theatre =

UK puppetry company

Coordinates: 52°38′9.5″N 1°18′1″E

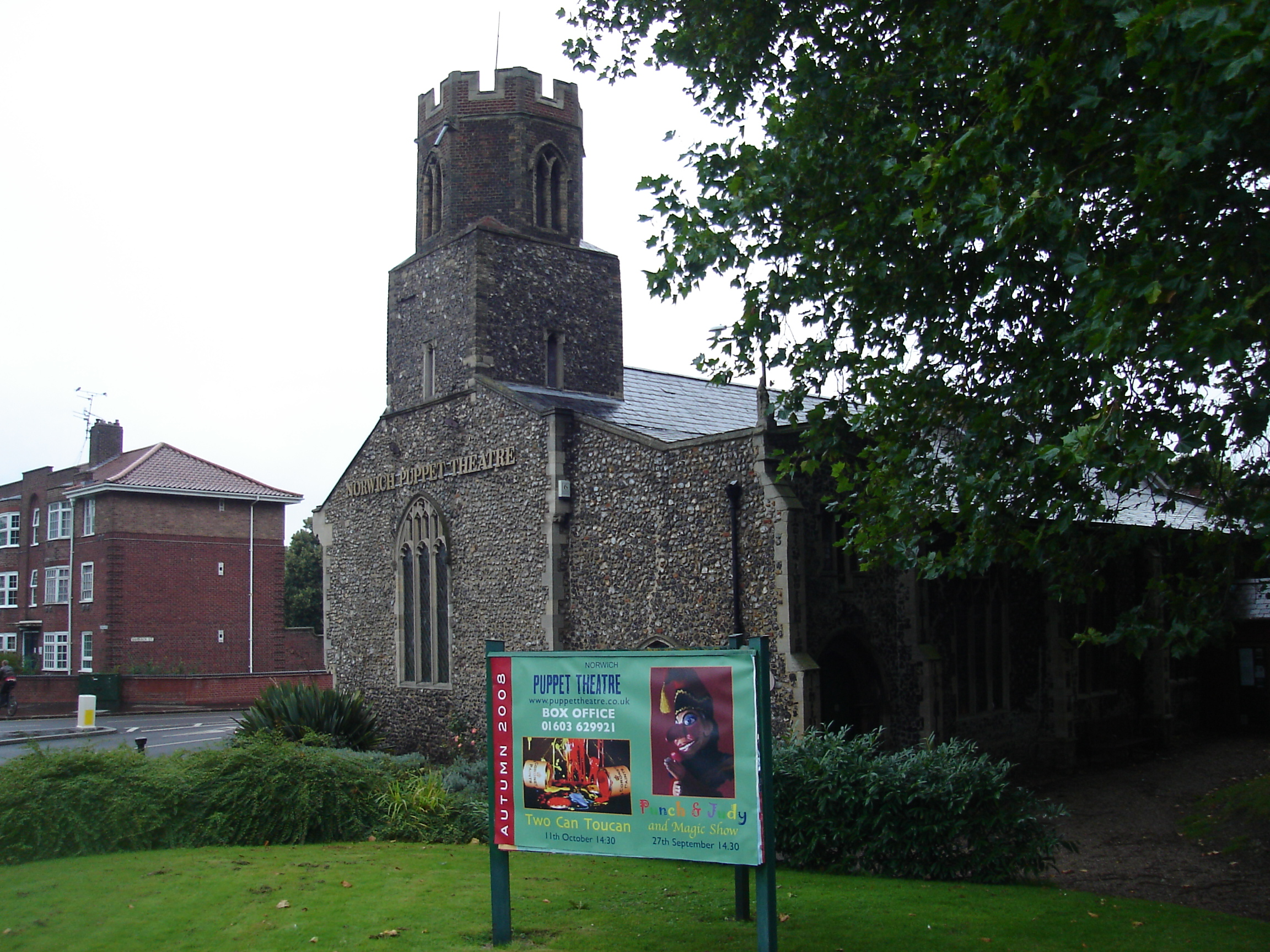
Norwich Puppet Theatre

The Norwich Puppet Theatre is a nationally unique venue dedicated to puppetry. The theatre occupies the medieval church of St James the Less, Pockthorpe, a Grade I listed building, in Norwich, Norfolk, UK.

It currently houses a 150-seat raked auditorium, a 50-seat studio, workshops, an exhibition gallery, a shop and a licensed bar. It is the only theatre in the eastern region of the UK which has a year-round programme of family-centred entertainment. It plays host to a variety of touring companies from the UK and overseas, and provides regular educational workshops for children and adults, as well as training opportunities for theatre practitioners.

The theatre continues to be supported by Norfolk County Council and Norwich City Council along with contributions from foundations including: Garfield Weston Foundation, Geoffrey Watling, Norwich Town Close Estate and the John Jarrold Trust.

== History ==
The Norwich Puppet Theatre was founded in 1979 by Joan and Ray Da Silva (aka Ray Palma) as a permanent base for their touring company and was first opened as a public venue on 1 December 1980. They had run a puppet company touring overseas and had previously been based in Cambridgeshire. Until mid 2026 broadcaster and author Zeb Soanes, and artist and illustrator James Mayhew, were patrons of the theatre.

== 30th anniversary ==
In 2010 the theatre celebrated its 30th anniversary with a range of events. An auction of celebrity decorated puppets took place on 30 November, including contributions from Heston Blumenthal, Michael Sheen, Sophie Ellis-Bextor, Gary Lineker, Quentin Blake, Cath Kidston, Gok Wan, Terry Gilliam, Tony Robinson, Prunella Scales, Bernard Cribbins, Ian McKellen, Richard Briers and Simon Callow.

An evening celebration and cabaret night were held on 4 December, (https://vimeo.com/29906760) showcasing a selection of artists and performers from the theatre's 30-year history.

== Company ==
The theatre is also the base for the Norwich Puppet Theatre Company, which creates and presents its own productions, touring to schools and venues throughout the UK as well as international venues and festivals. Following a period of hiatus due to the loss of its artistic director in 2008, the company returned in 2010 with a new production in collaboration with the Indefinite Articles theatre company, entitled The Chalk Giants.

The company's work is informed by concepts and techniques from a range of cultures, and encourages the exchange of ideas by hosting companies and individuals of differing nationalities and by presenting its own work abroad. This has included performances in Canada, Finland, Spain, Mexico, and Slovenia.

== Artistic policy ==
The theatre aims to develop a public taste for the artform of puppet theatre rather than follow a fashion or present shows purely for commercial reasons, maintaining a dialogue with, and breaking down barriers between, different artforms particularly in relation to the combination of puppet theatre and live music. The theatre works with a wide range of techniques including rod, glove, shadow, objects, toys and masks, developing and exploring each technique individually and in combination with one another.

== Artistic directors ==
- Ray Da Silva 1979-1986
- Barry Smith 1986-1991
- Luis Z.Boy 1991-2008
- Joy Haynes 2011-2016
- Colette Garrigan 2021
- Peter Beck 2022-2026

== Past Productions ==
- Pied Piper
- Thumbelina
- Red Riding Hood In collaboration with Peter O'Rourke.
- The Chalk Giants In collaboration with indefiniteArticles theatre company.
- The Tinderbox
- Princess and the Pea
- The Frog & The Princess In collaboration with Rene Baker.
- The Steadfast Tin Soldier
- Alice in Wonderland
- Snowhite
- Legend of Thunderbird
- Treasure Island
- James and the Giant Peach
- Pinocchio
- Stel and Wes Fight the Flood
