= Richard Malden =

Anglican churchman and writer (1879–1951)

Richard Henry Malden, BD, (19 October 1879 – August 1951), Dean of Wells, was an Anglican churchman, editor, classical and Biblical scholar, and a writer of ghost stories.

== Career ==
Educated at Eton College and King's College, Cambridge, Malden was ordained deacon in 1904 and priest in 1905 by Edmund Knox, the Bishop of Manchester. He subsequently served as Assistant Curate at St Peter's, Swinton, Salford, 1904–07; Lecturer at Selwyn College, Cambridge, 1907–10; Principal of Leeds Clergy School, and Lecturer of Leeds Parish Church, 1910–19. During the First World War he served as Acting Chaplain of HMS Valiant, January 1916–December 1917 and an Acting Chaplain, R N, 1916–18. His next appointment was as Vicar of St Michael and All Angels Church, Headingley, Leeds, 1918–33, later becoming Honorary Canon of Ripon, 1926–33, and Dean of Wells, 1933–50.

He was also Examining Chaplain to the Bishop of Norwich from 1910; Proctor in Convocation, 1924–33; Chaplain to the King, 1926–1933 and President of the Somerset Archaeological Society, 1943–44.

He served additionally as general editor of Crockford's Clerical Directory between 1920 and 1944. His main task in this respect was to write many of the anonymous prefaces for which the directory was becoming celebrated, offering an overview of recent events in the church. His other ecclesiastical commitments would have allowed little time for participating in the more routine aspects of producing the directory. Between 1942 and 1947, he also edited his local diocesan magazine, the Bath & Wells Diocesan Gazette.

His book of stories Nine Ghosts (1942) was compiled over many years and issued as a tribute to his long friendship with the writer M R James, who had been one of the most celebrated authors in this particular genre.

== Personal details ==
Malden was the son of Charles Edward Malden, Recorder of Thetford, and Sarah Fanny Malden, daughter of Sir Richard Mayne. He was married at Holy Trinity Church Marylebone, on 24 January 1918 to Etheldred Theodora Macnaughten, daughter of Canon H A Macnaughten of Tankersley, Yorkshire.

His politics were reportedly "High Tory with a hint of Erastianism". In his latter years he became a familiar figure in Wells and elsewhere, typically wearing a frock coat and top hat.

== Bibliography ==
His main publications included:

- Foreign Missions, 1910
- The Temptation of the Son of Man, 1913
- Watchman, What of the Night?, 1918
- The Old Testament 1919
- Problems of the New Testament To-day, 1923
- The Church of Headingley in Four Centuries, 1923
- Religion and the New Testament 1928
- This Church and Realm, 1931
- The Roman Catholic Church and the Church of England, 1933
- The Story of Wells Cathedral, 1934
- The Inspiration of the Bible, 1935
- The Apocrypha, 1936
- The Promise of the Father, 1937
- The Authority of the New Testament, 1937
- Christian Belief, 1942
- Nine Ghosts, 1942
- The Growth of a Cathedral Church, 1944
- Abbeys, their Rise and Fall, 1944
- The Hangings in the Quire of Wells Cathedral, 1948
- The English Church and Nation (London: SPCK, 1952)
