= David Young (bishop) =

The Right Reverend David Young
- Bishop of Ripon
- Diocese: Diocese of Ripon
- In office: 1977–1999
- Predecessor: Hetley Price
- Successor: John Packer as Bishop of Ripon & Leeds
- Other posts: Archdeacon of Huntingdon; 1975–1977

Orders
- Ordination: 1959 (deacon); 1960 (priest)
- Consecration: 21 September 1977

Personal details
- Born: 2 September 1931 Poona, Bombay Presidency, British India
- Died: 10 August 2008 (aged 76)
- Denomination: Anglican
- Spouse: Rachel Lewis m. 1962; dec. 1966; Jane Havill m. 1967
- Children: 4 sons; 1 daughter
- Profession: Academic in divinity
- Education: Balliol College, Oxford

David Nigel de Lorentz Young CBE (2 September 1931 – 10 August 2008) was a British Anglican priest, who served as the last Bishop of Ripon before the diocese became known as the Diocese of Ripon and Leeds. At his appointment at the age of 46 he was the youngest diocesan bishop of the Church of England.

He was a supporter of women priests, but opposed to active homosexual priests and same-sex marriages. He had special knowledge of Eastern religions (especially Buddhism) and languages, which he used in his interfaith work, and was particularly concerned with education.

== Early life, education and military career ==
Born in Poona, then in the Bombay Presidency of British India, the son of an Indian Army brigadier, David Young returned to the UK for his education at Wellington College, Berkshire. He then did National Service in the Royal Engineers, being commissioned as a second lieutenant on 21 October 1950, He completed his active duty on 15 October 1951 when he transferred to the Supplementary Reserve of Officers, and went up to Balliol College, Oxford, where he studied mathematics, gaining a first class degree. He was promoted acting lieutenant on 6 July 1952, and this was made substantive on 2 September 1954, and his National Service ended on 23 September 1955.

== Ecclesiastical and academic career ==
Young worked in industry as a research mathematician with Plessey before deciding to take holy orders via study at Wycliffe Hall, Oxford. He worked as a curate in Liverpool and London, then went to the School of Oriental and African Studies to study Sanskrit and Pali before going to Sri Lanka with the Church Missionary Society. He became interested in Buddhism, becoming director of Buddhist Studies at Lanka Theological College in Kandy. Returning to England in 1967 following the death of his first wife, he became lecturer in Buddhist Studies at Manchester University.

In 1970 he was appointed vicar of Burwell, Cambridgeshire. He lectured part-time in the Faculty of Divinity of Cambridge University. He briefly rejoined the army, holding a commission as a Chaplain to the Forces, 4th Class in the Territorial Army section of the Royal Army Chaplains' Department between 21 November 1972 and 5 September 1975. In 1975, he was appointed Archdeacon of Huntingdon, and vicar of Great Gidding, then in 1977, briefly rector of Hemingford Abbots and an honorary canon before his nomination as Bishop of Ripon. He retired in 1999, having been diagnosed with bone marrow cancer.

== Family ==
In 1962, he married his first wife Rachel Lewis (who died in a car crash in 1966), with whom he had a son and a daughter. In 1967, he married his second wife, Jane Havill, who survived him, and by whom he had three further sons.

== Church positions ==
- Chair of the Church of England's Board of Education

== Honours ==
- Young was appointed Commander of the Order of the British Empire (CBE) in the 2000 New Year Honours, "For services to the Church of England and to Education."
- The David Young Community Academy in the Seacroft area of Leeds was named after him on 18 October 2006. It is a 'faith school', built at a cost of £23m.

== Associations ==
Young was associated with the United Religions Initiative in the United States' Episcopal Church.
