= John Packer =

British Anglican bishop (born 1946)

The Right Reverend John Packer
- Bishop of Ripon and Leeds
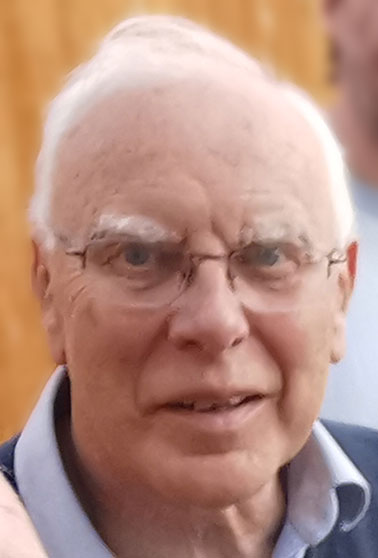
- Church: Church of England
- Diocese: Ripon and Leeds
- In office: 2000–2014
- Predecessor: David Young, Bishop of Ripon
- Successor: Merged into the Diocese of Leeds
- Other post: Bishop of Warrington (1996–2000)

Orders
- Ordination: 1970
- Consecration: 13 November 1996 by David Hope

Personal details
- Born: 10 October 1946 (age 80) Blackburn, Lancashire, England
- Denomination: Anglican
- Residence: Hollin House, Weetwood
- Spouse: Barbara Jack (m. 1971)
- Children: 1 daughter & 2 sons
- Education: Keble College, Oxford

Member of the House of Lords
- Lord Spiritual
- Bishop of Ripon and Leeds; 23 October 2006 – 31 January 2014

John Richard Packer (born 10 October 1946) is a retired British Anglican bishop. He was the only Bishop of Ripon and Leeds, serving from the renaming of the diocese from Ripon in 2000 to his 2014 retirement (prior to his former diocese's merge into the Diocese of Leeds at Easter that year).

== Early life and education ==
Born in Blackburn, Lancashire, firstly educated in Manchester Grammar School, Packer graduated from Keble College, Oxford, with a Bachelor of Arts (BA) in modern history in 1967 and from Ripon Hall, Oxford, with a Bachelor and an Oxford Master of Arts (MA Oxon) in theology in 1975.

== Ordained ministry ==
Packer became a deacon in 1970 and was Curate of St Helier, in Southwark, until 1973. Ordained as priest in 1971, he worked in Abingdon in Berkshire (and then Oxfordshire) from 1973 to 1977. Between 1973 and 1975, he was Tutor at Ripon Hall, and between 1975 and 1977 at Ripon College Cuddesdon. In the following, Packer was Vicar of Wath-upon-Dearne with Adwick-upon-Dearne until 1986, and from 1986 to 1991 team rector at Sheffield Manor. He was twice Rural Dean, firstly of Wath from 1983 to 1986, and secondly of Attercliffe in 1990 and 1991. Until 1996, he was Archdeacon of West Cumberland, having been also priest-in-charge in Bridekirk in 1995 and 1996.

=== Episcopal ministry ===
Packer was consecrated a bishop (alongside Peter Forster, Bishop of Chester) during a service at York Minster, by David Hope, Archbishop of York, on 13 November 1996. He was suffragan Bishop of Warrington until 2000, when he was appointed Bishop of Ripon and Leeds – he was the first (and as it turned out, only) bishop with that title, which had been changed from "Bishop of Ripon" only upon his predecessor's resignation. He was installed at Ripon Cathedral on 16 July 2000.

In 2006, he was called to the House of Lords as a Lord Spiritual. He was the Bishops' Parliamentary Spokesperson for immigration & asylum; urban affairs; and welfare reform.

Packer used his maiden speech in the House of Lords on 14 December 2006 to criticise the government's policy on asylum seekers, claiming that under the current policy refugees are being "made destitute, terrorised and imprisoned". His interest in the asylum issue materialised again in February 2007 when he appealed to the Home Office to halt the deportation of a woman, Aseng Nasoba, and her six children back to the Democratic Republic of Congo, saying that he feared for the family's safety if they were returned to their home country.

In 2012 he was instrumental in defeating the coalition government's plan to put a cap on benefits given to families, when his amendment to exclude child benefit from the plan was passed in the House of Lords. He retired as Bishop of Ripon and Leeds on 31 January 2014.

== Personal life ==
Since 1971, he has been married to Barbara Jack. They have one daughter - Catherine Pickford, Archdeacon of Northolt - and two sons.

== Styles ==
- The Reverend John Packer (1970–1991)
- The Venerable John Packer (1991–1996)
- The Right Reverend John Packer (1996–present)
