= Anna Eltringham =

British Anglican priest

The Right Reverend Anna Eltringham
- Bishop of Ripon
- Church: Church of England
- Province: Province of York
- Diocese: Anglican Diocese of Leeds
- In office: 2023–present
- Predecessor: Helen-Ann Hartley
- Previous posts: Team leader, Oxted benefice (2014–2023)

Orders
- Ordination: 2008 (deacon); 2009 (priest) by Tom Butler
- Consecration: 22 June 2023 by Stephen Cottrell

Personal details
- Born: 1974 (age 51–52) England
- Spouse: Nigel Eltringham
- Children: 2
- Education: St John's College, Durham

Anna Eltringham (born 1974) is an Anglican bishop. Since 2023 she has served as Bishop of Ripon in the Diocese of Leeds. From 2014 to 2023, she served as Team leader of the Oxted benefice.

== Early life ==
Eltringham was born in 1974, and she grew up in the West Country. She studied at business and anthropology at Durham University, where she was a member of St John's College, Durham, and she graduated with a Bachelor of Arts (BA) degree in 1996. She worked in strategic marketing until her call to ordained ministry.

== Ordained ministry ==
She studied at the South East Institute for Theological Education and was ordained deacon in 2008 and priest in 2009. After a curacy at Holy Innocents Church, South Norwood, she was Team Vicar of Oxted from 2014 to 2019; and Team Rector from 2019 to 2023. She was also Dean of Women's Ministry in the Anglican Diocese of Southwark from 2017 until her appointment as bishop. She was also an Honorary Chaplain to the Queen (QHC) from 2020 to 2022, and then an Honorary Chaplain to the King (KHC) from 2022 to 2023.

Eltringham was consecrated as a bishop by Stephen Cottrell, Archbishop of York, during a service at York Minster on 22 June 2023.

=== Views ===
In November 2023, she was one of 44 Church of England bishops who signed an open letter supporting the use of the Prayers of Love and Faith (i.e. blessings for same-sex couples) and called for "Guidance being issued without delay that includes the removal of all restrictions on clergy entering same-sex civil marriages, and on bishops ordaining and licensing such clergy".

Church of England titles
Preceded by Helen-Ann Hartley	Bishop of Ripon; 2023 to present	Incumbent
