= John Moorman =

British bishop

The Right Reverend John Moorman
- Bishop of Ripon
- Church: Church of England
- Diocese: Diocese of Ripon
- In office: 1959–1975
- Other post: Principal of Chichester Theological College (1946–1956)

Orders
- Ordination: 1929
- Consecration: 1959

Personal details
- Born: John Richard Humpidge Moorman; 4 June 1905
- Died: 13 January 1989 (aged 83)
- Denomination: Anglicanism
- Education: Emmanuel College, Cambridge

John Richard Humpidge Moorman (4 June 1905 – 13 January 1989) was an English divine, ecumenist and writer who was Bishop of Ripon from 1959 to 1975.

== Early life and education ==
Born in Leeds, the son of Frederic William Moorman (1872–1918), Professor of English Language at the University of Leeds, and his wife Frances Beatrice Humpidge (1867–1956), Moorman was educated at Gresham's School, Holt and Emmanuel College, Cambridge. He later gained the degree of Bachelor of Divinity (BD) in 1940 with his work The Sources for the Life of Saint Francis of Assisi.

== Ecclesiastical career ==
In 1929 Moorman was ordained and became a curate, first in Holbeck, Leeds and later in Leighton Buzzard. In 1935 he was appointed Rector of Fallowfield in Manchester.

During the Second World War Moorman resigned his living and worked as a farmhand in Wharfedale. During this period completed his thesis Church Life in England in the Thirteenth Century for the degree of Doctor of Divinity (DD) awarded by the University of Cambridge in 1945.

In 1945 Moorman went to Lanercost Priory, Cumberland and in 1946 re-opened Chichester Theological College. While there, he also served as Chancellor of Chichester Cathedral. In 1956 he resigned to concentrate on his Franciscan writings.

In 1959 Moorman was appointed Bishop of Ripon where he remained until his retirement in 1975. He was a frequent visitor to the Vatican and led a delegation of Anglican observers to the Second Vatican Council. In 1967 he became the chairman of the Anglican commission which led to the Anglican-Roman Catholic International Commission. He remained a member until 1981.

== Personal life ==
In 1930, Moorman married Mary Caroline Trevelyan (1905–1994), daughter of the historian G. M. Trevelyan OM CBE FRS FBA.

Moorman died in Durham on 13 January 1989, aged 83.

== Publications ==
- Sources for the Life of St Francis of Assisi (1940)
- Church Life In England In the Thirteenth Century (Cambridge University Press, 1945)
- A New Fioretti (1946)
- B. K. Cunningham, a Memoir (1947)
- St Francis of Assisi (1950, second edition 1976)
- The Grey Friars in Cambridge (Birkbeck Lectures, 1952)
- A History of the Church in England (Adam & Charles Black, 1953, 3rd revised edition 1973)
- The Curate of Souls (1958)
- The Path to Glory (1960)
- Vatican Observed (1967)
- A History of the Franciscan Order (1968)
- The Franciscans in England (1974)
- Richest of Poor Men (1977)
- The Anglican Spiritual Tradition (1983)
- Medieval Franciscan Houses (1983)

Religious titles
Preceded by George Armitage Chase	Bishop of Ripon; 1959–1975	Succeeded by Stuart Hetley Price
