= St Michael and All Angels Church, Headingley =

Headingley Parish Church
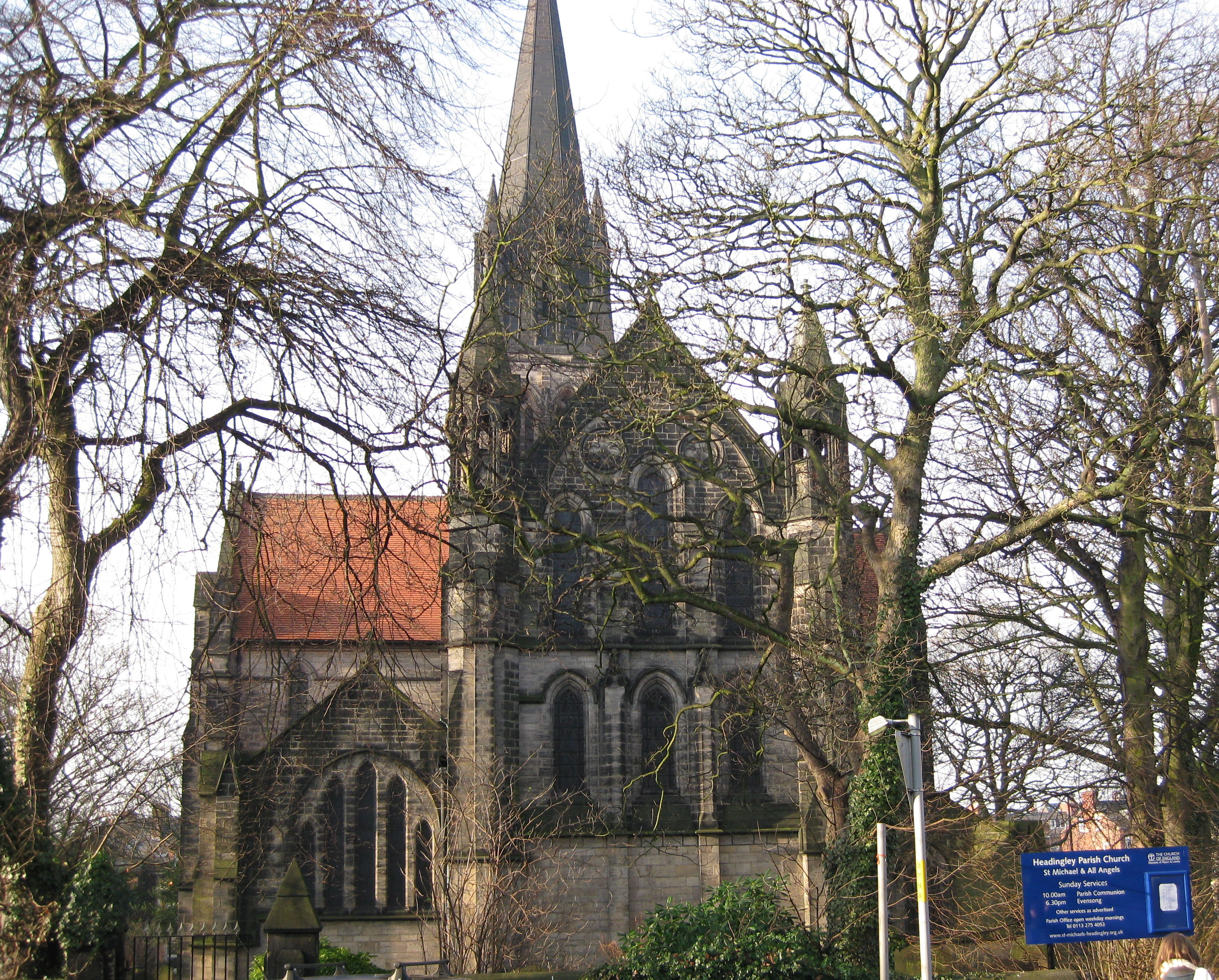
- Parish Church of St Michael and All Angels
- Headingley Parish Church
- 53.8191°N 1.5760°W
- OS grid reference: SE 28011 35957
- Location: Headingley, Leeds, West Yorkshire
- Country: England
- Denomination: Church of England
- Churchmanship: Inclusive catholic church
- Website: www.stmichaelsheadingley.org

History
- Dedication: St Michael and All Angels

Architecture
- Architect: J. L. Pearson

Administration
- Province: York
- Diocese: Leeds
- Archdeaconry: Leeds
- Deanery: Headingley
- Parish: St. Michael Headingley

Clergy
- Vicar: The Revd Dr Angela Birkin

Headingley Parish Church or the Parish Church of St Michael and All Angels in Headingley, a suburb of Leeds, in West Yorkshire, England is a Victorian Church of England parish church. It is a Grade II* listed building.

== History ==
The parish of Headingley was carved out of the once very large parish of Leeds, which at the time also included the districts of Armley, Beeston, Bramley and Hunslet. The first church on the site was built on land given in about 1620 by John Savile. This church remained in place for 210 years and could hold 200 congregants.

The Industrial Revolution brought population booms to northern England and the population of Headingley increased to 2,000 warranting the creation of a vicarcy in 1849 and the building of a larger, 600-seater, church in 1838, designed by the architect R. D. Chantrell.

However, this church was not to last: further increases in population meant that a new church was needed. Today's church is the third on the site and was consecrated in 1886.

With the growth in the local population a new parish of Far Headingley was created, and St Chad's Church, Far Headingley was built in 1868. The two churches have worked together in matters of child welfare. The Headingley Team of St Michael's and St Chad's have a tradition of undertaking welfare work dating back to the late 19th century, and during the Second World War St Chad's opened a home for the friendless girls' societies in Leeds. In recent years, the two churches hold early Sunday morning communion services alternately, and both participate in Churches Together in Headingley.

== Building and associated buildings ==
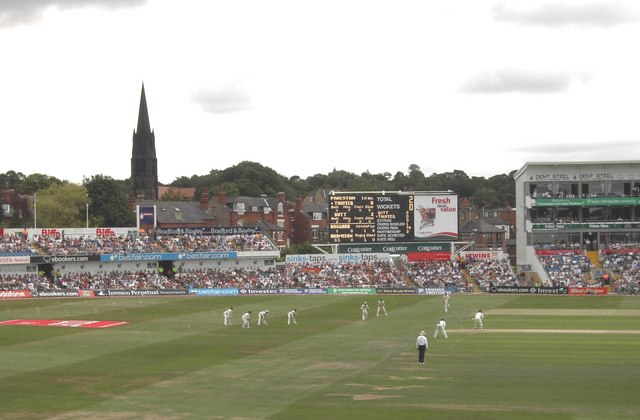
St Michael's seen from Headingley Cricket Ground

The church was designed by J. L. Pearson, architect of Truro Cathedral. It was built from 1884 to 1886, and the north porch was added and the spire completed in 1890. It is built of gritstone with a tiled roof, and is Grade II* listed. The church wall and gate piers are Grade II listed.

The Parish Hall was built in 1834 or 1844 as the Headingley National School, and is Grade II listed, as is the former Parochial Institute in Bennett Road, built in 1877 by George Corson and now used as offices.

== Services ==
Worship at the church is in the liberal catholic tradition of the Church of England, with both Sunday services being sung by the church's choir.

Sunday

- 10:00 am Parish Eucharist (Sung)
- 06:30 pm Evensong (Sung)

Tuesday

- 08:00 pm Compline (Said)

Wednesday

- 10:30 am Holy Communion (Said)

== Incumbents of Headingley ==
Period	Vicar of Headingley
In 1632	Robert Dobson
In 1641 & 1642	John Greenwood
In 1650	? Barratt
In 1657	? Bates (? Alexander Bate)
1662–[1671]	William Robinson
[1671]–1675	Richard Crashaw
1675–1676	John Briggs
1676–1711	Joseph Eammonson
1711–1713	John Benson
1713–1730	John Claphamson
1730–1732	John Murgatroyd
1732–1746	Samuel Dodgson
1746–1764	John Moore
1764–1769	Samuel Disney
1769–1782	William Lupton
1782	Jonathan Colton
1782–1836	John Smithson
1836–1863	William Williamson
1863–1865	William Fox Whitbread Torre
1865–1881	Henry Tuckwell
1881–1913	Frederick John Wood
1913–1918	George Arthur Hollis
1918–1933	Richard Henry Malden
1933–1956	Rowland John Wood
1956–[1966]	Ralph Emmerson
[1967]–1981	Christopher Luxmore
1981–1991	Owen Arnott Conway
1991–[2001]	Michael Cross
Period	Priest in Charge
[2001]–2011	David William Peat
2012–2014	Michael Anthony Whatmough
Period	Team Rector
2014 – 2020	Michael Anthony Whatmough
Period	Vicar of Headingley
2021– present	Angela Birkin

== See also ==
- List of new ecclesiastical buildings by J. L. Pearson
