= Howard Cruse (bishop) =

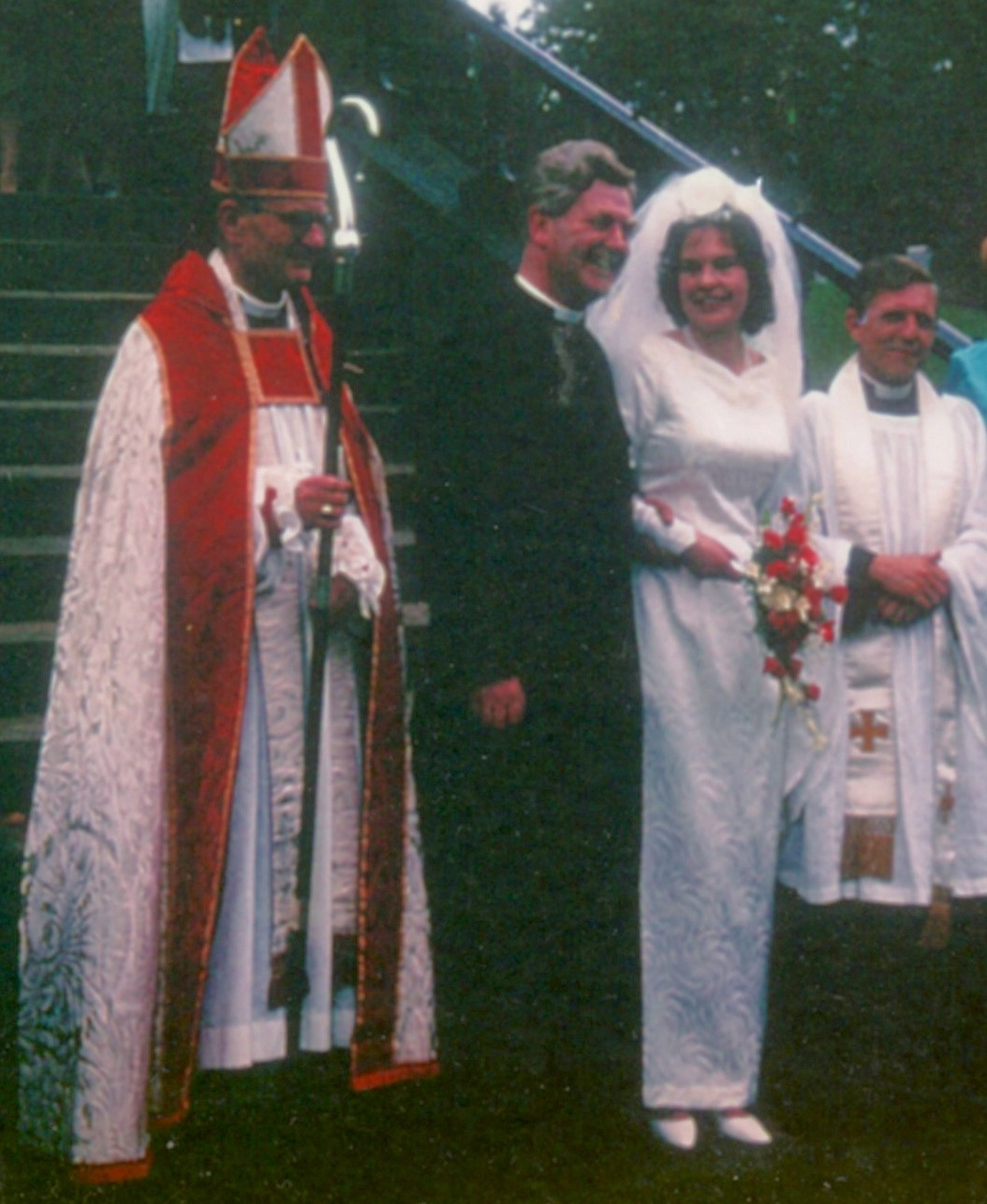
Bishop Cruse (left) at a wedding in 1965, shortly after his elevation to the episcopate.

John Howard Cruse (known as Howard; 15 February 1908 – 11 April 1979) was Bishop of Knaresborough from 1965 to 1972.

Cruse was educated at Jesus College, Cambridge and studied for ordination at Wycliffe Hall, Oxford before curacies at Southall and Folkestone. From 1936 until 1949 he held incumbencies at Harrow and Cambridge, followed by a 16-year stint as Provost of Sheffield. In 1965 he was appointed Suffragan Bishop of Knaresborough where he remained until his retirement. He married twice: firstly in 1942 Ethne Sterling-Berry; and after her death in 1977 Violet Briscoe.

Church of England titles
Preceded by Alfred Jarvis	Provost of Sheffield; 1949–1965	Succeeded by Ivan Neill
Preceded by Henry de Candole	Bishop of Knaresborough; 1965–1972	Succeeded by Ralph Emmerson
