= James Bell (bishop) =

British Anglican bishop

The Right Reverend James Bell
- area Bishop of Ripon
- Church: Church of England
- Diocese: Leeds (2014–2017); Ripon and Leeds (2004–2014)
- In office: 2004–2017
- Predecessor: Frank Weston
- Successor: Helen-Ann Hartley
- Other posts: Bishop of Knaresborough (name changed 2015) interim area bishop in Leeds (20–22 April 2014)

Orders
- Ordination: 1975
- Consecration: 2 March 2004 by David Hope

Personal details
- Born: 20 November 1950 (age 75)
- Denomination: Anglican
- Education: St John's College, Durham

James Harold Bell (born 20 November 1950) is a retired British Anglican bishop. He was the area Bishop of Ripon in the Diocese of Leeds.

== Early life ==
Bell studied modern history at St John's College, Durham (BA 1972). Then began a 10-year residence in Oxford, where from 1972 until 1975 he studied for ordination at Wycliffe Hall, meanwhile matriculating in the University of Oxford as a member of St Peter's Hall, taking a Bachelor of Arts (BA) in Theology in 1974 (having read for the Final Honour School alone) and incepting as an Oxford Master of Arts (MA Oxon) in 1978.

== Ordained ministry ==
Upon his ordination as a deacon in 1975 he was appointed Honorary Curate of Oxford St Michael with St Martin and All Saints and the following year, having been ordained priest, he because Chaplain and Lecturer of Brasenose College until 1982. He held several pastoral posts in West London before moving to the Diocese of Ripon and Leeds in 1997. Initially Director of Mission (and an Honorary Canon of Ripon Cathedral) he was appointed suffragan Bishop of Knaresborough following the death of Frank Weston.

Bell was consecrated a bishop by David Hope, Archbishop of York, during a service at York Minster on 2 March 2004. He was installed as Bishop of Knaresborough at Ripon Cathedral on 14 March 2004.

From 2004 until the creation of the Diocese of Leeds in 2014, Bell was suffragan Bishop of Knaresborough in the Diocese of Ripon and Leeds; upon the dissolution of the Ripon diocese and the erection of the Leeds diocese, Bell became area bishop for the Ripon area. His title remained Bishop of Knaresborough until that See was translated to Ripon (i.e. the title changed to Bishop of Ripon) by Order in Council of 19 March 2015.

On 23 October 2016, it was announced that Bell was to retire effective 30 April 2017.

== Styles ==
- The Reverend James Bell (1975–1997)
- The Reverend Canon James Bell (1997–2004)
- The Right Reverend James Bell (2004–present)

Church of England titles
Preceded by Frank Weston	Bishop of Knaresborough; 2004–2015	Succeeded by himself as area Bishop of Ripon
Preceded by himself as Bishop of Knaresborough	area Bishop of Ripon; 2015–2017	Succeeded by Helen-Ann Hartley
