= Bishop of Ripon (modern diocese) =

Former Church of England diocese in North Yorkshire, England

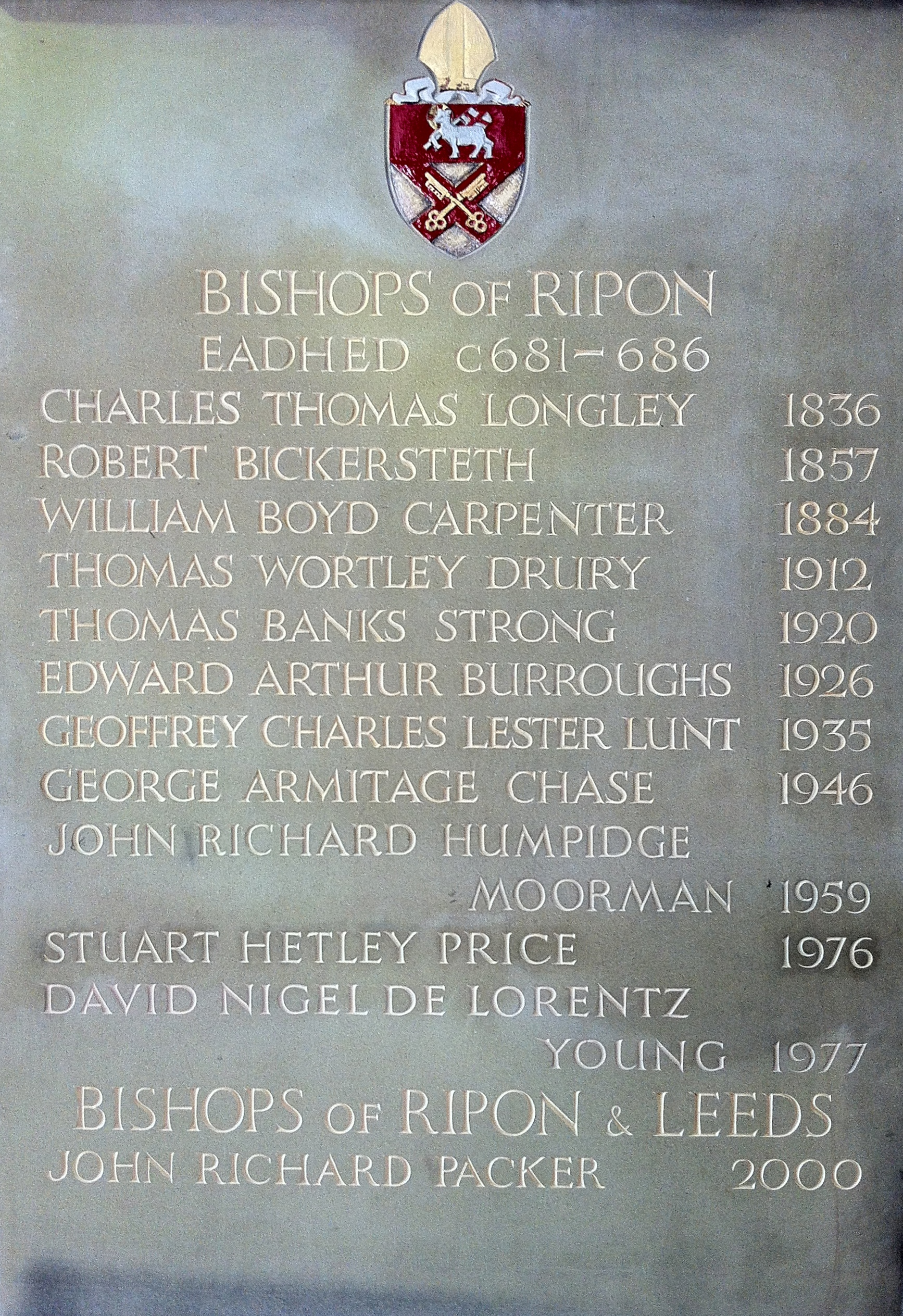
List inside Ripon Cathedral

The Bishop of Ripon was a diocesan bishop's title which took its name after the city of Ripon in North Yorkshire, England.

== History ==
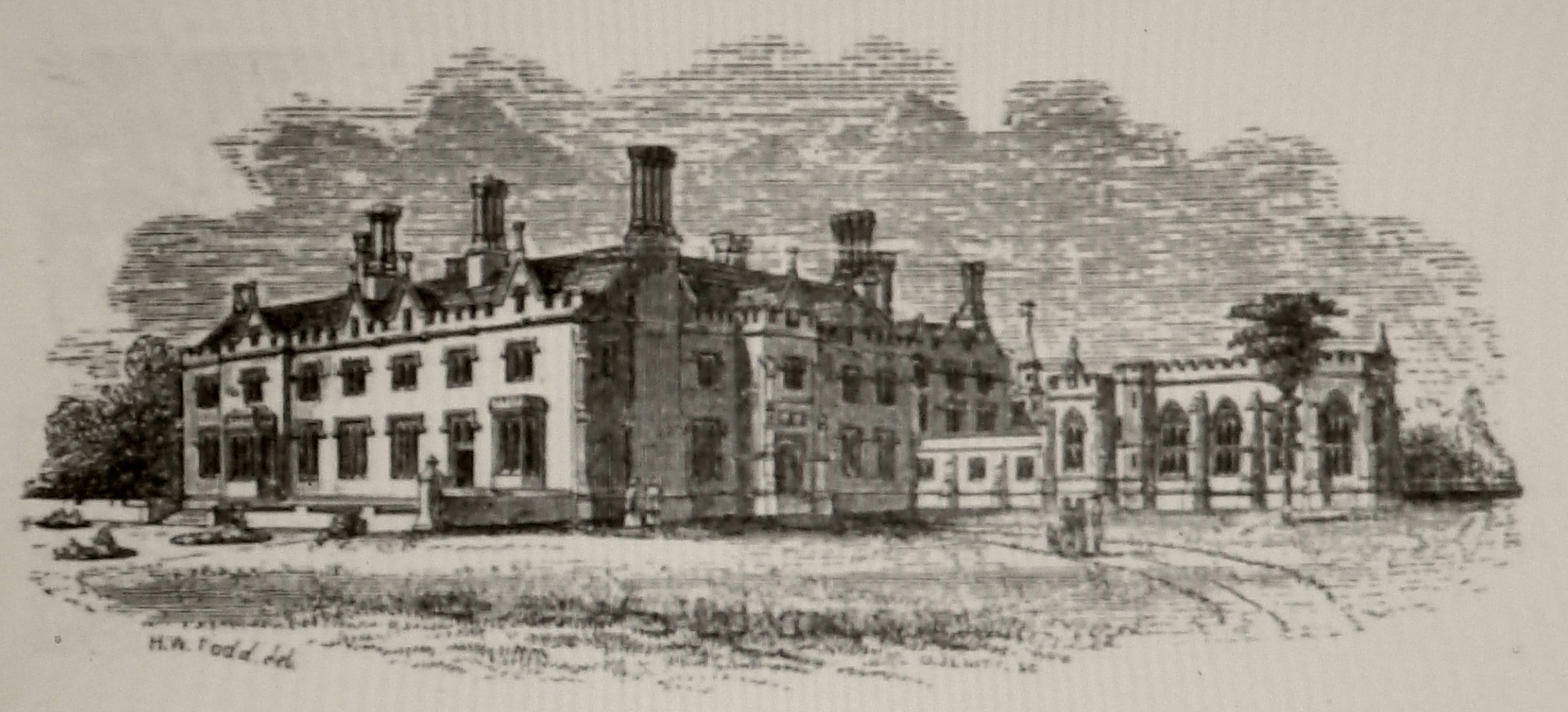
The original bishop's palace on Palace Road, Ripon

Though one ancient Bishop of Ripon is known - Eadhæd, who served in the late 7th century - the modern see of Ripon was established in 1836 from parts of the dioceses of Chester and York. In the same year, the collegiate church in Ripon was raised to the status of cathedral church. From 1905, the bishops of Ripon were assisted by the suffragan bishops of Knaresborough in overseeing the diocese. In 1999, the see changed its name to the Diocese of Ripon and Leeds, reflecting the growing importance of Leeds, the largest city within the diocese and one of the fastest-growing cities in Britain. The only bishop of Ripon and Leeds was John Packer, who signed John Ripon and Leeds, and retired on 31 January 2014.

The Diocese of Ripon and Leeds was dissolved on 20 April 2014 and its former territory was added to the new Diocese of Leeds. The suffragan title of Bishop of Knaresborough was then renamed to Bishop of Ripon, becoming an area bishop covering the northern part of the Diocese of Leeds. The first area Bishop of Ripon was James Bell, who had previously been the suffragan Bishop of Knaresborough, and acting diocesan Bishop of Ripon and Leeds until the dissolution of that diocese.

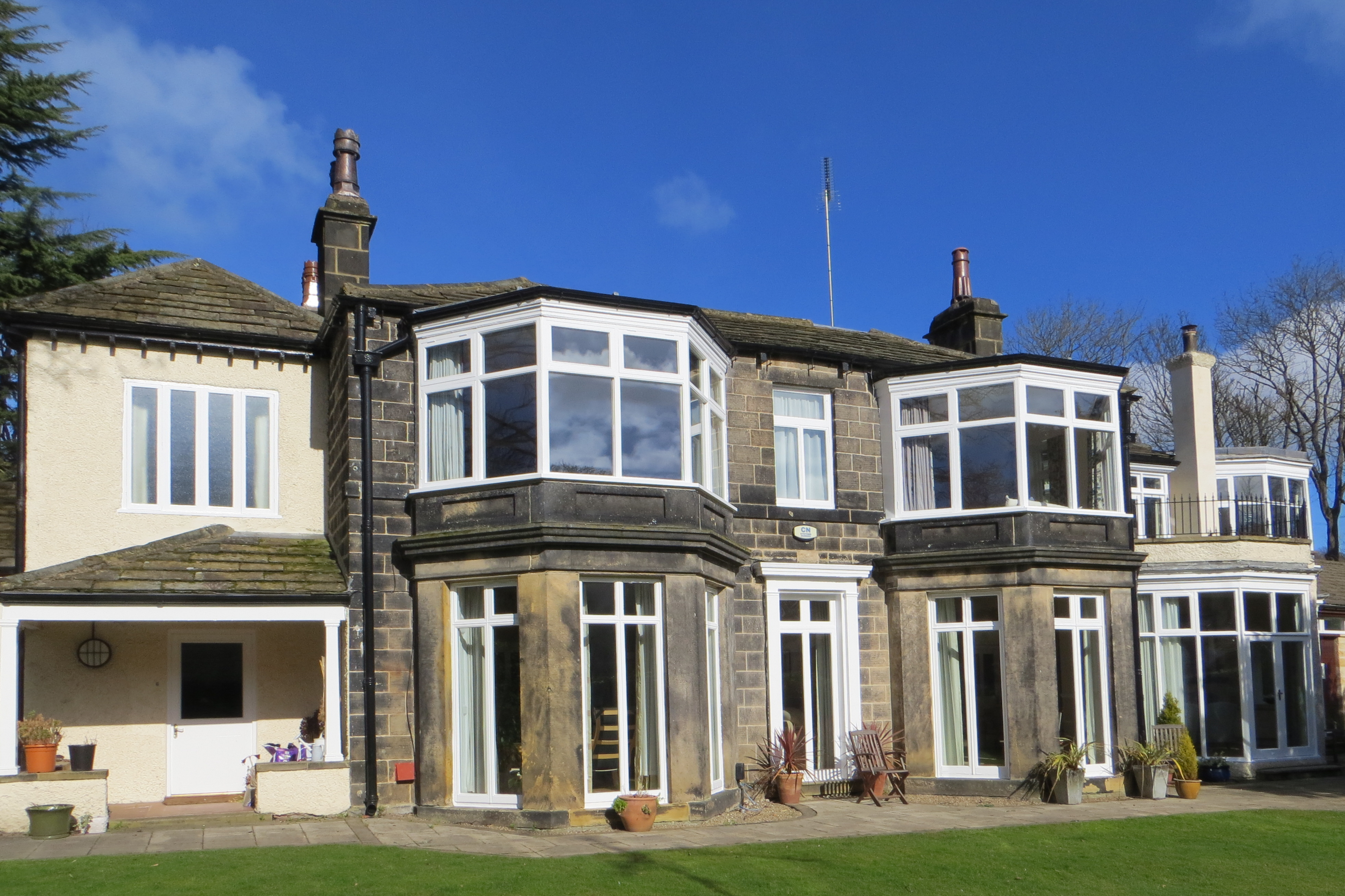
Hollin House, Leeds, the final diocesan palace

== Palace ==
In 1838-41, shortly after the creation of the see, a palace was constructed to the north of Ripon at an estimated cost of £10,000 (equivalent to £960,000 in 2025). A chapel was added in 1846–7.

In 1940, during World War II, this palace became a Barnardo's evacuation centre, with the bishops moving to a house nearby on Hutton Bank that was renamed Bishop Mount. This move was subsequently made permanent, and the old palace became Barnardo's Spring Hill School in 1950. The original palace was later divided into several residential dwellings.

In 2008, the diocesan bishop moved to Hollin House, a six-bedroom house in Weetwood, North Leeds. After the merger of the diocese of Ripon into the new Diocese of Leeds, this became the home of the Bishop of Leeds.

== List of bishops ==
Bishops of Ripon
From	Until	Incumbent	Notes
1836	1856	Charles Longley	Nominated on 15 October 1836 and consecrated on 6 November 1836. Translated to Durham in 1856.
1857	1884	Robert Bickersteth	Nominated on 17 December 1856 and consecrated on 18 January 1857. Died in office on 15 April 1884.
1884	1911	William Boyd Carpenter	Nominated on 11 June 1884 and consecrated on 25 July 1884. Resigned on 8 November 1911 and died on 26 October 1918.
1912	1920	Thomas Drury	Translated from Sodor and Man. Nominated on 22 November 1911 and confirmed on 4 February 1912. Resigned on 22 April 1920 and died on 12 February 1926.
1920	1925	Thomas Strong	Nominated on 24 June 1920 and consecrated on 24 August 1920. Translated to Oxford on 13 October 1925.
1926	1934	Edward Burroughs	Nominated on 29 October 1925 and consecrated on 6 January 1926. Died in office on 23 August 1934.
1935	1946	Geoffrey Lunt	Nominated on 19 November 1934 and consecrated on 25 January 1935. Translated to Salisbury on 9 October 1946.
1946	1959	George Chase	Nominated on 11 October 1946 and consecrated on 1 November 1946. Resigned on 6 April 1959 and died on 30 November 1971.
1959	1975	John Moorman	Nominated on 2 May 1959 and consecrated on 11 June 1959. Resigned on 30 November 1975 and died on 13 January 1989.
1976	1977	Hetley Price	Translated from Doncaster. Nominated on 10 February 1976 and confirmed on 18 March 1976. Died in office on 15 March 1977.
1977	1999	David Young	Nominated on 11 July 1977 and consecrated on 21 September 1977. Retired in 1999 and died on 10 August 2008.
Bishops of Ripon and Leeds
From	Until	Incumbent	Notes
2000	2014	John Packer	Translated from Warrington. Took office by confirmation of his election, prior to his installation on 16 July 2000. It was announced in September 2013 that he would retire in January 2014; with his final duties as bishop on 31 December 2013 and retirement on 31 January 2014.
2014		James Bell (acting bishop)	Suffragan Bishop of Knaresborough. Acted as diocesan bishop of Ripon and Leeds between Packer's retirement on 31 January 2014 and the dissolution of the diocese on 20 April 2014.

== Assistant bishops ==
Among those who served as "Assistant Bishop of Ripon" were:

- 1883–1884: Isaac Hellmuth, former Bishop of Huron and friend to Bickersteth
