= Bishop of Ripon =

Area bishop in the Church of England

The Bishop of Ripon is an episcopal title which takes its name after the city of Ripon in North Yorkshire, England. The bishop is one of the area bishops of the Diocese of Leeds in the Province of York. The area bishop of Ripon has oversight of the archdeaconry of Richmond and Craven, which consists of the deaneries of Bowland, Ewecross, Harrogate, Richmond, Ripon, Skipton, and Wensley.

The current title Bishop of Ripon is renamed from Bishop of Knaresborough, which was an episcopal title used by a suffragan bishop of the Church of England Dioceses of Ripon (later Ripon and Leeds) and then of Leeds, in the Province of York, England. The title took its name after the historic market and spa town of Knaresborough in North Yorkshire.

The Diocese of Ripon and Leeds was dissolved on 20 April 2014 and its former territory was added to the new Diocese of Leeds. The first Area Bishop of Ripon was James Bell, who had previously been the suffragan Bishop of Knaresborough and area bishop in Ripon, and was acting diocesan Bishop of Ripon and Leeds until the dissolution of that diocese.

Following the creation of the Diocese of Leeds on 20 April 2014, the see of Knaresborough was eventually renamed to become the suffragan see for the area Bishop of Ripon. To that end the General Synod approved a petition from the Bishop of Leeds in February 2015; that petition was approved by the Queen-in-Council on 19 March 2015 and so the see was translated to Ripon.

James Bell continued in the same See, becoming the area Bishop of Ripon. On 9 November 2017, it was announced that Helen-Ann Hartley, Bishop of Waikato (in Anglican Church in Aotearoa, New Zealand and Polynesia) was to become the next Bishop of Ripon and she was installed on 4 February 2018. On 3 February 2023, Hartley was translated to Newcastle. On 27 April 2023, it was announced that Anna Eltringham was to become the next area Bishop of Ripon; she took up the post with her episcopal consecration on 22 June 2023.

== List of bishops ==
Bishops of Knaresborough
From	Until	Incumbent	Notes
1905	1934	Lucius Smith	(1860–1934) Episcopal commissary (i.e. acting bishop diocesan) for the Diocese of Bradford from its erection in 1919 until the confirmation of the first Bishop of Bradford's election in 1920. Also: Archdeacon of Ripon/Leeds (1905–1934); canon residentiary (1905–1921); Rector of Methley (1921–1933)
1934	1938	Paul de Labilliere	(1879–1946). Also: Archdeacon of Leeds (throughout); Vicar of Christ Church, Harrogate (until 1935); Rector of Methley (from 1935). Afterwards Dean of Westminster.
1938	1948	John Bateman-Champain	(1880–1950) Also Rector of Methley
1948	1965	Henry de Candole	(1895–1971)
1965	1972	Howard Cruse	(1908–1979)
1972	1979	Ralph Emmerson	(1914–2008)
1979	1986	John Dennis	(1931–2020). Also Diocesan Director of Ordinands (1980–1986). Translated to St Edmundsbury & Ipswich.
1986	1997	Malcolm Menin	(1932-2026)
1997	2003	Frank Weston	(1935–2003)
2004	2015	James Bell	(born 1950) Area bishop for Ripon from 20 April 2014 and interim area bishop in Leeds, 20–22 April 2014; See translated to Ripon, 19 March 2015
Bishops of Ripon
From	Until	Incumbent	Notes
19 March 2015	2017	James Bell	previously Bishop of Knaresborough (which See translated by Order-in-Council 19 March 2015) and the area bishop for the Ripon episcopal area in the new Diocese of Leeds. Retired 30 April 2017.
2018	2023	Helen-Ann Hartley	translated from Waikato, New Zealand; installed 4 February 2018; translated to Newcastle, 3 February 2023.
2023	present	Anna Eltringham	consecrated 22 June 2023
