= Diocese of Ripon =

Church of England diocese, 1836 to 2014

Coordinates: 54.135°N 1.520°W

- Coat of arms

Location
- Ecclesiastical province: York
- Archdeaconries: Richmond, Leeds

Statistics
- Parishes: 161
- Churches: 269

Information
- Established: Modern diocese: 5 October 1836–20 April 2014
- Cathedral: Ripon Cathedral

Current leadership
- Bishop: Vacant at dissolution. Last bishop: John Packer, Bishop of Ripon and Leeds
- Suffragan: At dissolution: James Bell, Bishop of Knaresborough, acting Bishop of Ripon and Leeds
- Archdeacons: At dissolution: Paul Hooper, Archdeacon of Leeds; Archdeacon of Richmond (Vacant; Acting archdeacon: Paul Slater, Archdeacon of Craven)

Website
- riponleeds.anglican.org

The Diocese of Ripon, renamed the Diocese of Ripon and Leeds from 1999 until its amalgamation into the new Diocese of Leeds in 2014, was a former Church of England diocese within the Province of York. Immediately prior to its dissolution, it covered an area in western and northern Yorkshire as well as the south Teesdale area administered by County Durham which is traditionally part of Yorkshire. The cities of Ripon and Leeds were within its boundaries as were the towns of Harrogate, Richmond, Knaresborough, Hawes and Bedale and the surrounding countryside; its northern boundary was the River Tees.

The diocesan Bishop of Ripon had his cathedral church at Ripon. The diocese was also served by a suffragan Bishop of Knaresborough and was divided into two archdeaconries, those of Richmond and Leeds. For organizational purposes, the diocese was further divided into eight deaneries: Richmond, Wensley, Ripon, Harrogate, Allerton, Headingley, Armley and Whitkirk. The first four deaneries are located in the Archdeaconry of Richmond, and the latter four are in the Archdeaconry of Leeds. The former Diocese covered an area of 1,359 square miles, with a range of urban and rural parishes, these range from urban areas like Holbeck and Armley with New Wortley, urban centres like Ripon and Richmond and rural parishes like Danby Wiske with Hutton Bonneville in the Vale of Mowbray, Eryholme on the southern bank of the River Tees and Upper Nidderdale high in the Yorkshire Dales.

== History ==
The diocese of Ripon was originally created out of the dioceses of York and Chester in 1836 with Charles Thomas Longley consecrated as its first bishop. It was the first diocese to be created in England after the Reformation, and was erected on 5 October 1836 under the Established Church Act 1836.

In a process which began with commission recommendations in 1989 and in 1997, including Diocesan Synod on 20 June 1998, General Synod approval in November 1998 and royal assent in May 1999, the diocese was renamed 'The Diocese of Ripon and Leeds' in order to reflect the demographic importance of Leeds within its boundaries; the name change to come into effect on 3 September 1999, the day after David Young's retirement as bishop. The diocesan bishop's residence and offices and the diocesan offices were based in Leeds, while the cathedral remained Ripon Cathedral; after 1999, the diocese was known as Ripon and Leeds diocese, or, less often, Ripon diocese. The central importance of Leeds to the area was further recognised in the eventual creation of the new Diocese of Leeds.

== Merger ==
On 2 March 2013, the diocesan synod voted in favour of proposals to abolish the diocese in order to create a larger Leeds diocese; the proposal was approved on 8 July 2013 by the General Synod. The merger came into force on 20 April 2014, at which point the Bradford, Ripon and Leeds and Wakefield dioceses merged.

== Bibliography ==
- Church of England Statistics 2002
