= List of Church of England dioceses =

Dioceses of the Church of England: Province of Canterbury Province of York

There are 42 dioceses of the Church of England. These cover England, the Isle of Man, the Channel Islands and a small part of Wales. The Diocese in Europe is also a part of the Church of England, and covers the whole of continental Europe, Morocco and the post-Soviet states. The structure of dioceses within the Church of England was initially inherited from the Catholic Church as part of the English Reformation. During the Reformation a number of new dioceses were founded, but no more were then created until the middle of the 19th century, when dioceses were founded mainly in response to the growing population, especially in the northern industrial cities. The most recent diocese to be established was the Diocese of Leeds, which came into being on 20 April 2014. Prior to that, no new dioceses had been created since 1927. Leeds was created by combining three previous dioceses: the Diocese of Bradford, the Diocese of Ripon and Leeds, and the Diocese of Wakefield.

The 42 current dioceses are divided into two provinces. The Province of Canterbury in the south comprises 30 dioceses and the Province of York in the north comprises 12. The archbishops of Canterbury and York have pastoral oversight over the bishops within their province, along with certain other rights and responsibilities. Each diocese has one cathedral, except for the Diocese of Leeds, which has three that are considered co-equal. Of all the dioceses, Derby has the smallest cathedral: Derby Cathedral takes up only 10,950 square feet (1,000 m^{2}). One diocese dates back to the 6th century, eight date back to the 7th century, two to the 10th century, five to the 11th century, two to the 12th century, five to the 16th century, seven to the 19th century, and ten to the 20th century. The territories administered by the various dioceses generally accord with the counties as they existed before the Local Government Act 1972.

== Dioceses ==
Diocese (bishop)	Coat of arms	Province	Territory	Cathedral	Founded
Bath and Wells (Bishop)		Canterbury	Somerset; North Somerset; Bath and North East Somerset; the parish of Thorncombe in Dorset	Wells Cathedral	909 (Diocese of Wells)
Birmingham (Bishop)		Canterbury	Birmingham; Sandwell except part of the north; Solihull except part of the east; part of Warwickshire; some parishes in Worcestershire	St Philip's Cathedral	1905
Blackburn (Bishop)		York	Lancashire except part of the east and south, Liverpool, and Manchester; some parishes in Wigan	Blackburn Cathedral	12 November 1926 (from Manchester)
Bristol (Bishop)		Canterbury	Bristol; southern two-thirds of South Gloucestershire; northern quarter of Wiltshire except part of the north; Swindon except part of the north and south; some parishes in Gloucestershire	Bristol Cathedral	1542
Canterbury (Archbishop)		Canterbury	Kent east of Medway	Canterbury Cathedral	597
Carlisle (Bishop)		York	Cumbria except Alston Moor (part of the Diocese of Newcastle), and the former Sedbergh Rural District (part of the Diocese of Leeds)	Carlisle Cathedral	1133
Chelmsford (Bishop)		Canterbury	Essex except part of the north; part of East London north of the River Thames; part of South Cambridgeshire	Chelmsford Cathedral	1914
Chester (Bishop)		York	Cheshire; the Wirral Peninsula; Halton south of the River Mersey; Warrington south of the River Mersey; Trafford except part of the north; Stockport except part of the north and east; the eastern half of Tameside; part of Derbyshire; part of Manchester; part of Flintshire	Chester Cathedral	1541
Chichester (Bishop)		Canterbury	West Sussex except part of the north; East Sussex except part of the north; part of Kent	Chichester Cathedral	1075
Coventry (Bishop)		Canterbury	Coventry; Warwickshire except part of the north, southwest, and south; part of Solihull	Coventry Cathedral	1918
Derby (Bishop)		Canterbury	Derbyshire except part of the north; part of Stockport; part of Staffordshire	Derby Cathedral	1927
Durham (Bishop)		York	Durham except part of the southwest and north; Gateshead; South Tyneside; Sunderland; Hartlepool; Darlington; Stockton-on-Tees north of the River Tees	Durham Cathedral	990
Ely (Bishop)		Canterbury	Cambridgeshire except part of the northwest and south; the western quarter of Norfolk; part of Bedfordshire	Ely Cathedral	1109
Europe (Bishop)		Canterbury	Europe except Great Britain and Ireland; Morocco; Turkey; the post-Soviet states in Asia	Gibraltar Cathedral	21 August 1842 (Diocese of Gibraltar); 1980 (Diocese in Europe)
Exeter (Bishop)		Canterbury	Devon except part of the southeast and west; Plymouth; Torbay	Exeter Cathedral	1050
Gloucester (Bishop)		Canterbury	Gloucestershire except part of the north, south, and east; the northern third of South Gloucestershire; part of Wiltshire; part of southwest Warwickshire; part of southern Worcestershire	Gloucester Cathedral	1541
Guildford (Bishop)		Canterbury	The western two-thirds of Surrey south of the River Thames except part of the northeast; part of northeastern Hampshire; part of Greater London; part of West Sussex	Guildford Cathedral	1927
Hereford (Bishop)		Canterbury	Herefordshire; the southern half of Shropshire; part of Powys and Monmouthshire	Hereford Cathedral	676
Leeds (Bishop)		York	Ripon; Bradford; Leeds; Huddersfield; Wakefield	Co-equally: Ripon Cathedral, Wakefield Cathedral, Bradford Cathedral	20 April 2014 (thereby dissolving the dioceses of Bradford, Ripon and Leeds, and Wakefield)
Leicester (Bishop)		Canterbury	Leicestershire; part of Northamptonshire, Derbyshire, and Warwickshire	Leicester Cathedral	1926
Lichfield (Bishop)		Canterbury	Staffordshire except part of the southeast and southwest; the northern half of Shropshire; Wolverhampton; Walsall; the northern half of Sandwell	Lichfield Cathedral	664
Lincoln (Bishop)		Canterbury	Lincolnshire; North East Lincolnshire; North Lincolnshire except part of the west	Lincoln Cathedral	1074
Liverpool (Bishop)		York	Liverpool; Sefton; Knowsley; St Helens; Wigan except part of the north and east; Halton north of the River Mersey; most of West Lancashire	Liverpool Cathedral	1880
London (Bishop)		Canterbury	The City of London; Greater London north of the River Thames except part of the east and north; Surrey north of the Thames; part of Hertfordshire	St Paul's Cathedral	601
Manchester (Bishop)		York	Manchester except part of the south; Salford; Bolton; Bury; Rochdale; Oldham; the western half of Tameside; part of Wigan, Trafford, Stockport, and southern Lancashire	Manchester Cathedral	1848
Newcastle (Bishop)		York	Northumberland; Newcastle upon Tyne; North Tyneside; part of eastern Cumbria; part of County Durham	Newcastle Cathedral	1882
Norwich (Bishop)		Canterbury	Norfolk except part of the west; part of northeastern Suffolk	Norwich Cathedral	1096
Oxford (Bishop)		Canterbury	Oxfordshire; Berkshire; Buckinghamshire; part of Hampshire and Hertfordshire	Christ Church Cathedral	1542
Peterborough (Bishop)		Canterbury	Northamptonshire except part of the west; Rutland; Peterborough except part of the southeast; part of Lincolnshire	Peterborough Cathedral	1541
Portsmouth (Bishop)		Canterbury	The southeastern third of Hampshire; the Isle of Wight	Portsmouth Cathedral	1927
Rochester (Bishop)		Canterbury	Kent west of the River Medway except part of the southwest; Medway; most of Bromley Bexley; part of East Sussex	Rochester Cathedral	604
St Albans (Bishop)		Canterbury	Hertfordshire except part of the south and west; Bedfordshire except part of the north and west; part of Greater London	St Albans Cathedral	1877
St Edmundsbury and Ipswich (Bishop)		Canterbury	Suffolk except part of the northeast; part of Essex	St Edmundsbury Cathedral	1914
Salisbury (Bishop)		Canterbury	The southern three quarters of Wiltshire; Dorset except part of the east; part of Hampshire and Devon; the Channel Islands	Salisbury Cathedral	1078
Sheffield (Bishop)		York	Sheffield; Rotherham; Doncaster except part of the southeast; part of North Lincolnshire; part of northeastern Barnsley; part of the East Riding of Yorkshire	Sheffield Cathedral	1914
Sodor and Man (Bishop)		York	The Isle of Man	Peel Cathedral	c. 1400 (English jurisdiction); 447 (first founded)
Southwark (Bishop)		Canterbury	Greater London south of the River Thames except most of Bromley and Bexley and part of the southwest; the eastern third of Surrey	Southwark Cathedral	1905
Southwell and Nottingham (Bishop)		York	Nottinghamshire; part of South Yorkshire	Southwell Minster	1884
Truro (Bishop)		Canterbury	Cornwall; the Isles of Scilly; part of Devon	Truro Cathedral	1877
Winchester (Bishop)		Canterbury	Hampshire except the southeastern quarter and part of the northeast, west, and north; part of eastern Dorset	Winchester Cathedral	662
Worcester (Bishop)		Canterbury	Worcestershire except part of the south and north; part of Wolverhampton, Sandwell, and northern Gloucestershire	Worcester Cathedral	680
York (Archbishop)		York	York; East Riding of Yorkshire except part of the southwest; Kingston upon Hull; Redcar and Cleveland; Middlesbrough; the eastern half of North Yorkshire; Stockton-on-Tees south of the River Tees; part of Leeds	York Minster	625

=== Former dioceses ===
Diocese (bishop)	Coat of arms	Province	Territory	Cathedral	Founded	Dissolved
Bradford (Bishop)		York	Bradford; Craven District; the former Sedbergh Rural District	Bradford Cathedral	25 November 1919	20 April 2014
Gloucester and Bristol (Bishop)		Canterbury	Gloucestershire except part of the north and east; South Gloucestershire; part of northern Wiltshire; part of southwest Warwickshire; part of southern Worcestershire; Bristol; Swindon except part of the north and south	Co-equally: Gloucester Cathedral, Bristol Cathedral	6 October 1836	7 July 1897
Ripon and Leeds (Bishop)		York	Part of western and northern Yorkshire; the south Teesdale area	Ripon Cathedral	5 October 1836	20 April 2014
Wakefield (Bishop)		York	Wakefield; Barnsley; Kirklees; Calderdale	Wakefield Cathedral	18 May 1888	20 April 2014
Westminster (Bishop)		Canterbury	Westminster; Middlesex except Fulham	Westminster Abbey	17 December 1540	30 March 1550

== Statistics ==
Source: Diocese of Europe excluded.

Approximate statistics
Diocese	Population	Area (sq. miles)	Pop. density (per sq. mile)	Benefices	Parishes	Churches	People per church
Bath & Wells	980,000	1610	600	175	460	557	1,759
Birmingham	1,599,000	290	5420	138	149	180	8,883
Blackburn	1,384,000	930	1480	170	230	276	5,014
Bristol	1,065,000	470	2230	100	167	202	5,272
Canterbury	981,000	970	1020	99	201	313	3,134
Carlisle	498,000	2570	190	104	227	323	1,542
Chelmsford	3,279,000	1530	2130	303	469	575	5,703
Chester	1,677,000	1030	1600	214	264	337	4,976
Chichester	1,704,000	1450	1180	274	348	474	3,595
Coventry	896,000	700	1320	125	204	240	3,733
Derby	1,064,000	990	1080	139	253	312	3,410
Durham	1,475,000	980	1530	169	207	258	5,717
Ely	803,000	1530	500	141	303	327	2,456
Exeter	1,214,000	2570	470	149	484	594	2,044
Gloucester	690,000	1130	610	90	296	377	1,830
Guildford	1,077,000	530	2020	142	160	211	5,104
Hereford	322,000	1650	200	77	338	399	807
Leeds	2,777,000	2630	1060	264	442	580	4,788
Leicester	1,086,000	830	1290	103	245	311	3,492
Lichfield	2,202,000	1730	1270	234	422	542	4,063
Lincoln	1,093,000	2670	410	180	476	622	1,757
Liverpool	1,621,000	390	4130	125	168	233	6,957
London	4,246,000	280	16010	408	402	471	9,015
Manchester	2,233,000	420	5330	175	256	320	6,978
Newcastle	832,000	2100	400	123	170	235	3,540
Norwich	928,000	1800	520	158	554	640	1,450
Oxford	2,511,000	2210	1100	285	609	811	3,096
Peterborough	971,000	1140	830	127	347	379	2,562
Portsmouth	784,000	420	1900	105	132	165	4,752
Rochester	1,375,000	540	2570	171	210	258	5,329
Salisbury	1,148,000	2130	539	164	463	609	1,885
Sheffield	1,278,000	610	2140	141	169	208	6,144
Sodor & Man	86,000	220	390	14	15	38	2,263
Southwark	2,880,000	320	9030	263	295	355	8,113
Southwell & Nottingham	1,152,000	840	1390	151	226	296	3,892
St Albans	1,978,000	1120	1750	187	338	403	4,908
St Eds & Ipswich	684,000	1430	480	111	444	481	1,422
Truro	573,000	1390	420	96	214	298	1,923
Winchester	1,255,000	1130	1100	132	240	352	3,565
Worcester	908,000	670	1350	84	166	273	3,326
York	1,457,000	2670	550	231	441	574	2,538

== See also ==
- Church of England § Structure
- Historical development of Church of England dioceses
- List of Anglican dioceses in the United Kingdom and Ireland
- List of cathedrals in the United Kingdom
- Armorial of the Church of England

== Bibliography ==
- Avis, Paul (2013). The Anglican Understanding of the Church: An Introduction (2nd ed.). London: Society for Promoting Christian Knowledge. ISBN 978-0-281-06815-9.
- Bond, Francis (2007). The Cathedrals of England and Wales. Huddersfield, England: Jeremy Mills Publishing. ISBN 978-1-905217-82-3.
- Buchanan, Colin (2006). Historical Dictionary of Anglicanism. Lanham, Maryland: Rowman & Littlefield. ISBN 978-0-8108-6506-8.
- The Church of England Year Book (130th ed.). London: Church House Publishing. 2014. ISBN 978-0-7151-1071-3.
- Cormack, Patrick (1984). English Cathedrals. Harmony Books. ISBN 978-0-517-55409-8.
- Cummings, Owen F. (2007). Canterbury Cousins: The Eucharist in Contemporary Anglican Theology. Mahwah, New Jersey: Paulist Press. ISBN 978-0-8091-4490-7.
- Foster, Andy (2005). Birmingham. New Haven, Connecticut: Yale University Press. ISBN 978-0-300-10731-9.
- Galloway, Peter (1999). A Passionate Humility: Frederick Oakeley and the Oxford Movement. Leominster, England: Gracewing Publishing. ISBN 978-0-85244-506-8.
- Jones, Ian (2012). The Local Church and Generational Change in Birmingham, 1945–2000. Woodbridge, England: The Boydell Press. ISBN 978-0-86193-317-4.
- Livingstone, E. A.; Sparks, M. W. D.; Peacocke, R. W., eds. (2013). The Concise Oxford Dictionary of the Christian Church (3rd ed.). Oxford University Press. ISBN 978-0-19-965962-3.
- Mullett, Michael (2010). Historical Dictionary of the Reformation and Counter-Reformation. Lanham, Maryland: Rowman & Littlefield. ISBN 978-0-8108-7393-3.
- Nicholls, J. F.; Taylor, John (1881). Bristol Past and Present. Vol. 1. Bristol, England: J. W. Arrowsmith.
- Pepin, David (2004). Discovering Cathedrals. Oxford: Osprey Publishing. ISBN 978-0-7478-0597-7.
- Podmore, Colin (2005). Aspects of Anglican Identity. London: Church House Publishing. ISBN 978-0-7151-4074-1.
- Ren, C. H. (2011). Christianity and the Future. Thomas Nelson. ISBN 978-1-4497-1380-5.
- Tate, William Edward (1969). The Parish Chest: A Study of the Records of Parochial Administration in England. Cambridge University Press. ISBN 978-0-521-06603-7.
- Weaver, Jeffrey; Caviness, Madeline H. (2013). The Ancestors of Christ Windows at Canterbury Cathedral. Los Angeles: Getty Publications. ISBN 978-1-60606-146-6.
- Weaver, Mary Jo; Brakke, David (2008). Introduction to Christianity (4th ed.). Cengage Learning. ISBN 978-0-495-09726-6.
- Wilson, Fiona M. (2013). Organizational Behaviour and Work: A Critical Introduction. Oxford University Press. ISBN 978-0-19-964598-5.
