= Archdeacon of Bradford =

Church of England ecclesiastical office

The Archdeacon of Bradford is a senior ecclesiastical officer within the Diocese of Leeds. The archdeaconry was originally created within the now-defunct Diocese of Bradford by Order in Council on 25 February 1921.

As Archdeacon she or he is responsible for the disciplinary supervision of the clergy within four area deaneries: Airedale, Bowling & Horton, Calverley and Otley.

Since the creation of the Diocese of Leeds on 20 April 2014, the archdeaconry forms the Bradford episcopal area under the Area Bishop of Bradford.

== List of archdeacons ==
- 1921–1928: William Stanton Jones
- 1928–1932: Cecil Wilson (also Provost of Bradford, 1930–1931)
- 1932–1934: Frederick Ackerley
- 1934–1953: Sidney Lowe
- 1953–1957: Kenneth Kay
- 1957–1965: Hubert Higgs
- 1965–1977: William Johnston
- 1977–1984: Frank Sargeant
- 1984–1999: David Shreeve
- 1999–2004: Guy Wilkinson
- 2004–2015: David Lee
- Alistair Helm (Acting)
- 17 January 2016–present: Andy Jolley
