= Historical development of Church of England dioceses =

Current dioceses of the Church of England.

This article traces the historical development of the dioceses and cathedrals of the Church of England. It is customary in England to name each diocese after the city where its cathedral is located. Occasionally, when the bishop's seat has been moved from one city to another, the diocese may retain both names, for example Bath and Wells. More recently, where a cathedral is in a small or little-known town or city, the diocesan name has been changed to include the name of a nearby larger city: thus the cathedral in Southwell now serves the diocese of Southwell and Nottingham, and Ripon Cathedral was in Ripon and Leeds from 1999 until 2014. Cathedrals, like other churches, are dedicated to a particular saint or holy object, or Christ himself, but are commonly referred to by the name of the city where they stand. A cathedral is, simply, the church where the bishop has his chair or "cathedra".

The forty-two dioceses of the Church of England are administrative territorial units each governed by a bishop. Forty-one dioceses cover England, the Isle of Man, the Channel Islands, the Isles of Scilly, and a small part of Wales. One diocese, the Diocese in Europe, is also a part of the Church of England (rather than a separate Anglican church such as the Church in Wales), and covers the whole of mainland Europe, the countries of Morocco and Turkey, and the territory of the former Soviet Union.

The structure of the dioceses within the Church of England was initially inherited from the Catholic Church as part of the English Reformation. During the Reformation, a number of new dioceses were founded. No new English or Welsh dioceses were then created until the middle of the 19th century, when dioceses were founded mainly in response to the growing population, especially in the northern industrial cities.

From 1787, the Anglican church also erected 41 dioceses outside these isles (see § colonial dioceses); these were part of the Church of England until they were separated from the home Church in 1863. From 1801 until 1871, the dioceses of Ireland were also part of the United Church of England and Ireland. In 1920 (by the Welsh Church Act 1914), the Welsh dioceses were separated to form the Church in Wales.

The last dioceses were created in 1927. The 42 dioceses are divided between two Provinces: the Province of Canterbury (with 30 dioceses) and the Province of York (with 12 dioceses). The archbishops of Canterbury and York have pastoral oversight over the bishops within their province, along with certain other rights and responsibilities.

== History ==
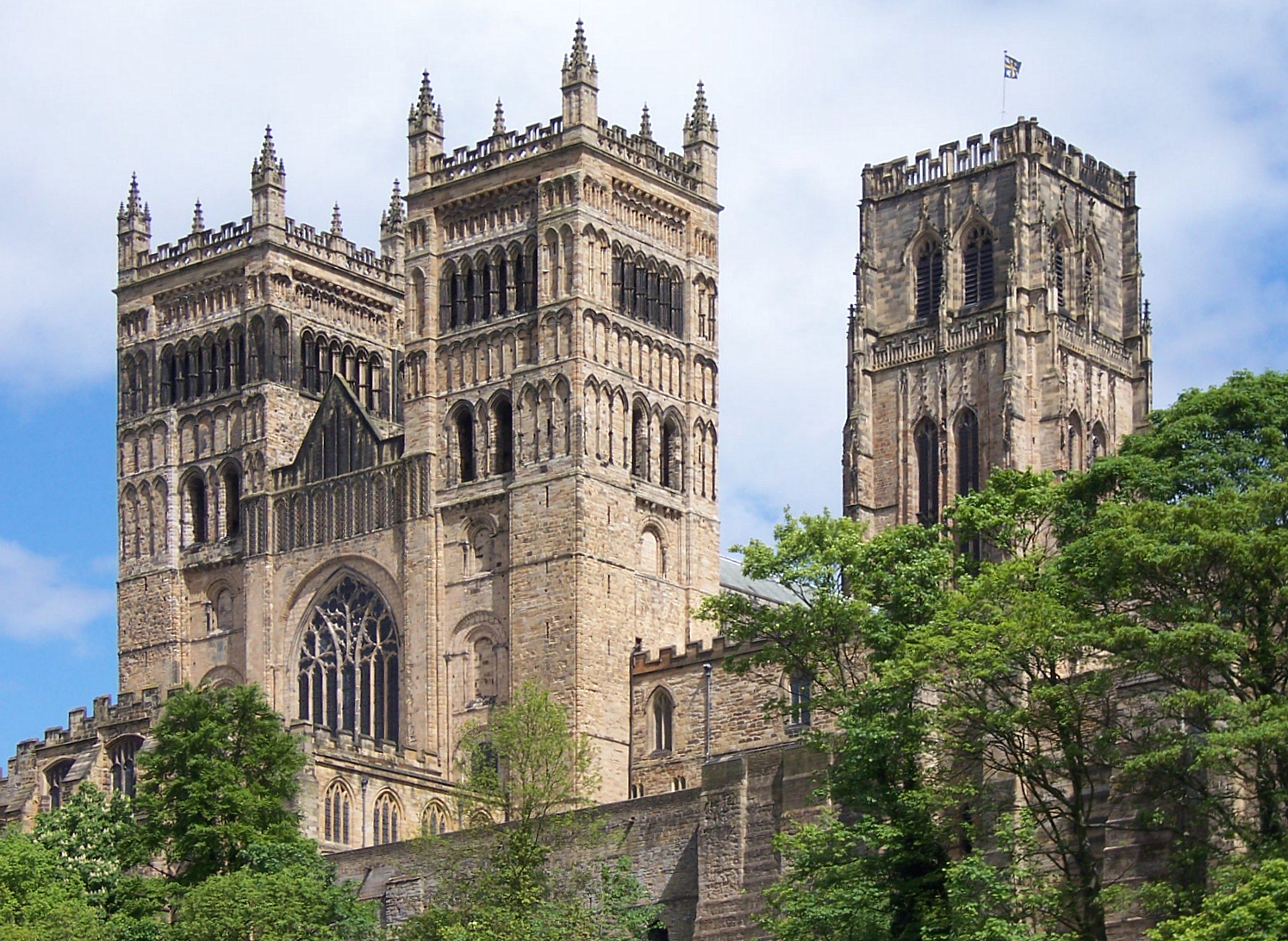
Durham Cathedral was under Benedictine rule.

The history of the cathedrals in Great Britain differs somewhat from that of their European continental counterparts. British cathedrals have always been fewer in number than those of Italy, France, and other parts of Europe, while the buildings themselves have tended to be much larger. While France, at the time of the French Revolution, had 136 cathedrals, England had 27. Because of a ruling that no cathedral could be built in a village, any town in which a cathedral was located was elevated to city status, regardless of its size. To this day several large English cathedrals are located in small "cathedral cities", notably Wells and Ely Cathedrals, both of which rank among the greatest works of English Medieval architecture.

=== Early organisation ===
In earlier times, populations were sparsely spread and towns were few. The population of the kingdom of England in the 11th century is estimated at between one and two million, with Lincolnshire, East Anglia, and East Kent the most densely populated areas; in other parts of the country many villages had been razed by the conquest armies. Instead of exercising jurisdiction over geographical areas, many of the bishops were linked to tribes or peoples, as the bishops of the South Saxons, the West Saxons, the Somersætas, etc. The cathedra of such a bishop was often migratory.

In 1075 a council was held in London, under the presidency of Archbishop Lanfranc, which, reciting the decrees of the council of Sardica held in 347 and that of Laodicea held in 360 on this matter, ordered the bishop of the South Saxons to remove his see from Selsey to Chichester; the Wiltshire and Dorset bishop to remove his cathedra from Sherborne to Old Sarum, and the Mercian bishop, whose cathedral was then at Lichfield, to transfer it to Chester. Traces of the tribal and migratory system may still be noted in the designations of the Irish see of Meath (where the result has been that there is now no cathedral church) and Ossory, the cathedral church of which is at Kilkenny. Some of the Scottish sees were also migratory.

=== Late Middle Ages ===
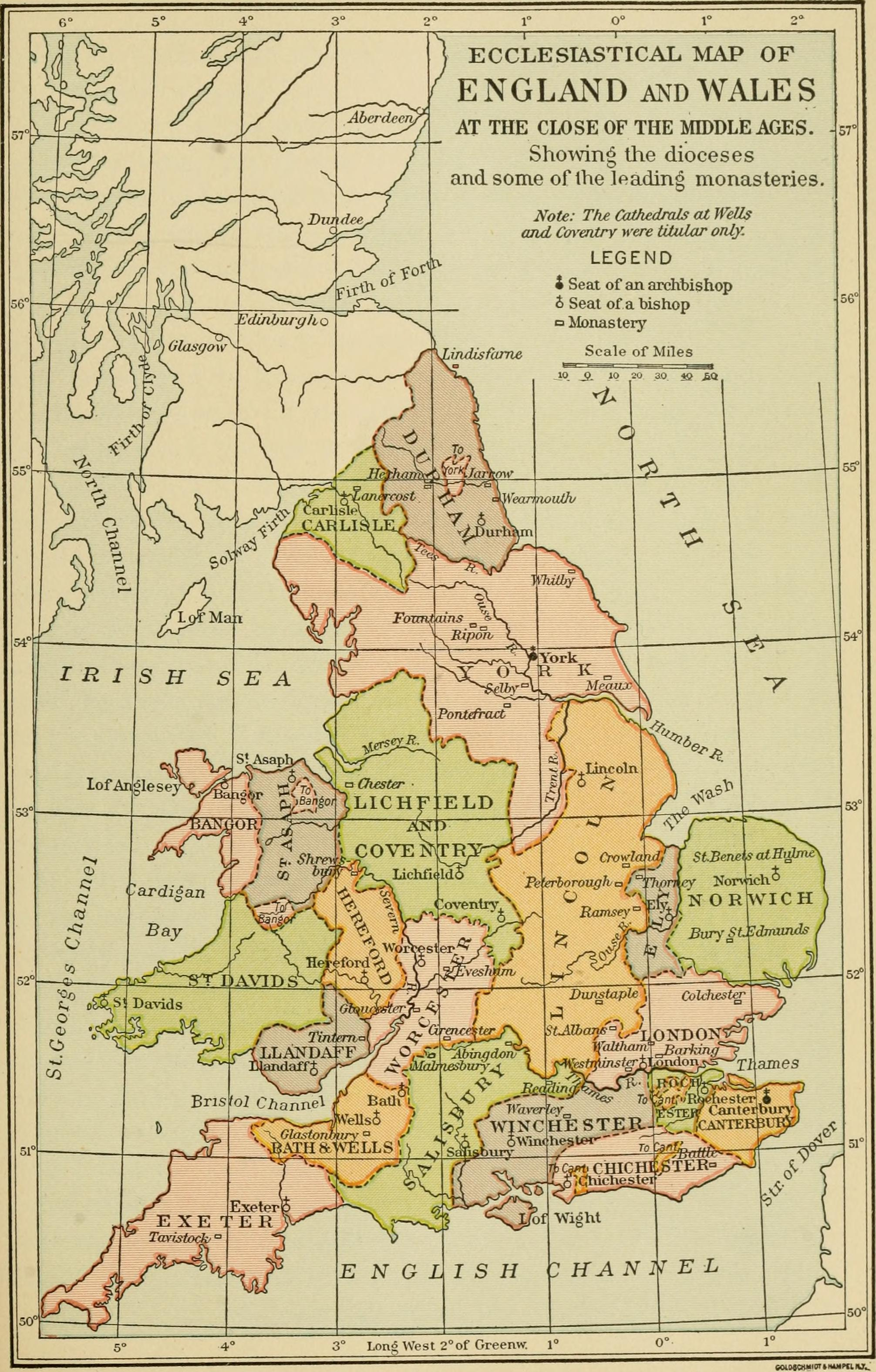
Dioceses of England and Wales prior to the Dissolution of the Monasteries (1536–1541)

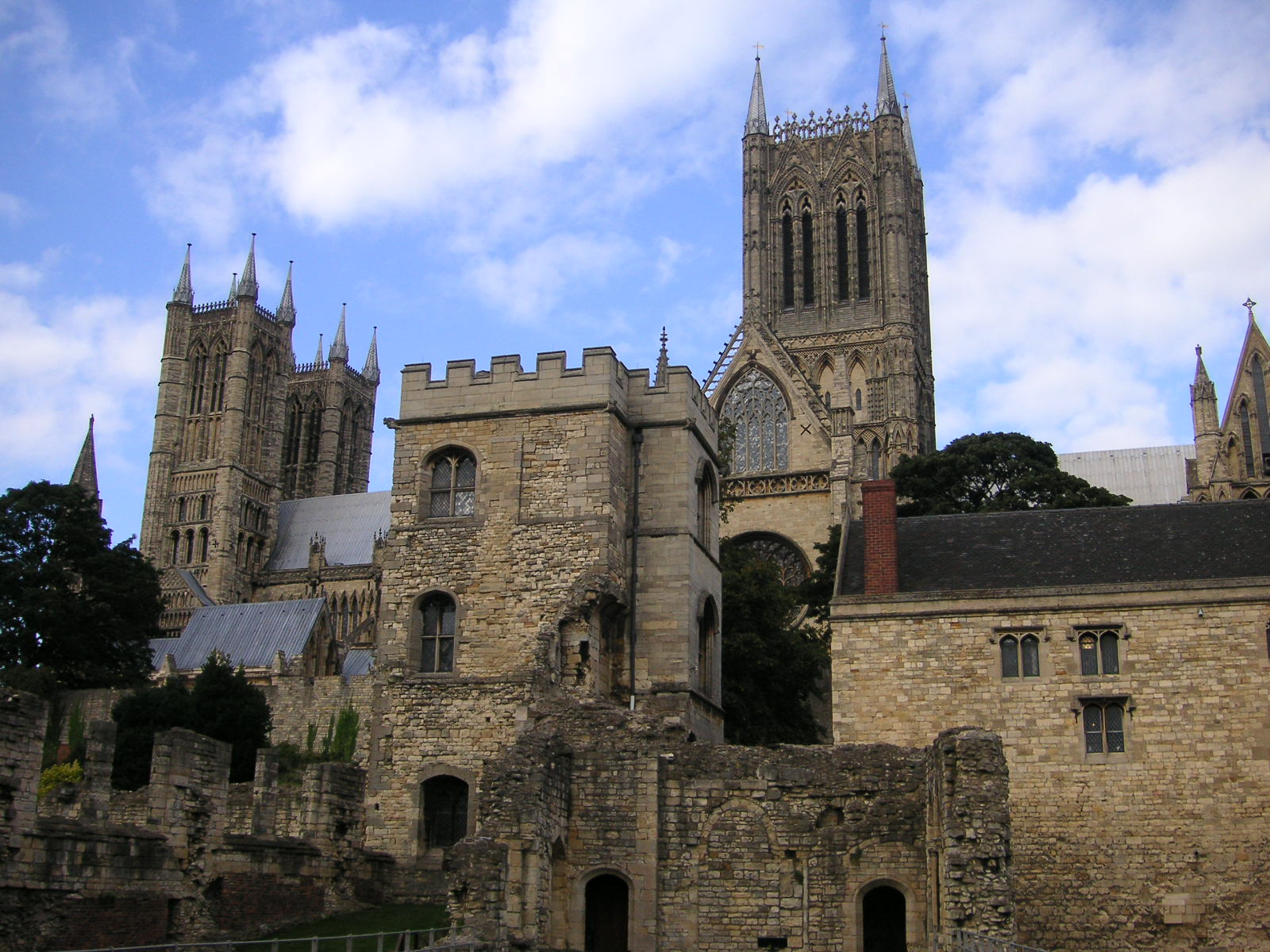
The ruins of the medieval Bishop's Palace at Lincoln, which was ruled by secular canons

Between 1075 and the 15th century, the cathedrals of England were almost evenly divided between those ruled by secular canons headed by a dean and those ruled by monastic orders headed by a prior, all of which were Benedictine, except Carlisle, which was Augustinian. Two cathedrals, Bath and Coventry, shared their sees with Wells and Lichfield, respectively.

=== Reformation ===
The entire structure of the monastic and cathedral system was overthrown and reconstituted during the Reformation. Cathedrals which were once Roman Catholic came under the governance of the Church of England.

All the English monastic cathedral chapters were dissolved by Henry VIII and, with the exceptions of Bath and Coventry, were re-founded by him as churches of secular chapters, with a dean as the head, and a certain number of canons ranging from twelve at Canterbury Cathedral and Durham Cathedral to four at Carlisle Cathedral, and with certain subordinate officers as minor canons, gospellers, epistolers, etc. The precentorship in these churches of the "New Foundation", as they are called, is not, as in the secular churches of the "Old Foundation", a dignity, but is merely an office held by one of the minor canons.

Henry VIII also created six new cathedrals from old monastic establishments, in each case governed by secular canons. Of these, Westminster did not retain its cathedral status. Four more of England's large historic churches were later to become cathedrals: Southwell, Southwark, Ripon, and St Albans Abbey.

== Details of cathedrals and their foundation ==
=== Ancient cathedrals ===
The medieval Church of England was organised into 16 dioceses. About half of the diocesan cathedrals were also monasteries, with the prior serving double duty as dean of the cathedral. The rest were served by a college of "secular" canons – non-monastic priests living under no fixed rule of life. Both types often had Saxon foundations. Dioceses which exist in the Church of England today are indicated in bold type.

==== Pre-Conquest ====
Diocese	Founded	Monastic or secular?	Notes
**Canterbury**	597	Monastic	Also called archbishop of Kent in Anglo-Saxon times.
**Rochester**	604	Monastic	Also called bishop of the West Kentish in Anglo-Saxon times.
**London**	604	Secular	Archbishops of London had existed previously; also called bishop of the East Saxons or of Essex in Anglo-Saxon times.
**York**	626	Secular	In Anglo-Saxon times also called bishop of Northumbria or of the Northumbrians, or of Deira.
East Anglia/Dunwich	631 (Dunwich or possibly Soham)	Monastic	Lapsed to Elmham in 950; also called bishop of the East Angles.
Dorchester/**Winchester**	634 (Dorchester, Oxon); 660 (Winchester)	Monastic	Also called bishop of Wessex in Anglo-Saxon times.
Lindisfarne/**Durham**	635 (Lindisfarne); 995 (Durham)	Monastic	Transferred to Durham in 995 from Chester-le-Street, itself a transfer from Lindisfarne; earlier called bishop of Bernicia or of the Bernicians.
Mercia/**Lichfield**	656 (Repton); 669 (Lichfield)	Monastic/Secular	After 1075, the see was occasionally Coventry or Chester; in Anglo-Saxon times called bishop of Mercia or of the Mercians.
Elmham/Thetford/**Norwich**	672 (Elmham); 1072 (Thetford); 1091 (Norwich)	Secular?/Monastic	
**Hereford**	676	Secular	Also called bishop of the Magonsæte in Anglo-Saxon times.
Lindsey (Sidnacester)	678	Secular	Merged with Dorchester, c. 1010; also called bishop of the Lindisfaras.
Ripon	678	Secular	One bishop only; merged to York before 700.
**Worcester**	680	Monastic	In Anglo-Saxon times also called bishop of the Hwicce.
Leicester/Dorchester/**Lincoln**	681 (Leicester); 878 (Dorchester); 1072 (Lincoln)	Unknown	
Selsey/**Chichester**	681 & 706 (Selsey); 1075 (Chichester)	Originally Monastic, from 1075 Secular	Selsey Abbey was founded in 681 and was the cathedra for the Kingdom of Sussex. That see lasted until 685, and from 686 to 705 was merged in the Diocese of Winchester, but was reasserted in 706. The bishopric was moved to Chichester by order of the Council of London in 1075; the bishops had previously also been known as bishop of Sussex or of the South Saxons.
Hexham	685	Monastic	Absorbed into Lindisfarne by 854.
**Sherborne**/**Salisbury**	705 (Sherborne); 1078 (Salisbury)	Originally Monastic, from 1078 Secular	
Cornish see (St Germans)	Mid-9th century	Monastic	United into Exeter, 1050.
Tawton/Crediton/**Exeter**	905 (Tawton); 909 (Crediton); 1050 (Exeter)	Secular	
**Bath and Wells**	909	Monastic/Secular	Bath was monastical and Wells a college of secular canons; from 909 to 1090 the seat was Wells, then from 1090 to 1245 Bath was usually the seat, and from 1245 the two places became joint seats albeit with Wells gaining pre-eminence; also called bishop of Somerset or bishop of the Somersaetas in Anglo-Saxon times.
Ramsbury	909	?	Reabsorbed into Sherborne, 1058.
(St) Teilo/Llandaff	Under English jurisdiction from c. 982 (Teilo); 1115 (Llandaff)	Monastic	Now a Church in Wales diocese.

==== Post-conquest ====
Diocese	Founded	Monastic or secular?	Notes
Bangor	Under English jurisdiction from c. 1081	Monastic	Now a Church in Wales diocese.
**Ely**	21 November 1108	Monastic	
St David's	Under English jurisdiction from c. 1115	Secular	Now a Church in Wales diocese.
**Carlisle**	1133	Monastic	
St Asaph	Under English jurisdiction from 1141	Monastic	Now a Church in Wales diocese.
**Sodor and Man**	Under English jurisdiction from c. 1400	?	

=== The Henrician Reorganisation ===
After Henry VIII's break with the Pope and the dissolution of the monasteries, the formerly monastic cathedrals were "re-founded" with secular canons. Furthermore, a number of new dioceses were formed, using some of the largest and finest of the other dissolved monasteries as cathedrals. Together, these two groups — the old monastic cathedrals and the new sees — were known as cathedrals of the New Foundation; the old cathedrals which had always been served by secular canons were known as those of the Old Foundation. Dioceses which exist in the Church of England today are indicated in bold type.

Diocese	Founded	Notes
Westminster	17 December 1540	Its cathedral was Westminster Abbey; but the diocese only existed 1540–50. From 1550–56, Westminster Abbey was a second cathedral, along with St Paul's, for the diocese of London. Since then the Abbey has not been a cathedral, but (since 1560) a royal peculiar, in which capacity (as a "neutral" non-diocesan Greater Church) the Archbishop of Canterbury (who lives on the other side of the Thames) still uses it for consecrations of bishops.
**Chester**	4 August 1541	St Werburgh's Abbey, an 11th-century Benedictine abbey was dissolved and made the new diocese's cathedral.
**Gloucester**	3 September 1541	St Peter's Abbey (another newly dissolved abbey) became the new diocese's cathedral. It had been in Benedictine hands since the 11th century. See dissolved and reunited to Worcester, 1552; and re-erected, 1554.
**Peterborough**	4 September 1541	The new cathedral had been a Benedictine abbey since the 10th century (St Peter's Abbey).
**Bristol**	4 June 1542	The 12th century Augustinian abbey (St Augustine's Abbey) was dissolved and became the new diocese's cathedral.
**Oxford**	1 September 1542	The cathedral was initially (and briefly) at Osney Abbey, a 12th-century Augustinian abbey. In 1545, the see was transferred to the chapel of Christ Church, Oxford University (which had formerly been part of the Augustinian St Frideswide's Priory)

=== Colonial dioceses ===
During the British colonial era, the Anglican religion was exported to the colonies. From 1787 onwards, Church of England dioceses were founded in the colonies. A structure of provinces and metropolitans developed until, in 1863, the imperial Privy Council ruled that the English church hierarchy had no legal status in the colonies. Immediately prior to that point, the United Church of England and Ireland had a total of 82 dioceses worldwide.

From 1863 onwards, Anglican (former) colonial dioceses have been separate from and independent of the English church. Exceptionally, the Archbishop of Canterbury has retained (and retains to this day) some metropolitan jurisdictions outside England. Dioceses are listed by their name at creation and their present country, with only their cathedral(s) between creation and independence.

Diocese	Year	Notes	Cathedral(s)
**Nova Scotia**, Canada	1787	First colonial diocese (founded 11 August 1787) – originally covered all British North America. Diocese of Nova Scotia and Prince Edward Island since 1999.	St Luke's Pro-Cathedral, Halifax
**Quebec**, Canada	1793	Created from Nova Scotia diocese.	Holy Trinity, Quebec City
**Calcutta**, India	1814	Jurisdiction originally included all of the Indian subcontinent and Australasia.	St. Paul's, Kolkata
**Barbados**	1824	Originally one of two Caribbean dioceses.	St Michael and All Angels, Bridgetown
**Jamaica**	1824	Originally one of two Caribbean dioceses. Now the West Indies Diocese of Jamaica and the Cayman Islands.	St. Jago de la Vega, Spanish Town
**Madras**, India	1835	Created from Calcutta diocese. At its creation, Calcutta gained metropolitan authority over all its former jurisdiction.	St. George's, Chennai
**Australia**	1836	Created from Calcutta diocese. Originally covered all of Australia and New Zealand, etc. Now the metropolitan Diocese of Sydney.	St Andrew's, Sydney
**Bombay**, India	1837	Created from Calcutta diocese. Now the CNI Diocese of Mumbai.	St. Thomas, Mumbai
**Newfoundland**, Canada	1839	Created from Nova Scotia diocese (Split in 1975/6 into Eastern Newfoundland and Labrador, Central Newfoundland and Western Newfoundland.	St. John the Baptist, St. John's
**Toronto**, Canada	1839	Split off from Nova Scotia diocese. Also called the Diocese of Upper Canada.	St. James, Toronto
**Jerusalem** (Note: Jerusalem's status is disputed and highly controversial. It is presently generally considered to be (wholly or partially) in the State of Israel (disputed with the State of Palestine), but has also been in the Ottoman Empire, the OETA, and Mandatory Palestine during the diocese's lifetime.)	1841	Originally covered all of the area of the current Episcopal Church in Jerusalem and the Middle East, of which it is now a diocese; and the Episcopal Church of Sudan.	—
**New Zealand**	1841	Originally covered the whole country. Now Auckland diocese.	old St Mary's, Parnell
**Antigua**	1842	Also called the diocese of Antigua and the Leeward Islands. Now the West Indies Diocese of the North East Caribbean and Aruba.	St. John the Divine, St. John's
**Guyana**	1842	Also called British Guiana.	old St. George's, Georgetown; Georgetown Pro-Cathedral
**Tasmania**	1842	Extraprovincial (subject to no metropolitan) from its creation to the present day.	—
**Colombo**, Ceylon	1845	Created from Madras diocese and originally subject to the metropolitan bishop of Calcutta. Now extraprovincial to the Archbishop of Canterbury.	—
**Fredericton**, Canada	1845	Created from Nova Scotia diocese.	Christ Church, Fredericton
**Adelaide**, Australia	1847	Created from the first split of the Diocese of Australia. Adelaide and Melbourne are now metropolitan archiepiscopal sees.	Holy Trinity Pro-Cathedral, Adelaide
**Melbourne**, Australia	1847	Created from the first split of the Diocese of Australia. Adelaide and Melbourne are now metropolitan archiepiscopal sees.	St James Old Cathedral, Melbourne
**Newcastle**, Australia	1847	Created from the first split of the Diocese of Australia. Adelaide and Melbourne are now metropolitan archiepiscopal sees.	old Christ Church, Newcastle
**Cape Town**, South Africa	1847	Now primate, metropolitan and sole archbishop of the Anglican Church of Southern Africa.	old St. George's, Cape Town
**Rupert's Land**, Canada	1849	Originally covered the area of the current Ecclesiastical Province of the Northern Lights.	St. John (II), Winnipeg
**Victoria**, Hong Kong	1849	Originally covered all South China and Hong Kong. First in Canterbury province, then in China, split in 1998 into the three dioceses of Hong Kong Sheng Kung Hui.	St. John's, Hong Kong
**Montreal**, Canada	1850	Created from Quebec diocese.	old Christ Church, Montreal
**Grahamstown**, South Africa	1853	Split from Cape Town diocese. Cape Town became the metropolitan see.	SS Michael & George, Grahamstown
**Natal**, South Africa	1853	Split from Cape Town diocese. Cape Town became the metropolitan see.	St Peter's, Pietermaritzburg
**Mauritius**	1854	Created from Colombo diocese.	St James's, Port Louis
**Labuan**, Malaysia	1855	Created from Calcutta diocese.	old St. Thomas, Kuching
**Christchurch**, New Zealand	1856	Created from the first split of the New Zealand diocese. That diocese became Auckland diocese and its bishop metropolitan over all New Zealand.	—
**Perth**, Australia	1856	Created from Adelaide diocese. Metropolitan archbishop over North West Australia since 1914.	old St George's, Perth
**Huron**, Canada	1857	Created from Toronto diocese.	St Paul's, London (Ontario)
**Brisbane**, Australia	1858	Created from the Australian Newcastle diocese. Metropolitan archbishop over Queensland since 1905.	old St John's Pro-Cathedral, Brisbane
**Nelson**, New Zealand	1858	Created from the New Zealand diocese.	old Christ Church, Nelson
**Waiapu**, New Zealand	1858	Created from the New Zealand diocese.	—
**Wellington**, New Zealand	1858	Created from the New Zealand diocese.	—
**British Columbia**, Canada	1859	Created from Rupert's Land diocese.	—
**St Helena**	1859	Created from Cape Town diocese. Now in the Anglican Church of Southern Africa.	St Paul's, Saint Helena
**Nassau**, Bahamas	1861	Created from the Diocese of Jamaica.	Christ Church, Nassau
**Ontario**, Canada	1862	Created from Toronto diocese.	St. George's, Kingston
**Goulburn**, Australia	1863	Created by letters patent from Queen Victoria on 14 March 1863, from Sydney diocese. Now the Diocese of Canberra and Goulburn.	—
**Grafton & Armidale**, Australia	1863	Created by letters patent from Queen Victoria in March 1863, from the Australian Newcastle diocese. Now the two dioceses of Armidale and of Grafton.	—

=== Irish dioceses ===
Between the 1801 Union and 1871 disestablishment, the Anglican dioceses of England and Ireland were united in one United Church of England and Ireland. As such, the Irish dioceses were, for a time, Church of England dioceses. Each diocese is listed with its cathedral(s) only during the United Church period.

Diocese	Province	Notes	Cathedral(s)
**Armagh**	Armagh	Metropolitan archbishop and Primate of All Ireland.	St Patrick's, Armagh
**Meath**	Armagh	Senior bishop after the archbishops.	St Patrick, Trim
**Derry**	Armagh	Derry and Raphoe since 1834.	St Columb's, Derry; St. Eunan, Raphoe
**Down & Connor**	Armagh	Down, Connor & Dromore 1842–1945, then split into Down & Dromore and Connor in 1945.	Holy and Undivided Trinity, Downpatrick; St Saviour, Connor & Christ Church, Lisburn; Christ the Redeemer, Dromore
Raphoe	Armagh	United to Derry since 1834.	St. Eunan, Raphoe
**Kilmore**	Armagh	Kilmore & Ardagh, 1839–1841; Kilmore, Elphin & Ardagh since 1841.	St Fethlimidh, Kilmore; St Mary's, Elphin
Dromore	Armagh	United to Down & Connor (1842–1945) then Down (since 1945).	Christ the Redeemer, Dromore
**Dublin and Glendalough**	Dublin	Metropolitan archbishop and Primate of Ireland; united with Kildare as Dublin, Kildare and Glendalough (1846–1976).	Christ Church & St Patrick's, Dublin; St Brigid, Kildare
Kildare	Dublin	Second most senior bishop after the archbishops. United with Dublin (1846–1976) and with Meath since.	St Brigid, Kildare
Ferns & Leighlin	Dublin	United since 1597; united to Ossory since 1835.	St Edan's, Ferns; St Laserian's, Old Leighlin
Ossory	Dublin	Ossory, Ferns & Leighlin (1835–1977); united to Cashel since.	St Canice's, Kilkenny; St Edan's, Ferns; St Laserian's, Old Leighlin
**Tuam and Ardagh**	Tuam (until 1839); Armagh (since 1839)	Metropolitan archbishop over Tuam province until its union to Armagh province in 1839. Diocese included Ardagh (nonetheless regarded as remaining in Armagh province) 1742–1839 and Killala & Achonry 1834–1839; Diocese of Tuam, Killala & Achonry since 1839.	St Mary's, Tuam; St Patrick's, Killala; St Crumnathy's, Achonry
**Clogher**	Tuam (until 1839); Armagh (since 1839)	United to the metropolitan diocese of Armagh (1850–1886).	St Macartan's, Clogher
Elphin	Tuam (until 1839); Armagh (since 1839)	United to Kilmore since 1841.	St Mary's, Elphin
Killala & Achonry	Tuam (until 1839); Armagh (since 1839)	United since 1622; united to Tuam since 1834.	St Patrick's, Killala; St Crumnathy's, Achonry
Clonfert & Kilmacduagh	Tuam (until 1834); Cashel (1834–1838); Dublin (since 1838)	United since 1627; united to Killaloe (since 1834) and to Limerick (since 1976).	St Brendan's, Clonfert; St Colman's, Kilmacduagh
**Cashel and Emly**	Cashel (until 1838); Dublin (since 1838)	Metropolitan archbishop of the province until its union to Dublin province in 1838. United with Waterford (since 1838) and with Ossory (since 1977).	St. John's, Cashel; St. Alibeus, Emly; Christ Church, Waterford; St Carthage's, Lismore
Cloyne	Cashel (until 1838); Dublin (since 1838)	United to Cork since 1835.	St Coleman's, Cloyne
**Cork & Ross**	Cashel (until 1838); Dublin (since 1838)	United since 1583; Cork, Cloyne & Ross since 1835.	old St Fin Barre's, Cork; St Coleman's, Cloyne; St. Fachtna, Rosscarbery
Killaloe & Kilfenora	Cashel (until 1838); Dublin (since 1838)	United since 1752; Killaloe & Clonfert (1834–1976); united to Limerick since 1976.	St Flannan's, Killaloe; St Brendan, Clonfert
**Limerick, Ardfert & Aghadoe**	Cashel (until 1838); Dublin (since 1838)	United since 1661; Limerick & Killaloe since 1976.	St Mary's, Limerick
Waterford & Lismore	Cashel (until 1838); Dublin (since 1838)	United since 1363; united to Cashel since 1838.	Christ Church Cathedral, Waterford; St Carthage's Cathedral, Lismore

=== Late modern foundations ===
No further cathedrals were founded until, in the mid 19th century, the huge population growth of north-central England meant that redistricting could no longer be ignored. Since then twenty new dioceses have been founded, each with a cathedral — some are great medieval monasteries or collegiate churches which were not elevated by Henry VIII but might well have been; others are glorified parish churches; and others are totally new constructions.

In the following table, bold type indicates the creation of a new diocese, whilst plain type is used to indicate changes to existing dioceses.

Diocese	Date	From	Cathedral History
Ripon	5 October 1836	Created from part of York and Chester; dissolved in creation of **Leeds** diocese	Great medieval collegiate church
Oxford	5 October 1836	took in Berkshire, from Salisbury	College chapel of Christ Church, Oxford
Bristol	5 October 1836	suppressed: Bristol went to Gloucester, Dorset went to Salisbury	
Lichfield	24 January 1837	Lichfield and Coventry became Lichfield; Coventry went to Worcester; Lichfield left with Derbyshire, Shropshire, Staffordshire	
Ely	May 1837	took in Bedfordshire and Huntingdonshire from Lincoln; part of Suffolk from Norwich	
Peterborough	1 May 1839	took in Leicestershire from Lincoln	
Lincoln	1 May 1839 & 8 June 1841	took in Nottinghamshire from York	
Oxford	12 November 1845	took in Buckinghamshire from Lincoln	
Rochester	1 January 1846	took in part of Hertfordshire from Lincoln and London	
Rochester	1 January 1846	took in Essex from London	
**Manchester**	1 November 1847	created from part of Chester	Great medieval collegiate church
Carlisle	1856	took in rest of Westmorland, Cumberland, Furness and Cartmel from Chester	
**Truro**	15 December 1876	created from part of Exeter	New cathedral (completed 1910), incorporating part of a parish church
**St Albans**	4 May 1877	created from part of Rochester	Great medieval monastery
**Liverpool**	9 April 1880	created from part of Chester	Parish church, initially; later a huge wholly new cathedral was built
**Newcastle**	23 May 1882	created from part of Durham	Parish church
**Southwell**	5 February 1884	created from part of Lincoln (Nottinghamshire) and Lichfield (Derbyshire)	Southwell Minster: a great medieval collegiate church
Wakefield	18 May 1888	created from part of Ripon; dissolved in creation of **Leeds** diocese	Parish church
**Bristol**	9 July 1897	reconstituted	previous cathedral
**Birmingham**	13 January 1905	created from part of Worcester	18th century parish church
**Southwark**	1 May 1905	created from parts of Rochester (and Winchester transferred in 1877 to Rochester)	Southwark Priory: Great medieval monastery
**Chelmsford**	23 January 1914	created from part of St Albans	Parish church
**St Edmundsbury and Ipswich**	23 January 1914	created from part of Ely and Norwich	Parish church, with remnants of adjoining medieval monastery visible
**Sheffield**	23 January 1914	created from part of York, small part of Southwell	Parish church
**Coventry**	6 September 1918	created from part of Worcester	Very large parish church (and sometime cathedral); after destruction in the second world war, a wholly new cathedral was built, adjoining and overlooking the ruins.
Bradford	25 November 1919	created from part of Ripon; dissolved in creation of **Leeds** diocese	Parish church
**Blackburn**	12 November 1926	created from part of Manchester	Parish church
**Leicester**	12 November 1926	created from part of Peterborough	Parish church
**Guildford**	1 May 1927	created from part of Winchester	New cathedral
**Portsmouth**	1 May 1927	created from part of Winchester	Parish church
**Derby**	7 July 1927	created from part of Southwell (Derbyshire)	Parish church
**Leeds**	20 April 2014	created following dissolution of Bradford, Ripon and Leeds and Wakefield	Three existing cathedrals

== Line of descent since St Augustine ==
There were archbishops in London, York and Caerleon and bishops in Lincoln before the 4th century. The following is a simplified breakdown of the creation of dioceses since St Augustine's 6th/7th century dioceses. It is simplified in that not every new diocese is formed from only one predecessor – they have often taken territory from two or more neighbouring dioceses. Today's dioceses are highlighted in bold type.

- **Canterbury** – 597–present
- **Rochester** – 604–present
  - Hertfordshire and Essex split off to form **Diocese of St Albans**, 1876–present
    - Essex split off to form **Diocese of Chelmsford**, 1914–present
- **London** – 604–present
  - seat at St Paul's 604–1539
    - split into Diocese of Westminster (seat at Westminster Abbey), 1540–50
  - seats at St Paul's and Westminster Abbey, 1550–56
  - seat at St Paul's, 1556–present
    - Hertfordshire and Essex moved to Rochester, 1846
- **York** – 625–present
  - Lindisfarne added (bishop of larger diocese also called "Bishop of Northumbria"), 664
  - larger diocese split in 678 to form:
    - **Diocese of York**
      - Archbishop, 735–present
      - split to create (with part of Lichfield-and-Coventry) the **Diocese of Chester**, 1541–present
        - Chester was Province of Canterbury until 1542; Province of York since
        - split to create (with part of York) new Diocese of Ripon, 1836–2014 (renamed Ripon and Leeds, 1999)
          - split to form Diocese of Wakefield, 1888–2014
          - split to form Diocese of Bradford, 1920–2014
        - **Diocese of Leeds**, created from former territory of dissolved dioceses of Ripon and Leeds, of Wakefield and of Bradford, 2014–present
        - split to form **Diocese of Manchester**, 1847–present
          - split to form **Diocese of Blackburn**, 1926–present
        - split to form **Diocese of Liverpool**, 1880–present
      - split to form **Diocese of Sheffield**, 1914–present
    - old Diocese of Ripon, 678 (reunited to York before 700)
    - Bernicia diocese (split 685)
      - Hexham diocese (two parts reabsorbed into York and Lindisfarne, 854)
      - Lindisfarne diocese (see below)
- East Anglia/**Norwich** – c. 630–present
  - "Bishop of the East Angles", c. 630–672
    - seat at Soham, c. 630 (purportedly, briefly before transfer to Dunwich)
    - seat at Dunwich, c. 630–672
  - split into Elmham/**Norwich diocese**, 672–present
    - seat at Elmham, 673–1070
    - seat at Thetford, 1070–1094
    - seat at Norwich, 1094–present
  - split to form Dunwich diocese, 672–c. 950
    - suppressed and reunited to Elmham, c. 950
- Dorchester (Wessex)/**Diocese of Winchester**, 634–present
  - seat at Dorchester-upon-Thames until c. 660–680
  - seat in flux c. 660–680
  - seat at Winchester since c. 660–680
  - split to form Selsey/**Chichester diocese**, 681–present
    - seat at Selsey, 681–685 & 706–1075
    - suppressed & absorbed by Winchester, 685–706
    - seat at Chichester since 1075
    - split off to form Sherborne/**Salisbury diocese**, 705–present
      - seat at Sherborne until 1075
      - seat at Old Sarum, 1075–1225
      - seat at New Sarum since 1225
      - split off to form Crediton/**Exeter diocese**, 905–present
        - seat at Tawton until c. 909
        - seat at Credition, c. 909–1050
        - seat at Exeter since 1050
        - absorbed Cornish see, 1027
        - split to form **Diocese of Truro**, 1876–present
      - split to form Ramsbury diocese, c. 909–1058
        - suppressed and reunited to Sherborne
      - split to form **the Somerset diocese**, c. 909–present
        - Diocese of Wells; seat at Wells, c. 909–1090
        - Diocese of Bath; seat at Bath, 1090–1197 & 1219–1245
        - Diocese of Bath and Glastonbury; seat at Glastonbury, 1197–1219
        - **Diocese of Bath and Wells**; equal seats at Bath and at Wells, 1245–1539
        - **Diocese of Bath and Wells**; seat at Wells, 1539–present
  - south London area given to Rochester, 1877–1905
    - similar area formed the **Diocese of Southwark**, 1905–present
  - split off to form **Diocese of Portsmouth**, 1927–present
  - split off to form **Diocese of Guildford**, 1927–present
- Lindisfarne/**Durham** – 635–present
  - seat at Lindisfarne, 635–664 & 685–875
  - united to York, 664–678
  - united to Bernicia, 678–685
  - seat at Chester-le-Street, 875–995
  - seat at Durham, 995–present
  - called Prince-Bishop, c. 1071–c. 1836
  - split to form **Diocese of Carlisle**, 1133–present
  - split to form **Diocese of Newcastle (upon Tyne)**, 1882–present
- **Lichfield** – 656–present
  - Mercian diocese; seat at Repton, 656–669
  - **Diocese of Lichfield**; seat at Lichfield, 669–1075 & 1837–present
  - Archbishop of Lichfield, metropolitan over Worcester, Leicester, Lindsey, Hereford, Elmham and Dunwich, 786–796 (seized from Canterbury)
  - Old Diocese of Chester; seat at Chester, 1075–1102
    - for new Diocese of Chester, see above
  - Old Diocese of Coventry; seat at Coventry, 1102–1228 (co-cathedral at Chester 1102–?)
    - for new Diocese of Coventry, see below
  - Diocese of Coventry and Lichfield; seats both at Coventry and at Lichfield, 1228–1539
  - Diocese of Lichfield and Coventry; seat at Lichfield, 1539–1837
  - split to form **Hereford diocese**, 676–present
  - split to form Lindsey diocese, 678–c. 1010
    - suppressed and given to the Dorchester (Mercian) diocese, c. 1010 (see below)
  - split to form **Worcester diocese**, 680–present
    - split to form **Gloucester diocese**, 1541–1552 & 1554–present
      - Diocese of Gloucester; seat at Gloucester, 1541–1552, 1554–1836 & 1897–present
      - Diocese of Worcester and Gloucester; seats both at Worcester and at Gloucester, 1552–1554
      - Diocese of Gloucester and Bristol; seats both at Gloucester and at Bristol, 1836–1897
      - split to form **Bristol diocese**, 1542–present
        - suppressed and merged to Gloucester diocese, 1836–1897
    - split to form **Birmingham diocese**, 1905–present
    - split to form new **Coventry diocese**, 1918–present
  - split to form old Leicester/Dorchester (Mercian)/**Lincoln diocese**, 681–present
    - seat at Leicester, 681–878
    - seat at Dorchester-upon-Thames, 878–1072
    - seat at Lincoln, 1072–present
    - split to form **Ely diocese**, 1108–present
      - split to form the **Diocese of St Edmundsbury and Ipswich**, 1914–present
    - split to form **Peterborough diocese**, 1541–present
      - split to form new **Leicester diocese**, 1926–present
    - split to form **Oxford diocese**, 1542–present
      - seat at Osney, 1542
      - seat at Christ Church, 1542–present
  - some territory ceded to Worcester, 1837; some of which became Birmingham and Coventry dioceses, 1905 & 1918 (see above)
  - split to form Southwell diocese, 1884–present
    - Province of Canterbury until 1936; Province of York since
    - called **Southwell and Nottingham** since 2005
    - split to form **Derby diocese**, 1927–present
- Old Cornish bishopric – c. 920–1027
  - See at St Germans
  - Called "Bishop of Cornwall" and "Bishop of St Germans"
  - Absorbed by Crediton (see above)
- Glamorgan area – c522–present (Wales)
  - Bishop of (St) Teilo until before 1107
  - Under Canterbury's jurisdiction by 982
  - Bishop of Glamorgan (and Gwent), before 1107–1115
  - Diocese of Llandaff; Bishop of Llandaff; seat at Llandaff, 1115–present
  - Church in Wales since 1920
- Bangor diocese – 546–present (Wales)
  - Under Canterbury's jurisdiction by c. 1081
  - Church in Wales since 1920
- St David's diocese – 545–present (Wales)
  - Archbishop of St David's until 1115
  - Under Canterbury's jurisdiction by 1115
  - Church in Wales since 1920
- St Asaph diocese – c. 583–present (Wales)
  - Under Canterbury's jurisdiction by 1143
  - Church in Wales since 1920
- **Sodor and Man diocese** received from Norwegian jurisdiction – c. 1400–present
  - Province of Canterbury until 1542; Province of York since
- **Europe diocese**, 1842–present
  - Diocese of Gibraltar (over southern Europe), founded 1842
  - merged with London's continental jurisdictions (over northern and central Europe) and renamed **Diocese of Gibraltar in Europe**, 1980

== See also ==
- Apostolicae curae
- Monasticism
- Architecture of the medieval cathedrals of England
- List of cathedrals in the United Kingdom
- Anglican Communion
- List of Church of England dioceses
- Gesta pontificum Anglorum
