= David John Lee =

David John Lee may refer to:

- David Lee (archdeacon of Bradford)
- David Lee (footballer, born 1969)

== See also ==
- David Lee (disambiguation)
