= Sidney Lowe (priest) =

Archdeacon of Bradford (1882–1968)

The Venerable Sidney Lowe FRSA

Archdeacon of Bradford
- In office 1934–1953

Personal details
- Born: 22 March 1882
- Died: 10 January 1968 (aged 85)
- Spouse: Olive Nelson Tomlinson

The Venerable Sidney Edward Lowe (22 March 1882 – 10 January 1968) was Archdeacon of Bradford from 1934 to 1953.

Lowe was educated at King Edward's School, Birmingham and the University of Birmingham and ordained in 1905. After a curacy at St James’, Gorton he held incumbencies at Holy Trinity, Colne St Peter's, Rochdale, All Saints’, Bradford, All Saints Otley and St Oswald's Guiseley before his years as an Archdeacon.

== Notes ==
Church of England titles
Preceded by Frederick George Ackerley	Archdeacon of Bradford; 1934–1953	Succeeded by Kenneth Kay
