= David Lee =

David Lee may refer to:

== Arts ==
- David Lee (art critic) (born 1953), editor of Jackdaw magazine
- David Lee (Australian sound engineer) (born 1958)
- David Lee (Canadian sound engineer) (1938–2008)
- David Lee (drummer) (1941–2021), American jazz drummer
- David Lee (organist) (1837–1897) in Melbourne, Australia
- David Lee (poet) (born 1944), American poet
- David Lee (photographer) (born 1982), American photographer and film director
- David Lee (screenwriter) (born 1950), American television writer, producer and director, notably of Frasier
- David Lee (still photographer) (born 1961)
- David Lee (visual effects artist), New Zealand visual effects artist
- David Dodd Lee (born 1959), American poet
- David M. Lee (stereophotographer) (1950–2015)
- David U. Lee, Chinese-American Hollywood film producer and entrepreneur
- M. David Lee III (born 1965), American film director and producer

== Business ==
- David Lee (investor), American angel investor
- David Lee (real estate developer) (born c. 1955), American head of Jamison Properties
- David L. Lee (born 1949), Taiwanese-American managing general partner of Clarity Partners
- David S. Lee (born c. 1938), American CEO of eOn Communications Corporation

== Sports ==
=== Basketball ===
- David Lee (basketball) (born 1983), American retired NBA basketball player
- Dave Lee (basketball) (David G. Lee, born 1942), American basketball player in the American Basketball Association

=== Football ===
- David Lee (American football coach) (born 1953), American football coach and former player
- David Lee (Canadian football) (born 1990), Canadian football defensive end
- David Lee (footballer, born 1967), English footballer who played mostly with Bury FC and Bolton Wanderers FC
- David Lee (footballer, born 1969), English footballer who played mostly with Chelsea FC
- David Lee (footballer, born 1980), English footballer who played mostly with Southend United FC and Hull City AFC
- David Lee (punter) (1943–2026), American Baltimore Colts punter (American football)
- David Lee (Singaporean footballer) (born 1958), Singaporean football player

=== Other sports ===
- David Lee (athlete) (born 1959), American former hurdler
- David Lee (baseball) (born 1973), American Major League Baseball player (1999–2004)
- David Lee (sport shooter) (born 1948), Canadian sports shooter
- David Lee (volleyball) (born 1982), American Olympic volleyball player

== Politics ==
- David Lee (Australian politician), member of the Parliament of Queensland
- David Lee (Taiwanese politician) (born 1949), Republic of China politician
- David Lee (Trinidad and Tobago politician), Trinidad MP

== Religion ==
- David Lee (archdeacon of Bradford) (born 1946), Anglican Archdeacon of Bradford
- David Lee (archdeacon of Llandaff) (born 1930)

== Other ==
- David Lee, a fictional character in the television series The Good Wife and The Good Fight
- David Lee (physicist) (born 1931), American Nobel Prize-winning physicist
- David Lee (RAF officer) (1912–2004)
- David Lee (economist), economist and former provost of Princeton University

== See also ==
- Dave Lee (disambiguation)
- David Leigh (disambiguation)
- David Li (disambiguation)
- David Lea, Baron Lea of Crondall (born 1937), British Labour politician
- David Lee Murphy (born 1959), American singer
- Lee David (born 1994), South Korean actor
