= Bishop of Bradford (diocese) =

Anglican diocesan bishop in England

The Bishop of Bradford was, until 20 April 2014, the ordinary of the Diocese of Bradford, which covered the extreme west of Yorkshire and was centred in the city of Bradford where the bishop's seat (cathedra) is located in the Cathedral Church of Saint Peter. The bishop's residence was "Bishopscroft" in Bradford. The office existed since the foundation of the see from part of the Diocese of Ripon in 1920 under George V. The last diocesan Bishop of Bradford was Nick Baines, from 21 May 2011 until 20 April 2014. Baines was on sabbatical from February 2014 until the dissolution of the diocese on Easter Day 2014, during which time retired bishop Tom Butler was acting diocesan Bishop of Bradford.

== List of bishops ==
Bishops of Bradford
From	Until	Incumbent	Notes
1920	1931	Arthur Perowne	Nominated on 8 January and consecrated on 2 February 1920. Translated to Worcester on 11 March 1931.
1931	1955	Alfred Blunt	Nominated on 15 July and consecrated on 25 July 1931, Resigned on 31 October 1955 and died on 2 June 1957.
1956	1961	Donald Coggan	Nominated on 6 December 1955 and consecrated on 25 January 1956. Translated to York on 6 July 1961, then to Canterbury on 5 December 1974.
1961	1971	Michael Parker	Translated from Aston. Nominated on 19 September and confirmed on 29 September 1961. Resigned on 30 November 1971 and died on 5 March 1980.
1972	1980	Ross Hook	Translated from Grantham. Nominated on 28 April and confirmed on 25 May 1972. Resigned on 30 September 1980, becoming Chief of Staff to the Archbishop of Canterbury until 1984, and died on 26 June 1996.
1981	1983	Geoffrey Paul	Translated from Hull. Nominated on 9 February and confirmed on 20 March 1981. Died in office on 10 July 1983.
1984	1991	Robert Williamson	Nominated on 9 February and consecrated on 20 March 1984. Translated to Southwark in 1991.
1992	2002	David Smith	Previously Bishop of Maidstone and to the Forces. Nominated and confirmed in 1992. Resigned on 31 July 2002.
2002	2010	David James	Translated from Pontefract. Nominated on 9 July 2002, and confirmed at York Minster in November 2002. Retired on 14 July 2010.
2011	20 April 2014	Nick Baines	Translated from Croydon; installed on 21 May 2011; later Bishop of Leeds, since June 2014 until retirement in November 2025.
February 2014	20 April 2014	Tom Butler (Acting)	Acting bishop during Baines' sabbatical; became Acting area Bishop of Bradford

== Assistant bishops ==
Among those who have served as assistant bishops in the diocese were:

- 1935–1949: Rupert Mounsey CR, Canon of Bradford (from 1937) and former Bishop of Labuan and Sarawak (1909–1916) and Assistant in Wakefield (1924) and in Truro (1925–1935)
- 1948 – 1957 (ret.): Alec Hardy, Vicar of Gargrave and former Bishop in Nagpur
- 1988 – 1993 (res.): David Evans, Gen. Sec. of SAMS and former Bishop in Peru — acting diocesan bishop, 1991–1992
- 1998 – 2001 (ret.): Peter Vaughan, house-for-duty assistant bishop and retired Bishop suffragan of Ramsbury
- 2002 – 2008 (d.): Ian Harland, honorary assistant bishop, retired Bishop of Carlisle
- 2005 – 2014 (formation of Leeds dio.): David Hope, Hon. Priest-in-Charge, Ilkley (St Margaret's) until 2006, and former Archbishop of York
