= Toby Howarth =

British Anglican bishop

The Right Reverend Toby Howarth
- Bishop of Bradford
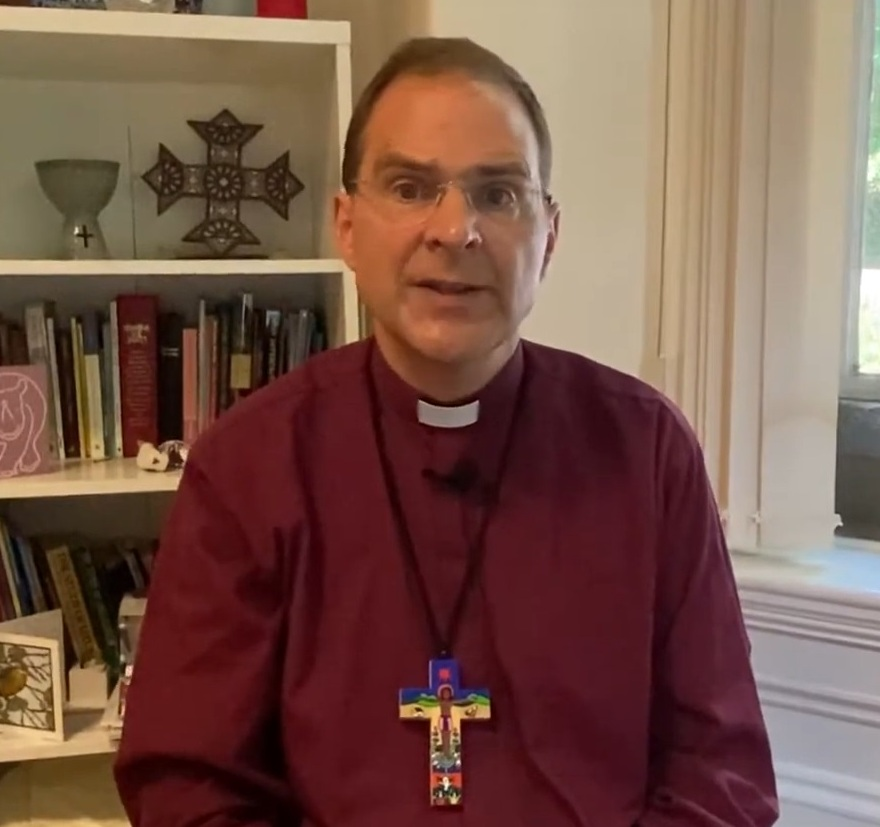
- Bishop Howarth in 2020
- Church: Church of England
- Diocese: Diocese of Leeds
- In office: 2014 to present
- Other post: Bishop-designate of Leeds (2026)

Orders
- Ordination: 1992 (deacon); 1993 (priest)
- Consecration: 17 October 2014 by John Sentamu

Personal details
- Born: 12 July 1962 (age 64)
- Denomination: Anglicanism
- Education: Yale University; Wycliffe Hall, Oxford; University of Birmingham; Free University of Amsterdam

Toby Matthew Howarth (born 12 July 1962) is a Church of England bishop. Since 2014, he has been the Bishop of Bradford, a suffragan bishop in the Diocese of Leeds. In July 2026, it was announced that he would be the next Bishop of Leeds, having acted as acting diocesan bishop during the episcopal vacancy.

== Early life and education ==
Howarth was born on 12 July 1962 in Kenya. He was educated at Haverstock School, a comprehensive school in Haverstock, London. He studied at Yale University, graduating with a Bachelor of Arts (BA) degree in 1986. After returning to the UK, he worked for two years as research assistant to John Stott, a prominent conservative evangelical Anglican minister.

In 1989, he entered Wycliffe Hall, Oxford, an evangelical Anglican theological college to train for ordination. During this time he also a postgraduate student at the University of Birmingham, completing a Master of Arts (MA) degree in Islamic studies in 1991. Following ordination, he continued his studies and undertook research in India on Islamic preaching for a Doctor of Philosophy (PhD) degree with Free University of Amsterdam; he completed his PhD in 2001. His doctoral thesis was titled "The pulpit of tears: Shî'î Muslim preaching in India".

== Ordained ministry ==
Howarth was made deacon on Michaelmas (27 September) 1992, at Derby Cathedral, by Peter Dawes, Bishop of Derby. He was then ordained in the Church of England as a priest the following year. His first post was a curacy at St Augustine's Church, Derby, in the Diocese of Derby, from 1992 to 1995. Then, from 1995 to 2000, he was in India with Crosslinks, an evangelical Anglican missionary society. He was also a research student at the Henry Martyn Centre for Reconciliation and Interfaith Relations in Hyderabad, India. He was then an evangelist at the Pilgrim Fathers Church, Rotterdam, Netherlands, from 2000 to 2002.

In 2002, Howarth was appointed vice principal and tutor at Crowther Hall, Selly Oak, a Church Mission Society training college. He also held permission to officiate and then licence to officiate in the Diocese of Birmingham during this time. In 2004, he returned to parish ministry in the Church of England as priest in charge at St Christopher's Church, Springfield. From 2005, he was also the Bishop of Birmingham's advisor on interfaith relations. He was then the Archbishop of Canterbury's secretary for international relations from April 2011 until his elevation to the episcopate.

=== Episcopal ministry ===
On 26 August 2014, he was announced as the next Bishop of Bradford, a suffragan and area bishop in the Diocese of Leeds. He was consecrated as a bishop on 17 October 2014 during a service at York Minster. He became acting Bishop of Leeds on 1 December 2025, following the retirement of Nick Baines.

On 31 July 2026, it was announced that he would transition from his suffragan see to become Bishop of Leeds, the diocesan bishop of the Diocese of Leeds.

== Personal life ==
In 1994, Howarth married Henriette. She is also ordained in the Church of England. Together they have three children.

== Selected works ==
- Howarth, Toby M. (2005). The Twelver Shîʿa as a Muslim minority in India: pulpit of tears. London: Routledge. ISBN 978-0415362344.
