= Smitha Prasadam =

British Anglican priest

The Right Reverend Smitha Prasadam
- Bishop of Huddersfield
- Church: Church of England
- Province: Province of York
- Diocese: Anglican Diocese of Leeds
- In office: 2023–present
- Predecessor: Jonathan Gibbs
- Other post(s): Chaplain, St. Alban's Church, Copenhagen (2018–2023)

Orders
- Ordination: 2003 (deacon); 2004 (priest) by John Sentamu
- Consecration: 22 June 2023 by Stephen Cottrell

Personal details
- Born: South India
- Spouse: Peter Prasadam
- Children: 1
- Education: The Queen's Foundation

Madhu Smitha Prasadam (born 1964) is an Anglican bishop. Since 2023 she has served as Bishop of Huddersfield in the Diocese of Leeds. From 2018 to 2023, she served as Chaplain of St. Alban's Church, Copenhagen.

== Early life ==
Prasadam was born in South India in 1964. Her parents worked for the Church Mission Society. They moved to Wales; and her mother became the first Indian woman ordained in the UK.

== Ordained ministry ==
She trained for ordained ministry at The Queen's Foundation. After a curacy at Blackheath in the West Midlands, she became vicar of St Paul's Church, Hamstead in 2007. In 2018 she moved to Denmark to be Anglican Chaplain in Copenhagen. She was also the Bishop in Europe's racial justice adviser, vocations adviser and chair of the House of Clergy. She is a member of the College Council of St John's College, Durham.

On 8 March 2023, Prasadam was announced as the next Bishop of Huddersfield, an area bishop in the Anglican Diocese of Leeds. On 22 June 2023, she was consecrated a bishop by Stephen Cottrell, Archbishop of York, during a service at York Minster.

=== Views ===
In November 2023, she was one of 44 Church of England bishops who signed an open letter supporting the use of the Prayers of Love and Faith (i.e. blessings for same-sex couples) and called for "Guidance being issued without delay that includes the removal of all restrictions on clergy entering same-sex civil marriages, and on bishops ordaining and licensing such clergy".

== Personal life ==
Prasadam is married to Peter Prasadam: they have one daughter, Esther.

Church of England titles
Preceded by Jonathan Gibbs	Bishop of Huddersfield; 2023 to present	Incumbent
