= David Shreeve (priest) =

English priest (1934–2021)

David Herbert Shreeve (18 January 1934 – 4 December 2021) was Archdeacon of Bradford from 1984 until 1999.

Shreeve was educated at Southfield Grammar School and St Peter's College, Oxford, and trained for ordination at Ridley Hall, Cambridge. He was ordained deacon in 1959 and priest in 1960, and began his ministry with a curacy at St Andrew's, Plymouth. Following this he was Vicar of St Anne's, Bermondsey, and then Vicar of St Luke's, Eccleshill and Rural Dean of Calverley until his appointment to the senior leadership team of the Diocese of Bradford.

He died in 2021.

== Notes ==
Church of England titles
| Preceded by Frank Pilkington Sargeant | Archdeacon of Bradford; 1984 –1989 | Succeeded by Guy Alexander Wilkinson |
