= Bishop of Leeds =

Bishop of Leeds may refer to:

- Anglican Bishop of Leeds, the ordinary of the Church of England Diocese of Leeds
- Roman Catholic Bishop of Leeds, the ordinary of the Roman Catholic Diocese of Leeds
