= Bishop of Bradford =

English anglican bishop sufra

The Bishop of Bradford is an episcopal title used by a suffragan bishop of the Church of England Diocese of Leeds, in the Province of York, England. The title takes its name after Bradford, a city in West Yorkshire.

Upon the creation of the Diocese of Leeds on 20 April 2014, the diocesan see was dissolved and its diocese's territory added to the new diocese, within which there is a newly created suffragan see for the Area Bishop of Bradford. On 26 August 2014, it was announced that Toby Howarth was to become the first area bishop of Bradford; he was consecrated on 17 October 2014.

== List of bishops ==
Bishops of Bradford
April 2014	1 December 2014	Tom Butler (Acting)	Acting bishop between diocese's erection and Howarth taking up the post.
17 October 2014	6 November 2026	Toby Howarth	Translated to Leeds
