= Jonathan Gibbs (bishop) =

Bishop of Rochester

The Right Reverend Dr Jonathan Gibbs
- Bishop of Rochester
- Church: Church of England
- Province: Canterbury
- Diocese: Diocese of Rochester
- In office: 2022–present
- Predecessor: James Langstaff
- Other post: Area Bishop of Huddersfield (2014–2022)

Orders
- Ordination: 1989 (deacon); 1990 (priest)
- Consecration: 17 October 2014 by Archbishop John Sentamu

Personal details
- Born: Jonathan Robert Gibbs; 6 May 1961 (age 65)
- Denomination: Anglicanism
- Parents: Phillip Gibbs
- Spouse: Toni née Millsted
- Children: 3
- Education: The King's School, Chester
- Alma mater: Jesus College, Oxford; Ridley Hall, Cambridge; Jesus College, Cambridge

Jonathan Robert Gibbs (born 6 May 1961) is a Church of England bishop. He is the current Bishop of Rochester, the diocesan bishop for the Diocese of Rochester. He served as the first Bishop of Huddersfield between 2014 and 2022.

== Early life and education ==
Born in 1961, Gibbs was educated at King's School Chester, a private school in Cheshire. He then read Philosophy and Politics at Jesus College, Oxford, graduating as Bachelor of Arts (BA) before proceeding, as is customary, MA (Oxon).

In 1984, Gibbs entered Ridley Hall, Cambridge, an Anglican theological college, to train for ordained ministry. He also pursued postgraduate research at Jesus College, Cambridge, taking a doctorate of Philosophy (PhD) in 1990. His doctoral thesis was titled "The challenge of transformation: towards a theology of work in the light of the thought of the Revd Dr Richard Niebuhr".

== Ordained ministry ==
Gibbs was ordained in the Church of England as a deacon in 1989 then as a priest in 1990. He served his curacy at Holy Trinity and Christ Church, Stalybridge in the diocese of Chester. He was the Intercontinental Church Society Chaplain at Basel (Switzerland) and Freiburg-im-Breisgau (Germany) from 1992 until 1998. He was then the incumbent at Heswall on the Wirral from 1998 until his elevation to the episcopate in 2014.

=== Episcopal ministry ===
In August 2014, it was announced that Gibbs would be the first Bishop of Huddersfield, an area bishop in the newly created diocese of Leeds. On 17 October 2014, he was consecrated a bishop by Dr John Sentamu, Archbishop of York, during a service at York Minster.

On 31 March 2022, it was announced that Gibbs would succeed James Langstaff as diocesan bishop for the see of Rochester. He took up the See on 24 May 2022 (at St Mary-le-Bow) upon the confirmation of his election and was afterwards installed as Bishop of Rochester during a service at Rochester Cathedral on 24 September 2022.

=== Views ===
In 2023, following the news that the House of Bishops of the Church of England was to introduce proposals for blessing same-sex relationships, he signed an open letter, stating:

many Christians in the Church of England and the Anglican Communion, together with Christians from across the churches of world Christianity, continue to believe that marriage is given by God for the union of a man and woman and that it cannot be extended to those who are of the same sex. [...] Without seeking to diminish the value of many committed same-sex relationships, for which there is much to give thanks, we find ourselves constrained by what we sincerely believe the Scriptures teach which cannot be set aside.

Bishop Gibbs voted against introducing "standalone services for same-sex couples" on a trial basis during a meeting of the General Synod in November 2023; the motion passed.

== Personal life ==
Gibbs married Toni Millsted in 1986. Together, they have three children: Harriet, Edward and Thomas.

== See also ==
- Danbury Palace
- Anglican Diocese of Rochester
- Rochester Cathedral

Church of England titles
Preceded by Office created	Bishop of Huddersfield; 2014–2022	Succeeded by Smitha Prasadam
Preceded by James Langstaff	Bishop of Rochester; 2022–present	Succeeded by in office
