= Kenneth Kay =

The Venerable Kenneth Kay BA MA

Archdeacon of Bradford
- In office 1953–1957

Personal details
- Born: 1902
- Died: 30 August 1958 (aged 55–56)
- Spouse: Blanche Jones

The Venerable Kenneth Kay (1902–1958) was Archdeacon of Bradford, England, from 1953 to 1957.

Kay was educated at the Chorister School, Durham and the city's university and ordained in 1926. After a curacy at Herrington he became Chaplain of St Oswald, Lahore. Following this he was a Naval Chaplain serving on HMS Curacoa from 1931 to 1933 when he became Vicar of Queensbury (during World War II he returned to military service with the RNVR). In 1945 he became Vicar of Heaton and in 1948 an Honorary Canon of Bradford Cathedral.

Church of England titles
| Preceded by Sidney Edward Lowe | Archdeacon of Bradford; 1953–1957 | Succeeded by Hubert Laurence Higgs |
