= Guy Wilkinson (priest) =

The Venerable Canon Guy Alexander Wilkinson CBE MA

Archdeacon of Bradford
- In office 1999–2004

Personal details
- Spouse: Tessa Osbourn

The Venerable Canon Guy Alexander Wilkinson CBE (born 13 January 1948) is an Anglican priest who was Archdeacon of Bradford from 1999 to 2004.

Wilkinson was educated at Magdalene College, Cambridge and ordained after an earlier career with the EU in 1987. After a curacy at Wyken he became Rector of Ockham, Surrey and Domestic Chaplain to the Bishop of Guildford from 1990 to 1994. After this he was Vicar of Small Heath, Birmingham until his appointment to the Diocese of Bradford’s senior leadership team as Archdeacon of Bradford. He moved from Bradford in 2004 to take up the post of Inter Religious Affairs Adviser to the Archbishop of Canterbury. He retired from that post in 2010 to become vicar of St Andrew's, Fulham Fields and Area Dean of Hammersmith and Fulham. He was co-chair of the Faiths Forum for London until 2013; Company Secretary to Near Neighbours; and adviser to the European Council of Religious Leaders

2012- : Vicar, St. Andrew's Church, Fulham Fields, London. 2012- : Area Dean, Hammersmith and Fulham, London.

Awarded C.B.E. in New Year's Honours List 2012.

== Notes ==
Church of England titles
Preceded by David Herbert Shreeve	Archdeacon of Bradford; 1999–2004	Succeeded by David John Lee
