= David Leigh =

David Leigh may refer to:

- David Leigh (journalist) (born 1946), British journalist and writer
- David Leigh (swimmer) (born 1956), British former swimmer
- David Leigh (scientist) (born 1963), professor of organic chemistry

== See also ==
- David Lee (disambiguation)
