= Dave Lee =

Dave Lee may refer to:

- Dave Lee (basketball) (born 1942), American basketball player
- Dave Lee (comedian) (1947–2012), British comedian
- Dave Lee (darts player) (born 1956), English former darts player
- Dave Lee (DJ) (born 1964), British DJ, producer, and remixer often better known as Joey Negro
- Dave Lee (horn player), British horn and Wagner tuba player associated with the Michael Nyman Band
- Dave Lee (jazz musician) (born 1926), jazz pianist and orchestra leader

== See also ==
- David Lee (disambiguation)
