= Andy Jolley =

Priest and senior member of the clergy

Andrew John Jolley (b Nottingham 21 March 1961) has been Archdeacon of Bradford in the Church of England Diocese of Leeds since 2016.

Jolley was educated at Loughborough Grammar School, the University of Nottingham and Warwick University. A former management consultant, he was ordained after a period of study at St John's College, Nottingham in 1999. After a curacy in Sparkhill he was Vicar of Aston and Nechells from 2002 until his appointment as archdeacon.

== Notes ==
Church of England titles
Preceded by David Lee	Archdeacon of Bradford; 2015–	Succeeded by Incumbent
