= David Li (disambiguation) =

David Li (born 1939) is a Hong Kong banker and politician.

David Li may also refer to:

- David H. Li (1928–?), Chinese professor and author of books on the culture of China
- David Daokui Li (born 1963), Chinese economist
- David X. Li (born in 1960s), Chinese quantitative analyst and qualified actuary

== See also ==
- David Lee (disambiguation)
- Li (surname)
