= David M. Lee (stereophotographer) =

David M. Lee (February 4, 1950 – January 28, 2015) was an American stereophotographer, inventor and psychologist.

== Career ==
Raised in Modesto, California, David began taking stereo photos in 1983. Lee began his career in three dimensional stereo photography in 1985. David returned to Modesto, several years after graduating from the University of California at Berkeley, where he taught photography at Modesto Junior College from 1985-1995.

Lee invented the Hyper-View Large Format Stereo Print Viewer in 1990, improving on a viewer previously used for reviewing stereo medical X-rays and aerial stereo viewers. Both aerial stereo viewers and X-ray stereo viewers are similar in concept. The difference between the Hyper-View Large Format Stereo Viewer and the other two mentioned is that the others cannot cover a very large field of view. The Hyper-View device essentially widens the effective separation of the viewer's eyes from about 2½ inches to about 11 inches, as through two horizontal periscopes. One of the most convenient models is called the 3D Scope. Other viewers include the Wheatstone Mini-Scope and the Adjustable 3D Prism Glasses. After building several viewers, Lee subsequently provided design specifications to Steven Berezin, of Berezin Stereo Products, a manufacturer which produces the oversized hyperviewers for sale to galleries and individual customers. Berezin has a viewer selection chart to help you decide which viewer is right for you. One of the main uses for which Lee envisioned was for gallery exhibitions of his own stereo prints. Lee was also interested in encouraging other "fine art" photographers who had never seriously considered stereo photography to begin producing creative work in this medium.

Having enjoyed hiking, backpacking, and photographing in Yosemite National Park and the nearby Sierra Nevada Mountains for over 40 years, David M. Lee was the artist in residence at Yosemite National Park in 2000. Many of his photographs focused on landscapes at Yosemite National Park, including a shot of Half Dome from Mirror Lake in April 2000, which has been called “the best stereo photograph ever.” According to stereograph gallery owner Craig Goldwyn, Lee produced “ethereal stereocards of landscapes … in the tradition of Ansel Adams.” Travelling far and wide, subjects of these stereo photo landscapes include: Bodie (a huge ghost town of the Eastern Sierra region), Death Valley, Italy, Hawaii, Santa Cruz, California (his residence of 20 years), as well as several other photo trips to San Juan Island, and around the California Bay Area.

Lee also conducted workshops in stereo photography technique for the National Stereoscopic Association. Additionally, being a true artist, Lee stopped at and photographed the Hoover Dam, Zion National Park, Bryce Canyon National Park, and Rocky Mountain National Park along his travels to the National Stereoscopic Association Convention in Loveland, Colorado in July 2011.

Lee's photographs have been published internationally in the Finnish magazine Kamera Lehti (2014).

== Personal life ==
Lee was born in Merced, California. Lee died on Jan 28, 2015 at age 64 from complications associated with ALS. He is survived by his wife, researcher Deborah Kogan, and daughter, Rebeca Lee.
