= Anglican Bishop of Leeds =

Diocesan bishop in the Church of England

Bishop of Leeds
- Bishopric

anglican
- Coat of arms
- Incumbent; Toby Howarth

Location
- Ecclesiastical province: York
- Residence: Hollin House, Far Headingley, Leeds

Information
- First holder: Nicholas Baines
- Established: 20 April 2014
- Diocese: Leeds
- Cathedral: Ripon Cathedral; Wakefield Cathedral; Bradford Cathedral

The Anglican Bishop of Leeds is the ordinary of the Church of England Diocese of Leeds in the Province of York.

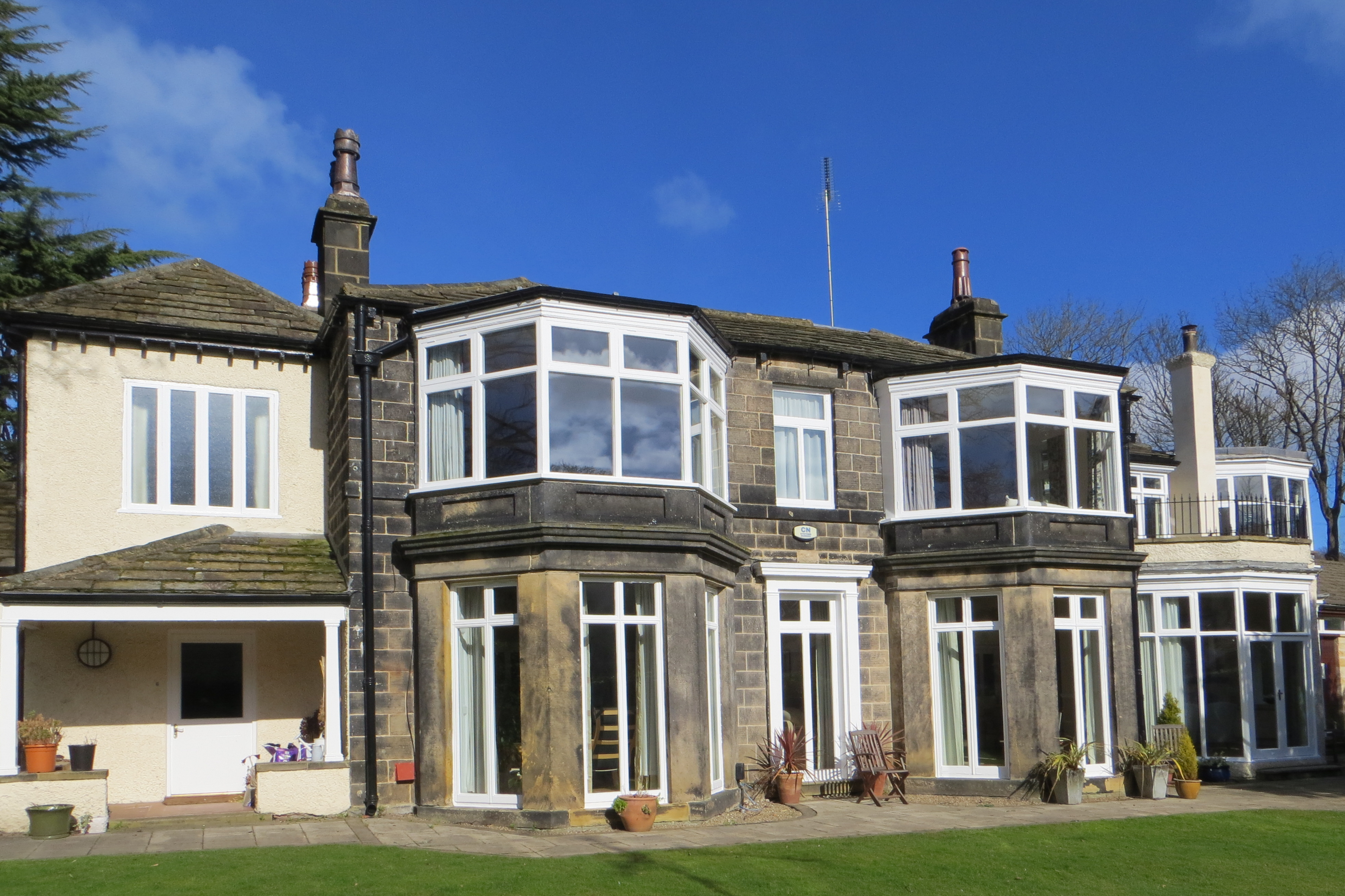
Hollin House, the Bishop's official residence

The diocese and see were created by The Dioceses of Bradford, Ripon and Leeds and Wakefield Reorganisation Scheme 2013 on 20 April 2014. Nick Baines became diocesan and area bishop of Leeds upon the confirmation of his election on 8 June 2014; but he acted as diocesan and area bishop from 22 April 2014. The bishop's residence is Hollin House, in the Far Headingley area of Leeds.

== List of bishops ==
Diocesan and Area Bishops of Leeds
From	Until	Incumbent	Notes
20 April 2014	22 April 2014	Tom Butler acting diocesan bishop	
20 April 2014	22 April 2014	James Bell; Bishop of Knaresborough and acting area bishop	
8 June 2014	30 November 2025	Nick Baines	Previously diocesan Bishop of Bradford; acting diocesan and area bishop 22 April–8 June 2014; announced 4 February 2014; confirmation of election 8 June.
6 November 2026	incumbent	Toby Howarth	Previously diocesan Bishop of Bradford; acting diocesan and area bishop 1 December 2025-6 November 2026;confirmation of election 6 November 2016.
