= Diocese of Bradford =

Church of England diocese, 1919 to 2014

Coordinates: 53.796°N 1.747°W

- Coat of arms

- Flag

Location
- Ecclesiastical province: York
- Archdeaconries: Bradford, Craven

Statistics
- Parishes: 133
- Churches: 166

Information
- Established: 25 November 1919–20 April 2014
- Cathedral: Bradford Cathedral

Current leadership
- Bishop: At dissolution: Nick Baines, Bishop of Bradford
- Archdeacons: At dissolution: David Lee, Archdeacon of Bradford; Paul Slater, Archdeacon of Craven

Website
- bradford.anglican.org

The Diocese of Bradford is a former Church of England diocese within the Province of York. The diocese covered the area of the City of Bradford, Craven district, the former Sedbergh Rural District now in Cumbria and the parts of the Lancashire boroughs of Pendle and Ribble Valley that are within Yorkshire's historic boundaries. The seat of the episcopal see was Bradford Cathedral and the bishop was the diocesan Bishop of Bradford.

The diocese was founded on 25 November 1919 from part of the Diocese of Ripon and dissolved in the creation of the Diocese of Leeds on 20 April 2014. The church of Saint Peter was elevated to cathedral status in 1919.

== Bishops ==
The diocesan Bishop of Bradford had no suffragan bishops. Immediately prior to its dissolution, alternative episcopal oversight (for parishes in the diocese who reject the ministry of priests who are women) was provided by the provincial episcopal visitor (PEV) the Bishop suffragan of Beverley (then Glyn Webster.) He was licensed as an honorary assistant bishop of the diocese in order to facilitate his work there. Besides Webster, there were two retired honorary assistant bishops licensed in the diocese:

- 2004–present: Colin Buchanan, retired former Area Bishop of Woolwich, lived in Alwoodley, Leeds (then in neighbouring Ripon and Leeds diocese)
- 2005–present: Retired former archbishop of York the Rt Revd The Lord Hope of Thornes lived in Hellifield, N. Yorks.

== Merger ==
On 2 March 2013, the diocesan synod voted in favour of proposals to abolish the diocese in order to create a larger Leeds diocese; the proposal was approved on 8 July 2013 by the General Synod. The merger came into force on 20 April 2014, at which point the Bradford, Ripon and Leeds and Wakefield dioceses merged.

== Bibliography ==
- Church of England Statistics 2002
- The Dioceses Commission's Yorkshire Review — A Guide to the Report
