= Nick Baines (bishop) =

British Anglican bishop and Lord Spiritual (born 1957)

The Right Reverend Nick Baines
- Bishop of Leeds
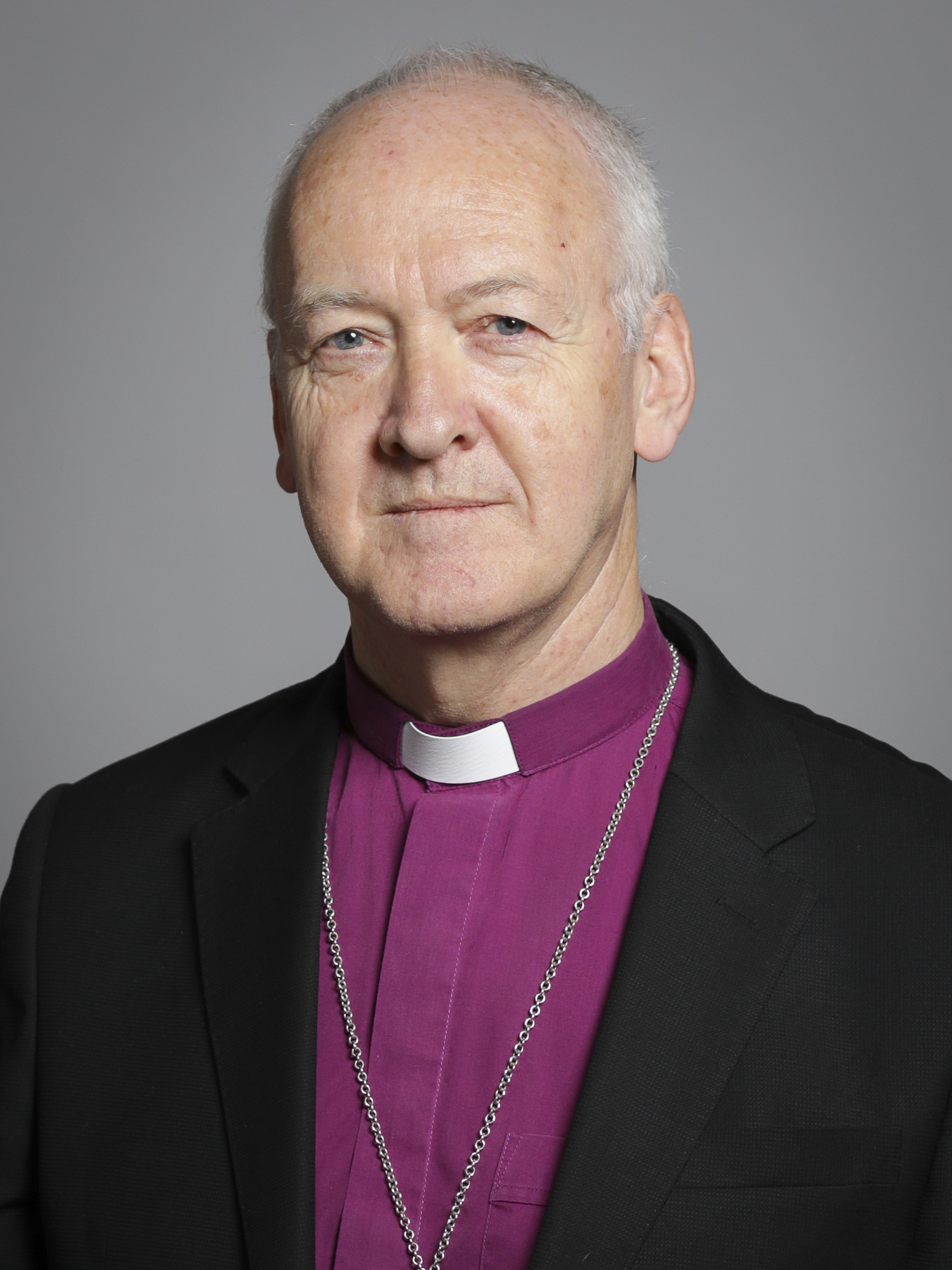
- The Lord Bishop of Leeds, 2019
- Church: Church of England
- Diocese: Diocese of Leeds
- In office: 8 June 2014 – 30 November 2025
- Predecessor: New see
- Other posts: area Bishop of Croydon (2003–2011); Bishop of Bradford (2011–2014); Acting Bishop of Leeds (22 April – 8 June 2014)

Orders
- Ordination: 1987 (deacon) by George Hacker; 1988 (priest) by David Halsey
- Consecration: 8 May 2003 by Rowan Williams

Personal details
- Born: 13 November 1957 (age 68) Liverpool, Lancashire, United Kingdom
- Denomination: Anglican
- Residence: Hollin House, Far Headingley, Leeds
- Spouse: Linda (m. 1980)
- Children: three
- Profession: formerly linguist
- Education: University of Bradford
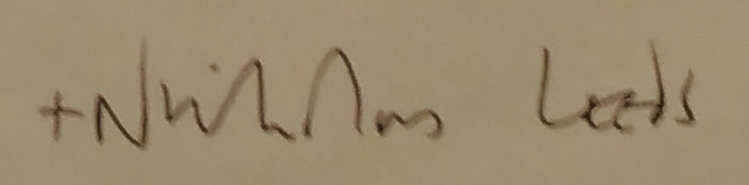
- Signature: Nick Baines's signature

Member of the House of Lords
- Lord Spiritual
- Bishop of Leeds; 5 February 2015 – 30 November 2025

Nicholas Baines (born 13 November 1957) is a retired British Anglican bishop. He served as Bishop of Leeds from 2014 to 2025, having previously been Bishop of Bradford from 2011 to 2014 and Bishop of Croydon from 2003 to 2011.

== Early life ==
Baines was educated at Holt Comprehensive School in Liverpool from 1969 to 1976 before studying at the University of Bradford, where he obtained a Bachelor of Arts degree in German and French in 1980. He then worked as a linguist at GCHQ for four years, where he also learned Russian.

He trained for ordination at Trinity College, Bristol, where he gained a Bachelor of Arts degree in theological studies.

== Ordained ministry ==
Baines was ordained a deacon at Petertide on 5 July 1987 by George Hacker, Bishop of Penrith, and was ordained a priest the following Petertide, on 3 July 1988, by David Halsey, Bishop of Carlisle, both times at Carlisle Cathedral. His first appointments were as assistant curate at St Thomas' Church, Kendal, and St Catherine's, Crook. He then moved to Leicester, serving briefly as associate minister of Holy Trinity Church before becoming vicar of Rothley (1992–2000), during which time he was also chaplain to an adult mental health unit. In 1995 he was appointed rural dean of Goscote. In 2000 Baines became Archdeacon of Lambeth in the Diocese of Southwark, where he oversaw the diocese's children and youth policies. He was a member of the General Synod of the Church of England from 1995 to 2005.

=== Episcopal ministry ===
Baines was appointed Bishop of Croydon in 2003, succeeding Wilfred Wood. He was consecrated by Rowan Williams, Archbishop of Canterbury, at St Paul's Cathedral and installed in Southwark Cathedral on 8 May 2003.

The confirmation of Baines's election to the see of Bradford was on 1 April 2011 and he was enthroned at Bradford Cathedral on 21 May 2011. In 2011 Baines said that "Christians should learn from Muslims how to exist as a 'minority' culture in British cities that are increasingly dominated by immigrant communities".

On 29 May 2013 he consecrated Nick Dill as Bishop of Bermuda on behalf of Justin Welby, Archbishop of Canterbury.

On 4 February 2014 it was announced that Baines would become the diocesan and area Bishop of Leeds upon the confirmation of his election on 8 June; he was acting diocesan and area bishop from 22 April 2014 (he was licensed as an honorary assistant bishop of the Diocese of York to facilitate the acting role).

On 2014 he took his seat in the House of Lords as one of the Lords Spiritual.

Baines is an experienced broadcaster, regularly appearing on Pause for Thought on BBC Radio 2. While in Leicester he broadcast regularly on BBC Radio Leicester and Leicester Sound and twice received a commendation in the Andrew Cross Awards for religious broadcasting.

In 2022, in the wake of the Russian invasion of Ukraine, Baines suggested that the Ukrainian military should cease fighting and entertain the prospect of the Crimea and the eastern Donbas region being annexed by Russia in order to achieve peace. While conceding that the long-term goal should be for Ukraine to control all its territory, Baines suggested that this might be achieved through diplomacy and easing sanctions.

Baines has announced his intention to retire effective 30 November 2025.

== Personal life ==
Baines married his wife, Linda, in 1980, and they have three children.

An accomplished linguist, he has preached and presented academic papers in German and in 2022 was awarded the Chartered Institute of Linguists David Crystal Award.

== Selected works ==
- Baines, Nick (1991). Hungry for Hope (1st ed.). London: Darton, Longman and Todd. ISBN 978-0232519235.
- Baines, Nick (2004). Speedbumps and Potholes: Looking for Signs of God in the Everyday. Edinburgh: Saint Andrews Press. ISBN 978-0715208069.
  - Am Rande bemerkt (German edition)
- Baines, Nick (2004). Jesus and People Like Us: The Transforming Power of Grace. Edinburgh: Saint Andrew Press. ISBN 978-0715208205.
- Baines, Nick (2005). Marking Time: 47 Reflections on Mark's Gospel for Lent, Holy Week and Easter. Edinburgh: Saint Andrew. ISBN 978-0715208298.
- Baines, Nick (2007). Hungry for Hope? (2nd ed.). Edinburgh: Saint Andrews Press. ISBN 978-0715208441.
- Baines, Nick (2008). Finding Faith: Stories of Music and Life: Getting in Tune with God. Edinburgh: Saint Andrew. ISBN 978-0715208687.
  - In hoechsten Toenen (German edition)
- Baines, Nick (2008). Scandal of Grace: the danger of following Jesus. Edinburgh: Saint Andrew Press. ISBN 978-0715208663.
- Baines, Nick (2009). Why Wish You a Merry Christmas?: What Matters (and What Doesn't) in the Festive Season. London: Church House Publishing. ISBN 978-0956282101.

== Styles ==
- The Reverend Nick Baines (1987–2000)
- The Venerable Nick Baines (2000–2003)
- The Right Reverend Nick Baines (2003–present)

Church of England titles
Preceded by Dick Bird	Archdeacon of Lambeth; 2000–2003	Succeeded by Chris Skilton
Preceded by Wilfred Wood	Bishop of Croydon; 2003–2011	Succeeded by Jonathan Clark
Preceded by David James	Bishop of Bradford; 2011–2014	diocese dissolved
New title	Bishop of Leeds; 8 June 2014 – present (Acting 22 April – 8 June 2014)	Incumbent
