= Frederick Ackerley =

Anglican priest

The Venerable Frederick Ackerley FRSA

Archdeacon of Bradford
- In office 1932–1934

Archdeacon of Craven
- In office 1934–1949

Personal details
- Born: 12 November 1871
- Died: 21 October 1954 (aged 82)
- Spouse(s): 1902 Vera Mary née Hill (d 1947); 1949 Phyllis née Ray

Frederick George Ackerley (1871–1954) was an Anglican priest in the Church of England, at different times the Archdeacon of Bradford then Craven. He was also an acknowledged scholar of Romany language and culture.

Ackerley was educated at Rossall School and Jesus College, Oxford and ordained in 1898. He served curacies in Keighley, Eccles, and Washington and incumbencies at Grindleton, Great Mitton and Carleton-in-Craven. Later he was Rural Dean of Bolland before his years as an Archdeacon.
