= Anglican Diocese of Leeds =

Diocese of the Church of England

Coordinates: 53.799789°N 1.530499°W

Diocese of Leeds Dioecesis Loidensis
- Coat of arms

- Flag

Location
- Territory: West Yorkshire, western North Yorkshire, northern Barnsley, Lancashire (West Craven), County Durham (South Teesdale), Cumbria (Sedbergh area)
- Ecclesiastical province: Province of York
- Archdeaconries: Richmond and Craven, Halifax, Leeds, Pontefract, Bradford

Statistics
- Area: 2,425 sq mi (6,280 km^{2})
- Population: Total: 2,614,000
- Parishes: 462
- Churches: 656

Information
- Denomination: Church of England
- Established: 20 April 2014
- Cathedral: Equally: Ripon Cathedral, Wakefield Cathedral & Bradford Cathedral
- Secular priests: 467

Current leadership
- Bishop: Bishop of Leeds (vacant; acting: the Bishop of Bradford)
- Suffragans: Toby Howarth, area Bishop of Bradford; Arun Arora, suffragan Bishop of Kirkstall (area bishop for Leeds); Smitha Prasadam, area Bishop of Huddersfield; Anna Eltringham, area Bishop of Ripon; Malcolm Chamberlain, area Bishop of Wakefield
- Archdeacons: Andy Jolley, Archdeacon of Bradford; Paul Ayers, Archdeacon of Leeds; Bill Braviner, Archdeacon of Halifax; Cat Thatcher, Archdeacon of Pontefract; James Theodosius, Archdeacon of Richmond and Craven

Website
- www.leeds.anglican.org

The Anglican Diocese of Leeds (previously and informally also known as the Diocese of West Yorkshire and the Dales) is a diocese (administrative division) of the Church of England, in the Province of York. It is the largest diocese in England by area, comprising much of western Yorkshire: almost the whole of West Yorkshire, the western part of North Yorkshire, the town of Barnsley in South Yorkshire, and most of the parts of County Durham, Cumbria and Lancashire which lie within the historic boundaries of Yorkshire. It includes the cities of Leeds, Bradford, Wakefield and Ripon. It was created on 20 April 2014 following a review of the dioceses in Yorkshire and the dissolution of the dioceses of Bradford, Ripon and Leeds, and Wakefield.

The diocese is led by the Anglican Bishop of Leeds and has three cathedrals of equal status: Ripon, Wakefield, and Bradford. There are five episcopal areas within the diocese, each led by an area bishop: Leeds, Ripon, Wakefield, Bradford and Huddersfield.

== Formation ==
=== Review and 2010 report ===
The Dioceses Commission (as established in a new form in 2008), began its review of the dioceses of Yorkshire (York, Ripon & Leeds, Wakefield, Sheffield and Bradford) on the 2009 recommendation of the House of Bishops. The review group considered the best ways for the Church of England in Yorkshire to serve the Church's mission to those communities. The group quickly decided that the dioceses of York and of Sheffield would need little adjustment, so focused on the dioceses in West Yorkshire and The Dales.

In its first report, published December 2010, the Commission suggested one large diocese covering the area currently covered by the dioceses of Ripon & Leeds, of Wakefield and of Bradford, but divided into five episcopal areas, each with an area bishop (using the "area model" used elsewhere, e.g. the Diocese of London). Additionally, one of those five area bishops would also be the diocesan bishop over the new diocese. The five areas (and bishops) suggested were based on considerations including civic communities and established foci of local church activity. Those areas are: Ripon, Wakefield, Bradford, Leeds and Huddersfield. Creating this diocese and area system would involve completely dissolving the existing diocesan sees, renaming the two existing suffragan sees and creating a new diocesan see and two more suffragan sees.

The Archdeaconry of Richmond would expand into the current Archdeaconry of Craven (Diocese of Bradford) and be renamed the Archdeaconry of Richmond and Craven, and would form the episcopal area of Ripon, while the Archdeaconry of Halifax would form the episcopal area of Huddersfield. The Leeds episcopal area would consist the Archdeaconry of Leeds, the Bradford area the Archdeaconry of Bradford and the Wakefield area the Archdeaconry of Pontefract.

In the 2010 report, a newly created bishop of Wakefield would have been the diocesan bishop, and the diocese called the Diocese of Wakefield. Wakefield Cathedral would have been the "principal cathedral", while Bradford and Ripon Cathedrals would have remained as cathedrals of the diocese, with "seat[s] of honour" for their respective area bishops. The current colleges of the cathedrals would merge into one diocesan college, with the dean of Wakefield as dean and the deans of Bradford and of Ripon would become vice-deans of that college.

=== Draft scheme ===
Following extensive consultation with the three dioceses and other interested parties, the commission issued a second report and Draft Reorganisation Scheme in October 2011. The draft scheme featured a few alterations from the initial report:

- As the largest and most populous city in the area, it was generally felt that Leeds should be the diocesan see. Thus, the new diocese would be the Diocese of Leeds and its diocesan bishop the bishop of Leeds.
- Accordingly, none of the three cathedrals would be a "principal cathedral". Rather, they would have equal status, with a merged college led by a presiding dean (initially the senior one by tenure – i.e. Jonathan Greener, Dean of Wakefield – but later the one appointed by the diocesan bishop), while each cathedral's dean would remain in charge of his or her own cathedral.
- Additionally, Leeds Minster would become the pro-cathedral for the new diocese if and when the diocesan bishop decided. The governance of that church would not change, but the rector would become a canon of the diocesan college.

It was announced on 28 September 2012 that the commission had resolved, having considered all responses to its public consultation, to go ahead with the draft scheme, which would be discussed and voted upon at the three diocesan synods.

=== 2013 diocesan votes and creation ===
The existing diocesan synods of the dioceses of Bradford, of Ripon and Leeds and of Wakefield voted on the proposed scheme on 2 March 2013. The Bradford and Ripon & Leeds diocesan synods voted in favour of the proposals, while Wakefield's did not; however, the scheme could go before the General Synod of the Church of England without all three dioceses' approval according to the discretion of the archbishop of York. On 9 May 2013, the archbishop announced that he had instructed the chair of the Dioceses Commission to set the Draft Scheme before General Synod for consideration (i.e. debate and voting.)

The proposal was approved on 8 July 2013 by the General Synod. The new diocese was created on Easter Day, 20 April 2014, becoming the first new diocese in the Church of England since 1929 and the largest diocese in England by area, covering 2,425 square miles (6,280 km^{2}) and 2.3 million people, served by 656 churches.

=== 2017 deanery reorganisations ===
Effective 1 January 2017, several of the diocese's deaneries were reorganised. Among these were all the deaneries of the Bradford archdeaconry, which were entirely redrawn from five into four, and the deaneries of Bowland and of Ewecross (in Richmond and Craven archdeaconry), both of which had lost parishes in the diocese's formation, merged into one deanery (Bowland and Ewecross).

== Organisation ==
The diocese (which was usually referred to, from 2014 until 14 July 2016 as the Diocese of West Yorkshire and the Dales to reflect the geographical area it covers) is led by the bishop of Leeds. There are five episcopal areas within the diocese, each led by an area bishop: Leeds, Ripon, Wakefield, Bradford and Huddersfield.

=== Bishop of Leeds ===
Once the three dioceses were dissolved by the scheme on 20 April 2014, the diocesan see of Leeds was newly constituted a diocesan see, whose incumbent, the Bishop of Leeds, is bishop over the whole diocese generally and the Leeds episcopal area specifically. He has cathedrals at Ripon Cathedral, at Wakefield Cathedral, at Bradford Cathedral and, if and only if he designates the minster as a pro-cathedral, at Leeds Minster.

It was announced on 8 November 2013 that a retired Bishop of Southwark, Tom Butler, would serve as "mentor bishop" for the diocese prior to the first diocesan bishop taking post. During that period, Butler was also the interim area bishop in the Bradford area while the bishop of Knaresborough was also interim area bishop in the Leeds area. It was further announced on 4 February 2014 that Nick Baines would be the first diocesan and area Bishop of Leeds; it was further announced on 15 April that Baines would be acting diocesan bishop and acting area bishop for Leeds from 22 April.

=== Bishop of Ripon ===
After the dissolution of the diocesan see of Ripon and Leeds, the suffragan see of Knaresborough was transferred by Order in Council to Ripon on 19 March 2015. The incumbent is the area bishop over the Ripon episcopal area; James Bell, then suffragan Bishop of Knaresborough, continued in post as the area bishop in the Ripon area and, until the diocesan bishop started acting as area bishop on 22 April, was additionally interim area bishop in the Leeds area. The area bishopric vacant since Helen-Ann Hartley's translation to Newcastle on 3 February 2023.

=== Bishop of Wakefield ===
Following the dissolution of Wakefield diocese, the suffragan see of Pontefract was transferred by Order in Council to Wakefield on 19 March 2015. The incumbent is the area bishop over the Wakefield episcopal area; Tony Robinson, then suffragan Bishop of Pontefract, continued in post as the area bishop in the Wakefield area and, until a Bishop of Huddersfield was appointed, was also acting as interim area bishop in the Huddersfield area. Since 2025, Malcolm Chamberlain has been area Bishop of Wakefield.

=== Bishop of Bradford ===
Once the diocesan see of the same name was dissolved, a new suffragan see of Bradford was created by the Scheme. The incumbent is the area bishop over the Bradford episcopal area; since the appointment of a new area bishop had to wait until the diocesan bishop was in post, the diocesan 'mentor bishop', Tom Butler, initially served as interim area bishop in the Bradford area. On 26 August 2014, it was announced that Toby Howarth was to become the first area bishop of Bradford; his consecration was held on 17 October.

=== Bishop of Huddersfield ===
The scheme also created a new suffragan see of Huddersfield, whose incumbent is the area bishop over the Huddersfield episcopal area. Significant churches in the area include Huddersfield Parish Church, Halifax Minster and Dewsbury Minster. Since no new area bishop could be appointed until the diocesan bishop was in post, the bishop of Pontefract also served as interim area bishop in the Huddersfield area. On 26 August 2014, it was announced that Jonathan Gibbs was to become the first area bishop of Huddersfield; his consecration was held on 17 October. He was translated to Rochester on 24 May 2022. On 8 March 2023, it was announced that Smitha Prasadam was to be the next area bishop; she was duly consecrated a bishop by Stephen Cottrell, Archbishop of York, at York Minster on 22 June 2023.

=== Bishop of Kirkstall (formerly Bishop of Richmond) ===
On 29 April 2015, the diocese announced that the See of Richmond would be revived for a suffragan bishop to assist the bishop of Leeds in his area bishop duties. On 19 July 2015, Paul Slater was consecrated to that see.

On 14 March 2018, the see was translated from Richmond to Kirkstall (in Leeds) by Order in Council.

=== Other bishops ===
Alternative episcopal oversight (for petitioning parishes in the diocese who reject the ministry of priests or bishops who are women) in the diocese was provided by Tony Robinson, area Bishop of Wakefield, until he retired in 2024.

At the first diocesan synod, three retired honorary assistant bishops were welcomed:

- Clive Handford, former Presiding Bishop in Jerusalem and the Middle East and diocesan Bishop of Cyprus and the Gulf, was licensed in the Diocese of Ripon and Leeds from 2007. He lives in Kirby-on-the-Moor.
- David Hawkins, area Bishop of Barking, retired to Skipton.
- Chris Edmondson, retired suffragan Bishop of Bolton

At the second diocesan synod, John Pritchard, retired Bishop of Oxford, was licensed as an honorary assistant bishop.

Immediately prior to the formation of the new diocese, there were four other retired honorary assistant bishops licensed in the three predecessor dioceses:

- the late David Jenkins, (d. 2016) former Bishop of Durham lived in Barnard Castle, County Durham and was licensed in Ripon & Leeds diocese from 1993.
- the late Colin Buchanan, former area Bishop of Woolwich and suffragan Bishop of Aston lived in Alwoodley, Leeds and was licensed as an honorary assistant bishop in Bradford diocese from 2004 and in Ripon & Leeds from 2005.
- A former Archbishop of York, David Hope, lives in Hellifield, Craven. He was licensed as an honorary assistant bishop in Bradford diocese in 2005 and in the Diocese of Blackburn in 2008; it was reported on 31 October 2014 that Hope had resigned his licence in Leeds diocese.
- Tom Butler, retired Bishop of Southwark and former interim area bishop in Bradford, was licensed in Wakefield from 2010 and in Bradford from 2013. He lives in Walton, Wakefield.
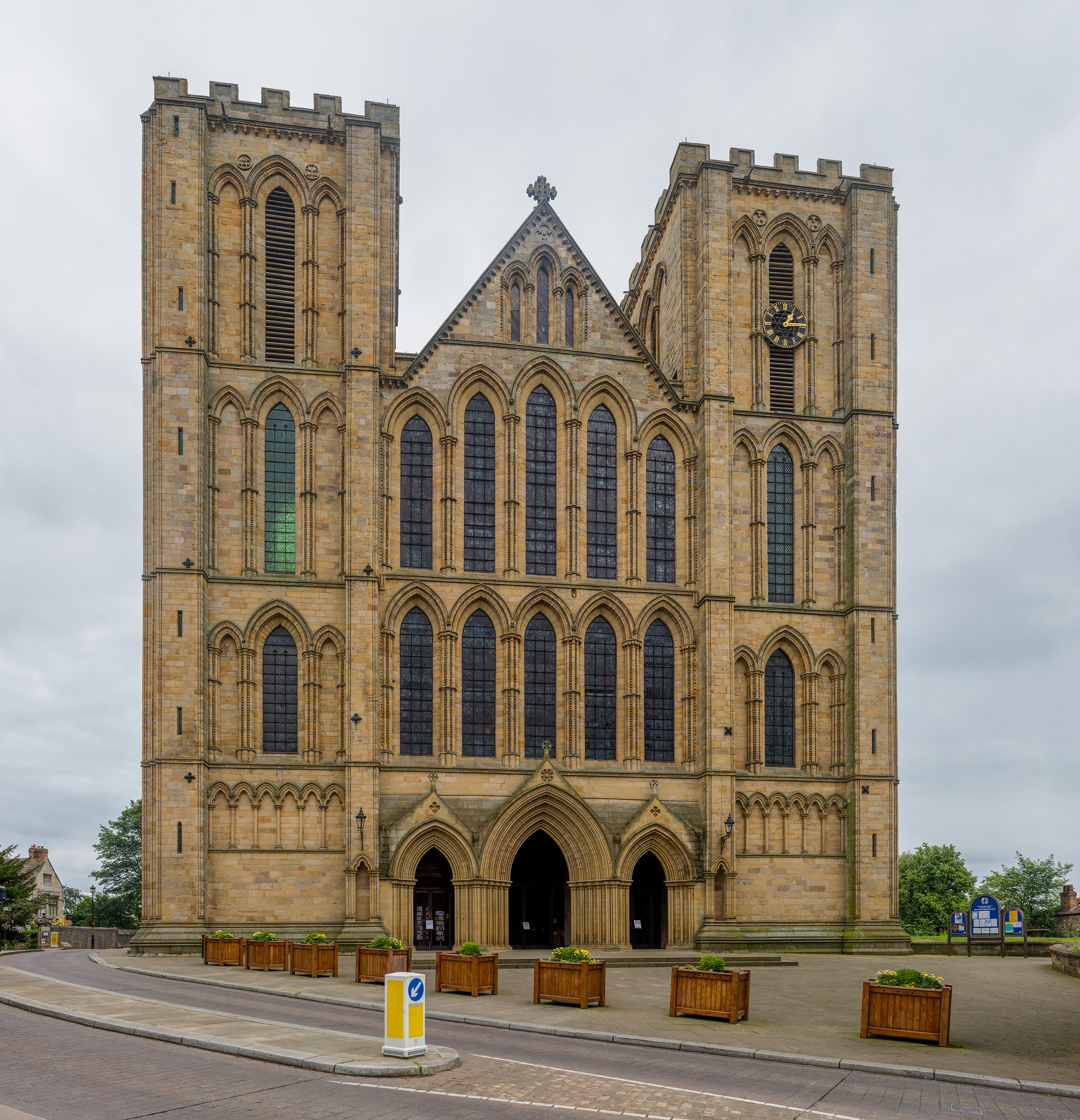
Ripon Cathedral

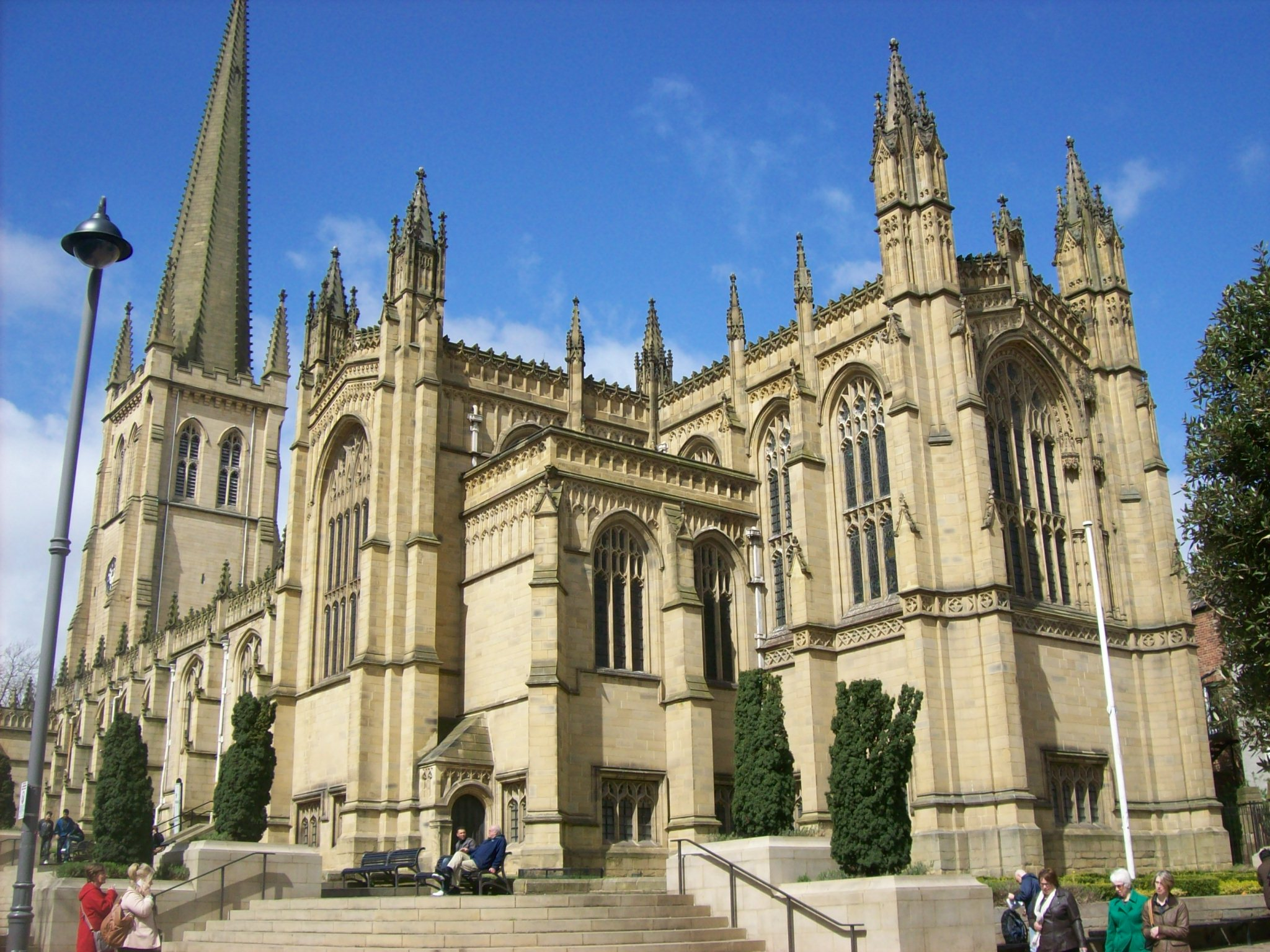
Wakefield Cathedral

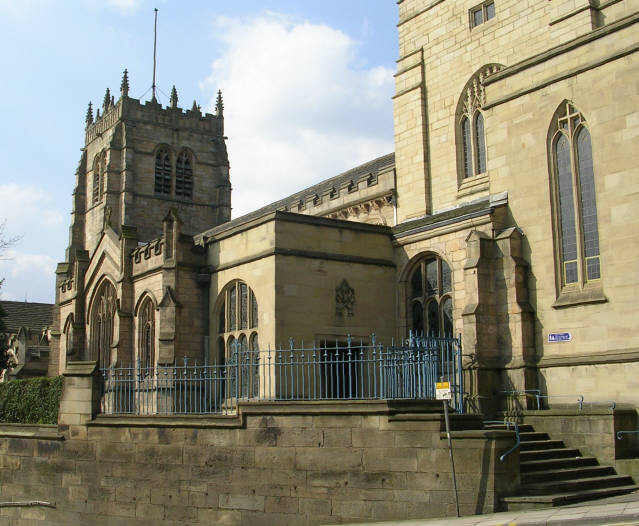
Bradford Cathedral

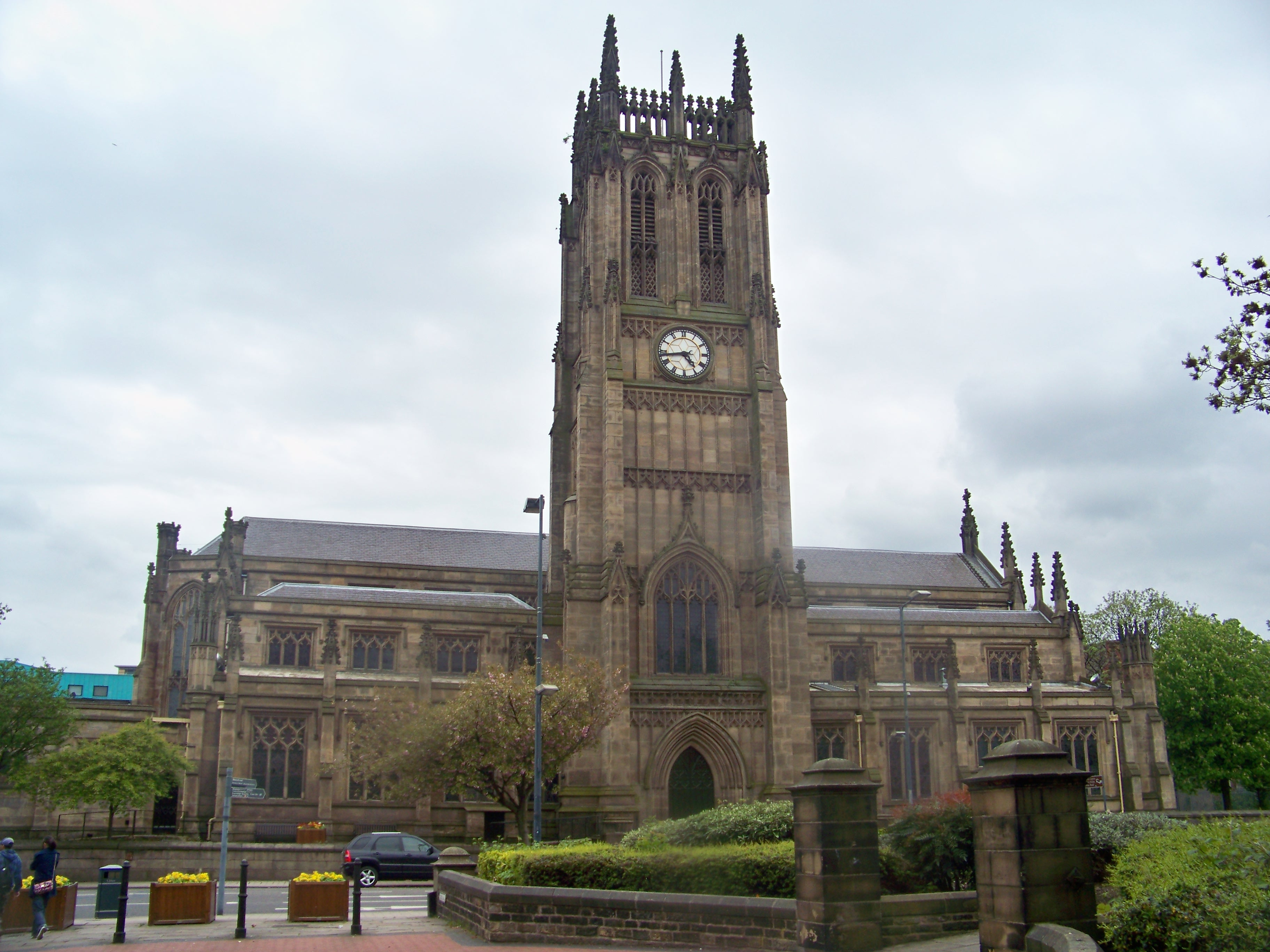
Leeds Minster

== Archdeaconries and deaneries ==
| Episcopal area | Archdeaconries | Rural Deaneries | Paid clergy | Churches | Population | People per clergy | People per church | Churches per clergy |
|---|---|---|---|---|---|---|---|---|
| Bradford Episcopal Area (area Bishop of Bradford) | Archdeaconry of Bradford | Deanery of Aire & Worth | 18.5 | 29 | 143,866 | 7,777 | 4,961 | 1.57 |
| Bradford Episcopal Area (area Bishop of Bradford) | Archdeaconry of Bradford | Deanery of Inner Bradford | 16.5* | 18* | 175,979* | 10,665 | 9,777 | 1.09 |
| Bradford Episcopal Area (area Bishop of Bradford) | Archdeaconry of Bradford | Deanery of Outer Bradford | 19 | 22 | 177,757 | 9,356 | 8,080 | 1.16 |
| Bradford Episcopal Area (area Bishop of Bradford) | Archdeaconry of Bradford | Deanery of South Craven & Wharfedale | 12 | 13 | 53,328 | 4,444 | 4,102 | 1.08 |
| Huddersfield Episcopal Area (area Bishop of Huddersfield) | Archdeaconry of Halifax | Deanery of Almondbury | 6 | 16 | 73,391 | 12,232 | 4,587 | 2.67 |
| Huddersfield Episcopal Area (area Bishop of Huddersfield) | Archdeaconry of Halifax | Deanery of Birstall | 7 | 13 | 72,466 | 10,352 | 5,574 | 1.86 |
| Huddersfield Episcopal Area (area Bishop of Huddersfield) | Archdeaconry of Halifax | Deanery of Brighouse & Elland | 9 | 17 | 67,559 | 7,507 | 3,974 | 1.89 |
| Huddersfield Episcopal Area (area Bishop of Huddersfield) | Archdeaconry of Halifax | Deanery of Calder Valley | 3 | 11 | 40,260 | 13,420 | 3,660 | 3.67 |
| Huddersfield Episcopal Area (area Bishop of Huddersfield) | Archdeaconry of Halifax | Deanery of Dewsbury | 8 | 17 | 111,583 | 13,948 | 6,564 | 2.13 |
| Huddersfield Episcopal Area (area Bishop of Huddersfield) | Archdeaconry of Halifax | Deanery of Halifax | 14 | 16 | 91,155 | 6,511 | 5,697 | 1.14 |
| Huddersfield Episcopal Area (area Bishop of Huddersfield) | Archdeaconry of Halifax | Deanery of Huddersfield | 10 | 19 | 108,820 | 10,882 | 5,727 | 1.9 |
| Huddersfield Episcopal Area (area Bishop of Huddersfield) | Archdeaconry of Halifax | Deanery of Kirkburton | 10 | 20 | 55,470 | 5,547 | 2,774 | 2 |
| Leeds Episcopal Area (area Bishop of Kirkstall) | Archdeaconry of Leeds | Deanery of Allerton | 15 | 19 | 146,872 | 9,791 | 7,730 | 1.27 |
| Leeds Episcopal Area (area Bishop of Kirkstall) | Archdeaconry of Leeds | Deanery of Armley | 19 | 29 | 239,414 | 12,601 | 8,256 | 1.53 |
| Leeds Episcopal Area (area Bishop of Kirkstall) | Archdeaconry of Leeds | Deanery of Headingley | 19 | 21 | 180,799 | 9,516 | 8,609 | 1.11 |
| Leeds Episcopal Area (area Bishop of Kirkstall) | Archdeaconry of Leeds | Deanery of Whitkirk | 15 | 18 | 147,203 | 9,814 | 8,178 | 1.2 |
| Wakefield Episcopal Area (area Bishop of Wakefield) | Archdeaconry of Pontefract | Deanery of Barnsley | 12 | 21 | 123,937 | 10,328 | 5,902 | 1.75 |
| Wakefield Episcopal Area (area Bishop of Wakefield) | Archdeaconry of Pontefract | Deanery of Pontefract | 16 | 30 | 151,482 | 9,468 | 5,049 | 1.88 |
| Wakefield Episcopal Area (area Bishop of Wakefield) | Archdeaconry of Pontefract | Deanery of Wakefield | 26* | 31* | 177,831* | 6,840 | 5,736 | 1.19 |
| Ripon Episcopal Area (area Bishop of Ripon) | Archdeaconry of Richmond & Craven | Deanery of Bowland & Ewecross | 9 | 25 | 19,007 | 2,112 | 760 | 2.78 |
| Ripon Episcopal Area (area Bishop of Ripon) | Archdeaconry of Richmond & Craven | Deanery of Harrogate | 21 | 41 | 122,920 | 5,853 | 2,998 | 1.95 |
| Ripon Episcopal Area (area Bishop of Ripon) | Archdeaconry of Richmond & Craven | Deanery of Richmond | 11 | 44 | 47,485 | 4,317 | 1,079 | 4 |
| Ripon Episcopal Area (area Bishop of Ripon) | Archdeaconry of Richmond & Craven | Deanery of Ripon | 12* | 53* | 46,939* | 3,912 | 886 | 4.42 |
| Ripon Episcopal Area (area Bishop of Ripon) | Archdeaconry of Richmond & Craven | Deanery of Skipton | 10 | 23 | 41,123 | 4,112 | 1,788 | 2.3 |
| Ripon Episcopal Area (area Bishop of Ripon) | Archdeaconry of Richmond & Craven | Deanery of Wensley | 8.5 | 36 | 25,765 | 5,153 | 716 | 4.24 |
| Total/average | | | 323 | 602 | 2,642,411 | 8,181 | 4,389 | 1.86 |

*including a cathedral

=== Archdeacon of Mission Resources ===
Between his resignation as Archdeacon of Bradford (31 July 2015) and his retirement (31 January 2016), David Lee was given the unique role of "Archdeacon of Mission Resources". He was given an archidiaconal title and status, but no territorial archdeaconry. The role has not been re-filled since.
