= David Lee (archdeacon of Bradford) =

The Venerable David Lee MA

Archdeacon of Bradford
- In office 2004–2015

Archdeacon emeritus
- Incumbent
- Assumed office 2015

Personal details
- Spouse: Janet Mary Lee Strong

David John Lee (born 31 January 1946) is a former Archdeacon of Bradford in the Church of England Diocese of Leeds. On retirement as an archdeacon he was made archdeacon emeritus and given a co-ordinating role for mission resources in the diocese until his expected retirement in 2016.

Lee was educated at Fitzwilliam College, Cambridge and ordained after an earlier career as a schoolmaster in 1978. After a curacy at St Margaret's, Putney he became a Lecturer: firstly in Theology at the Bishop Tucker College in Mukono, Uganda (1980–1986); and then in Missiology at Selly Oak College, Birmingham (1986–1991). He was Rector of Middleton and St Chad's Church, Wishaw from 1991 to 1996 when he became Director of Mission for the Diocese of Birmingham and a canon residentiary at the city's cathedral: posts he held until his appointment as an archdeacon.

== Notes ==
Church of England titles
Preceded by Guy Alexander Wilkinson	Archdeacon of Bradford; 2004–2015	Succeeded by Andy Jolley
