= Province of York =

Church of England ecclesiastical province

- Church: Church of England
- Metropolitan bishop: Archbishop of York
- Cathedral: York Minster
- Dioceses: 12

The Province of York, or less formally the Northern Province, is one of two ecclesiastical provinces making up the Church of England and consists of 14 dioceses which cover the northern third of England and the Isle of Man. York was elevated to an archbishopric in AD 735: Ecgbert was the first archbishop. At one time, the archbishops of York also claimed metropolitan authority over Scotland, but these claims were never realised and ceased when the Archdiocese of St Andrews was established.

The province's metropolitan bishop is the archbishop of York (the junior of the Church of England's two archbishops). York Minster serves as the mother church of the Province of York.

== Boundary changes since the mid-19th century ==
In 1836, the diocese of Ripon was formed (Diocese of Ripon and Leeds from 1999 until 2014), followed by further foundations: Manchester in 1847, Liverpool in 1880, Newcastle in 1882, Wakefield in 1888, Sheffield in 1914, Bradford in 1919, Blackburn in 1926, and Leeds in 2014.

The Diocese of Southwell (Southwell and Nottingham since 2005) was a special case: in 1837, the archdeaconry of Nottingham, which until then had formed part of the Diocese of York, was transferred to the Diocese of Lincoln and hence to the Province of Canterbury. In 1884, the counties of Nottinghamshire and Derbyshire were merged to form the new Diocese of Southwell. The Diocese of Derby was created in 1927, removing Derbyshire from Southwell's jurisdiction, and in 1935 the diocese of Southwell was transferred back to the province of York.
