= Paul Slater =

English Anglican bishop (b.1958)

The Right Reverend Paul Slater
- Bishop of Kirkstall
- Church: Church of England
- Diocese: Diocese of Leeds
- In office: 19 July 2015 – 31 January 2022
- Other posts: Archdeacon of Craven (2005–2014); Archdeacon of Richmond and Craven (2014–2015); Bishop of Richmond (2015–2018; title changed)

Orders
- Ordination: 1984 (deacon); 1985 (priest)
- Consecration: 19 July 2015 by John Sentamu

Personal details
- Born: 22 March 1958 (age 68)
- Denomination: Anglican
- Spouse: Beverley
- Children: Two
- Education: Bradford Grammar School; Corpus Christi College, Oxford; St John's College, Durham

Paul John Slater (born 22 March 1958) is a retired Anglican bishop. From 2018 until January 2022, he was the Bishop of Kirkstall, a suffragan bishop in the Diocese of Leeds. He was previously the Archdeacon of Craven from 2005 to April 2014, Archdeacon of Richmond and Craven from April 2014 to July 2015, and the Bishop of Richmond from 2015 until his title (but not his role) changed to Bishop of Kirkstall in 2018.

== Early life ==
Slater was born on 22 March 1958. He was educated at Bradford Grammar School, then a direct grant grammar school in Bradford, Yorkshire. He studied chemistry at Corpus Christi College, Oxford and graduated with a Bachelor of Arts (BA) degree, which was later promoted to a Master of Arts (MA Oxon) degree in 1983.

In 1981, Slater entered Cranmer Hall (part of St John's College, Durham) to study for ordination. He graduated from Durham University with a BA degree in theology in 1983 and completed a further year of training for ministry at Cranmer Hall.

== Ordained ministry ==
Slater was ordained in the Anglican ministry as a deacon in 1984 and as a priest in 1985. From 1984 to 1988, he served his curacy at St Andrew's, Keighley, in the Diocese of Bradford. He was then appointed Priest in charge of St John the Evangelist, Cullingworth, and Director of the Diocesan Foundation Course between 1988 and 1993.

He became the personal executive assistant to the Bishop of Bradford from 1993 to 1995, and was Warden of Readers from 1992 to 1996. He later became the Rector of St Michael and All Angels Church, Haworth, from 1995 to 2001, before becoming the Bishop's Officer for Ministry and Mission from 2001 to 2005.

He was appointed Archdeacon of Craven in 2005 and became the acting Archdeacon of Richmond on 2 February 2014. When the two posts were merged, he became the Archdeacon of Richmond and Craven on 20 April 2014. His residence was at Kadugli House, Keighley.

=== Episcopal ministry ===
On 18 June 2015, it was announced that Slater would become the next Bishop of Richmond, a suffragan bishop in the Diocese of Leeds. The bishopric of Richmond had been in abeyance since 1921. He was consecrated during a service at Ripon Cathedral on 19 July by John Sentamu, Archbishop of York. This was the first consecration to take place at Ripon Cathedral since that of Thomas de Kirkcudbright as Bishop of Galloway in 1293.

On 14 March 2018, Slater's See was translated from Richmond to Kirkstall (in Leeds) by Order in Council;. He kept the same role but became Bishop of Kirkstall.

In October 2021, it was announced that Slater would retire from the post on 31 January 2022.

== Personal life ==
Slater is married to Beverley, who works for the National Health Service. Together, they have two adult sons.

Church of England titles
| Preceded by Malcolm Grundy | Archdeacon of Craven; 2005 to 20 April 2014 | Title merged with Richmond |
| Preceded by Nicholas Henshall as acting archdeacon | Acting Archdeacon of Richmond; 2 February 2014 to 20 April 2014 | Title merged with Craven |
| New title | Archdeacon of Richmond and Craven; 20 April 2014 to 19 July 2015 | Succeeded by Bev Mason |
| Vacant Title last held by Francis Kilner | Bishop of Richmond; 19 July 2015 to 2018 | Succeeded by himself as Bishop of Kirkstall |
| Preceded by himself as Bishop of Richmond | Bishop of Kirkstall; 2018 to 31 January 2022 | Succeeded by Arun Arora |
