= Herbert Media =

Coordinates: 52.4072°N 1.5063°W

Herbert Media is the in-house media service at the Herbert Art Gallery and Museum in Coventry, England. It manages recording studios, video editing rooms and training rooms, and produces much of the audio and visual sequences for the museum's exhibitions and permanent displays.

Herbert Media was formerly known as the Depot Studios. It relocated to The Herbert and re-opened in October 2005.

== Production facilities ==
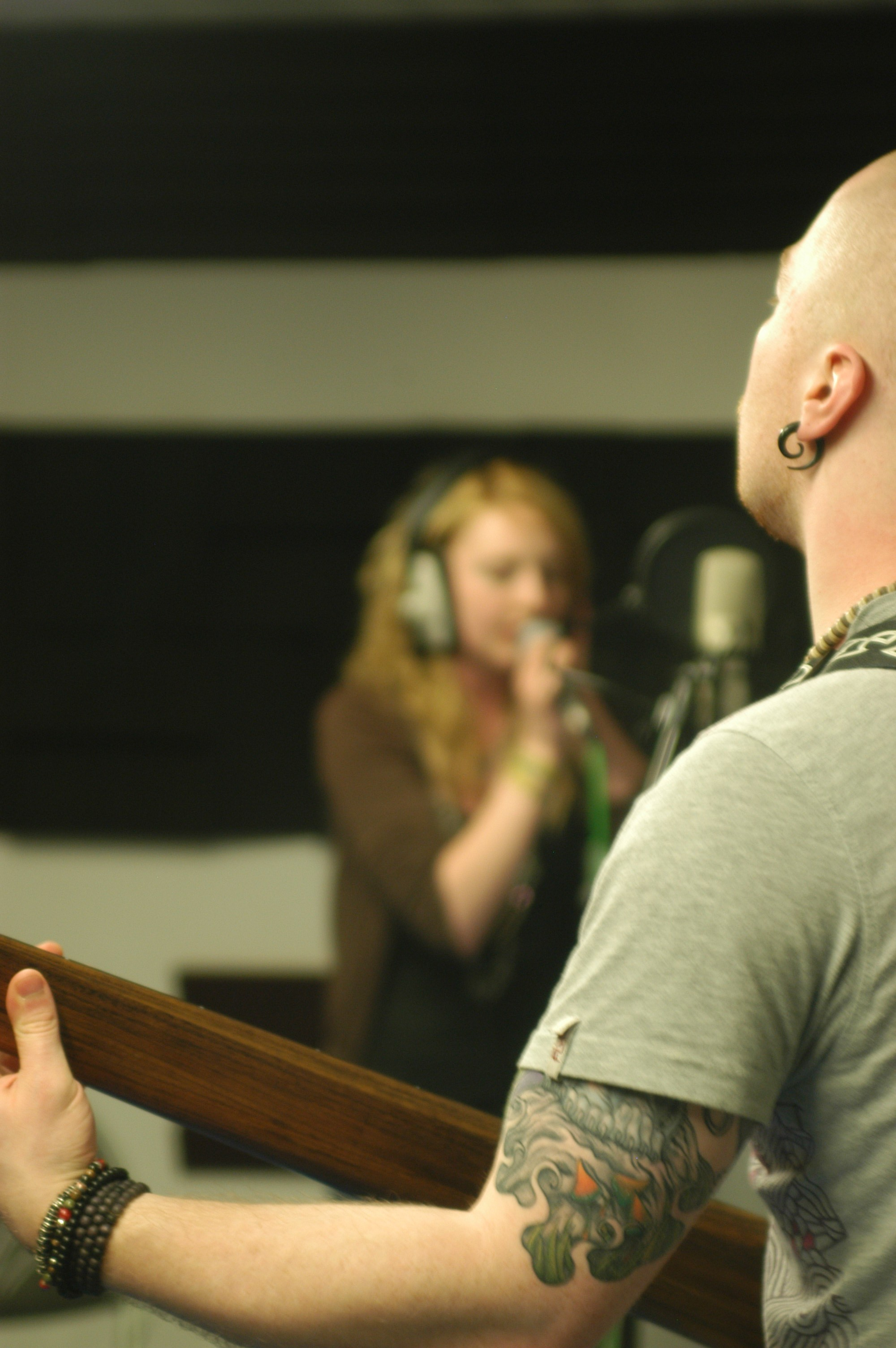
Recording at Herbert Media.

Herbert Media is unique within the UK in being situated within a regional gallery and museum.

The facilities available at The Herbert include a large hireable exhibition space called 'The Studio', which is frequently used by the public and organisations. There is also a 'New Media Suite', with modern IT facilities, a Recording Studio (which comprises live and control rooms) and a MIDI Suite. Further Herbert Media facilities include Standard Definition and High Definition video editing suites, a corporate training room, and an arts information centre with additional resources and a reference library.

== Film production ==
Herbert Media produces films from scripting and planning through to filming, editing and duplication. In addition to producing much of the audio and visual sequences for the exhibitions and permanent displays at The Herbert, it also coordinates 'community response' films to exhibitions within the gallery as a way of further connecting art to the community.

Herbert Media also specialises in making films and interactive materials for other museums and art galleries. Film productions include:

- Documentaries broadcast on the Community Channel
- Museum and Gallery installations and interactives
- Marketing and fund-raising campaigns
- Conference and Award ceremonies
- Public information and educational materials
- Broadcast on the web

The service was rewarded for its high standard of work in the 2009 Godiva Awards, winning the Innovation in Business Practice category. This award is given for businesses that "demonstrate superior standards in innovation at work".

In February 2010, Herbert Media was runner-up in the Most Innovative Project category at the West Midlands Renaissance Awards, for the in-house delivery of a BTEC multi-media course for Foxford School and Community Arts College.

== Audio-visual services and projects ==
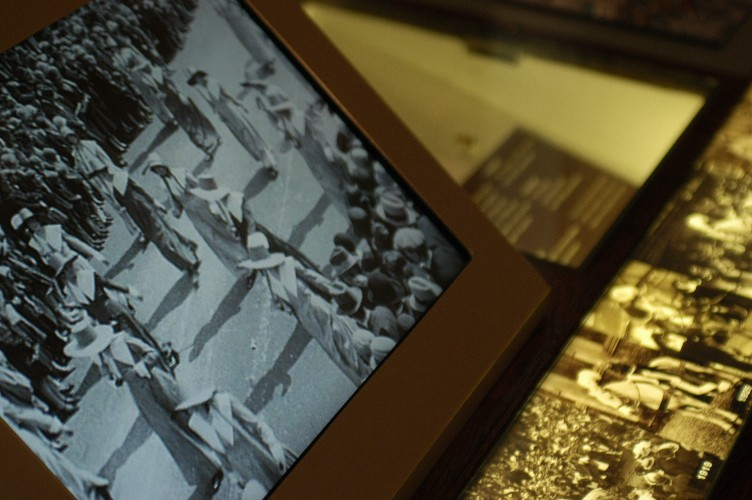
Audio-Visual gallery work

Herbert Media provide much of the audio-visual material of the gallery using archive film footage from around Coventry for use in exhibitions and permanent displays, and coordinate media services for ceremonies and events held at the Art Gallery and Museum.

Herbert Media produces podcasts which offer a "behind-the-scenes" look at the work of the Herbert Art Gallery & Museum.

Herbert Media works with established and specially developed community groups to produce multimedia responses to the galleries collections.
