= Bishop of Richmond =

The Bishop of Richmond may refer to:

- The Bishop of Richmond (suffragan), Church of England bishop.
- The Bishop of the Roman Catholic Diocese of Richmond, United States.
