= Henry Kaye (cricketer) =

English cricketer

Henry Wynyard Kaye (21 May 1875 – 21 April 1922) was an English first-class cricketer active 1900 who played for Middlesex. He was born in Westminster; died in Hatfield Peverel.

He was the brother of James Levett Kaye.

Kaye entered the London Hospital Medical College in 1900, having already passed the first MB exam at Magdalen College, Oxford that year. He qualified MRCS LRCP in October 1902, MB Oxon in June 1902, BS in December 1903 and MD in December 1904. He joined the Royal Army Medical Corps at the outbreak of WWI and was made a Captain in the 43rd Field Ambulance, 14th Division.

He married Amy Wigram in 1906. She was the sister of Army officers Clive Wigram, 1st Baron Wigram and Sir Kenneth Wigram, both of whom also played first-class cricket. One of Kaye's children was Martin Kaye, who would become a clergyman, ending as Archdeacon of Craven.
