= St Chad's Church, Far Headingley =

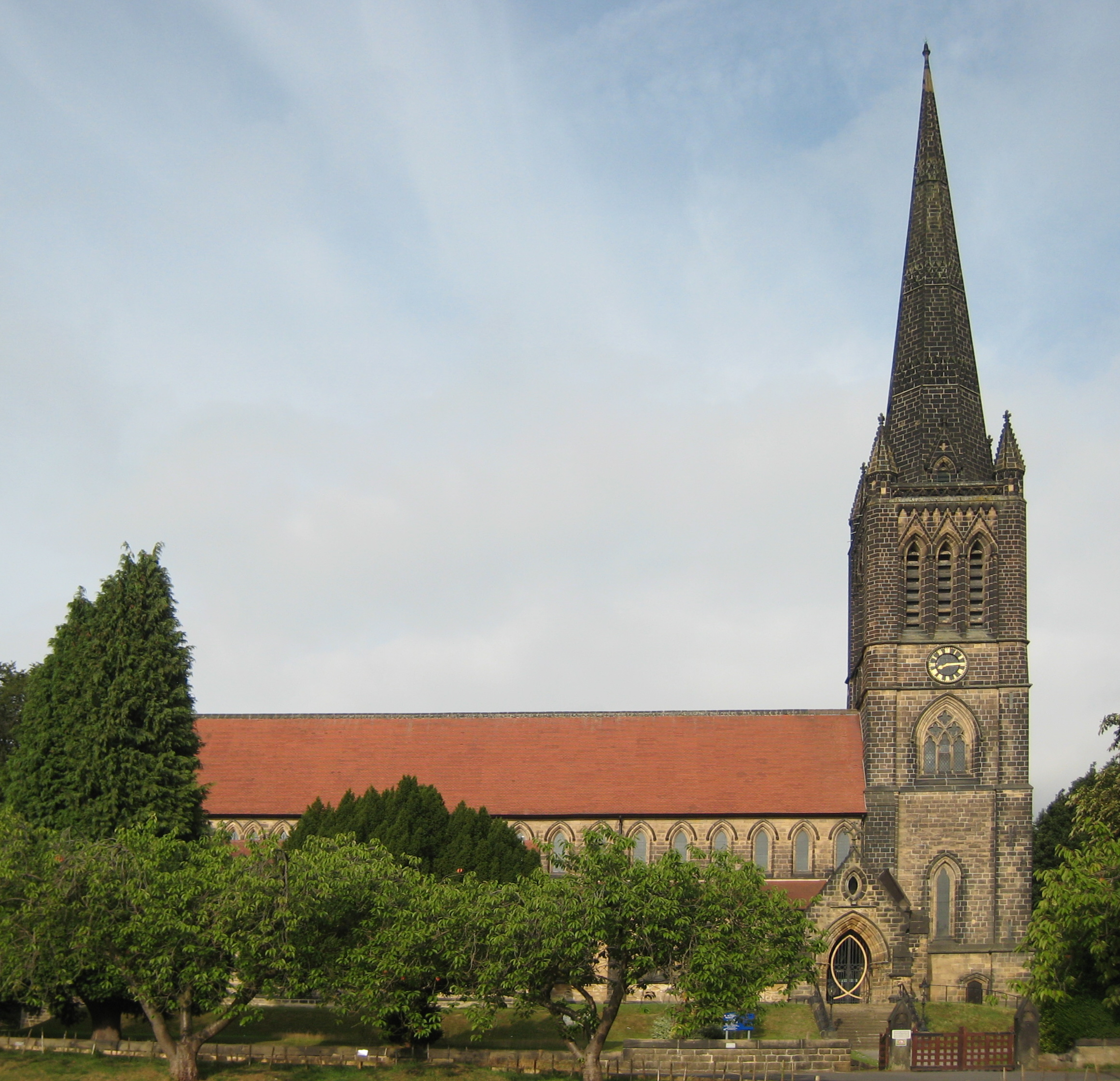
- View of church from the East

- Church location shown within West Yorkshire
- 53.8281°N 1.5860°W
- OS grid reference: SE 27335 36897
- Location: Otley Road, Far Headingley, Leeds, West Yorkshire, LS165JT
- Country: England
- Denomination: Church of England
- Churchmanship: Central/Liberal

History
- Status: Active
- Dedication: St Chad
- Consecrated: 1868

Architecture
- Functional status: Parish church
- Heritage designation: Grade II* listed
- Architect(s): Edmund Beckett Denison and W H Crossland
- Architectural type: Gothic Revival
- Completed: 1868, modified 1911
- Construction cost: £10,000

Administration
- Province: Province of York
- Diocese: Diocese of Leeds

Clergy
- Rector: The Revd Tony Whatmough
- Vicar: The Revd Hannah Lievesley

St Chad's Church, Far Headingley is the parish church of Far Headingley in Leeds, West Yorkshire, England. The church is Grade II* listed in Gothic Revival style. The dedication is to Chad of Mercia, who was bishop of York and died in AD 672. It is set back from the busy Otley Road, with a cricket field and the parish war memorial (Grade II listed) nearer the road.

== History ==
The church was built in 1868, on land given by the Beckett family of Kirkstall Grange who paid £10,000 towards it. The architects were Edmund Beckett Denison and W. H. Crossland. The spire is 186 feet (57 m) high.

In 1909-11 St Chad's Church was modified, removing the octagonal apse and replacing it with a rectangular chancel and adding a Lady chapel and an organ chamber to the sides. The organ by Harrison & Harrison of Durham was built to fit into the new space. It was rebuilt in 1988 with electric power and refurbished in 2011 when the interior of the church was reordered. The Creation window above the altar was designed and made by M. E. Aldrich Rope in 1922.

In 2002 the Lady Chapel was renamed the Chapel of St Oswald, when St Oswald's church in Meanwood closed. A glass partition was installed.

St Chad's won an "Eco-congregation" award, and in November 2007 the church won the Church Times national award for biodiversity in recognition of its wildlife-friendly churchyard.

== St Chad's Home for Girls ==
St Chad's Home for Girls was opened by the Church of England Central Home for Waifs and Strays in January 1889 at Glebe House, Hollin Lane, Far Headingley. A new home in Far Headingley for the girls was opened in December 1894 and a church service at St Chad's was conducted by the Bishop of Richmond to celebrate the event.

== Use in television ==
The church has been used on multiple occasions by Yorkshire Television as a filming location including for Fat Friends and At Home with the Braithwaites.

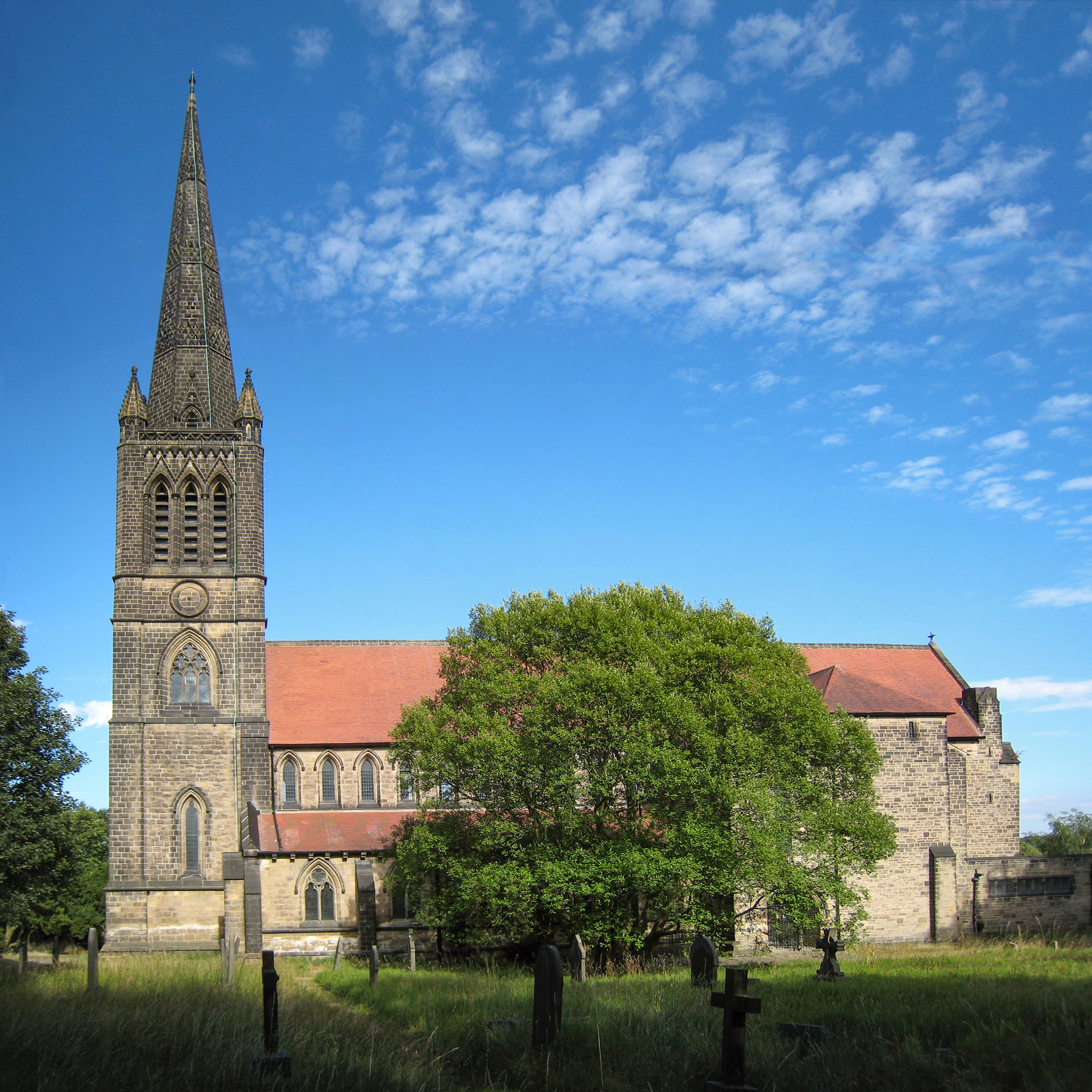
West side and graveyard

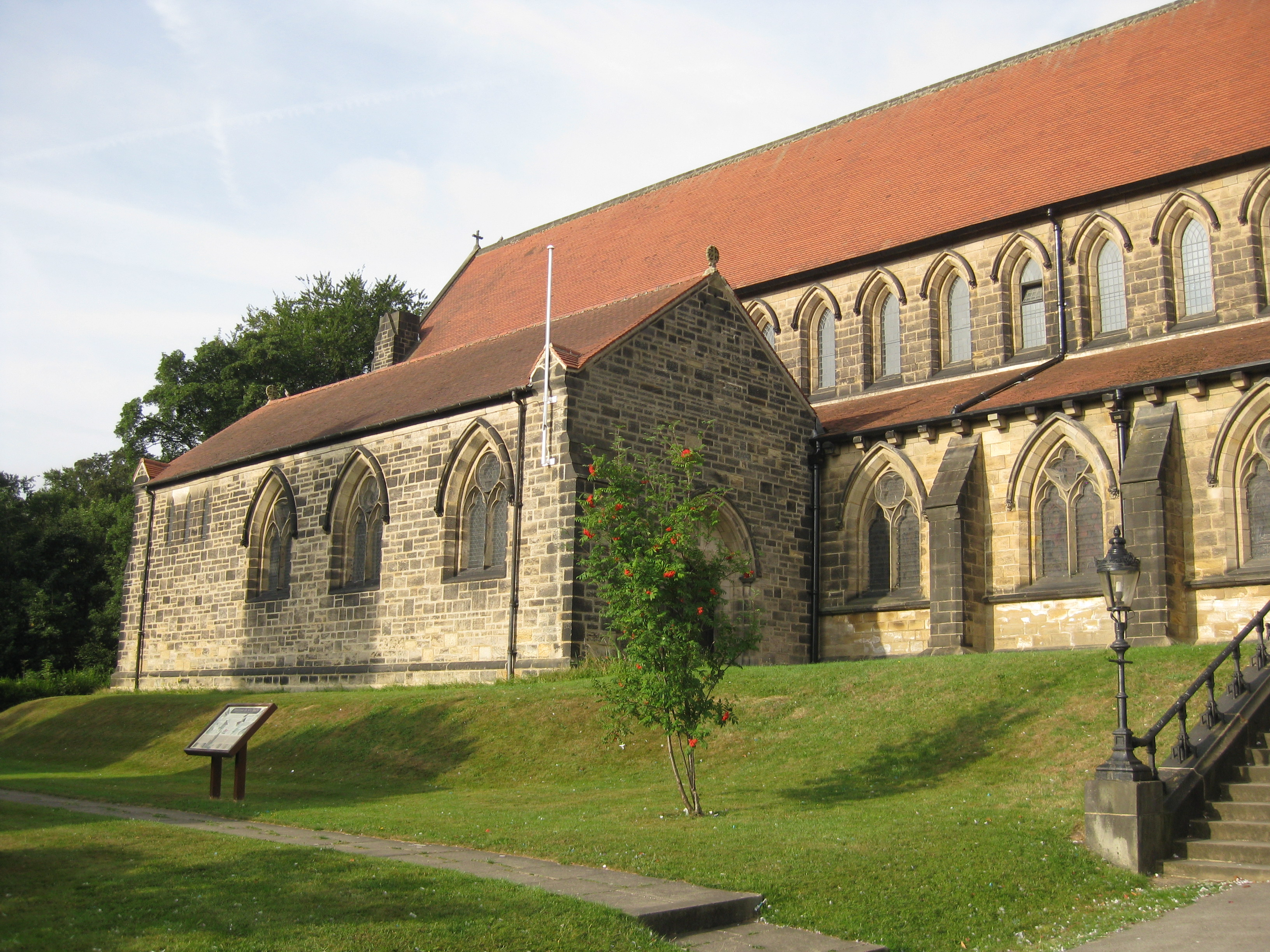
Lady chapel

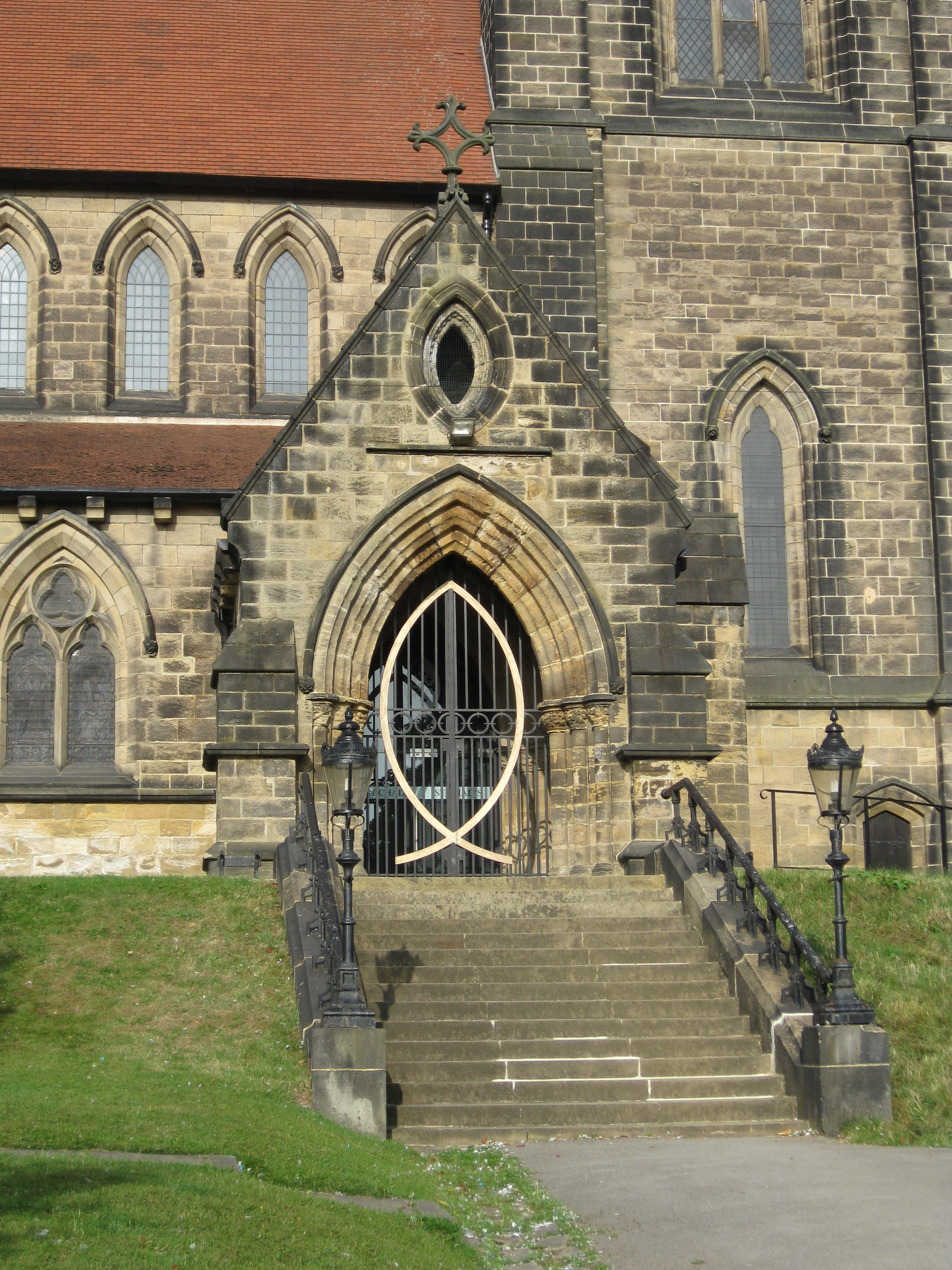
Porch and main door

Creation window

== See also ==
- Listed buildings in Leeds (Weetwood Ward)
