= Lucas Cook =

The Venerable Henry Lucas Cook MA

Archdeacon of Craven
- In office 1913–1928

Personal details
- Died: 16 May 1928
- Spouse: Eleanor Gertrude née Kendall

The Venerable Henry Lucas Cook was Archdeacon of Craven from 1913 to 1928.

Cook was educated at The King's School, Canterbury and Brasenose College, Oxford. After a curacy at All Saints, Bradford, he held incumbencies at St Mark's, Low Moor and Skipton before his years as an Archdeacon.

He died on 16 May 1928.
