= Spokesperson bishops in the Church of England =

Bishops with an episcopal role

Spokesperson bishops or lead bishops are bishops in the Church of England who, additionally to their see, have an episcopal role relating to a particular sector, situation or group of people.

== Bishops to His Majesty's Prisons ==
The Bishop to His Majesty's Prisons is an episcopal post relating to the church's chaplaincy to His Majesty's Prison Service.

The post has been held, alongside a diocesan or suffragan see, by at least five bishops:

- 1975–1985: John Cavell, Bishop of Southampton
- 1985: Br Michael (Fisher), Bishop of St Germans
- 1985–2001: Robert Hardy, Bishop of Maidstone until 1987, thereafter of Lincoln
- 2001–2007: Peter Selby, Bishop of Worcester
- 2007–2013: James Jones, Bishop of Liverpool
- 2013–2020: James Langstaff, Bishop of Rochester
- 2020–present: Rachel Treweek, Bishop of Gloucester

== Bishops for Urban Life and Faith ==
The Bishop for Urban Life and Faith is an episcopal post relating to the church's outreach into urban communities.

The post has been held, alongside a diocesan or suffragan see, by two bishops since its 2006 creation:

- 2006–2009: Stephen Lowe, Bishop of Hulme
- 2009–present: Christopher Chessun, Bishop of Woolwich then of Southwark

== Bishops for Higher and Further Education ==
- 2013–2021: Tim Dakin, Bishop of Winchester
- 2021–present: Christopher Cocksworth, Bishop of Coventry

== Lead bishops on healthcare issues ==
On 20 October 2010, it was announced that James Newcome, Bishop of Carlisle had been appointed lead bishop on healthcare issues.

== Lead bishops for religious communities ==
David Walker, Bishop of Dudley then of Manchester has been Chair of the Advisory Council on the Relations of Bishops and Religious Communities since before November 2012; as such he is described as lead bishop for religious communities.

== Lead bishops for safeguarding ==
- 2010 – 2016: Paul Butler
- 2016 – February 2020: Peter Hancock
- March 2020 – March 2023: Jonathan Gibbs
- April 2023 – March 2026: Joanne Grenfell
- April 2026 – present: Robert Springett

Deputy lead bishops for safeguarding

- April 2022 – present: Julie Conalty
- January 2024 – March 2026: Robert Springett

== Lead bishops for Living in Love and Faith ==
The following have been lead bishops for the Living in Love and Faith process:

- 2020 – 2023: Sarah Mullally
- 2023 : Philip Mounstephen
- November 2023 – February 2024: Helen-Ann Hartley
- November 2023 – June 2025: Martyn Snow
- June 2025 onwards: unfilled

== Lead bishops for racial justice ==
- March 2025 – present: Arun Arora
- March 2025 – present: Rosemarie Mallett

== Chairs of the CMDDP ==
On 19 April 2013, it was announced that Nick Holtam, Bishop of Salisbury had been appointed Chair of the Committee for Ministry of and among Deaf and Disabled People (CMDDP). By 2020, Richard Atkinson, Bishop of Bedford, had taken over as Chair.
