= Arthur Sephton =

Archdeacon of Craven from 1956 to 1972

Arthur Sephton (25 March 1894 – 22 March 1982) was a Church of England priest who was Archdeacon of Craven from 1956 to 1972.

== Early life ==
Sephton was born in 1894 in Newport Pagnell, the son of Thomas G and Laura Sephton.

He emigrated to Australia in 1914, and was a teacher at Monaro Grammar School in Cooma (which subsequently moved to Canberra and became Canberra Grammar School). He was a Gunner in the 29th Field Artillery Brigade, Australian Imperial Force, in WWI.

== Career ==
Educated at Christ Church, Oxford, Sephton trained for ordination at Cuddesdon. He was ordained deacon in 1921 and priest in 1922. He served his title at St Mary Redcliffe, Bristol (1921-24), but with a period at St Saviour's Cathedral, Goulburn (1922-23), where he was ordained priest. He served three further curacies: St Luke Woodside, Croydon (1924-25), St John the Baptist's Church, Hove (1925-28), and Christ Church, Harrogate (1928-29).

He was then successively Vicar of Holmfirth (1929-33), Vicar of All Hallows, Kirkburton (1933-43), and Rector of Holy Trinity Church, Skipton (1943-64). In 1944 he was made an Honorary Canon of Bradford Cathedral; in 1956 he was collated as Archdeacon of Craven, and held both offices until he retired in 1972.

== Personal life ==
Sephton married Unita Catherine Richards in 1924. There was one adopted daughter. He died in 1982, aged 87.
