= Archdeacon of Craven =

Former ecclesiastical post in Yorkshire, England

The Archdeacon of Craven was a senior ecclesiastical officer within the Diocese of Bradford. The final archdeacon was Paul Slater.

As an Archdeacon, they were responsible for the disciplinary supervision of the clergy within four area deaneries: Bowland, Ewecross, Skipton and South Craven. The archdeaconry was erected, part of the new Diocese of Ripon, on 5 October 1836 by Order in Council under the Established Church Act 1836 and transferred to the Diocese of Bradford upon that diocese's creation on 25 November 1919. Upon the creation of the Diocese of Leeds on 20 April 2014, the archdeaconry was dissolved and its territory added to the Richmond archdeaconry; Slater was automatically transferred (by the legislation) to the newly-renamed post of Archdeacon of Richmond and Craven.

== List of archdeacons ==
- 30 December 1836 – 17 April 1875 (d.): Charles Musgrave (first archdeacon)
- 1875–1880 (res.): Vincent Ryan
- 1880–1893: William Boyd
- 1893–1896 (d.): Joseph Bardsley
- 1896–1913 (res.): Francis Kilner (became Bishop suffragan of Richmond)
- 1913–1928 (d.): Lucas Cook

On 25 November 1919, the archdeaconry was transferred to the new Bradford diocese.

- 1928–1934 (d.): James Howson
- 1934–1949 (ret.): Frederick Ackerley
- 1949–4 July 1956 (d.): Thomas Williams
- 1956–1972 (ret.): Arthur Sephton (afterwards archdeacon emeritus)
- 1972–16 June 1977 (d.): Martin Kaye
- 1977–1986 (ret.): David Rogers
- 1987–1993 (res.): Brian Smith
- 1994–2005 (ret.): Malcolm Grundy
- 2005 – 20 April 2014: Paul Slater (became Archdeacon of Richmond and Craven)
