= Listed buildings in Leeds (Weetwood Ward) =

Weetwood is a ward in the metropolitan borough of the City of Leeds, West Yorkshire, England. It contains 78 listed buildings that are recorded in the National Heritage List for England. Of these, four are listed at Grade II*, the middle of the three grades, and the others are at Grade II, the lowest grade. The ward is to the northwest of the centre of Leeds, and includes the suburbs of Far Headingley, Ireland Wood, Tinshill, Weetwood and West Park. It is mainly residential, and most of the listed buildings are houses, some large and divided into smaller units, with associated structures. The ward also includes Leeds Beckett University, many of whose buildings are listed. The other listed buildings include a column originally in a church, shops, a public house, a horse trough, churches, a meter house, a former hospital, a post box, and a war memorial.

== Key ==
Grade	Criteria
II*	Particularly important buildings of more than special interest
II	Buildings of national importance and special interest

== Buildings ==
Name and location	Photograph	Date	Notes	Grade
Weetwood Hall; 53.83783°N 1.59139°W		1625	A large house, later much extended into a hotel, it is in gritstone, with moulded string courses, an eaves band, and a hipped slate roof. There are three storeys, a part cellar, seven bays on the front, and three on the sides. On the front is an entrance with a moulded quoined surround, a lintel with a carved shield, a string course, and a datestone. Surrounding this are thin Ionic columns on pedestals, and an entablature with a dentilled cornice. The windows are sashes with plain surrounds. At the rear is a mullioned and transomed window. In the left return is a porch with attached Ionic columns, the date and initials, and to its right is a bay window. The right return contains a full-height bay window, and the ground floor projects with a moulded parapet, and at the right end is a gate pier and an octagonal room.	II*
The Farm; 53.83405°N 1.58310°W		17th century	The farmhouse, later altered and a private house, is rendered and has a stone slate roof. There are two storeys, two bays, and a rear outshut. In the centre is a 20th-century porch, to the right is a four-light mullioned window in each floor, to the left are sash windows, and above the door is an inserted window.	II
Column, Meanwood Park; 53.83151°N 1.57624°W		c. 1672	The column, originally in Mill Hill Unitarian Chapel, was erected on its present site in about 1847. It is in gritstone, and consists of a Doric column on a square plinth and a moulded pedestal. On the south front of the pedestal is an inscribed bronze plaque.	II
Clayton House; 53.84061°N 1.61025°W		Mid 18th century	A house with the main part added in the early 19th century, it is in gritstone, the original part is rendered, and it has stone slate roofs and two storeys. The original part has two bays, and contains a doorway, a two-light mullioned window, and sash windows. The later part is taller with three bays and coped gables, and it contains a central doorway with a plain surround and a fanlight, and sash windows.	II
The Grange; 53.82582°N 1.59423°W		1752	A country house, it was designed by James Paine, and later altered and used for other purposes. The house is in gritstone, with a modillion cornice, and blue slate roofs with a lead-covered dome. The main block has three storeys and fronts of five and three bays, to the left is a two-storey two-bay wing, and above the ground floor of all bays are balustraded parapets. The main block has a pediment with a coat of arms in a recessed round arch containing the upper floor windows. In the centre is a porch with Ionic columns carrying an entablature, flanked by canted bay windows with round-headed sash windows. In the middle floor is a central Venetian window in a moulded architrave with a pediment, and the outer bays contain sash windows with architraves and pediments. The top floor contains sash windows, the middle window with a cornice. In the left wing and the right return are canted bay windows.	II*
Holly Dene; 53.82484°N 1.58038°W		Late 18th century	A parsonage, later used for other purposes, it is in gritstone, with quoins, and a slate roof. There are two storeys, three bays, and a taller added wing to the right with a hipped roof and a sill band. On the front is a porch, and most of the windows are sashes.	II
Stables, Weetwood Hall; 53.83815°N 1.59117°W		Late 18th century	The stables and coach house, later converted into a public house, are in gritstone, with quoins, and a stone slate roof. There are two storeys and three bays, the middle bay projecting under a pedimented gable with coping and kneelers. This bay contains double round-arched carriage entrances with impost blocks and keystones, with inserted doorways, and above is a narrow Venetian window. The outer bays contain doorways, and at the rear are round and segmental-arched double doors.	II
Shaw House; 53.82545°N 1.57736°W		Early 19th century	A house that was later extended, it is in gritstone, with a sill band on moulded brackets, an eaves band, and a hipped slate roof. There are two storeys, three bays, and an added bay on the left. In the centre is a porch and a doorway that has a fanlight with a moulded surround, a cornice, and a shallow pediment. This is flanked by canted bay windows with a moulded cornice, and in the upper floor are sash windows with plain surrounds.	II
151 Otley Road; 53.82551°N 1.58167°W		c. 1830	A former lodge, it is in stone, and has overhanging eaves, a stone slate roof, and gables with ornate bargeboards. There is one storey and an attic, and an irregular plan. On the front is a gabled porch with a four-centred arch, a hood mould and a shield, and on the right return is a bay window. At the rear is a tall chimney with an embattled cap.	II
2 and 4 Weetwood Lane and 2 and 3 Back Bailey's Place; 53.82780°N 1.58232°W		1831	A terrace of shops, later extended, in gritstone, with a stone slate roof, and two storeys. Facing Weetwood Lane are four bays, in the ground floor are shop fronts with pilasters and fascia boards on brackets, and in the upper floor are sash windows. On Back Bailey's Place are three bays, and on the left is a two-storey cottage containing a doorway with tie-stone jambs.	II
4–7 Ellis Terrace; 53.82837°N 1.58079°W		1831–50	A terrace of four houses in gritstone with a slate roof, two storeys and five bays. Towards the left is a round-arched passage with voussoirs. The houses are mirror-imaged in pairs, with outer doorways and sash windows.	II
46 Cottage Road; 53.82715°N 1.57969°W		1834 (probable)	A gritstone house with a hipped slate roof, two storeys and three bays. The central doorway has a fanlight, and is flanked by canted bay windows. The other windows are sashes, and at the rear is a central round-headed stair window.	II
Stables, wall and gate piers, 46 Cottage Road; 53.82726°N 1.57962°W		1834	The stable is in gritstone with a hipped slate roof, two storeys and two bays. On the front is a cast iron coal shute and small windows, and on the right return is a datestone. The attached wall is about 2 metres (6 ft 7 in) high and 15 metres (49 ft) long, it has round coping, and is ramped down to the monolithic gate piers that have pyramidal capstones.	II
5 Moor Road; 53.82821°N 1.58174°W		c. 1835	A pair of cottages, later combined into one house, it is in gritstone, and has a slate roof with a coped gable on the right. There are two storeys and two bays. Originally with a mirror image, the left doorway has been converted into a window. The doorway on the right has a plain surround, and the windows are casements.	II
Gate piers, St Chads' Drive; 53.82583°N 1.58709°W		c. 1835	There are two pairs of gate piers, square, and in gritstone. The inner pair are about 4 metres (13 ft) high and the outer piers are about 3 metres (9.8 ft) high. Each pier has a moulded plinth, a rusticated shaft, an entablature with roundels, a cornice, and a banded ball finial.	II
Former lodge, The Grange; 53.82794°N 1.59122°W		1838	The former lodge is in gritstone, with a moulded sill band, and a stone slate roof with coped gables, kneelers, and banded pyramid finials. There is one storey and an attic, and a front of three bays. The middle bay projects under a gable, and contains a doorway with a moulded surround, a dated and initialled lintel, and a hood mould, and above is a diamond window. The outer bays contain three-light mullioned windows with hood moulds, and there are later dormers.	II
Castle Grove Masonic Hall; 53.82850°N 1.57837°W		1839	A large house, later extended and used for other purposes, it is in gritstone with a slate roof. There are two storeys, the original range has three bays, with later extensions of two bays to the right and four to the left. The original range has a central Tuscan porch flanked by canted bay windows. The windows in the ground floor of the extensions have round arched heads, and at the top of all parts are balustrades, those over the extensions with urns. On the roof is a lead-covered dome.	II
17 Cottage Road; 53.82717°N 1.58102°W		c. 1840	A house in gritstone with a slate roof, two storeys and three bays. The central doorway has a fanlight and a cornice, and the windows are sashes.	II
Victoria Buildings; 53.82828°N 1.58203°W		1841	A corner shop and offices in gritstone with a slate roof. There are three storeys, fronts of two bays, and an angled bay on the corner. The central doorway on the front has a fanlight, and to the left and in the left return are shop windows. There is another doorway in the angled bay, above which is a blind window with an inscribed and dated lintel. The other windows are sashes.	II
Gate piers and wall, 151 Otley Road; 53.82546°N 1.58160°W		Mid 19th century	The gate piers and linking wall are in stone. The wall, which has moulded copings, extends for about 20 metres (66 ft), and the piers are about 2.5 metres (8 ft 2 in) high. The pier at the south end is square and rusticated, and has a cornice and a capstone. The north and central piers are octagonal and tapering, with stepped moulding, a deep cornice and a ball finial.	II
3 Weetwood Lane; 53.82788°N 1.58253°W		Mid 19th century	A gritstone house with eaves brackets, and a slate roof with coped gables. There are two storeys and a cellar, and three bays. The central doorway is recessed, approached by steps, and has pilasters and a shallow pedimented hood, and the windows are sashes.	II
Fox and Hounds Public House; 53.84790°N 1.62958°W		Mid 19th century	A house, later a public house, in gritstone with wide eaves and a slate roof. There are two storeys, and three bays, the left bay projecting and gabled. In the centre is a gabled porch with a four-centred arch, and the windows are casements.	II
Horse trough 53.82573°N 1.58160°W		Mid 19th century	The horse trough by the side of Otley Road is in cast iron. It is about 2 metres (6 ft 7 in) long, it is divided into two sections, and has segmental ends. A grille has been added on the west side.	II
Wall and gate piers, Shaw House; 53.82518°N 1.57711°W		Mid 19th century	The wall and gate piers are in gritstone. The wall is about 1 metre (3 ft 3 in) high and 20 metres (66 ft) long, with wooden gates at each end. The gate piers are square, with panelled fronts and pyramidal caps.	II
Stables, The Grange; 53.82611°N 1.59496°W		Mid 19th century	The former coach house and stables, later used for other purposes, are in gritstone, with quoins, paired eaves brackets, and a hipped stone slate roof. There are two storeys and a symmetrical front of nine bays. The central bay has a pediment with a ball finial, and contains a round carriage arch infilled with a doorway and windows, above which is a small round-headed window. Elsewhere are sash windows, some tripartite, and at the rear is a two-storey bay window.	II
Victoria Terrace, walls and gates 53.82628°N 1.58123°W		Mid 19th century	A terrace of eight stone houses, with a band, a moulded cornice, and a slate roof, hipped at the ends. There are two storeys and attics, and 15 bays. The doorways have moulded surrounds, segmental-arched fanlights, and a cornice on deep shaped brackets. The windows are round-arched, and paired in the ground floor. The boundary wall has round coping, it is about 1.5 metres (4 ft 11 in) high, and extends for about 25 metres (82 ft). The wall contains two gateways with square piers, each with a modillion cornice and a pyramidal capstone.	II
Balmoral Terrace; 53.82564°N 1.57529°W		c. 1857	A terrace of three gritstone houses, with sill bands, bracketed eaves, and hipped slate roofs. There are two storeys, and on the front, each house has a doorway with pilasters and a bracketed hood, and the windows are sashes with moulded surrounds. At the rear, each house has a central doorway and a stair window, one house has a canted bay window, and another has a square bay window.	II
22–28 Cottage Road; 53.82696°N 1.58079°W		c. 1860	A terrace of four gritstone houses with a slate roof. There are two storeys, and each house has two bays. The doorways in the left bays have fanlights, and the windows are sashes.	II
23–29 Cottage Road; 53.82744°N 1.58027°W		c. 1860	A terrace of four cottages in gritstone with quoins, a sill band, and a Welsh blue slate roof. There are two storeys, the doorways, which have fanlights, and windows, have plain surrounds, and some cottages have porches.	II
30 Cottage Road and 2–8 Heathfield Terrace; 53.82695°N 1.58045°W		c. 1860	A terrace of four houses, and a former shop on the right, in gritstone with a stone slate roof and two storeys. Each house has a doorway with a fanlight. No. 2 has casement windows, and in the other houses the windows are sashes. Between Nos. 2 and 4 is a flat cart archway with rusticated voussoirs, and above it is a cast iron plaque. The former shop has a doorway in the corner.	II
6–12 Monk Bridge Road; 53.82595°N 1.57382°W		c. 1860	A terrace of five gritstone houses with an embattled eaves parapet, and a slate roof with coped gables. There are two storeys and five bays. The doorways have rectangular fanlights and cornices on console brackets, and the windows are casements, those in the ground floor with hood moulds.	II
11 and 13 Monk Bridge Road; 53.82594°N 1.57218°W		c. 1860	A pair of gritstone houses with gutter brackets, and a slate roof with coped gables. There are two storeys, each house has two bays, a doorway with a fanlight in the right bay, and sash windows.	II
1A Moor Road; 53.82826°N 1.58188°W		c. 1860	A chapel, later an office, it is in gritstone with a slate roof, and is in Gothic Revival style. There is one storey and three bays. The central doorway has a pointed arch and a hood mould, and the windows are paired lancets.	II
23–29 Shaw Lane and wall 53.82627°N 1.57536°W		c. 1860	A terrace of four houses in gritstone, with a sill band, and a slate roof with two pairs of coped gables. There are two storeys and five bays. The doorways have fanlights and cornices on console brackets. In the ground floor are French windows with chamfered surrounds and hood moulds, and one house has a canted bay window with sashes. The boundary wall has pointed coping, it is about 1.2 metres (3 ft 11 in) high, and 80 metres (260 ft) long. Each house has a pair of square banded gate piers, each with a pyramidal capstone.	II
Bardon Grange Lodge; 53.83610°N 1.58353°W		1860	The lodge is in stone with a sill band, an eaves band, moulded eaves rising over the upper floor windows, and a hipped slate roof. There are two storeys, and a square plan with sides of two bays. The entrance has a round arch and a moulded surround, the ground floor windows have round arches and carved lintels, and the upper floor windows have splayed architraves.	II
Claremount, walls and gates 53.82490°N 1.57178°W	—	c. 1860	A terrace of seven houses in gritstone with slate roofs, and two storeys. The doorways have cornices on console brackets, and the windows are sashes. The boundary wall has round copings, it is about 1 metre (3 ft 3 in) high, and 50 metres (160 ft) long. Each house has a pair of gate piers with moulded capstones.	II
Lodge, walls and gate piers, Oxley Hall; 53.83618°N 1.58643°W		1860–64	The lodge is in gritstone with quoins, and a grey slate roof with Dutch gables. There are two storeys and attics, and a cruciform plan. The doorways and windows, which are sashes, have plain surrounds. Attached to the west is a curved wall about 1.5 metres (4 ft 11 in) high, with inner and outer pairs of gate piers, each with banded rustication, a cornice, and a banded ball finial.	II
Bardon Grange; 53.83579°N 1.58432°W		c. 1861	A large house, later a hall of residence, it is in stone on a moulded plinth, with a string course and a sill band, bracketed eaves, and a hipped grey slate roof. There are two storeys and five bays, the right bay slightly recessed. The round-arched doorway has a moulded architrave, and it is flanked by full-height canted bay windows. The other windows are sashes with moulded architraves.	II
Coach house, stables and wall, Bardon Grange; 53.83598°N 1.58457°W		1861	The building, later used for other purposes, is in stone, and has a grey slate roof with red ridge tiles. There are two storeys and an L-shaped plan. In the main range, the openings have segmental-arched heads, and include the coach house entrance, doorways and windows. In the upper floor are two circular windows, with the eaves rising over them as pediments. On the roof is a ventilator with an ogee roof and an ornate wind vane. At the northeast is a single-storey bay linked to the house by a wall about 2 metres (6 ft 7 in) high, with taller square gate piers, each with a moulded cornice and a ball finial.	II
Weetwood Grove and Weetwood Grange; 53.84115°N 1.58360°W		1861	A large house later extended and divided into flats, it is in gritstone, with a modillion eaves cornice, and a slate roof with three stepped coped gables and finials. There are two storeys and attics, the main block has fronts of two and three bays, and a parallel rear wing refaced in timber cladding, and a linking angle turret with an octagonal roof. In the centre of the main front is a porch that has columns with carved capitals, cusped arches, a moulded pediment, a finial and a gargoyle. To the right is a canted bay window with ornate crenellation. In the gables are rose windows and lancets, and the other windows include sashes, cross windows and an oriel window. At the rear is an entrance with a Tudor arch, mullioned and transomed windows, and a panelled parapet.	II
Oxley Hall and terrace walls 53.83580°N 1.58750°W		1861–64	A large house in Jacobean style, later altered and extended, and in 1926–28 converted into a hall of residence. It is in gritstone, with elaborate pierced parapets, and a grey slate roof with Dutch gables and finials. There are two storeys and attics, and an irregular plan, with fronts of four and five bays. The doorway has pilasters, a moulded round arch with a keystone and a cornice, and the windows are mullioned and transomed. In the left return is a square tower with bracketed eaves, and a splayed roof with wrought iron cresting and a wind vane. Other features include a bay window and an oriel window. At the rear is a small courtyard enclosed by a low wall with railings, and piers with short obelisk finials, and at the front is a terrace that has walls with a pierced parapet, and steps with balustrades and vases.	II
Fox Hill Cottage, walls and gates 53.83916°N 1.58519°W		c. 1862	Originally a lodge designed by George Corson in Gothic Revival style, it is in gritstone with a slate roof. There is one storey and an upper floor in the roof. In the front facing the drive is a round-arched doorway, a rectangular bay window, and a dormer in the gable above. The front facing the road has three-light mullioned windows and a gable dormer. The chimney is prominent, with four embattled circular shafts, and there is a circular stair turret with a conical roof and a finial. Attached are curving walls with railings, and inner and outer pairs of gate piers, the inner pair with cornices and banded ball finials.	II
Coach house and stables, Oxley Hall; 53.83612°N 1.58738°W		c. 1865	The building is in gritstone, with quoins, a chamfered eaves cornice, and a hipped slate roof. There is a single storey, and the central bay is taller with a truncated pyramidal roof. It contains a doorway with a chamfered surround and a fanlight, it is flanked by windows, and above it is a round-arched loading door, and a shaped gable with two circular windows. The outer bays contain carriage arches.	II
1–14 Woodbine Terrace; 53.82474°N 1.57355°W		1867–70	A terrace of 14 houses that was later extended, it is in gritstone with quoins and Welsh slate roofs. There are two storeys, and each house has two bays, a doorway with a fanlight approached by steps, and a canted bay window in the ground floor, and sash windows above. The doorways and windows have segmental-arched heads, and some steps have iron balustrades.	II
Old Block, Cookridge Hospital; 53.84630°N 1.61561°W		1868	The former hospital was designed by Richard Norman Shaw in Vernacular Revival style. It has a ground floor in red brick on a stone plinth, the upper floor and gables are tile-hung, and the roof is slated. There are 15 bays, three bays project and are gabled with three storeys, and the other have two storeys. In the top floor of the gabled bays are large oriel windows on deep brackets, and the other bays have gabled eaves dormers. Most of the windows are mullioned and transomed.	II
Lodge, Cookridge Hospital; 53.84630°N 1.61385°W		1868	The former lodge was designed by Richard Norman Shaw in Vernacular Revival style. It has a ground floor in red brick on a stone plinth, the upper floor and gables are tile-hung, and the roof is tiled. There are two storeys and an attic, and on the entrance front the upper storey is jettied on deep wooden brackets. The windows are mullioned, above the entrance is an oriel window, and in the returns are gabled half-dormers.	II
Post box, Cookridge Hospital; 53.84619°N 1.61432°W	—	c. 1868	The post box is in cast iron and set in a stone surround. The surround is on a chamfered plinth, and has a gabled top and a moulded ridge. Above the posting aperture is "VR" and a crown, and below it is a door.	II
St Chad's Church, Far Headingley; 53.82767°N 1.58622°W		1868	The church was designed by Edmund Beckett Denison and W. H. Crossland, and the chancel was replaced and the Lady chapel and organ chamber were added in 1910. The church is built in gritstone with red tile roofs, and consists of a nave with a clerestory, aisles, a porch, a chancel with a Lady chapel, and a steeple. The steeple has a tower with three stages, a clock face, pinnacles, and a slender octagonal spire.	II*
Shaw Grange; 53.82599°N 1.57653°W		c. 1870	A large gritstone house with moulded string courses, an eaves parapet with semicircular gable pediments and ball finials, and a Welsh slate roof. There are two storeys and three bays, the left and middle bays slightly projecting. In the centre is a porch and a doorway with a fanlight, and a strapwork parapet, and the outer bays contain square bay windows. The upper floor has paired windows in the left bay, a cross window in the middle bay, and a single-light window in the right bay.	II
Bardon Hill; 53.83503°N 1.58635°W		1873–75	The large house, which was altered in about 1902, is in gritstone, with quoins, and a slate roof that has gables with elaborate pierced bargeboards and finials. There are two storeys, attics and cellars, a south front of four bays, an east front of three bays, and to the right is a single-storey bay that has a parapet with circular piercings. Each front has an entrance tower with three storeys; the south tower has a timber bellcote and a tall pyramidal spire, and the east tower has a pavilion roof. The windows are sashes and there are bay windows, some square and some canted.	II
Former coach house and stables, Bardon Hill; 53.83475°N 1.58808°W		1873–75	The building, later used for other purposes, has a ground floor in gritstone, the upper floor is timber framed, and the roof has red tiles. There are two storeys and a U-shaped plan. The ground floor openings have shallow pointed arched heads with voussoirs. Above is a moulded string course, and the upper floor includes gables. The area is closed by a low wall with wrought iron railings incorporating scrolled panels with Art Nouveau motifs, and the piers are rusticated. At the rear are external steps, and a wall with railings, and piers with ball finials.	II
Weetwood Manor; 53.83418°N 1.58498°W		c. 1875	A large house divided into flats, it is in gritstone with quoins and a blue slate roof. There are three storeys and fronts of three bays. The entrance is in a central projecting turret that has bracketed eaves and a tall spire with a lucarne. The doorway has a chamfered arch with carving in the tympanum, a hood mould, and two-light windows above. The bay to the right has sash windows, and a gable with carved bargeboards and a finial. In the right return is a gabled bay with a canted bay window, a narrower gabled bay to the right with a full-height square bay window, and between is a dormer.	II
Glebe House; 5, Shaw Lane; 53.82480°N 1.57912°W		Late 19th century	The house, later offices, is in gritstone, and has a slate roof, and gables with carved bargeboards. There are two storeys and three bays, the middle bay narrower, and the outer bays gabled. In the centre is a recessed door and a pointed arch with a hood mould, to the right is a bay window, and the windows are mullioned and transomed. The entrance arch and the windows have quoined jambs.	II
Gate piers and wall, Glebe House; 53.82434°N 1.57872°W	—	Late 19th century	The boundary wall is in gritstone, it is about 1 metre (3 ft 3 in) high, and extends for about 40 metres (130 ft). Towards the southwest end are a blocked gateway, and inner and outer pairs of gate piers about 2 metres (6 ft 7 in) high, each pier with a square base, a round shaft, incised bands, a conical capstone, and a bud finial.	II
Weetwood Hall Lodge; 53.83733°N 1.58466°W	—	Late 19th century	The lodge is in stone with moulded string courses, and a slate roof with coped gables and kneelers. There are two storeys and a square plan. The doorway has a Tudor arch and a stepped hood mould, some windows have single lights, others have three lights and mullions, and there is a canted bay window.	II
Spenfield; 53.83370°N 1.59134°W		1875–77	A large house, later offices, designed by George Corson in Gothic Revival style. It is in gritstone, with moulded string courses, and slate roofs with coped gables and bud finials. There are two storeys, attics and cellars, a front of three bays, a two-bay extension on the left, and a rear wing. In the centre is a porch with a pointed arch, pink granite columns, relief carving in the spandrels, and a parapet with roundels, initials and the date. To the sides are gargoyles, and above is a three-light window. The outer bays contain two-storey canted bay windows, attic windows, and quatrefoils. In the right return is a two-storey segmental bay window, and a projecting gabled bay. In the rear wing is a corner turret with a conical roof and an ornate finial.	II*
Coach House and wall, Spenfield; 53.83331°N 1.59240°W		1875–77	The coach house and stables, later an office, is in gritstone with shaped wooden gutter brackets, and a blue slate roof with crested ridge tiles. The main range has one and two storeys, and there is a single-storey range at right angles with a circular turret at the south end. The coach house openings have been converted into windows, and there are sash windows in both floors. The boundary wall runs along the roadside.	II
Lodge, outbuilding, piers and wall, Spenfield; 53.83264°N 1.59085°W		c. 1877	The lodge is in gritstone, and has a grey slate roof with coped gables. There is a single storey and two bays. A projecting gabled bay contains a mullioned and transomed window, and to the left is a timber porch with a round arch, attached columns, a balustrade, and a ball finial. In the right return is a bay window. At the rear is an outbuilding with a pyramidal roof. A wall with rounded coping encloses the boundary and links the buildings, and contains gate piers, the inner pair octagonal, about 2.5 metres (8 ft 2 in) high, each with a plinth, a moulded band, and an ornate capstone.	II
Meanwood Methodist Church; 53.82813°N 1.56711°W		1881	The church, was designed by William Hill in Gothic Revival style, and extended by him in 1886. It is in local sandstone with a slate roof. The church consists of a nave with an entrance lobby, and has an octagonal buttressed turret with a stone spire. The entrance is in an arched recess with a round window in the tympanum. Above is a tall three-light wheel window flanked by lancet windows with quatrefoils, all under hood moulds.	II
114–120 Ilkley Road and wall 53.82889°N 1.58356°W		1885	A terrace of four houses in red brick and buff faience with a grey slate roof. There are two storeys, cellars and attics, each house has two bays, and there is a single-storey bay on the right. Each house has a doorway with a fanlight in a moulded round arch with a scrolled keystone, a window to the side, and a dormer at the top. The other bay contains a semicircular bay window with voussoirs and a patterned parapet with dragons and griffins in high relief. At the top of the bay is an elaborate scrolled gable with a segmental pediment and ball finials. All the windows are mullioned and transomed. Enclosing the front gardens is a low stone wall, and on the right return is a taller brick wall.	II
Lodge, Weetwood Hall; 53.83653°N 1.59319°W		1887 (probable)	The lodge is in gritstone and has a slate roof with coped gables. There are two storeys, and an L-shaped plan, and it is in Tudor style. In the angle is a lean-to porch with a chamfered pointed arch with a stepped hood mould. On the front is a bay window, and elsewhere are mullioned and transomed windows.	II
Gates, gate piers and walls, Lodge to Weetwood Hall; 53.83646°N 1.59328°W		1887	The double gates are in wrought iron and have ornate scrolls. The other structures are in gritstone; the octagonal gate piers are about 2 metres (6 ft 7 in) high, with carved details including a monogram and a crenellated design on the capstones. The curving walls have a plinth, parts have stepped ridged coping and raised panels with quatrefoil recesses, and part is plain.	II
Ida Convalescent Hospital; 53.84563°N 1.61417°W		c. 1890	The former hospital is in stone, partly rendered, with applied timber framing, and a slate roof, and it is in Arts and Crafts style. In the centre is a reception block with three storeys, three bays, and two gables. The middle bay contains a cambered arch, over which is an oriel window, and in the outer bays are cross windows in the ground floor. The top storey is jettied with five-light casement windows. Flanking the central block are angled single-storey wings, originally with open verandahs, now closed.	II
Oxley Croft; 53.83799°N 1.58448°W		1898	A large house, later a hall of residence, it is in gritstone on a chamfered plinth, and has a tile roof with gables. There are two storeys, cellars and an attic, and an L-shaped plan, with a three-bay entrance wing, and a four-bay rear range. The central porch has a moulded segmental arch and a parapet. The windows are mullioned or mullioned and transomed, and there are canted bay windows and paired dormers. On the garden front is an inscribed and dated sundial.	II
89 Weetwood Lane; 53.83476°N 1.58367°W		1902 (probable)	A lodge, later a private house, the ground floor is in gritstone, the upper floor is timber framed, and the roof has red tiles. There are two storeys, and fronts of one and two bays. In the front facing the drive is a gabled timber porch with a square bay window to the right, and above is an eaves dormer under a gable. The front facing the road has a bay window in each floor under a half-hipped roof. The central chimney stack has four cylindrical moulded flues.	II
Gate piers, gates, walls and bollards, 89 Weetwood Lane; 53.83469°N 1.58358°W		1902	The gates are in wrought iron and are elaborately decorated, including scrolled frames, a crest, and the date. The gate piers are rusticated, and each has a plinth, bulbous corner shafts, an entablature, a moulded cornice and flat capstones. The walls are in gritstone and are coped, and the bollards, which are about 0.7 metres (2 ft 4 in) high, are conical with flattened ball finials.	II
Water Works Meter House; 53.82993°N 1.58729°W		1905–12	The meter house is in stone with angle buttresses, a blocking course with arched recesses on moulded brackets, and a hipped grey slate roof with a glazed ventilation canopy and iron finials. In the centre is a porch with a pointed arch, a cornice, and a blocking course, flanked by two-light windows with pointed arches and hood moulds.	II
Bronte Hall, Leeds Beckett University; 53.82584°N 1.59124°W		1911	A hall of residence in red brick on a plinth, with stone dressings, a modillion cornice, and a hipped slate roof. There are three storeys and five unequal bays, the middle and outer bays projecting. The outer bays have rusticated quoins, and a triangular pediment containing a circular window, and the middle bay has corner pilasters and a segmental pediment. The central doorway has a traceried fanlight and a pedimented cornice. The windows are small-paned sashes, those in the ground floor in round-headed recesses, and the middle upper floor window has an elaborate architrave.	II
Caedmon Hall, Leeds Beckett University; 53.82700°N 1.59178°W		1911	A hall of residence in red brick on a plinth, with stone dressings, a band, a modillion cornice, and a hipped slate roof. There are three storeys and five unequal bays, the middle and outer bays projecting under pediments. The central doorway has an architrave, a three-light fanlight, and a segmental pediment, the windows above in a stone panel. The windows are sashes, most with keystones, and in the upper floors they are in round-arched recesses.	II
Cavendish Hall, Leeds Beckett University; 53.82632°N 1.59408°W		1911	A hall of residence in red brick on a plinth, the ground floor rusticated, with stone dressings, quoins, a band, a modillion cornice, and a hipped slate roof. There are three storeys and five unequal bays, the middle and outer bays projecting under pediments. The central doorway has attached fluted columns, an entablature with a triglyph frieze, and a modillion cornice. Above is a balustrade, and windows with architraves and keystones. The windows are small-paned sashes, those in the upper floors in round-arched recesses.	II
Fairfax Hall, Leeds Beckett University; 53.82698°N 1.59410°W		1911	A hall of residence in red brick on a plinth, the ground floor rusticated, with stone dressings, quoins, a band, a modillion cornice, and a hipped slate roof. There are three storeys and five unequal bays, the middle and outer bays projecting under pediments. The round-arched central doorway has a fanlight with Art Nouveau tracery, a keystone with a mask, and a cornice on console brackets. Above is a balustrade, and windows with architraves and keystones. The windows are small-paned sashes, those in the upper floors in round-arched recesses.	II
James Graham Hall, Leeds Beckett University; 53.82727°N 1.59293°W		1911	The main building of the university, it is in red brick with stone dressings, and a roof of slate and lead. There are three storeys, and a double courtyard plan, with a front of five unequal bays, the middle and outer bays with pilasters and pediments, and decorated with swags. In the centre is a porch with Ionic columns and a pedimented hood. Above, four Corinthian columns carry a triangular pediment. The windows are small-paned sashes or casements, those in the middle floor with segmental heads. The ground floor projects, the windows have round-arched heads, and above them are swags and a parapet with urns.	II
Leighton Hall, Leeds Beckett University; 53.82636°N 1.59176°W		1911	A hall of residence in red brick on a plinth, with stone dressings, a band, a modillion cornice, and a hipped slate roof. There are three storeys and five unequal bays, the middle and outer bays projecting under pediments. The central doorway has a rusticated architrave, a fanlight, and Ionic columns carrying an entablature and a cornice, the windows above in a stone panel. The windows are sashes, most with keystones, and in the upper floors they are in round-arched recesses.	II
Macauley Hall, Leeds Beckett University; 53.82637°N 1.59073°W		1911	A hall of residence in red brick on a plinth, with stone dressings, a band, a modillion cornice, and a hipped slate roof. There are three storeys and five unequal bays, the middle and outer bays projecting under pediments. The central doorway has a fanlight with a moulded surround and a moulded cornice. The windows are sashes, most with keystones, and in the upper floors they are in round-arched recesses.	II
Priestley Hall, Leeds Beckett University; 53.82699°N 1.59075°W		1911	A hall of residence in red brick on a plinth, with stone dressings, a band, a modillion cornice, and a hipped slate roof. There are three storeys and five unequal bays, the middle and outer bays are rusticated, and projecting under pediments. The central doorway is recessed, with paired pilasters, carved swags, a traceried fanlight, a triglyph frieze, a modillion cornice, and a blocking course. The windows are sashes, most with keystones, and in the upper floors they are in round-arched recesses.	II
South Lodge, St Chad's Drive; 53.82603°N 1.58712°W		c. 1911	The lodge is in red brick, with deep eaves, and a hipped slate roof. There are two storeys and an L-shaped plan. The doorway in the angle has a fanlight, and the windows are sashes with splayed brick flat arches.	II
War memorial 53.82780°N 1.58356°W		c. 1920	The war memorial is to the east of St Chad's Church in a garden of rest. It is in stone, and consists of a tall chamfered tapering cross on a base, a plinth, and octagonal steps. Behind it is a curved wall about 1 metre (3 ft 3 in) high, ending in piers about 2 metres (6 ft 7 in) high. On the south pier is a bronze plaque with an inscription and the names of those lost in the First World War, and on the north pier are the names of those lost in the Second World War.	II
