= Martin Kaye =

Church of England priest

Martin Kaye (15 May 1919 – 16 June 1977) was a Church of England priest who was Archdeacon of Craven from 1972 to 1977.

== Early life ==
Kaye was born in 1919, the son of Dr Henry Wynyard Kaye and his wife Amy (née Wigram). Amy Kaye was the sister of Army officers Clive Wigram, 1st Baron Wigram and Sir Kenneth Wigram. As a child, Kaye lived at Kilderry, Hatfield Peverel, Essex. His father died before his third birthday. Kaye was educated at Winchester College and Christ Church, Oxford.

== Career ==
Kaye trained for ordination at Cuddesdon, and was ordained deacon in 1948 and priest in 1949. He served his title at Grangetown (1948–51). He then returned to Cuddesdon, where he was Tutor (1951–53) and Chaplain (1953–56). After that he was Domestic Chaplain to the Archbishop of York (1956–60) (at the time, Michael Ramsey, subsequently Archbishop of Canterbury). He was then Assistant Secretary to the Central Advisory Council of Training for the Ministry (1961–67), after which he was Canon-residentiary at Norwich Cathedral (1967–72). He was then collated as Archdeacon of Craven in the Diocese of Bradford; he died in office in 1977. At the time of his death he was Canon-designate of St George's Chapel, Windsor Castle.

== Personal life ==
Kaye died in 1977, aged 58. He was unmarried.
