= James Kaye (cricketer) =

English cricketer (1861–1917)

Personal information
- Full name: James Levett Kaye
- Born: 27 December 1861; Potters Bar, Hertfordshire, England
- Died: 17 November 1917 (aged 55); Kensington, London, England
- Batting: Right-handed
- Role: Wicket-keeper
- Relatives: Henry Kaye (brother)

Domestic team information
- Years: Team
- 1881: Hampshire

Career statistics
Competition	First-class
Matches	1
Runs scored	14
Batting average	7.00
100s/50s	–/–
Top score	11
Catches/stumpings	–/1
- Source: Cricinfo, 22 January 2010

James Levett Kaye (27 December 1861 – 17 November 1917) was an English first-class cricketer and an officer in both the British Army and the British Indian Army.

The son of James Kaye and Elizabeth Thoroton, he was born at Potters Bar in December 1861. He was educated at Winchester College, playing for the college cricket team for three years, in addition to representing the college at racquets. From Winchester, Kaye proceeded to the Royal Military College, Sandhurst. He graduated from there into the Royal Berkshire Regiment as a lieutenant in September 1882. Prior to his graduation, he made a single appearance in first-class cricket for Hampshire against the Marylebone Cricket Club at Lord's in 1881. Playing as a wicket-keeper and opening batsman, he was dismissed for 3 runs in Hampshire's first innings by Wilfred Flowers, while in their second innings he was dismissed for 11 runs by Arnold Rylott; as wicket-keeper, he made a single stumping.

With the Berkshire Regiment, he served in both British Egypt and Gibraltar. He served in the Mahdist War in 1885, surviving the siege at Suakin, for which he was decorated with the Khedive's Star. Later in 1885, he joined the British Indian Army. He initially served in the 25th Punjabis and the 5th Bengal Cavalry, before being appointed to the Bengal Staff Corps in March 1887. Kaye transferred from active military service in 1889, joining the Indian Political Service (IPS); upon his appointment in the IPS, he volunteered with the 1st Central India Horse from 1890, in which promotion to captain came in September 1893 and major in July 1901. In the IPS, Kaye was appointed an assistant resident at Kashmir in 1892, later being appointed settlement commissioner at Jamona from 1895 to 1904. Further appointments to political officer at Alwar in December 1905, resident at Indore in 1907, and resident at Mewar from 1911 to 1916 followed.

Kaye returned to military service with the Censor's Department during the First World War, with him holding the rank of lieutenant colonel by 1916. He retired from active service on account of ill health in January 1917. Returning to England, he died at his residence in Kensington on 17 November 1917. His younger brother, Henry, was also a first-class cricketer, playing for Middlesex.
