= Arun Arora =

British Anglican priest and solicitor (born 1971)

The Right Reverend Arun Arora
- Bishop of Kirkstall
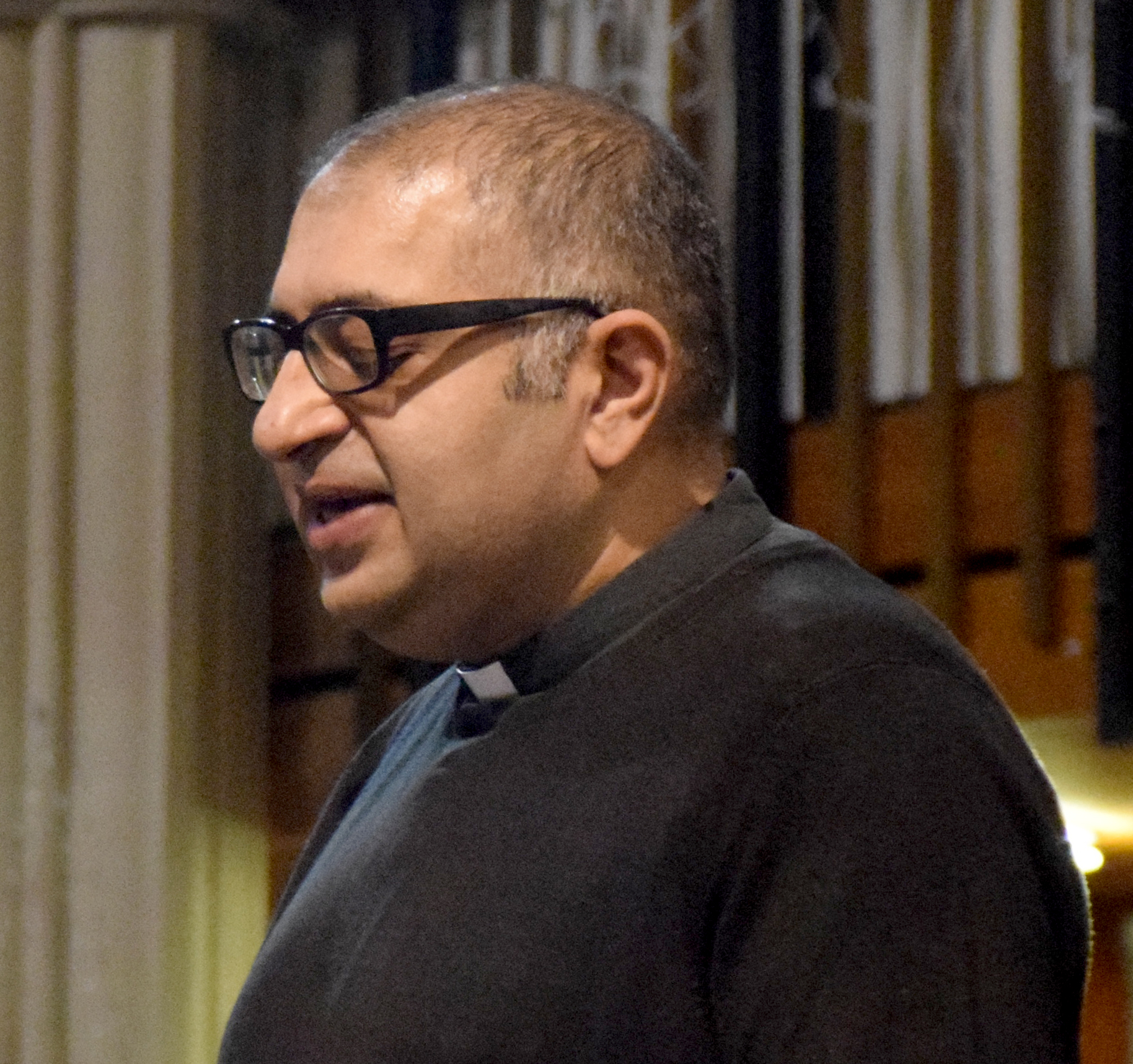
- Arora preaching at St Nicholas' Church, Durham in 2022
- Church: Church of England
- Diocese: Anglican Diocese of Leeds
- In office: 2022–present
- Other post: Lead bishop for racial justice (2025–present)

Orders
- Ordination: 2007 (deacon); 2008 (priest)
- Consecration: 15 July 2022 by Stephen Cottrell

Personal details
- Born: 10 October 1971 (age 54) Birmingham, England
- Spouse: Joanne (m. 2006)
- Children: 1
- Education: University of Birmingham; Cranmer Hall, Durham; University of Durham

Director of Communications Church of England
- In office September 2012 – April 2017
- Preceded by: Peter Crumpler
- Succeeded by: Tashi Lassalle

Arun Arora (born 10 October 1971) is a British Anglican bishop and solicitor. Since 2022 he has served as Bishop of Kirkstall in the Diocese of Leeds. From 2012 to 2017, he served as Director of Communications of the Archbishops' Council of the Church of England, then until 2022 as vicar of St Nicholas' Church, Durham.

== Early life ==
Arora was born on 10 October 1971 in Birmingham, England. His mother was a Hindu and his father a Sikh. He was educated at King Edward VI Five Ways School, a state grammar school in Birmingham. He studied law and politics at the University of Birmingham, graduating with a Bachelor of Laws (LLB) degree in 1993.

== Legal career ==
Arora's early career was in employment law. From 1996 to 2000, he worked with Thompsons Solicitors in Birmingham. After completing his training contract, he was admitted as a solicitor in 1998. He co-authored The Rule of Lawyers, which was published in 1998.

== Career in the Church of England ==
Arora then moved into working in public relations in the Church of England. From 2000 to 2004, he was the Diocesan Communications Officer of the Diocese of Birmingham and press officer for the Bishop of Birmingham.

From 2004 to 2007, he trained for ordained ministry at Cranmer Hall, Durham. During this time, he also studied theology at the University of Durham, and he graduated with a Bachelor of Arts (BA) degree in 2006.

In parallel with his studies and curacies, he was Director of Communications for the Archbishop of York from 2006 to 2009.

Arora was ordained in the Church of England as a deacon in 2007 and as a priest in 2008. He served his curacy at St Mark's Church, Harrogate in the then Diocese of Ripon and Leeds (now in the Ripon Episcopal Area of the Diocese of Leeds) between 2007 and 2010. From 2010 to 2012, he was a Team Leader of Wolverhampton Pioneer Ministries, a fresh expression of church aimed at young adults and run jointly by the Anglican and Methodist churches.

He was Director of Communications for the Archbishops’ Council of the Church of England from September 2012 to 7 April 2017, based at Church House in Westminster, London. From 2013 to 2017, he also held the position of public preacher in the Diocese of St Albans.

On 12 December 2016, Arora was announced as the next vicar of St Nicholas' Church, Durham in the Diocese of Durham. On 24 June 2017, he was instituted and inducted as vicar. From 2020 to 2021, he was co-chair of the Church of England's Anti-Racism Taskforce, and appeared in the 2021 Panorama episode "Is the Church Racist?". In April 2021, he was made an honorary canon of Durham Cathedral.

=== Episcopal ministry ===
On 27 May 2022, it was announced that Arora was to become suffragan Bishop of Kirkstall in the Diocese of Leeds. He was consecrated as a bishop by Stephen Cottrell during a service at York Minster on 15 July 2022. In March 2025, he was additionally appointed joint lead bishop for racial justice, alongside Rosemarie Mallett. As such, he is a deputy chair of the Racial Justice Board, a committee of the Archbishops' Council.

In January 2023, he was installed as an honorary canon of Ripon Cathedral.

=== Views ===
In November 2023, he was one of 44 Church of England bishops who signed an open letter supporting the use of the Prayers of Love and Faith (i.e. blessings for same-sex couples) and called for "Guidance being issued without delay that includes the removal of all restrictions on clergy entering same-sex civil marriages, and on bishops ordaining and licensing such clergy".

In 2025, in response to anti-immigration protests, he criticised the "narrow Christian nationalist ideology" that was being co-oped by the far-right, while also trying to promote a common ground between opposing sides.

== Personal life ==
In 2006, Arora married Joanne Logan. She is also an Anglican priest and is a tutor at the Lindisfarne College of Theology. Together they have one daughter.

Church of England titles
Preceded by Paul Slater	Bishop of Kirkstall; 2022 onwards	Bishop-designate
