= Rosemarie Mallett =

British Anglican priest and sociologist (born 1959)

The Right Reverend Dr Rosemarie Mallett
- Bishop of Croydon
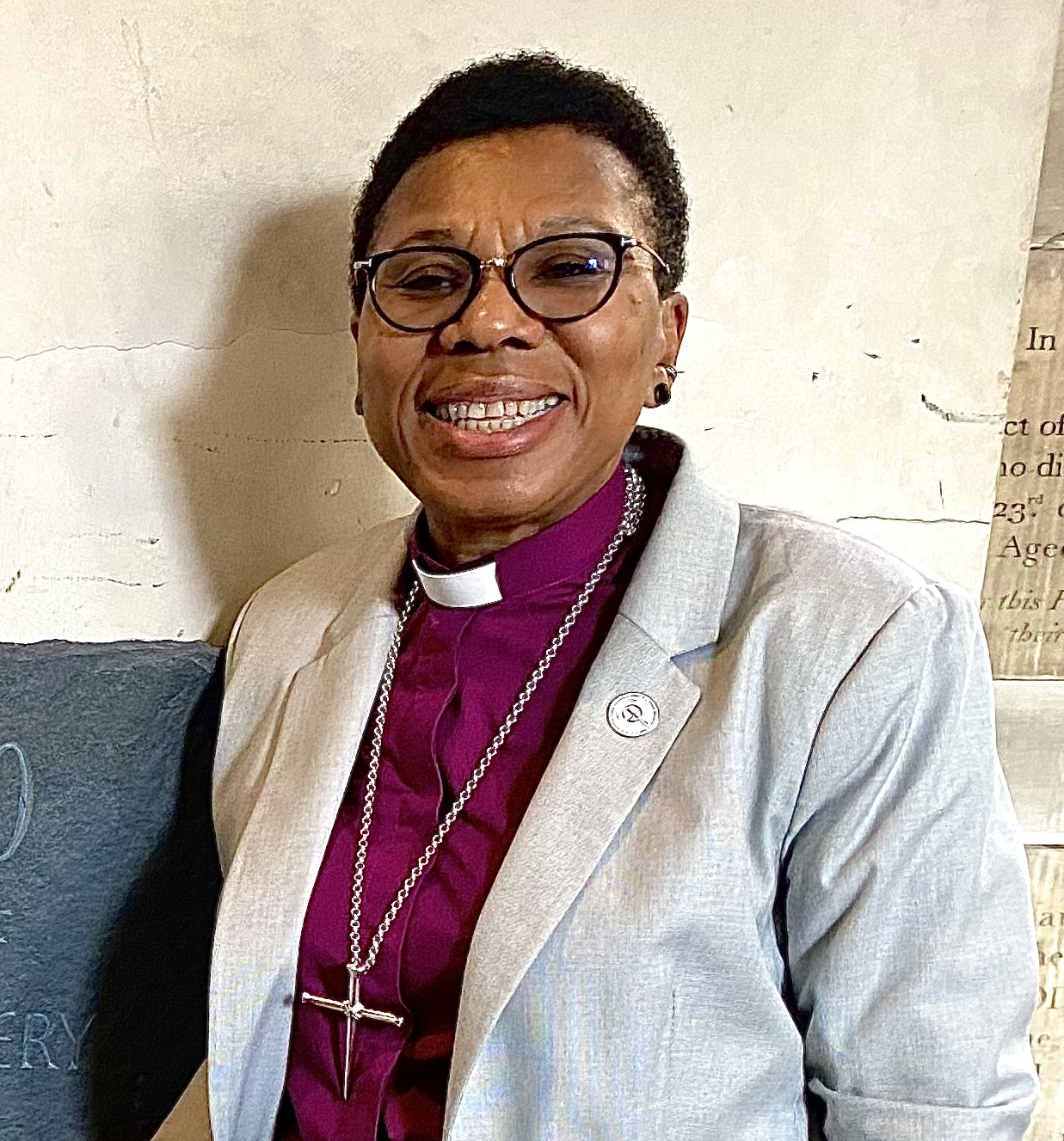
- Mallett in 2023
- Church: Church of England
- Diocese: Diocese of Southwark
- In office: 2022 to present
- Other post: Lead bishop for racial justice (2025–present)
- Previous post: Archdeacon of Croydon (2020–2022)

Orders
- Ordination: 2004 (deacon); 2005 (priest)
- Consecration: 24 June 2022 by Justin Welby

Personal details
- Born: Marlene Rosemarie Mallett; 1959 (age 66–67) Barbados
- Denomination: Anglicanism
- Education: University of Sussex; University of Warwick

Marlene Rosemarie Mallett (born 1959) is a British Anglican bishop and sociologist. Since June 2022, she has served as the Bishop of Croydon, an area bishop in the Diocese of Southwark, and is the first female bishop in the diocese.

She became in 2023 a Vice President of the National Churches Trust.

== Early life and education ==
Mallett was born in 1959 in Barbados. She moved to the United Kingdom as a child. She was educated at Foxford Comprehensive School, a state school in Coventry, West Midlands, England. She studied history and French at the University of Sussex and graduated with a Bachelor of Arts (BA) degree in 1981.

Mallett’s early career was varied. First, she was a historian of the Caribbean, Africa and black Britain. She then moved fields to become a development sociologist, working in Africa and the Caribbean. In 1991, she moved to London to start a PhD, and to work as a medical sociologist and "ethno-cultural mental health research scientist".

She returned to studies, and completed a Doctor of Philosophy (PhD) degree in sociology at the University of Warwick in 1994. Her doctoral thesis was titled "Ambiguous ideology and contradictory behaviour: gender in the development of Caribbean societies: a case study of Antigua", and her doctoral supervisor was Annie Phizacklea.

== Ordained ministry ==
She trained for ministry at the South East Institute of Theological Education. Before ordination in the Church of England, she was a research sociologist and academic, specialising in international development and ethno-cultural mental health.

Mallett was ordained in the Church of England as a deacon in 2004 and as a priest in 2005. She was priest-in-charge and then Vicar of St John the Evangelist, Angell Town, from 2007 to 2020; and Archdeacon of Croydon from 2020 to 2022.

=== Episcopal ministry ===
On 3 May 2022, it was announced that Mallett had been appointed as the next Bishop of Croydon, succeeding the Rt Revd Jonathan Clark on his retirement. She was consecrated as a bishop on 24 June at Southwark Cathedral. She is the first female bishop in the diocese, as well as the second Barbadian Bishop of Croydon, the first having been the Rt Revd Wilfred Wood, who served from 1985 to 2000.

In March 2025, Mallett was additionally appointed joint lead bishop for racial justice, alongside Arun Arora. As such, she is a deputy chair of the Racial Justice Board, a committee of the Archbishops' Council.

=== Views ===
In November 2023, she was one of 44 Church of England bishops who signed an open letter supporting the use of the Prayers of Love and Faith (i.e. blessings for same-sex couples) and called for "Guidance being issued without delay that includes the removal of all restrictions on clergy entering same-sex civil marriages, and on bishops ordaining and licensing such clergy".
