= David Rogers (priest) =

Archdeacon of Craven (1921–2020)

The Venerable David Arthur Rogers

Archdeacon of Craven
- In office 1977–1986

Personal details
- Born: 12 March 1921 South Yorkshire, England
- Died: 23 November 2020 (aged 99)
- Spouse: Joan Malkin

David Arthur Rogers (12 March 1921 – 23 November 2020) was Archdeacon of Craven from 1977 to 1986.

== Early life ==
Rogers was born in a South Yorkshire vicarage in 1921, the son and grandson of clergymen. He was educated at Aysgarth School in Bedale, and St Edward's School, Oxford.

== Military ==
At the start of WWII Rogers joined the Oxford City Local Defence Volunteers, and then, in 1940, the Bedfordshire and Hertfordshire Regiment as a private soldier. In 1941 he was commissioned into the Green Howards Regiment, and later the Royal Armoured Corps. Later in the War, he served in the GHQ Liaison Regiment (Phantom) under Field Marshal Montgomery.

== Career ==
He read Classics at Christ's College, Cambridge and trained for ordination at Ridley Hall, Cambridge. He was ordained deacon in 1949, and priest in 1950. He served his title at St George's, Stockport (1949-53) and was then Rector of St Peter's, Levenshulme (1953-59). He was then Vicar of St Andrew's, Sedbergh (1959-79), as well as Rural Dean of Sedbergh (1959-73) and Rural Dean of Ewecross (1973-77). He was collated Archdeacon of Craven in 1977, and served in that office until his retirement in 1986. He chaired the Council of Parcevall Hall, a diocesan retreat and conference centre.

== Personal life ==
Rogers died in 2020, aged 99. He was predeceased by his wife, Joan. There were four children of the marriage.
