= Thomas Williams (archdeacon of Craven) =

Archdeacon of Craven (1889–1956)

The Venerable Thomas Williams MC VD

Archdeacon of Craven
- In office 1949–1956

Personal details
- Born: Thomas John Williams; 9 May 1889
- Died: 4 July 1956 (aged 67)
- Spouse: Ethel Marion née Roberts

Thomas John Williams MC VD (9 May 1889 – 4 July 1956) was Archdeacon of Craven from 1949 to 1956.

Educated at Durham University and ordained in 1915, Williams was awarded the Military Cross for his service as a Chaplain to the Forces during World War I. He was Vicar of Otley from 1937; and an Honorary Canon of Bradford Cathedral from 1939.
