= John Pulleine =

John James Pulleine (10 September 1841 – 15 April 1913) was an Anglican Suffragan Bishop in the latter part of the 19th and earliest part of the 20th century.

John James Pulleine was born in Spennithorne, Yorkshire in 1841, son of the Rev. Robert Pulleine, sometime Rector of Kirby Wiske. He was educated at Marlborough and Trinity College, Cambridge and ordained in 1868.

He began his career with a curacy at St Giles-in-the-Fields after which he was appointed Rector of his father's old parish. Appointed Suffragan to assist the Bishop of Ripon in 1888, he initially took the title of Bishop of Penrith as this was one of the 26 titles permitted by the Act passed by Henry VIII but this was changed to the more relevant Bishop of Richmond when the Bishops Suffragan Nominations Act was passed. "A man whose long experience rendered his counsel invaluable in diocesan affairs", he died on 15 April 1913.

He married and had children, including a son, John James Pulleine.

== Notes ==
Church of England titles
New title	Bishop of Penrith; 1888–1889	Change of title
Change of title	Bishop of Richmond; 1889–1913	Succeeded by Francis Kilner
