= Foxford Community School =

Location
- Grange Road; Coventry, West Midlands, CV6 6BB; England; 52.4533°N 1.4791°W

Information
- Type: Academy
- Local authority: Coventry City Council
- Trust: Castle Phoenix Trust
- Department for Education URN: 146436 Tables
- Ofsted: Reports
- Head teacher: A Gallagher
- Gender: Coeducational
- Age: 11 to 18
- Enrolment: 1,047 (approx.)
- Website: www.foxfordschool.co.uk

Foxford Community School is a coeducational secondary school and sixth form located in the Longford area of Coventry, West Midlands, England.

The school has a catchment area of north-east Coventry, stretching from Broad Heath to Longford and Holbrooks to Bell Green. The school has over 1,000 students including some 150 in sixth form education.

The school was previously awarded specialist status as an Arts College, and had a new sixth form building built in 2006.

Previously a foundation school administered by Coventry City Council, in October 2018 foxford converted to academy status. The school is now sponsored by the Castle Phoenix Trust.

== Notable former pupils ==
- Bob Ainsworth (born 1952), MP
- Tom Cartwright (1935–2007), cricketer
- Rosemarie Mallett (born 1959) Anglican bishop
