= Francis Kilner =

British Anglican bishop (1851–1921)

- Bishop of Richmond
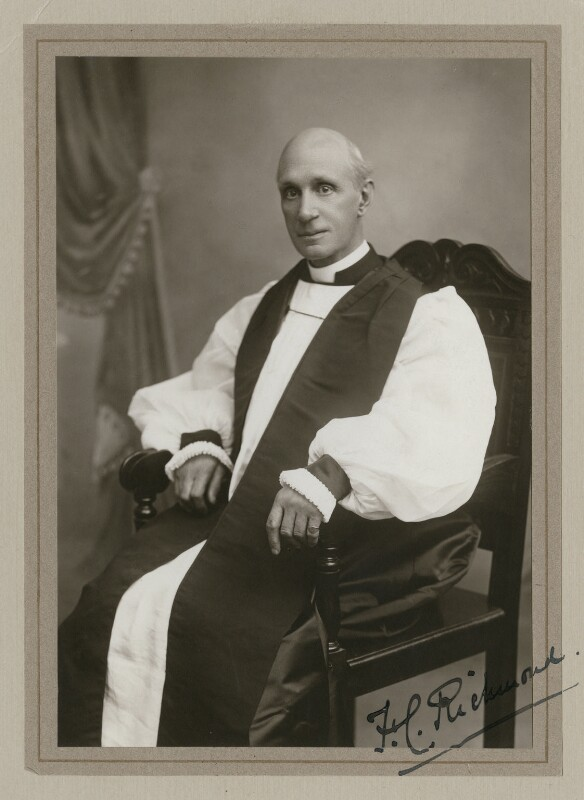
- Bromide print of Kilner, circa 1900s–1910s
- Diocese: Diocese of Ripon
- In office: 1913–1921
- Predecessor: John Pulleine
- Other post: Archdeacon of Craven (1893–1913)

Orders
- Ordination: c. 1874
- Consecration: 29 September 1913 by Cosmo Lang

Personal details
- Born: 1851
- Died: 19 March 1921 (aged 69–70)
- Denomination: Anglicanism
- Parents: James Kilner (priest)
- Education: Keble College, Oxford

Francis Charles Kilner (1851–1921) was a British Anglican suffragan bishop in the early part of the 20th century.

Born in 1851 at Chester (where his father, James Kilner, also a priest, was prison chaplain), Francis was educated at Rugby and Keble College, Oxford.

He was ordained in the Church of England after a period of study at Cuddesdon Theological College: he was made deacon in Advent 1874 (20 December) and ordained priest the following Advent (19 December 1875) — both times by William Jacobson, Bishop of Chester, at Chester Cathedral. He began his career with a curacy at Christ Church, Bootle until 1879, after which he was Missioner for the Diocese of Winchester until 1881. The latter post was called Wilberforce missioner in South London, after which Kilner undertook another curacy, in Portsea, Portsmouth. He then moved to Leeds as Vicar of St Martin's Potternewton until he became Vicar of Bingley and Rural Dean of South Craven (both 1892 1906). He was collated Archdeacon of Craven in 1896 and Vicar of Gargrave in 1906, holding both posts until he was appointed bishop.

He was consecrated a bishop on Michaelmas Day 1913 (29 September) by Cosmo Lang, Archbishop of York, at York Minster, serving as both Bishop suffragan of Richmond and Rector of Stanhope, County Durham until his death on 19 March 1921 (having announced, days before, his intention to retire).
