= Malcolm Grundy =

British Anglican priest (born 1944)

Malcolm Grundy (born 1944) is an Anglican priest, writer and student of ministry in the church.

== Education and career ==
Grundy first part trained as an architect before studying theology at King's College London.www.kcl.ac.uk/ His curacy from 1969 to 1972 was at Doncaster Parish Church, now Doncaster Minster. From there he moved to the Sheffield Industrial Mission becoming Senior Chaplain in 1974. discovery.(nationalarchives.gov.uk) Whilst there he founded 'Workshop 6' a training workshop for unemployed young adults. In 1980, he moved to the Diocese of London to be Director of Education and Community. From 1986 to 1991 he was Team Rector of Huntingdon in the Diocese of Ely. From there three years were spent as Director of the community development training agency AVEC.{www.avecresources.org/}

In 1994, Grundy was appointed Archdeacon of Craven in the Diocese of Bradford where he founded the Craven Trust, a fund to encourage local community projects. He was also part of the Trust's group which set up a fund raising £1.5M to aid farmers and local businesses affected by Foot and Mouth.(www.craventrust.org.uk) A long unexplained stay in this post without further Church of England preferment resulted in his being 'headhunted' in 2005 to become the founding director of the Foundation for Church Leadership, an organization dedicated to the training and support of senior church leaders.(www.westcott.cam.ac.uk) He was an Honorary Canon of Ely Cathedral from 1987 to 1994.(elycathedral.anglican.org) In the staffing and financial crisis surrounding Bradford Cathedral, he was brought in as Acting Dean from 2004 to 2005. He was appointed Non-Stipendiary Residentiary Canon and Acting Dean. On departure he was made Canon Emeritus.

Grundy achieved a PhD from Leeds University in 2014 for a study in the ways in which the Church of England oversees change. In this he was critical of the way in which the Yorkshire Dioceses Review was conducted. He continues to monitor the development of the newly established Diocese of Leeds.(www.leeds.anglican.org) He is a visiting fellow at York St John University (www.yorksj.ac.uk/) and Visiting Fellow in Rural Theology at Bishop Grosseteste University, Lincoln.

Grundy is the author of a series of books on church leadership. Alongside stipendiary employment, he has been co-founder of church related organisations including The Edward King Institute for Ministry Development and founder editor of its journal Ministry, MODEM (Ministerial and Organizational Disciplines for the Advancement of Ministry) and the Foundation for Church Leadership. From 1996 to 2004 he was a Non-executive Director of the Church Times newspaper. He has also been Vice-Chair of the Retired Clergy Association of the Church of England and a trustee of The Women's Education Partnership, formerly Together for Sudan.{www.womenseducationpartnership.org/}and Chair of the York Anglo-Scandinavian Society.

== Publications ==
- Light in the City: Stories of the Church Urban Fund Canterbury Press, 1990
- An Unholy Conspiracy : the separation of church and industry since the Reformation Canterbury Press, 1992
- Evangelisation through the Adult Catechumenate Grove 1991 (translated into Swedish as Om Vuxansvag In I Forsamlingen Verbum, 1992)
- Community Work: a handbook for volunteer groups and local churches Cassell Mowbray, 1995
- The Parchmore Partnership (Ed.) Chester House Publications, 1995
- Understanding Congregations: A new shape for the local church Cassell Mowbray, 1998
- Contributor and Editorial Advisor: Management and Ministry 1997 and Managing, Leading, Ministering March, 1999, Canterbury Press
- Faith On the Way Malcolm Grundy & Peter Ball, Cassell Mowbray, November 2000
- What they don’t teach you at theological college Canterbury Press, 2003
- Contributor to Creative Church Leadership MODEM/ Canterbury Press, February 2004
- What’s new in Church Leadership Canterbury Press, 2007
- Contributor to Breaking the Mould of Christendom, a symposium Epworth Press, 2008
- Leadership and Oversight: new models for episcopal ministry Continuum, 2011
- Multi-Congregation Ministry: theology and practice in a changing church Canterbury Press Norwich, 2015
- Building a Relational Culture: Finding Fellowship in the Church of England Relational Church UK, 2022
