= Bishop of Kirkstall =

Suffragan bishop for Leeds, Yorkshire, England

The Bishop of Kirkstall is an episcopal title used by a suffragan bishop of the Church of England Anglican Diocese of Leeds, in the Province of York, England. It is the suffragan see serving the episcopal area of Leeds, and takes its name from the Leeds suburb of Kirkstall, site of medieval Kirkstall Abbey.

== History ==
On 29 April 2015, the Diocese of Leeds announced that the See of Richmond would be revived for a suffragan bishop to assist the Bishop of Leeds in his area bishop duties. The title had remained in abeyance since 1921. Paul Slater was consecrated to the See of Richmond on 19 July.

Richmond had been an episcopal title used by a suffragan bishop of the Diocese of Ripon, in the Province of York. The title took its name after the town of Richmond in North Yorkshire. First bishop, John Pulleine, was originally created the suffragan Bishop of Penrith in 1888, but his title was changed the following year to Richmond.

On 14 March 2018, the name of the See was changed from Richmond to Kirkstall by Order in Council. The name is taken from a suburb of Leeds known for its ruined Cistercian monastery, Kirkstall Abbey.

== List of bishops ==
Bishops of Richmond
From	Until	Incumbent	Notes
1889	1913	John Pulleine	His suffragan title was changed from Penrith to Richmond by Royal Warrant in 1889.
1913	1921	Francis Kilner	
1921	2015	in abeyance	
19 July 2015	2018	Paul Slater	Consecrated 19 July 2015.
Bishops of Kirkstall
2018	31 January 2022	Paul Slater	continuing in renamed See
2022	present	Arun Arora	Consecrated 15 July 2022

== See also ==
- Archdeacon of Richmond
- Roman Catholic Diocese of Richmond
