= St John's College (Johannesburg) =

Private Anglican school in South Africa

Coordinates: 26°10′35″S 28°03′27″E

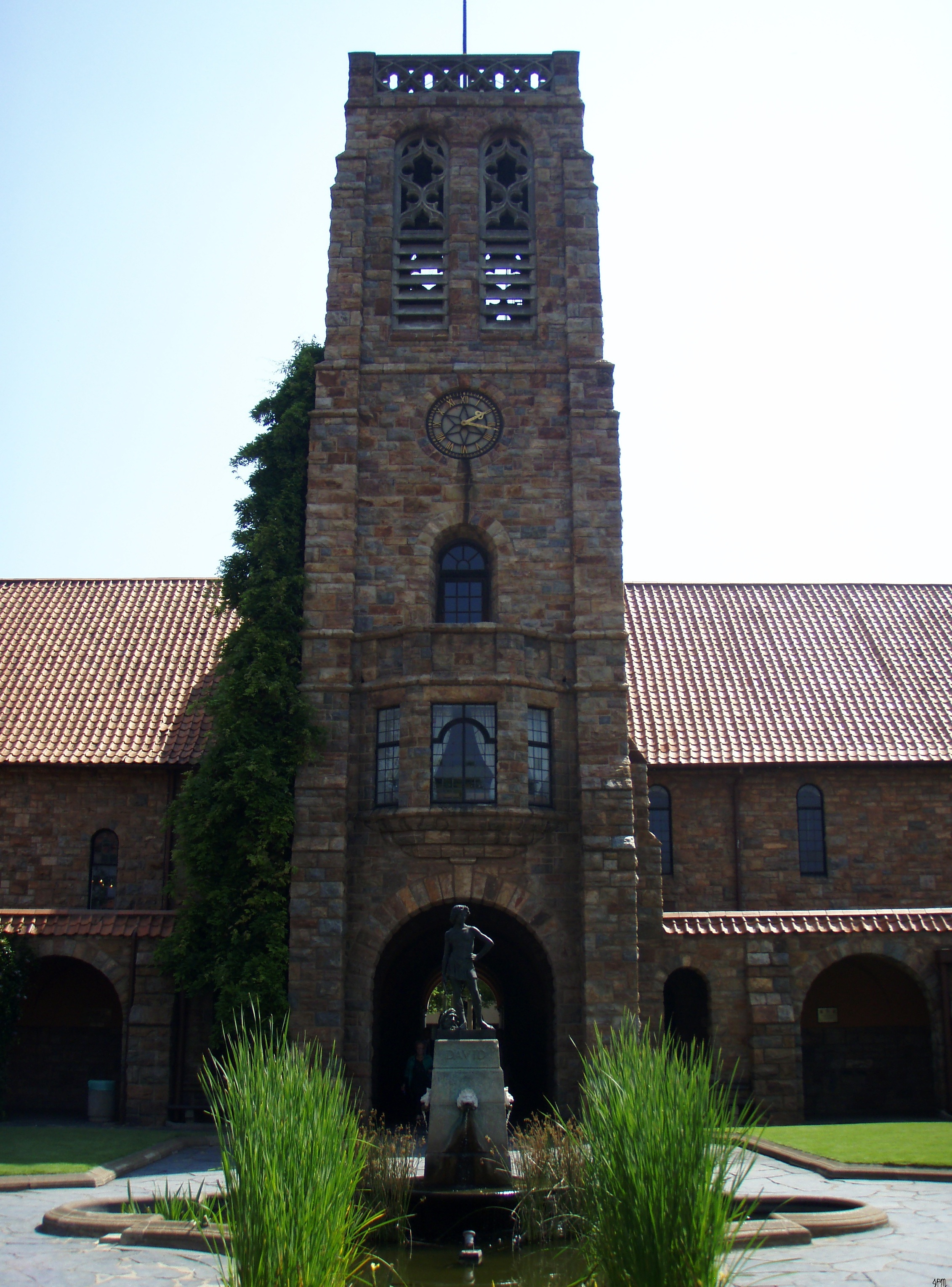
- The Bell Tower at St John's College

Location
- St David Rd, Houghton Estate; Johannesburg, Gauteng; South Africa

Information
- School type: Private and Boarding
- Motto: Lux Vita Caritas (Light, Life, Love)
- Religious affiliation: Anglican
- Established: 1 August 1898; 128 years ago
- Founder: Revd John Darragh
- Sister school: St Mary's School, Waverley
- Rector: The Right Reverend Dr Sepadi Moruthane
- Headmaster: Dale Jackson
- Exam board: IEB
- Chaplain: The Revd Thapelo Masemola
- Staff: 100 full-time
- Grades: Bridge Nursery School (000–00); Pre-Preparatory (0–2); Preparatory (3–7); College (8–12); Sixth Form (Cambridge A Levels)
- Gender: Boys (College); co-educational nursery and Sixth Form
- Age: 3 to 18
- Enrollment: 1,350 pupils
- Language: English
- Schedule: 07:15 – 14:00
- Campus: Urban campus
- Campus type: Suburban
- Houses: 8 College houses + Runge (Sixth Form)
- Colours: Blue, maroon, white
- Mascot: Eagle
- Nickname: The Blues
- Rivals: Christian Brothers' College; Jeppe High School for Boys; King Edward VII School; Parktown Boys' High School; St Stithians College
- Tuition: R352,850 a year (tuition and boarding); R220,828 a year (tuition only)
- Affiliations: Independent Schools Association of Southern Africa; Headmasters' and Headmistresses' Conference
- Day-boy houses: Thomson, Alston, Clarke, Fleming
- Boarding houses: Nash, Hill, Clayton, Hodgson
- Website: www.stjohnscollege.co.za

St John's College is a private Anglican day and boarding school in Houghton Estate, Johannesburg, South Africa. It was founded on 1 August 1898 by the Revd John Darragh, rector of St Mary's Church (later St Mary's Cathedral, Johannesburg), as a parish school for boys. The school comprises a co-educational nursery (the Bridge), a boys' pre-preparatory and preparatory, a boys' senior College, and a co-educational Sixth Form offering Cambridge AS and A Levels. Its sister school is St Mary's School, Waverley.

The Houghton campus was laid out after 1907 to designs by Herbert Baker and Frank Fleming, and is arranged around stone quadrangles in the manner of an English public school. The school is a member of the Independent Schools Association of Southern Africa and the Headmasters' and Headmistresses' Conference.

== History ==
=== Foundation, 1898 ===
In the late 1890s Johannesburg, founded after the 1886 Witwatersrand Gold Rush, had few established boys' schools. Clergy and parishioners of St Mary's Anglican Church on Eloff Street, led by Darragh and his curate the Revd Joseph Lowther Hodgson, pressed for a church school offering "a sound secular and religious education on definite Church of England principles", with a conscience clause for pupils of other denominations.

After a brief start in the porch of St Mary's, the school opened on 1 August 1898 in a rented villa at 32–34 Plein Street. Contemporary and later accounts differ on the exact first-day roll (figures of six, seven and about eleven boys appear); all agree that the school began with a handful of pupils and grew quickly. Hodgson was the first headmaster; Darragh served as warden and the Bishop of Pretoria as Visitor. By the end of the first term of 1899 more than a hundred boys were enrolled.

=== South African War and the "Tin Temple" ===
The Second Boer War interrupted the new school. Johannesburg was evacuated and the school closed in 1900; Hodgson was deported by the Boer authorities. It reopened in 1901–02 after the British occupation. Enrolment recovered to well over a hundred, and the Plein Street house was abandoned for a wood-and-iron building near the Union Grounds, between Joubert Park and the old Wanderers ground (today the site of Johannesburg Park Station). Boys nicknamed the building the "Tin Temple" because of its extremes of heat and cold.

After the war, Lord Milner's administration favoured new government high schools, including the institutions that became King Edward VII School and Jeppe High School for Boys. St John's, as a private church school, lost pupils and was close to financial collapse by about 1905.

=== Community of the Resurrection, 1906–1934 ===
In 1906 the Community of the Resurrection (CR), an Anglo-Catholic religious order based at Mirfield in Yorkshire and already engaged in mission work on the Witwatersrand goldfields, took charge of the school. Four CR priests — James Okey Nash, Clement Thomson, Henry Alston and Eustace Hill — assumed control. Nash became headmaster (1906–1917) and later Coadjutor Bishop of Cape Town.

Nash moved the school north onto Houghton Ridge. The purchase was made possible by a gift of £5,000 from the diamond magnate Thomas Cullinan and by the sale of land below market value by the Johannesburg Consolidated Investment Company. Anna (later Lady) Cullinan laid the foundation stone on 12 January 1907; the first Houghton building was opened on 10 August 1907 by the High Commissioner, the Earl of Selborne. Boarders were accepted that year. The first four houses were Nash, Thomson, Alston and Rakers (renamed Hill in 1910).

The CR administered the school until 1934, when it handed control to the Anglican Diocese of Johannesburg. Subsequent CR headmasters included Thomson, Edward Symonds (briefly), Eustace Hill (from 1922) and Charles Runge, the last of the CR heads. By 1920 the school had about 425 boys, of whom about 170 were in the preparatory department and 90 were boarders.

=== World wars ===
During the First World War a large number of Old Johannians served; school accounts give figures of about 300 men on active service and about 60 killed. Among the decorated was Captain Oswald Austin Reid, awarded the Victoria Cross for actions at the Diyala River in Mesopotamia in March 1917. Reid had attended St John's before going on to Radley College in England. The 1918 influenza pandemic closed the school for most of the last term of that year. Reid died in Johannesburg in 1920; a school cadet detachment attended his funeral.

School accounts of the Second World War state that 876 Johannians served and 94 were killed. The Crypt Chapel was sandbagged and used as an air-raid shelter; staff received firefighting and first-aid training.

=== Diocesan school, 1935–1970 ===
The Revd S. H. Clarke, formerly of Tonbridge School, became headmaster in 1935 and served until 1954, the longest tenure to that date. He sat on the Joint Matriculation Board and was associated with the 1942 raising of the Transvaal matriculation standard.

Deane Yates, previously of Mill Hill School, became the first lay headmaster in 1954–55 and remained until 1970, when he left to found Maru-a-Pula School in Botswana.

=== Later twentieth century and integration ===
Jan Breitenbach, formerly of St Andrew's College, Grahamstown, became the first South African-born headmaster around 1970–72. In 1972 the school cadet corps was disbanded and the first girl was admitted to Sixth Form; in 1973 the academic year was reorganised on a three-term basis.

Although linked through the CR to priests such as Trevor Huddleston, St John's remained a white school for most of the apartheid period. A night school for Black staff began in 1941; among those who enrolled was Louis Motlanthe, father of the later president Kgalema Motlanthe. The St John's College Education Fund was created in 1957. After the Sharpeville massacre in 1960, Bishop Ambrose Reeves, Visitor of the school, was sheltered from the security police by Yates and his wife before Reeves's deportation.

In 1974 the college constitution removed a racial bar from its admission rules. The first Black African and Indian pupils entered in 1979. The first Black teacher is recorded in 1990. Walter Macfarlane, an Old Johannian headmaster in this period, expanded bursary support and outreach to schools in Alexandra. The centenary in 1998 was marked by a scholarship programme and the opening of Hodgson House.

==== Desmond Tutu ====
Desmond Tutu had a long institutional connection with the school, rooted in the Community of the Resurrection. In May 1976, while Dean of Johannesburg, he made a five-day silent retreat at St John's and there wrote a public letter of protest to Prime Minister John Vorster. As Bishop of Johannesburg in 1985–86 he was ex officio Visitor. The footbridge between St John's and neighbouring Roedean School was named the Desmond and Leah Tutu Bridge and opened by Tutu in 2006. In 2018 Gate House Quadrangle (also known as Clarke Quad) was renamed Tutu Quad; a bronze bust was installed in 2019. After Tutu's death in 2021 the school instituted an annual memorial walk through Houghton, Hillbrow, Berea and Yeoville.

=== Twenty-first century ===
Later executive headmasters have included the Revd Roger Cameron (14th), Paul Edey (15th) and Stuart West (16th; to the end of 2025). Dale Jackson became the 17th executive headmaster in 2026 and was licensed in the Memorial Chapel by the Bishop of Johannesburg, the Right Revd Dr Sepadi Moruthane, who is the school's Visitor.

== Headmasters ==
Documented heads include:

- Revd Joseph Lowther Hodgson, first headmaster, from 1898
- Fr James Okey Nash CR, 1906–1917
- Fr Clement Thomson CR, 1917 – about 1920
- Fr Edward Symonds CR, briefly in 1921
- Fr Eustace Hill CR, from 1922
- Fr Charles Runge CR, last CR headmaster, to 1934
- Revd S. H. Clarke, 1935–1954
- Deane Yates, first lay headmaster, 1954/55–1970
- Jan Breitenbach, first South African-born headmaster, from about 1970
- Walter Macfarlane
- Robert Clarence, 1990s
- Revd Roger Cameron, 14th executive headmaster
- Paul Edey, 15th
- Stuart West, 16th, to the end of 2025
- Dale Jackson, 17th, from 2026

== Campus and architecture ==
The Houghton campus occupies a ridge site on St David Road. Sir Herbert Baker prepared a master plan in 1907; construction proceeded in stages as money allowed. Early walls used Orange Grove quartzite quarried on the site; later stone was brought from Krugersdorp and dressed by Maltese masons. John Barrow and Son were among the builders. Frank Fleming, Baker's partner and successor, designed much of the later work, including buildings around David Quad. A Johannesburg 100 / Simon van der Stel Foundation plaque describes the buildings as a "Venture of Faith" by the Community of the Resurrection.

The original 1907 block now forms part of the preparatory school. The senior college is arranged around cloistered quadrangles. The Crypt Chapel, designed by Fleming with work beginning in 1915, seats about 100 and stands beside a Garden of Remembrance; it was intended as the foundation of a larger church above. The War Memorial Chapel over the crypt was completed in the mid-1920s and dedicated in 1926 to Johannians killed in the First World War. It seats about 500, has a choir gallery and a large pipe organ, and contains an All Souls' (Delville Wood) side chapel holding a Delville Wood cross entrusted by the 3rd Regiment, South African Infantry. The bell tower, completed in the early 1930s, stands between the chapel and Darragh Hall.

Facilities recorded by the school include a science centre, libraries, a music centre, a theatre, auditoriums, an outdoor education centre in the Waterberg, three cricket fields, four rugby fields, hockey fields, an aquatics centre, tennis and squash courts, basketball courts and a gymnasium.

== School structure ==
Girls are admitted to the Bridge Nursery and again to Sixth Form; the Pre-Preparatory, Preparatory and College are for boys.

Sixth Form is based in Runge House, named after Charles Runge CR. It offers Cambridge International pathways, including a two-year AS and A Level course and a one-year post-matric A Level course, and has its own boarding arrangements for boys and girls. College leavers write the Independent Examinations Board National Senior Certificate.

=== Houses ===
The College uses a house system.

House	Type	Established	Named after
Nash	Boarding and day	1907	James Okey Nash CR, headmaster 1906–1917
Hill	Boarding and day	1907 (as Rakers)	Eustace Hill CR, headmaster from 1922
Thomson	Day	1907	Clement Thomson CR, headmaster 1917–1921
Alston	Day	1907	Henry Alston CR
Clarke	Day	1935 (as Gate House; Clarke from 1971)	S. H. Clarke, headmaster 1935–1954
Clayton	Boarding and day	1963	Bishop Geoffrey Clayton, Visitor
Hodgson	Boarding and day	1998	J. L. Hodgson, first headmaster
Fleming	Day	2005	Francis Leonard Fleming, architect

Runge House serves the co-educational Sixth Form.

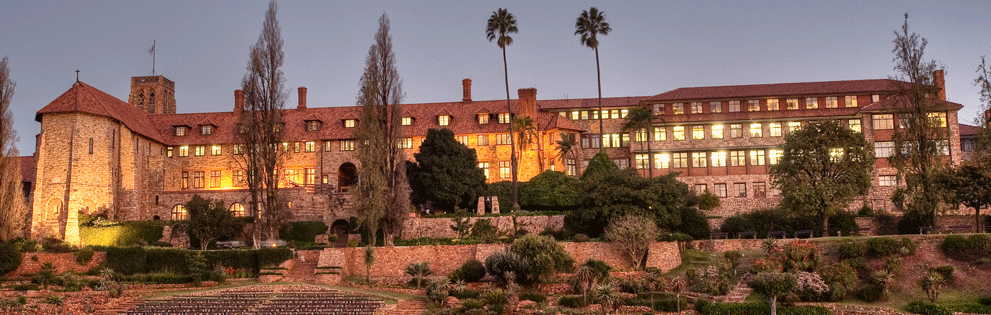
View of the north facade, designed by Sir Herbert Baker.

== Academics ==
College pupils write the IEB National Senior Certificate. In January 2026 the school reported that all 149 candidates in the Class of 2025 achieved a tertiary pass, with 146 bachelor's-degree passes. Sixth Form results are examined by Cambridge International.

A 2003 ranking by Africa Almanac placed the school 11th among 100 high schools in Africa. The list is dated and its method is limited.

== Sport ==
College pupils are required to take a summer and a winter team sport. First-team sports include rugby, cricket, hockey, basketball and tennis. Traditional fixtures are played against King Edward VII School, Jeppe High School for Boys, Parktown Boys' High School, St Stithians College and Christian Brothers' College.

== Notable alumni ==
Alumni are known as Old Johannians. The following have independent sources for notability; several still need a source that explicitly confirms attendance.

- Oswald Austin Reid, recipient of the Victoria Cross
- Caesar Hull, Second World War fighter ace
- Hugh Lewin, anti-apartheid activist, political prisoner and writer
- Glenn Babb, diplomat and politician
- John Edmund Kerrich (1903–1985), professor of mathematical statistics at the University of the Witwatersrand
- Ian Player, conservationist
- Eric Rosenthal, historian and author
- Tony Trahar, chief executive of Anglo American, 2000–2007
- Sir Alastair Morton, chief executive of Eurotunnel
- Clive Rice and Bruce Mitchell, South African Test cricketers
- Chris Froome, professional cyclist
- Demetri Catrakilis, rugby union player
- Owen Nkumane, rugby union player
- Devon Conway, international cricketer
- David Hunt, rower and 2016 Olympian
- Scott Spedding, rugby union player who represented France
- Abel Selaocoe, cellist
- Kai Luke Brümmer, actor
- Gideon Emery, actor
- Sizwe Mpofu-Walsh, writer and academic
- Maps Maponyane, television presenter
- Tshilidzi Marwala, academic
- Siyabulela Xuza, scientist and entrepreneur
- Spoek Mathambo, musician
- Kiernan Forbes (AKA), rapper and producer
- Kaizer Motaung Junior, footballer
- Jack Phipps (1925–2010), British arts administrator

== See also ==
- List of boarding schools
- Anglican Diocese of Johannesburg
- Community of the Resurrection
