= Gonville ffrench-Beytagh =

Anti-apartheid priest in South Africa

The Very Reverend Gonville ffrench-Beytagh
- Dean of Johannesburg
- Church: Anglican
- Province: Southern Africa
- Diocese: Johannesburg

Orders
- Ordination: 1939 by Geoffrey Clayton

Personal details
- Born: 26 January 1913 Shanghai
- Died: 10 May 1991 (aged 78) London

The Very Revd Gonville Aubie ffrench-Beytagh (26 January 1913 – 10 May 1991) was an Anglican priest who served as the Dean of Johannesburg. He was also an anti-apartheid activist and was held in solitary confinement before going on trial for his activism.

== Childhood ==
Gonville ffrench-Beytagh was born on 26 January 1912 in Shanghai, China, the oldest son of Leo Michael ffrench-Beytagh, an Irish cotton company executive and Edith McIlraith nee Watson, an Englishwoman who was born in Yokohama. His mother and father separated when Gonville was a young boy and his mother left for South Africa. His father handed over care of Gonville, together with his younger brother Michael and his younger sister Patricia, to Miss Esylt Newbery, a young female teacher who the family had met in Shanghai. She had no familial connection to the family and received a monthly retainer for several years. She took the children to England to be educated. Gonville attended Monkton Combe School near Bath from 1926 to 1927 and then Bristol Grammar School from 1927 to 1928. His experience of school chapel, Sunday school, confirmation classes and summer camps made him determined never to attend church again. Aged 17 he left England for New Zealand to learn agriculture at Waitaki Boys' High School. He was expelled from Waitaki for misbehaviour. After a time in casual labour, a chance encounter with a distant relative persuaded him to travel to South Africa in 1932, where his mother was now living.

== South Africa ==
In South Africa he took odd jobs including an office job with Toc H in Johannesburg. He was still an irreverent agnostic, but at Toc H he soon became friends with Jonathan Graham, a religious brother in the Community of the Resurrection, Bishop Geoffrey Clayton of Johannesburg later Archbishop of Cape Town, and Alan Paton, author of Cry the Beloved Country. After a hospitalisation during which he was visited by Alan Paton he underwent a religious conversion on Christmas Eve in St Mary's Cathedral, Johannesburg, where the dean had locked the door to keep drunken revellers from the Midnight Mass:

It was a hot night and as the doors had been closed, the air was completely still. I knelt at the communion rail, and as I knelt there I felt a very strong cool breeze – and that was all. I do not think that at the time I had any idea what the word "breath" or the word "wind" means to the Christian, or even that the Greek word for the Holy Spirit means breath. I did not even think of Jesus breathing the spirit on his disciples. All I know is that this breath, or wind, which I felt, had a meaning and a content for me which I have never been able to communicate to anyone else, and still cannot describe.

In 1936, aged 24 and a year after his conversion experience, ffrench-Beytagh was sent by Bishop Clayton to St Paul's Theological College, Grahamstown He later recalled:

The college turned out to be a rather mausoleum-like, dull, brick structure which to me had the psychological impact of a prison.

Clayton urged him to persevere, and made him deacon in 1938 and ordained him priest in 1939.

== Ministry ==
He served in a number of parishes in the then Transvaal Province, including Springs and St Boniface Church Germiston. In 1952, he was made a canon of St Mary's Cathedral, Johannesburg, and appointed priest-in-charge of St Alban's Mission for coloured people near Johannesburg. At an early stage in his ministry he not developed a political consciousness. At Saint Alban's, with his first true contacts outside white society, "the utter nonsensicality of racial discrimination really hit me." He grew increasingly disillusioned with the stealthy encroaches of apartheid. In 1953, he resigned his South African passport in protest at the passing of the Bantu Education Act.

From 1954 to 1964 he was the Dean of the Cathedral of St Mary and All Saints in Salisbury (now Harare) in Southern Rhodesia (now Zimbabwe). He brought the cathedral building near to completion, but his reputation as an outspoken preacher and an opponent of racism was gathering pace, making him one of the most controversial figures in Ian Smith's Rhodesia in the period preceding the Unilateral Declaration of Independence (UDI).

He returned to South Africa in 1965 as Dean of St Mary's Cathedral, Johannesburg, and Archdeacon of Johannesburg Central. There he found Alan Paton had his passport confiscated, and many white people he knew and trusted had been imprisoned or exiled for speaking out for freedom. He quickly became a prominent opponent of apartheid, condemning it as "blasphemous against God and man." ffrench-Beytagh campaigned against the continuing house arrest of Helen Joseph, a member of the cathedral congregation, first met Winnie Mandela, and opened his cathedral doors (Note: those same doors that had been kept closed at Christmas over 30 years earlier) to black protesters chased up the cathedral steps by police beating them with sjamboks, police dogs snapping at their heels.

== Anti-apartheid activism ==
In 1970, while, on leave in London, he arranged with Canon John Collins of St Paul's Cathedral, chairman of the International Defence and Aid Fund for Southern Africa (IDAF) and a leading figure in the Anti-Apartheid Movement, for the IDAF to send aid through Alison Norman, a mutual friend who ffrench-Beytagh met in Harare, to a humanitarian fund managed by ffrench-Beytagh, as the dean in Johannesburg to help black families in the townships around Johannesburg. The money would buy food and children's clothes, pay rents and school fees, and help pay for prison visits, especially long journeys to places such as Robben Island.

== Arrest and trial ==
He was being watched closely by the Bureau of State Security (BOSS). He was arrested on 20 January 1971 and was held in solitary confinement and brutally interrogated.

At first, he was accused of furthering the unlawful activities of the African National Congress (ANC) and the South African Communist Party, and of possessing their pamphlets. Alison Norman was named as a co-conspirator. During his detention, demonstrations and vigils were held throughout South Africa, and the cathedral bells and the bells of many suburban churches were chimed each day in protest.

On 2 August 1971 the trial of the Very Rev. Gonville Aubie ffrench-Beytagh began in the Pretoria Supreme Court before Justice P. M. Cillié, ffrench-Beytagh was represented by Advocate Sydney Kentridge. The main prosecution witness was Kenneth Jordaan, an informer placed by BOSS as one of the dean's altar servers and confidants. Jordaan claimed to have heard the dean inciting the Black Sash (Note: an organisation of middle class, white women) to commit acts of violence against the state, and alleged the dean was involved in a conspiracy to overthrow the state by violence, saying revolution was justified under certain circumstances.

On 1 November 1971 ffrench-Beytagh was found guilty of 10 counts of subversive activity against the state.

On 14 April 1972 the appeal by ffrench-Beytagh against his conviction and sentence under the Terrorism Act, was upheld in the Appellate Division of the South African Supreme Court in Bloemfontein. The Dean thereupon left South Africa for London on the same day.

== Final years ==
He found it difficult to get a parish in England; he did, however, accept a curacy at St Matthew's, Westminster. He moved in 1974 to become rector of St. Vedast-alias-Foster. This church in the City of London is a parish without resident parishioners, which gave ffrench-Beytagh space to concentrate on writing and spiritual direction. He retired from St Vedast's in Christmas 1986, and went to live with friends, including Alison Norman, in an informal community in Tower Hamlets. He died in the London Hospital in Mile End on 10 May 1991, almost twenty years after his forced exile from South Africa.

== Publications ==
- Encountering Darkness. Collins. 1973. ISBN 978-0-00-215205-1.
- Encountering Light. Fontana. 1975. ISBN 978-0-00-623766-2.
- Out of the Depths: Encountering Depression. SLG Press. 2010. ISBN 978-0-7283-0183-2.
- A Glimpse of Glory. Darton, Longman & Todd, Limited. 1986. ISBN 978-0-232-51691-3.
