= Bishop to HM Prisons =

The Bishop to His Majesty's Prisons is an episcopal post in the Church of England relating to the church's chaplaincy to His Majesty's Prison Service. The bishop holds this role alongside their diocesan or suffragan see and works to support the Chaplain-General of Prisons.

== List of bishops ==
Bishops to HM Prisons
From	Until	Incumbent	Notes
1975	1985	John Cavell	Also Bishop of Southampton.
1985	1985	Br Michael (Fisher)	Also Bishop of St Germans.
1985	2001	Robert Hardy	Also Bishop of Maidstone until 1987, thereafter of Lincoln
2001	2007	Peter Selby	Also Bishop of Worcester.
2007	2013	James Jones	Also Bishop of Liverpool.
2013	2020	James Langstaff	Also Bishop of Rochester
2020	present	Rachel Treweek	Also Bishop of Gloucester

== See also ==
- Chaplain-General of Prisons
