= Lamplugh (surname) =

Lamplugh is a surname, and may refer to:

- George William Lamplugh (1859–1926), British geologist
- Kenneth Edward Norman Lamplugh (1901–1979), Anglican bishop
- Suzy Lamplugh (1961–1993), British murder victim
- Thomas Lamplugh (1615–1691), English clergyman
- Thomas Lamplugh (1656–1737), MP for Cockermouth (UK Parliament constituency), 1702–1708
