= Germond =

Germond is a surname. Notable people with the surname include:

- Anne Germond (born 1960), Anglican bishop
- Brian Germond, Anglican bishop
- Jack Germond (1928–2013), American journalist and writer

== See also ==
- Germon
- Warmund, Patriarch of Jerusalem
