= SuperSport (South African broadcaster) =

South African sports television channel

- Logo used since 1994, This is a remodeled version introduced in 2012
- Country: South Africa
- Broadcast area: Africa
- Network: DStv
- Affiliates: ESPN; Eurosport; Fox Sports Australia; Sky Sports; Sony TEN
- Headquarters: Johannesburg

Programming
- Languages: Afrikaans; Amharic; English; Pidgin; Swahili; Portuguese; Sotho; Xhosa; Zulu
- Picture format: 4K, 1080i 16:9, 4:3 (HDTV); Downscaled to 576i for the SDTV feed

Ownership
- Owner: MultiChoice (Canal+ S.A.)
- Sister channels: 1Magic; 1Max; Abol TV; Africa Magic; Akwaaba Magic; Channel O; kykNET; M-Net; M-Net Movies; Me; Maisha Magic; Mzansi Magic; Novela Magic; OneZed; Pearl Magic; Zambezi Magic; Maningue Magic; Kwenda Magic

History
- Launched: 1988; 38 years ago (as Sports segment on M-Net); 1995 (as a single complete channel)
- Former names: M-Net SuperSport (1988–1994)

Links
- Website: supersport.com

Availability

Terrestrial
- M-Net: M-Net (as a sports feed during important events)
- GOtv: 60–69 (Bantu Africa); 160–169 (Ghana); 360–370 (Uganda); 560–570 (Kenya)
- CSN

Streaming media
- DStv Stream App: Available to Subscribers
- CANAL+ App: Available to Subscribers

SuperSport is a South African-based group of television channels carried on the DStv & CANAL+ satellite platforms and the GOtv terrestrial platform for live sports programming. It provides sports content in South Africa, Nigeria and all Sub-Saharan Africa countries.

SuperSport broadcasts a wide range of major sporting events and leagues, including association football, rugby, cricket, tennis, golf, motorsport, cycling, boxing, wrestling, field hockey, and athletics. At its peak, it was the world's largest broadcaster of live rugby and cricket, though it has since been overtaken by Sky Sports. It also held the position of the second-largest Premier League broadcaster globally, offering live matches and, when possible, high-definition broadcasts through the Premier League's Content Service.

In addition to its satellite channels, SuperSport provides content to M-Net, CSN, and occasionally M-Net HD. Following the model of Sky Sports, in September 2020, SuperSport began operating thematic channels, dedicating specific channels to major sports.

Currently, more than 3.5 million households across Africa access SuperSport via the DStv platform.

== History ==
In 1986, M-Net was launched as South Africa's first pay-television channel and, along with Canal+, only the second outside of the United States. The channel immediately showed its intention to include sport in its programming line-up, by securing exclusive rights of an important Currie Cup match between Transvaal and Western Province for its first ever broadcast. From 1988, sports coverage on M-Net ran under the banner of M-Net SuperSport.

M-Net SuperSport expanded its range of coverage, including live overseas rugby, cricket, golf, boxing and cycling. Following South Africa's readmission into international cricket, SuperSport scored another marketing coup by securing exclusive rights to the 1992 Cricket World Cup.

When rugby turned professional in 1995, a deal was struck between the newly formed SANZAR and Rupert Murdoch's News Corporation. In South Africa, SuperSport was awarded exclusive broadcasting rights of the Super 12 competition, as well as the Tri Nations. Following this deal, rugby gradually ceased broadcasting on the SABC, while SuperSport became a carrier of live rugby broadcasts.

At the same time, Naspers expanded its pay-television operations to a satellite carrier. With the launch of DStv in 1995, SuperSport became a multi-channel network and an independent brand, although it was still primarily associated with M-Net. The network made full use of the satellite platform to expand its sports offering: For the Olympic Games, six channels are generally used for live events.

On 4 September 2001, SuperSport moved its locations on the DStv platform. All of the SuperSport channels were now located in the 21-29 range while SuperSport Zone moved to channel 20. SuperSport International was renamed SuperSport 3, with an emphasis on the "big 3" sports (soccer, athletics, boxing) carried by the network. The interactive service, SuperSport Zone, started in May 2001.

In 2007, the SABC lost its exclusive rights to the local Premier Soccer League (PSL) to SuperSport, in a deal worth R1.6 billion. The deal stipulated that some matches had to be shared with the SABC. In August 2011, SuperSport renewed its contract with the PSL for another five years.

Since 2011, SuperSport's association with M-Net began to fade, when M-Net split its terrestrial feed from its DStv channel. DStv viewers can no longer watch sports events on M-Net, although terrestrial subscribers still get feeds on the main channel, as well as the Community Services Network (CSN).

A Premier Soccer League team bears the channel's name. SuperSport United F.C. was originally known as Pretoria City but bought by M-Net in 1995 after which it was renamed. In July 2025, it was announced that Siwelele F.C. would buy the club.

On August 8, 2020, SuperSport announced a gradual makeover/revamp of its channels, meaning the numbering of the channels since the channel's commencement of expansion in 2003 such as SuperSport 3 would be replaced with specific-sport TV channels which they "enhances the sports viewers' experience" and "makes it easier to find and watch a favourite league, competition or sport". The revamp would be operational from September 1, 2020, onwards.

On April 22, 2021, SuperSport got ownership of School Sport Live and rebranded it into SuperSport Schools. Under the new ownership, SuperSport Schools will continue to broadcast the best of School Sports online and also through SuperSport linear channels bringing it close to their other content. In this agreement, the brand is expected to get a mobile app later in the year.

== List of channels ==
SuperSport has 3 broadcast feeds on the African continent; South Africa, Nigeria & Rest of Africa (ROA).

=== South Africa ===
Channel Name	Channel Number	Packages
SuperSport WWE HD	128	DStv Starter
SuperSport Events HD	199	DStv Sports
SuperSport Blitz HD	200	DStv Easyview
SuperSport Grandstand HD	201	DStv Premium
SuperSport PSL HD	202	DStv Select
SuperSport Premier League HD	203	DStv Sports
SuperSport LaLiga HD	204	DStv Starter
SuperSport Football HD	205	DStv Select
SuperSport Football Plus HD	206	DStv Sports
SuperSport Kickoff HD	207	DStv Starter
SuperSport Africa HD	208	DStv Starter
SuperSport Action HD	209	DStv Sports
SuperSport Extra HD	210	DStv Sports
SuperSport Rugby HD	211	DStv Premium
SuperSport Cricket HD	212	DStv Sports
SuperSport Golf HD	213	DStv Premium
SuperSport Tennis HD	214	DStv Premium
SuperSport Motorsport HD	215	DStv Premium
SuperSport Schools HD	216	DStv Easyview
SuperSport Extra 2 HD	217	DStv Premium
SuperSport Máximo 1 HD	241	DStv Premium
SuperSport Play	243	DStv Free To View
SuperSport OTT 1 (AWSN)	244	DStv Stream Starter
SuperSport OTT 2	245	DStv Stream Sports
SuperSport OTT 3	246	DStv Stream Sports
SuperSport OTT 4	247	DStv Stream Sports
SuperSport OTT 6	248	DStv Stream Sports
SuperSport OTT 7	950	DStv Stream Sports
SuperSport OTT 5	951	DStv Stream Sports
SuperSport OTT 8	952	DStv Stream Sports
SuperSport CSN	490	
M-Net Terrestrial	491	

=== Nigeria ===
Channel Name	Channel Number	Packages
SuperSport WWE HD	128 or 206	DStv Select
SuperSport WWE HD	69	GOtv Select
SuperSport Events HD	199	DStv Sports
SuperSport Blitz Africa HD	200	DStv Starter
SuperSport Blitz Africa HD	60	GOtv Easy
SuperSport Grandstand HD	201	DStv Premium
SuperSport Football Plus HD	202	DStv Sports
SuperSport Football Plus HD	66	GOtv Sports
SuperSport Premier League HD	203	DStv Sports
SuperSport Premier League HD	64	GOtv Sports
SuperSport LaLiga HD	204	DStv Starter
SuperSport LaLiga HD	63	GOtv Starter
SuperSport Football HD	205	DStv Select
SuperSport Football HD	64	GOtv Select
SuperSport Kickoff HD	207	DStv Starter
SuperSport Kickoff HD	61	GOtv Starter
SuperSport Africa HD	208	DStv Starter
SuperSport Africa HD	62	GOtv Easy
SuperSport Action HD	209	DStv Sports
SuperSport Action HD	67	GOtv Sports
SuperSport Extra HD	210	DStv Sports
SuperSport Extra HD	68	GOtv Sports
SuperSport Rugby	211	DStv Premium
SuperSport Cricket	212	DStv Premium
SuperSport Golf	213	DStv Premium
SuperSport Tennis HD	214	DStv Premium
SuperSport Motorsport HD	215	DStv Premium
SuperSport Extra 2 HD	217	DStv Premium
SuperSport Máximo 1 HD	241	DStv Premium
SuperSport Máximo 2 HD	242	DStv Premium
SuperSport OTT 1 (AWSN)	244	DStv Stream Starter
SuperSport OTT 2	245	DStv Stream Sports
SuperSport OTT 3	246	DStv Stream Sports
SuperSport OTT 4	247	DStv Stream Sports
SuperSport OTT 6	248	DStv Stream Sports
SuperSport OTT 7	950	DStv Stream Sports
SuperSport OTT 5	951	DStv Stream Sports
SuperSport OTT 8	952	DStv Stream Sports

=== Rest Of Africa ===
Most of the channels for SuperSport Nigeria are shared with the Rest of African (ROA) Feed, excluding only 3 channels as SuperSport has catered for a separate ROA feed for these. They are SS Football Plus, SS Premier League & SS LaLiga. The Sub-Saharan African feed is divided into 2 zones, Anglophone Africa (English-speaking countries) & Lusophone Africa (Portuguese-speaking countries).

==== Anglophone Africa ====
Channel Name	Channel Number	Packages
SuperSport WWE HD	128 or 226	DStv Select DStv Starter (Southern Africa only)
SuperSport WWE HD	69	GOtv Select GOtv Starter (Namibia)
SuperSport WWE HD	725	CANAL+ English Plus & TOUT CANAL+
SuperSport Events HD	199	DStv Sports
SuperSport PSL HD	202	DStv Select (Southern Africa only)
SuperSport PSL HD	58	GOtv Select (Southern Africa only)
SuperSport Schools HD	216	DStv Starter (Southern Africa only)
SuperSport Swahili HD	216	DStv Sports (Kenya, Uganda) DStv Select (Tanzania)
SuperSport Swahili HD	570 or 370	GOtv Sports (Kenya, Uganda)
SuperSport Extra 2 HD	217	DStv Ultimate
SuperSport Blitz Africa HD	220	DStv Starter
SuperSport Blitz Africa HD	60	GOtv Easy GOtv Starter (Namibia)
SuperSport Grandstand HD	221	DStv Ultimate
SuperSport Football Plus HD	222	DStv Sports
SuperSport Football Plus HD	66	GOtv Sports
SuperSport Football Plus HD	110 or 253 or 78	CANAL+ English Plus & TOUT CANAL+
SuperSport Premier League HD	223	DStv Sports
SuperSport Premier League HD	64	GOtv Sports
SuperSport Premier League HD	112 or 255 or 80	CANAL+ English Plus & TOUT CANAL+
SuperSport LaLiga HD	224	DStv Starter
SuperSport LaLiga HD	63	GOtv Starter
SuperSport LaLiga HD	113 or 256 or 81	CANAL+ English Plus & TOUT CANAL+
SuperSport Football HD	225	DStv Select
SuperSport Football HD	65	GOtv Select
SuperSport Football HD	111 or 254 or 79	CANAL+ English Plus & TOUT CANAL+
SuperSport Kickoff HD	227	DStv Starter
SuperSport Kickoff HD	61	GOtv Starter
SuperSport Africa HD	228	DStv Starter
SuperSport Africa HD	62	GOtv Easy GOtv Starter (Namibia)
SuperSport Action HD	229	DStv Sports
SuperSport Action HD	67	GOtv Sports
SuperSport Action HD	726	CANAL+ English Plus & TOUT CANAL+
SuperSport Extra HD	230	DStv Sports
SuperSport Extra HD	68	GOtv Sports
SuperSport Rugby	231	DStv Ultimate
SuperSport Cricket	232	DStv Ultimate DStv Sports (Southern Africa only)
SuperSport Cricket	73	GOtv Sports (Namibia)
SuperSport Golf	233	DStv Ultimate
SuperSport Tennis HD	234	DStv Ultimate
SuperSport Motorsport HD	235	DStv Ultimate
SuperSport Máximo 1 HD	241	DStv Ultimate
SuperSport Máximo 2 HD	242	DStv Ultimate
SuperSport Play	243	DStv Free To View (Southern Africa only)
SuperSport OTT 1 (AWSN)	244	DStv Stream Starter
SuperSport OTT 2	245	DStv Stream Sports
SuperSport OTT 3	246	DStv Stream Sports
SuperSport OTT 4	247	DStv Stream Sports
SuperSport OTT 6	248	DStv Stream Sports
SuperSport OTT 7	950	DStv Stream Sports
SuperSport OTT 5	951	DStv Stream Sports
SuperSport OTT 8	952	DStv Stream Sports

==== Lusophone Africa ====
(Applies mainly in Angola & Mozambique)

Channel Name	Channel Number	Packages
SuperSport Máximo 360	600	DStv Inicial
SuperSport Máximo 360	50	GOtv Essencial
SuperSport Máximo 1 HD	601	DStv Desporto
SuperSport Máximo 1 HD	53	GOtv Desporto
SuperSport Máximo 2 HD	602	DStv Desporto
SuperSport Máximo 2 HD	52	GOtv Desporto
SuperSport Máximo 3 HD	603	DStv Select (Angola) DStv Inicial (Mozambique)
SuperSport Máximo 3 HD	51	GOtv Inicial
SuperSport WWE HD	610 or 626	DStv Select
SuperSport WWE HD	69	GOtv Select
SuperSport Blitz Africa HD	620	DStv Inicial
SuperSport Blitz Africa HD	60	GOtv Lite
SuperSport Grandstand HD	621	DStv Ultra
SuperSport Football Plus HD	622	DStv Desporto
SuperSport Football Plus HD	66	GOtv Desporto
SuperSport Premier League HD	623	DStv Desporto
SuperSport Premier League HD	64	GOtv Desporto
SuperSport LaLiga HD	624	DStv Select (Angola) DStv Inicial (Mozambique)
SuperSport LaLiga HD	63	GOtv Inicial
SuperSport Football HD	625	DStv Select
SuperSport Football HD	65	GOtv Select
SuperSport Kickoff HD	627	DStv Inicial
SuperSport Kickoff HD	61	GOtv Inicial
SuperSport Africa HD	628	DStv Inicial
SuperSport Africa HD	62	GOtv Inicial
SuperSport Action HD	629	DStv Desporto
SuperSport Action HD	67	GOtv Desporto
SuperSport Extra HD	630	DStv Desporto
SuperSport Rugby	631	DStv Premium
SuperSport Cricket	632	DStv Premium
SuperSport Golf	633	DStv Premium
SuperSport Tennis HD	634	DStv Premium
SuperSport Motorsport HD	635	DStv Ultra
SuperSport OTT 1 (AWSN)	244	DStv Stream Inicial
SuperSport OTT 2	245	DStv Stream Desporto
SuperSport OTT 3	246	DStv Stream Desporto
SuperSport OTT 4	247	DStv Stream Desporto
SuperSport OTT 6	248	DStv Stream Desporto
SuperSport OTT 7	950	DStv Stream Desporto
SuperSport OTT 5	951	DStv Stream Desporto
SuperSport OTT 8	952	DStv Stream Desporto

=== SuperSport Events (199) ===
SuperSport Events is SuperSport's main hub for several exclusive sporting events. It also acts as an overflow channel when other SuperSport channels are occupied with live sporting action. The channel is available on DStv Sports.

=== SuperSport Blitz (200) ===
SuperSport Blitz (Blitz Africa outside South Africa), formerly known as SuperSport Update, was launched on 1 October 2006 featuring news, features, announcements, highlights, previews & sporting events all around the world. For some hours it relays Sky Sports News live from the UK.

The channel is available on DStv Easyview in South Africa & DStv Starter and GOtv Easy in the Rest of Africa (incl. Nigeria).

=== SuperSport Grandstand (201) ===
SuperSport Grandstand is SuperSport's go-to premium destination, featuring the day's best live sport available. These include any sporting events from rugby, golf, tennis, motorsport, cricket, and football.

This channel is only available to DStv Premium in South Africa & Nigeria, and DStv Ultimate in the Rest of Africa.

=== SuperSport PSL (202) ===
SuperSport PSL focuses mainly on domestic soccer matches in South Africa and other African countries through live broadcasts, magazine shows and highlights. They now show Premier Soccer League (PSL) matches every Tuesday, Wednesday, Friday, Saturday and Sunday as part of their "Super Diski" shows. The channel also shows many PSL themed news and talk shows under the "PSL TV" brand. These shows air at least one new show nightly. They include Extra Time, Back Pages, Mzansi Legends, National First Division Show, PSL News, Love PSL and various club magazine shows. All local matches have Zulu and Sesotho commentary.

As this channel is locally oriented (South Africa), it is included on the DStv Select package in South Africa & Southern Africa, and on the GOtv Select bouquet for Southern African viewers.

=== SuperSport Premier League (203) ===
SuperSport Premier League is a 24-hour football/soccer channel, mainly dedicated to the Premier League as well as other English cup competitions such as the FA Cup and the EFL Cup. It also broadcasts key matches in European and international football including the UEFA Champions League, UEFA Europa League, UEFA Nations League, FIFA internationals among others. This channel is available on DStv Sports, GOtv Sports (Nigeria & ROA), & CANAL+ English Plus packages.

=== SuperSport LaLiga (204) ===
SuperSport LaLiga is the premier destination for all things La Liga as well as showcasing overflow matches from several major football tournaments. The channel is available on DStv Starter, GOtv Starter (Nigeria & ROA) and CANAL+ English Plus packages.

=== SuperSport Football (205) ===
SuperSport Football primarily showcases Serie A while also broadcasting matches from the EFL Championship, Premier League, UEFA Champions League and UEFA Europa League, and selected international matches. The channel is available on DStv Select, GOtv Select (Nigeria & ROA) and CANAL+ English Plus bouquets.

=== SuperSport Football Plus (206) ===
SuperSport Football Plus is a 24-hour dedicated football/soccer channel, specifically made for as the home of UEFA Champions League alongside acting as a soccer overflow channel broadcasting other live fixtures when other SuperSport channels are occupied with live events.

This channel is available on the DStv Sports package, as well as on GOtv Sports (Nigeria & ROA) and the CANAL+ English Plus packages.

=== SuperSport Kickoff (207) ===
SuperSport Kickoff is a dedicated football channel that usually broadcasts delayed as well as a select number of live matches from the Premier League, Serie A, Ligue 1, the Premier Soccer League (PSL), the UEFA Champions League, and the UEFA Europa League. It also carries football programming from previews and reviews, match highlights and studio shows. The channel is available on DStv Starter, as well as on GOtv Starter for Nigerian & Rest Of Africa customers.

=== SuperSport Africa (208) ===
SuperSport Africa focuses on grassroot sports including varsity rugby, netball, BNL, DStv Diski Challenge and SRC in South Africa as well as the best of African sports from boxing, CAF Champions League, CAF Confederation Cup, EFC, athletics events and marathons. It also broadcasts select football matches and WWE highlights. The channel is offered under the DStv Starter pack and GOtv Easy bouquet for Nigeria & the Rest Of Africa.

=== SuperSport Action (209) ===
SuperSport Action broadcasts mainly combat sports from the UFC, PFL and EFC in mixed martial arts programming, as well as African boxing promotions and WWE programming. It also beams overflow content from rugby, soccer, athletics, and cricket. The channel is available on DStv Sports across the continent, & on GOtv Sports and CANAL+ English Plus (Nigeria & ROA).

=== SuperSport Extra (210) ===
SuperSport Extra focuses on niche sports programming such as cycling, gymnastics, hockey, sailing, squash, and swimming while also functioning as an overflow channel for soccer, golf, tennis, rugby and cricket. The channel is available on DStv Sports, alongside the GOtv Sports pack in the Rest Of Africa (incl. Nigeria)

=== SuperSport Rugby (211) ===
SuperSport Rugby is the channel which focuses mainly on rugby. It shows all national team rugby matches live, as well as all Super Rugby fixtures, the Currie Cup, Varsity Rugby and certain top high school and club matches. Most matches have commentary in both English and Afrikaans, with a growing number also featuring a Xhosa feed.

As the world's second largest broadcaster of live rugby, SuperSport's current lead commentators in English are Matthew Pearce, Hugh Bladen, Gavin Cowley, Owen Nkumane and Paul Stubbs, while their analyst pool includes Joel Stransky, Gcobani Bobo, Bobby Skinstad, Breyton Paulse, Nick Mallett, Ashwin Willemse, Kobus Wiese, Victor Matfield, Jean de Villiers and Naas Botha.

The channel is exclusively on DStv Premium (South Africa & Nigeria) and DStv Ultimate (Rest of Africa).

=== SuperSport Cricket (212) ===
SuperSport Cricket primarily shows Cricket. All international cricket involving the South African national cricket team, as well as certain domestic cricket, is shown on this channel. The presentation and commentary team who cover South African home games include Mark Nicholas, Mike Haysman, Pommie Mbangwa, Michael Holding, Shaun Pollock, Makhaya Ntini, JP Duminy and guest pundits from the opposition team.

The channel is now available on DStv Sports in South Africa and Southern Africa, DStv Premium in Nigeria, and DStv Ultimate in the Rest of Africa, as well as on for GOtv Sports viewers in Namibia.

=== SuperSport Golf (213) ===
SuperSport Golf is the home of the majors with coverage of the PGA tour and other major golfing events including the Open, The Masters and many more.

This channel is available only on DStv Premium in South Africa & Nigeria, and on DStv Ultimate in the Rest of Africa.

=== SuperSport Tennis (214) ===
SuperSport Tennis is a 24-hour dedicated tennis channel showcasing live tennis from Grand Slams to the ATP Tour, WTA & other major tennis events.

Available to DStv Premium (South Africa & Nigeria) and DStv Ultimate (Rest Of Africa) viewers.

=== SuperSport Motorsport (215) ===
SuperSport Motorsport features live and archive content including Formula 1, DTM, MotoGP, Superbikes, Formula E, NASCAR and more.

Exclusive to DStv Premium and DStv Ultimate.

=== SuperSport Schools (216) ===
Formerly School Sports Live, SuperSport Schools is the dedicated sports channel, championing the best of South Africa's sporting talents in youth-oriented sports from several high schools across the country. Sporting codes such as rugby, football, swimming, and netball are broadcast on this channel as well as dedicated programming from podcast discussions highlighting the next future stars of South African sport.

The channel is available on DStv Easyview in South Africa and DStv Starter in Southern Africa.

=== SuperSport Extra 2 (217) ===
SuperSport Extra 2 acts as an overflow channel, mainly for premium sports content as well as niche sports when other SuperSport channels have live events ongoing. The channel is available exclusively on DStv Premium (South Africa & Nigeria) and DStv Ultimate (Rest Of Africa)

=== SuperSport WWE (128) ===
SuperSport WWE is the dedicated channel for all things WWE programming in Sub-Saharan Africa. This channel features live broadcasts of WWE's flagship programming of WWE Raw, WWE SmackDown and WWE NXT as well as Premium Live Events (PLEs). The channel also carries additional content from the defunct WWE Network including classic pay-per-view events, WWE 24, WWE Ride Along and more.

SuperSport WWE is available on DStv Starter in South Africa and Southern Africa, DStv Select, GOtv Select, and CANAL+ English Plus (Nigeria & ROA).

=== SuperSport Máximo (241) ===
SuperSport Maximo is the Portuguese-language channel broadcasting the same events from the other SuperSport channels, mainly the UEFA Champions League, Formula 1 and Premier League in some instances. It is available mainly in the countries of Lusophone Africa, but also in other African countries including South Africa.

== See also ==
- M-Net
- Filmnet
- K-T.V.
