= Edmund Morgan =

Edmund Morgan may refer to:

- Edmund Morgan (historian) (1916–2013), American historian of early American history
- Edmund Morgan (of Llandaff), Welsh politician who sat in the House of Commons in 1601 and 1621
- Edmund Morgan (bishop) (1888–1979), bishop of Southampton, and of Truro
