= Moreo =

Moreo is a surname. Notable people with the surname include:

- Adriana Moreo, Argentine-American physicist
- Riccardo Moreo (born 1996), Italian footballer
- Stefano Moreo (born 1993), Italian footballer
- Stephen Moreo, Anglican cleric, bishop of Johannesburg
