= Xolani =

Xolani is a South African Xhosa, Zulu male given name.

Notable people with this name include:

- Xolani Dlwati, South African priest
- Xolani Mahlaba, South African cricketer
- Xolani Mdaki, South African footballer
- Xolani Mlambo, South African footballer
- Xolani Sotashe, South African politician
- Xolani (comics) a supervillain from DC Comics
- Ibram Xolani Kendi, American author
