= Michael Fisher (Anglican bishop) =

English Anglican bishop and Franciscan friar

The Right Reverend Michael Fisher SSF
- Bishop of St Germans
- Diocese: Diocese of Truro
- In office: 1979–1985
- Predecessor: Richard Rutt
- Successor: Richard Llewellin
- Other post: Bishop to HM Prisons

Orders
- Ordination: 1954
- Consecration: 1979

Personal details
- Born: Reginald Lindsay Fisher; 6 April 1918 Streatham, London, England
- Died: 5 December 2003 (aged 85) Cambridge, England
- Denomination: Anglican

Michael Fisher SSF (born Reginald Lindsay Fisher; 6 April 1918 – 5 December 2003) was an English Anglican bishop and Franciscan friar (often known as "Brother Michael"). He was the second Bishop of St Germans in the Diocese of Truro in the modern era.

== Early life and education ==
Fisher was born on 6 April 1918 in Streatham, London, and educated in Clapham. In 1978, he was awarded a Lambeth MA by the Archbishop of Canterbury.

== Religious life ==
Fisher entered the Anglican Society of Saint Francis (SSF) in 1944 and took "Michael" as his religious name.

=== Ordained ministry ===
Fisher was ordained in 1954 after studying at Westcott House, Cambridge. He worked initially with the Student Christian Movement and was, successively, the guardian of Alnmouth Friary, minister general of the Society of Saint Francis and general secretary of the United Society for the Propagation of the Gospel (USPG). Fisher was consecrated a suffragan bishop in 1979.

=== Involvement with abuse ===
A 2016 Church of England enquiry reported that in 1978 Fisher had behaved inappropriately when a young man approached him concerning sadistic abuse he had suffered from a cleric. Fisher initiated an "intense romantic relationship" with the young man, who told the enquiry that he felt that it was not the right response to a young man looking for help. He commented:

[It] added another layer to the complexity of abuse. At the time, it didn't occur to me that this charismatic figure was abusing me spiritually and emotionally.

=== Subsequent ministry ===
For a brief period, Fisher deputised for the Bishop of Truro when Graham Leonard was translated to be the Bishop of London. He retired in 1985, serving subsequently as minister general of the Society of St Francis.

In the last part of his life, he lived at the Franciscans' house in Cambridge, where he served as an advisor and spiritual director to a large number of people. He also regularly celebrated and preached at St Bene't's Church. He published his memoirs, For the Time Being, in 1993 as Michael Fisher SSF (combining his name in religion with his surname).

His latter years were dogged by recurrent tuberculosis and he died on 5 December 2003.

Church of England titles
Preceded by Richard Rutt	Bishop of St Germans; 1979 –1985	Succeeded by Richard Llewellin
Preceded by John Cavell	Bishop to HM Prisons; 1985	Succeeded by Robert Hardy
