= Brian Germond =

Brian Germond was the Bishop of Johannesburg from 2000 to 2013.

Since then, he has been at St Martin's in the Veld, Johannesburg.

His sister-in-law is the Bishop of Algoma.

== Notes ==
Anglican Church of Southern Africa titles
Preceded by Duncan Buchanan	Bishop of Johannesburg; 2000 –2013	Succeeded by Stephen Moreo
