= John Cavell (bishop) =

British Anglican bishop (1916–2017)

The Right Honourable John Cavell
- Bishop of Southampton
- Church: Church of England
- Diocese: Diocese of Winchester
- In office: 1972–1984
- Predecessor: Kenneth Lamplugh
- Successor: David Cartwright
- Other posts: Bishop to HM Prisons and Borstals (1975–1985); Honorary assistant bishop in Salisbury (1988–2010)

Orders
- Ordination: May 1940 (deacon); 11 June 1941 (priest)
- Consecration: February 1972

Personal details
- Born: 4 November 1916
- Died: 19 May 2017 (aged 100)
- Denomination: Anglican
- Parents: William & Edith Warner
- Spouse: Mary Penman (m. 1942; d. 1988)
- Children: 1 daughter
- Education: Queens' College, Cambridge

John Kingsmill Cavell (4 November 1916 – 19 May 2017) was a British Anglican bishop. From 1972 to 1984, he was the ninth Bishop of Southampton, a suffragan bishop in the Diocese of Winchester.

== Early life and education ==
Cavell was educated at Sir Roger Manwood's School and Queens' College, Cambridge, whence he gained his Cambridge Master of Arts (MA Cantab).

== Ordained ministry ==
He was ordained a deacon at Trinity in May 1940 and a priest on 11 June 1941, both times at Canterbury Cathedral by Cosmo Gordon Lang, Archbishop of Canterbury.

He began his career with Curacies at Christ Church, Folkestone and Addington Parish Church, Croydon. He was then successively Secretary of the Church Missionary Society, and Vicar of Christ Church, Cheltenham. From 1962–72, he was Vicar of St Andrew's Church, Plymouth, and also Rural Dean of Plymouth between 1967 and 1972.

=== Episcopal ministry ===
On 2 February 1972, Cavell was consecrated a bishop by Michael Ramsey, Archbishop of Canterbury, at Westminster Abbey. He then served as Bishop of Southampton, a suffragan bishop in the Diocese of Winchester. He was also appointed the Bishop of Prisons in June 1975. He retired from full-time ministry on 30 June 1984.

== Later life and death ==
In retirement, Cavell continued to serve the Church of England. From 1988 to 2010, he was an honorary assistant bishop in the Diocese of Salisbury. He was also an honorary canon of Salisbury Cathedral, and was appointed Canon Emeritus in 2010. Cavell turned 100 in November 2016 and died on 19 May 2017.

Church of England titles
Preceded by Kenneth Lamplugh	Bishop of Southampton; 1972–1984	Succeeded by David Cartwright
Preceded by ?	Bishop to HM Prisons and Borstals; 1975–1985	Succeeded by Br Michael (Fisher)
