= Bishop of Chelmsford =

Diocesan bishop in the Church of England

- Bishopric

anglican
- Coat of arms
- Incumbent: Guli Francis-Dehqani

Location
- Ecclesiastical province: Canterbury
- Residence: Bishopscourt, Margaretting

Information
- Established: 1914
- Diocese: Chelmsford
- Cathedral: Chelmsford Cathedral

The Bishop of Chelmsford is the Ordinary of the Church of England Diocese of Chelmsford in the Province of Canterbury.

The current bishop is Guli Francis-Dehqani, since the confirmation of her election on 11 March 2021.

== History ==
The diocese was founded in 1914 under George V from the Diocese of Saint Albans (of which it had been a part since 1877).

The present diocese covers the County of Essex including those parts of Essex added to Greater London on 1 April 1965 and Ballingdon-with-Brundon, transferred to Suffolk and Great/Little Chishill and Heydon, transferred to Cambridgeshire in 1894. The see is in the city of Chelmsford where the seat is located at the Cathedral Church of Saint Mary, Saint Peter and Saint Cedd which was elevated to cathedral status in 1914. The bishop's residence is Bishopscourt, Margaretting.

== List of bishops ==
Bishops of Chelmsford
From	Until	Incumbent	Notes
1914	1923	John Watts Ditchfield	Nominated 18 February; consecrated 24 February 1914; died in office.
1923	1929	Guy Warman	Translated from Truro; nominated 10 September; invested 9 October 1923; translated to Manchester 21 January 1929.
1929	1950	Henry Wilson	Nominated 24 January; consecrated 25 January 1929; resigned 30 November 1950.
1951	1961	Falkner Allison	Nominated 19 December 1950; consecrated 2 February 1951; translated to Winchester 20 December 1961.
1962	1971	John Tiarks	Nominated 30 January; consecrated 24 February 1962; resigned 30 April 1971.
1971	1985	John Trillo	Translated from Hertford; nominated 10 May; confirmed 6 July 1971; resigned 30 September 1985.
1986	1996	John Waine	Translated from St Edmundsbury and Ipswich; nominated & confirmed 1986; resigned 30 April 1996.
1996	2003	John Perry	Translated from Southampton; nominated & confirmed 1996; resigned June 2003.
2003	2009	John Gladwin	Translated from Guildford; nominated 1 July 2003; confirmed later; resigned 31 August 2009.
2010	2020	Stephen Cottrell	Translated from Reading; nominated 22 March; confirmed 6 October 2010. Translated to York on 9 July 2020.
12 April 2020	19 April 2021	Peter Hill, Bishop of Barking	Acting diocesan bishop during vacancy in see
2021	present	Guli Francis-Dehqani	Translated 11 March 2021

== Assistant bishops ==
In 1931, the appointment of Cecil de Carteret, Bishop of Jamaica, to be an assistant bishop was announced, but he died before he could take it up.

Assistant bishops of the diocese have included:

- 1961 – 1966 (res.): Geoffrey Stuart Smith was an assistant bishop; he was also Rector of Danbury from 1960.
- 1972 – 1974: Br John-Charles SSF, former Assistant Bishop of Adelaide and Bishop of Polynesia
- 2023: Saulo Mauricio de Barros was licensed as an honorary assistant bishop.
