= John Gladwin =

British bishop (born 1942)

The Right Reverend John Gladwin
- Bishop of Chelmsford
- Church: Church of England
- Diocese: Diocese of Chelmsford
- In office: 2004 – 31 August 2009 (retirement)
- Predecessor: John Perry
- Successor: Stephen Cottrell
- Previous posts: Bishop of Guildford; 1994–2004; Provost of Sheffield; 1988–1994

Orders
- Ordination: 1967 (deacon); 1968 (priest)
- Consecration: 1994

Personal details
- Born: 30 May 1942 (age 84) Hertford, United Kingdom
- Denomination: Anglicanism
- Spouse: Lydia Adam (m. 1981)
- Education: Churchill College, Cambridge

Member of the House of Lords
- Bishop of Chelmsford; 26 October 2003 – 31 August 2009
- Bishop of Guildford; 26 October 1999 – 26 October 2003

John Warren Gladwin (born 30 May 1942) is a retired Anglican bishop. From 2004 to 2009, he was the Bishop of Chelmsford in the Church of England. He stands in the open evangelical tradition.

== Early life ==
Gladwin was born on 30 May 1942 in Hertford, Hertfordshire, England. He was educated at Hertford Grammar School, an all-boys school in Hertford, Hertfordshire. He studied theology and history at Churchill College, Cambridge (BA 1965, MA 1968). He undertook further theological study and training for ordination at Cranmer Hall, Durham (Diploma in Theology 1969).

== Ordained ministry ==
Gladwin was ordained in the Church of England as a deacon in 1967 and as a priest in 1968. From 1967 to 1971, he served his curacy at St John the Baptist Parish Church, Kirkheaton in the Diocese of Wakefield. He then returned to Durham, where he was a tutor of St John's College, Durham and an honorary chaplain to students at St Nicholas Church, Durham between 1971 and 1977.

From 1977 to 1982, Gladwin was director of the Shaftesbury Project on Christian Involvement in Society: the Shaftesbury Project was an "initiative by evangelical Christians to study their proper involvement in society and to provide a clear understanding of social action". He was secretary of the General Synod's Board for Social Responsibility from 1982 to 1988. He was made a prebendary of St Paul's Cathedral in 1984. From 1988 to 1994, he was Provost of Sheffield, the senior priest of Sheffield Cathedral and the Diocese of Sheffield.

He was ordained a bishop in 1994, and served as Bishop of Guildford from 1994 to 2004 when he was appointed to be Bishop of Chelmsford. He was a member of the House of Lords from 1999 until his retirement in 2009. As the Bishop of Chelmsford, he sought to embrace the vast diversity of the second largest diocese in the Church of England. In late 2008 he announced that he would retire on 31 August 2009. Since 2010, he has held permission to officiate in the Diocese of St Albans.

On 11 February 2017, Gladwin was one of fourteen retired bishops to sign an open letter to the then-serving bishops of the Church of England. In an unprecedented move, they expressed their opposition to the House of Bishops' report to General Synod on sexuality, which recommended no change to the Church's canons or practises around sexuality. By 13 February, a serving bishop (Alan Wilson, Bishop of Buckingham) and nine further retired bishops had added their signatures; on 15 February, the report was rejected by synod.

== Charity work ==
From 1998 to 2008, he was chairman of the board of Christian Aid. His work with Christian Aid took him around the world, where he has seen at first hand the work of many Christians who are committed to working alongside the world's most needy people. He served as chair for 10 years, being succeeded in June 2008 by Anne Owers. On his retirement as bishop, he became the Chairman of Citizens Advice, serving in that role from 2009 to 2015.

== Personal life ==
He married Lydia Elizabeth Adam, daughter of the late William Adam and the late Ivy Amelia Adam in 1981. They married in Christchurch, Fulwood in the Diocese of Sheffield. The preacher was Brandon Jackson, Provost of Bradford. Lydia died in August 2018.

== Publications ==
- God's People in God's World, 1979
- The Good of the People, 1988
- Love and Liberty, 1997

Church of England titles
Preceded by Frank Curtis	Provost of Sheffield; 1988–1994	Succeeded by Michael Sadgrove
Preceded by Michael Adie	Bishop of Guildford; 1994–2004	Succeeded by Christopher Hill
Preceded by John Perry	Bishop of Chelmsford; 2004–2009	Succeeded by Stephen Cottrell
