= John Perry (bishop) =

English bishop (born 1935)

- Bishop of Chelmsford
- Diocese: Diocese of Chelmsford
- In office: 1996–2003
- Predecessor: John Waine
- Successor: John Gladwin
- Other posts: Honorary assistant bishop in Bath & Wells (2011–present); Bishop of Southampton (1989–1996)

Orders
- Ordination: 1959 (deacon); 1960 (priest)
- Consecration: 1989

Personal details
- Born: 15 June 1935 (age 91)
- Denomination: Anglican
- Parents: Richard and Elsie
- Spouse: Gay Brown (m. 1959; d. 2009); Marilyn Sertin (m. 2011)
- Children: 3 sons; 2 daughters (all with first wife)
- Education: London College of Divinity

Member of the House of Lords
- Lord Spiritual
- Bishop of Chelmsford; 5 July 2000 – 30 June 2003

John Freeman Perry (born 15 June 1935) is a retired Anglican bishop.

Perry was educated at Mill Hill School, the London College of Divinity and St John's College, Nottingham. He was made a deacon at Michaelmas 1959 (20 September) and ordained a priest the Michaelmas following (25 September 1960) – both times by Ivor Watkins, Bishop of Guildford, at Holy Trinity Pro-Cathedral, Guildford. After ordination he was a curate at Christ Church, Woking until 1962, after which he held a similar post at Christ Church, Chorleywood before becoming vicar of St Andrew's in the same town in 1963; and in 1972 Rural Dean of Rickmansworth. From 1977 until 1989 he was Warden of Lee Abbey when he was appointed Bishop of Southampton, a suffragan bishop of the Diocese of Winchester. He took up that See upon his consecration as bishop by Robert Runcie, Archbishop of Canterbury, on 25 January 1989 at Westminster Abbey. Translated to Chelmsford in 1996 he was awarded an honorary doctorate by Anglia Ruskin University in 2001 and retired to Shaftesbury two years later.

Church of England titles
Preceded by David Cartwright	Bishop of Southampton; 1989–1996	Succeeded by Jonathan Gledhill
Preceded by John Waine	Bishop of Chelmsford; 1996–2003	Succeeded by John Gladwin
