= James Jones (bishop) =

Church of England bishop (born 1948)

The Right Reverend James Jones KBE
- Bishop of Liverpool
- Church: Church of England
- Diocese: Diocese of Liverpool
- Installed: 1998
- Term ended: 18 August 2013 (retirement)
- Predecessor: David Sheppard
- Successor: Paul Bayes
- Other posts: Bishop to HM Prisons (2007–2013); Bishop of Hull (1994–1998)

Orders
- Ordination: 1982
- Consecration: 1994

Personal details
- Born: 18 August 1948 (age 78)
- Denomination: Anglican
- Residence: Bishop's Lodge, Liverpool
- Parents: Maj Stuart & Helen Jones
- Spouse: Sarah Marrow (m. 1980)
- Children: 3 daughters
- Profession: formerly teacher
- Education: Exeter University

Member of the House of Lords
- Lord Spiritual
- Bishop of Liverpool; 20 October 2003 – 31 August 2013

James Stuart Jones KBE (born 18 August 1948) is a retired Church of England bishop. He was the Bishop of Liverpool between 1998 and 2013.

== Early life ==
Jones is the son of Major Stuart Jones and Helen Jones. He was educated at the Duke of York's Royal Military School, Dover and Exeter University, where he received a Bachelor of Arts degree in theology in 1970. He was further educated at Alsager College, Keele (where he graduated with a Postgraduate Certificate in Education (PGCE) in drama and religious education in 1971) and Wycliffe Hall, Oxford (1981).

== Religious career ==
From 1971 to 1974, Jones was a teacher at Sevenoaks School and led one of the first community service programmes in schools. He was also co-founder of the first Volunteer Bureau in England. Between 1975 and 1981, he was producer at Scripture Union. He was then a curate, then associate vicar of Christ Church, Clifton Down in the Diocese of Bristol. Jones was visiting lecturer in media studies at Trinity College, Bristol and, from 1990 to 1994, the vicar of Emmanuel Church, South Croydon in the Diocese of Southwark and the Bishop of Southwark's examining chaplain. In 1994, he became Suffragan Bishop of Hull in the Diocese of York, a post he held until 1998 when he was appointed the 7th Bishop of Liverpool.

Jones is an Evangelical and was one of the group of bishops who signed a letter opposing Rowan Williams' decision not to block the appointment of Jeffrey John as Bishop of Reading. The other diocesan bishop signatories were: Michael Scott-Joynt (Bishop of Winchester), Michael Langrish (Exeter), Michael Nazir-Ali (Rochester), Peter Forster (Chester), George Cassidy (Southwell & Nottingham), Graham Dow (Carlisle), John Hind (Chichester) and David James (Bradford). In 2008, Jones apologised for opposing the gay cleric.

Jones was also Chair of Council at Wycliffe Hall, Oxford, when the college suffered much publicity because of allegations of bullying against its principal, Richard Turnbull. The majority of the academic staff left the college and wrote to the Church Times expressing grave dissatisfaction at the failure of the council (under Jones as chair) to allow mediation and address substantive issues. Former principals wrote to the press to object at the way the council and chair had handled the issue. A member of the council also resigned in protest, having "no confidence in the Chair, the Principal or the Council".

In 2008, the college was taken to an employment tribunal for unfair dismissal. They admitted breaking the law and had to pay damages. In 2009, Bishop Jones resigned and was replaced as Council Chair by the Bishop of Chester. On 28 January 2013, it was announced that Jones would retire as Bishop of Liverpool on his 65th birthday on 18 August. He was subsequently licensed as an honorary assistant bishop in the diocese of York.

== Independent panel chair ==
In December 2009 it was announced that Jones would chair the panel relating to the Hillsborough Disaster in which eventually saw 97 Liverpool football fans died.

In 2012, Jones and Sir Henry Studholme, as chairman and deputy chairman respectively, conducted the Independent Forestry Panel report on the future of the UK's state-owned forests after the government announced plans to sell off the British state forests.

Jones chaired the Gosport Independent Panel, an independent panel which wrote a report published on 20 June 2018, which found that 456 deaths at the Gosport War Memorial Hospital in Hampshire, England, in the 1990s had "followed inappropriate administration of opioid drugs". In his introduction, the bishop says:

The shocking outcome of the Panel’s work is that we have now been able to conclude that the lives of over 450 patients were shortened while in the hospital ... during a certain period at Gosport War Memorial Hospital, there was a disregard for human life and a culture of shortening the lives of a large number of patients by prescribing and administering "dangerous doses" of a hazardous combination of medication not clinically indicated or justified ... when relatives complained about the safety of patients and the appropriateness of their care, they were consistently let down by those in authority – both individuals and institutions...

== Personal life ==
Jones married Sarah Marrow in 1980 and they have three daughters.

Jones was appointed Knight Commander of the Order of the British Empire (KBE) in the 2017 New Year Honours for services to bereaved families and justice.

== Styles ==
- James Jones Esq (1948–1982)
- The Revd James Jones (1982–1994)
- The Rt Revd James Jones (1994–2017)
- The Rt Revd Sir James Jones KBE (2017 to date)

Church of England titles
Preceded by Donald Snelgrove	Bishop of Hull; 1994–1998	Succeeded by Richard Frith
Preceded by David Sheppard	Bishop of Liverpool; 1998–2013	Succeeded by Paul Bayes
Preceded by Peter Selby	Bishop to HM Prisons; 2007–2013	Succeeded by James Langstaff, Bishop of Rochester
