= Evered Lunt =

Rt Rev Francis Evered Lunt (15 October 1900 – 27 May 1982) was the 9th Anglican Bishop of Stepney from 1957.

Born in Liverpool, Lunt initially trained for ministry at London College of Divinity being ordained deacon in 1925 and priest in 1927, beginning his ordained ministry as a curate at Maidenhead. He subsequently graduated from University College, Durham and from the University of Cambridge. becoming in turn Chaplain of Downing College, Cambridge, and Vicar of St Aldate's, Oxford. He became Dean of Bristol in 1951, and served there until his consecration to the episcopate in 1957. He was elected a Fellow of Downing College, Cambridge in 1966.

An Evangelical in churchmanship, as his appointments show, much of his career saw him involved with providing spiritual care to students through the Cambridge and Oxford Pastorates. He nonetheless maintained friendships with clergy of other ecclesiastical leanings, most notably with John AT Robinson the author of Honest to God, whose views caused controversy among more traditional believers. He was also a close friend of the staunchly Evangelical Thomas Sherwood Jones, who, at age 85 was among the bishops who participated in Lunt's consecration and would become in due course one of the few English bishops to achieve centenarian status.

Although many Bishops of Stepney have gone on to higher office in the Church of England, and Lunt's career in the Church had involved a number of distinguished appointments, his comparatively late elevation to the episcopate - and relatively low profile in comparison to his immediate predecessor and indeed successor - may have militated against his translation to a more senior position and even contributed to the nickname "Evered the Unready" his clergy gave him. One of his contributions to Church life was an interest in ministry to the deaf, and in 1963 he presided over one of the first televised services which was also translated into sign language.

He also supported Cicely Saunders in persuading various London authorities of a need for support of the terminally ill through the hospice movement., and was instrumental in the setting up of St Christopher's Hospice in South London, as the following excerpt from its history shows:

"Soon a small but enthusiastic group of supporters had been formed, including: Dr Glyn Hughes (author of a recent report on the state of terminal care in Britain); Betty Read (head almoner at St Thomas’s Hospital); and Jack Wallace (an evangelical friend and lawyer). It was then joined by Evered Lunt (Anglican Bishop of Stepney); Sir Kenneth Grubb (of the Church Missionary Society); and, very significantly, Dame Albertine Winner (Deputy Chief Medical Officer). Led by their enthusiasms and the inspiration and energy of Cicely Saunders herself, they set about raising funds to bring the enterprise to realisation...".

Lunt retired from active ministry in 1968, and lived near Bognor Regis until his death in 1982.

Church of England titles
Preceded by Joost de Blank	Bishop of Stepney; 1957 –1968	Succeeded by Trevor Huddleston
