= Bob Hardy (bishop) =

Bishop of Lincoln (1936–2021)

The Right Reverend Bob Hardy CBE
- Bishop of Lincoln
- Church: Church of England
- Diocese: Diocese of Lincoln
- In office: 1987–2001
- Predecessor: Simon Phipps
- Successor: John Saxbee
- Other posts: Honorary assistant bishop in Carlisle (2001–2021); Bishop to HM Prisons (1985–2001); Bishop of Maidstone (1980–1987)

Orders
- Ordination: 1962 (deacon); 1963 (priest)
- Consecration: 1980

Personal details
- Born: 5 October 1936
- Died: 9 April 2021 (aged 84)
- Denomination: Anglican
- Parents: Harold & Monica
- Spouse: Isobel Burch (m. 1970)
- Children: 2 sons; 1 daughter
- Education: Clare College, Cambridge

Member of the House of Lords
- Lord Spiritual
- Bishop of Lincoln; 2 February 1993 – 31 October 2001

Robert Maynard Hardy CBE (5 October 1936 – 9 April 2021) was an Anglican bishop in the Church of England.

== Early life ==
Hardy was born on 5 October 1936. He was educated at Queen Elizabeth Grammar School, Wakefield and Clare College, Cambridge.

== Career ==
Hardy trained for ordination at Cuddesdon College, and was ordained deacon in 1962 and priest in 1963. His first position was at All Saints and Martyrs' Church, Langley, Manchester, after which he became a chaplain (and fellow) of Selwyn College, Cambridge. Following this he was appointed Vicar of Borehamwood then Director of the St Albans Diocese Ministerial Training Scheme. In 1980 he was ordained to the episcopate as the Bishop of Maidstone. In 1987 he was translated to be the Bishop of Lincoln. He retired in 2001, resigning his See effective 31 October. He also served as Bishop to HM Prisons, 1985–2001.

== Later life ==
In retirement, from 2001, he continued to serve as an honorary assistant bishop in the Diocese of Carlisle, while living at Langwathby, Cumbria.

On 16 June 2001, as part of that year's Queen's Birthday Honours, he was appointed a Commander of the Order of the British Empire "for services to the Church of England, and to Prisoners".

Church of England titles
| Preceded by Richard Third | Bishop of Maidstone; 1980–1987 | Succeeded by David Smith |
| Preceded by Br Michael (Fisher) | Bishop to HM Prisons; 1985–2001 | Succeeded by Peter Selby |
| Preceded by Simon Phipps | Bishop of Lincoln; 1987–2001 | Succeeded by John Saxbee |
