= Peter Selby =

British Anglican bishop (born 1941)

The Right Reverend Peter Selby
- Bishop of Worcester
- Church: Church of England
- Diocese: Diocese of Worcester
- In office: 1997–2007
- Predecessor: Philip Goodrich
- Successor: John Inge
- Other posts: Bishop to HM Prisons; 2001–2007
- Previous posts: Honorary assistant bishop in Durham and Newcastle; 1992–1997; Bishop of Kingston; 1984–1992 (area bishop 1991–1992)

Orders
- Ordination: 1966
- Consecration: 1984

Personal details
- Born: 7 December 1941 (age 84)
- Denomination: Anglican
- Profession: Theologian and liturgist
- Education: St John's College, Oxford

Member of the House of Lords
- Lord Spiritual
- Bishop of Worcester; 5 November 2002 – 30 September 2007

Peter Stephen Maurice Selby (born 7 December 1941) is a retired British Anglican bishop. He was the Church of England Bishop of Worcester from 1997 until he retired at the end of September 2007.

== Education ==
He was educated at St John's College, Oxford, and at Episcopal Theological School in Cambridge, Massachusetts, taking the Oxford degree of MA (Oxon) (1967, BA 1964) and the Cambridge, Massachusetts, degree of BD (1966). He was awarded a PhD degree from King's College London in 1975.

== Ecclesiastical career ==
Selby was ordained in the Church of England as a deacon in 1966 and as a priest in 1967. He served his curacy at All Saints'Queensbury, in the Diocese of London, between 1966 and 1968. He was then associate director of training for the Diocese of Southwark from 1969 to 1973; vice-principal of the Southwark Ordination Course from 1970 to 1972; and then assistant missioner for the Diocese of Southwark from 1973 to 1977. He also served as assistant curate of Church of St Peter, Limpsfield from 1969 to 1977. From 1977 to 1984, he was a canon residentiary of Newcastle Cathedral and diocesan missioner for the Diocese of Newcastle.

Selby was consecrated a bishop in 1984. He served as Bishop of Kingston, a suffragan bishop in the Diocese of Southwark, from 1984 to 1992; he was an area bishop from 1991. In 1992, he joined Durham University as William Leech Professorial Fellow in Applied Christian Theology. He was also an honorary assistant bishop in the dioceses of Durham and of Newcastle during this time. In 1997, he returned to full-time ministry having been appointed Bishop of Worcester, the diocesan bishop of the Diocese of Worcester. He was additionally the Bishop to HM Prisons between 2001 and 2007. He retired in 2007.

Visitor General, Community of the Sisters of the Church, 1991–2001, a Member of the Doctrine Commission, 1991–2003, and President of the Modern Churchpeople's Union, 1990–96 and of the Society for Study of Theology, 2003–04; and from January 2008 became the President of the National Council for Independent Monitoring Boards for prisons.

== The Charles Raven affair ==
Selby had disagreed with the 1998 Lambeth agreement that bishops would not ordain homosexuals as clergy. In 2002 he was asked to affirm this by one of his own clergymen, Charles Raven, the vicar of St. John's Church, Kidderminster. Selby refused to do so, and was therefore asked not to come to the church to confirm people, since there would be no agreement as to what the faith being confirmed was. As Raven's licence was not renewable he had to leave his post, and founded a breakaway congregation, taking with him about half the members of the church he had served. The story made the national press several times.

== Retirement ==
Selby and John Saxbee were appointed Episcopal Patrons of the international No Anglican Covenant Coalition in July 2011. In a joint letter to the Church Times, Saxbee and Selby warned that "this is a time to hold fast to Anglicanism’s inherited culture of inclusion and respectful debate which is our way of dealing with difference rather than require assent to procedures and words that have already shown themselves to be divisive."

Since retirement Selby served for five years as President of the National Council for Independent Monitoring Boards, the Boards monitoring fairness and respect for those in custody. He retired from that post in 2013, and has since been an interim co-director of St Paul's Institute, the cathedral's agency that dialogues with the financial sector in the City of London.

On 11 February 2017, Selby was one of fourteen retired bishops to sign an open letter to the then-serving bishops of the Church of England. In an unprecedented move, they expressed their opposition to the House of Bishops' report to General Synod on sexuality, which recommended no change to the Church's canons or practises around sexuality. By 13 February, a serving bishop (Alan Wilson, Bishop of Buckingham) and nine further retired bishops had added their signatures; on 15 February, the report was rejected by synod.

== Styles ==
- The Reverend Peter Selby (1966–1975)
- The Reverend Doctor Peter Selby (1975–1977)
- The Reverend Canon Doctor Peter Selby (1977–1984)
- The Right Reverend Doctor Peter Selby (1984–1992; 1997–present)
- The Right Reverend Professor Peter Selby (1992–1997)

== Bibliography ==
- 'Grace and Mortgage: Language of Faith and the Debt of the World', Peter Selby, Publ. Darton, Longman & Todd Ltd (1997) ISBN 0-232-52170-0
- 'Rescue: Jesus and Salvation Today', Peter Selby, Publ. Society for Promoting Christian Knowledge (1996) ISBN 0-687-06605-0

Church of England titles
Preceded by Keith Sutton	Bishop of Kingston; 1984–1992	Succeeded by Martin Wharton
Preceded by Philip Goodrich	Bishop of Worcester; 1997–2007	Succeeded by John Inge
Preceded by Robert Hardy	Bishop to HM Prisons; 2001–2007	Succeeded by James Jones
Non-profit organization positions
Preceded by Edward Carpenter	President of the Modern Churchpeople's Union; 1990 – c. 1997	Succeeded by John Saxbee
