= Edmund Morgan (bishop) =

British Anglican bishop (1888–1979)

Edmund Robert Morgan (28 July 1888 – 21 September 1979) was the seventh Bishop suffragan of Southampton; and afterwards the ninth diocesan Bishop of Truro.

He was born on 28 July 1888 and educated at Winchester and New College, Oxford. Ordained in 1914, he began his career with curacies at Farnham and Eastleigh. He was then Chaplain to Edward Talbot, Bishop of Winchester, and after that Warden of the College of the Ascension, Selly Oak, Birmingham, for 13 years from 1923. From 1930 to 1936 he was also assistant secretary of the Society for the Propagation of the Gospel. From 1936 to 1943 he was Rector of Old Alresford and also Archdeacon of Winchester, a post he held until his elevation to the episcopate. A noted author, he died on 21 September 1979 aged 91 at Whiteparish.

Church of England titles
Preceded by Arthur Karney	Bishop of Southampton; 1943–1951	Succeeded by Kenneth Lamplugh
Preceded by Joseph Hunkin	Bishop of Truro; 1951–1960	Succeeded by Maurice Key
