= Joost de Blank =

Dutch-born British Anglican bishop (1908–1968)

- Archbishop of Cape Town
- Archbishop Joost de Blank
- Church: Anglican
- Province: Southern Africa
- Metropolis: Cape Town
- In office: 1957–1963
- Predecessor: Geoffrey Clayton
- Successor: Robert Selby Taylor
- Other post: Bishop of Stepney (1952–1957)

Orders
- Ordination: 1932
- Consecration: 1952

Personal details
- Born: 14 November 1908 Rotterdam, South Holland, Netherlands
- Died: 1 January 1968 (aged 59) City of Westminster, Greater London, United Kingdom
- Buried: Westminster Abbey
- Education: Merchant Taylors' School
- Alma mater: Queens' College, Cambridge; King's College London; Ridley Hall, Cambridge

Joost de Blank (14 November 1908 – 1 January 1968) was a Dutch-born British Anglican bishop. He was the Archbishop of Cape Town, South Africa from 1957 to 1963 and was known as the "scourge of apartheid" for his ardent opposition to the whites-only policies of the South African government.

== Education ==
De Blank was born in Rotterdam, Netherlands, on 14 November 1908, he became a British subject as a child in 1921. He was educated at Merchant Taylors' School, King's College London, and Queens' College, Cambridge.

== England ==
He was ordained after a period of study at Ridley Hall, Cambridge in 1932 and began his career as a curate in Bath. De Blank held incumbencies at Forest Gate and Greenhill, Harrow. During World War II he was an army chaplain.

In 1952 he was appointed the Bishop of Stepney in the Diocese of London and continued in this post until he was translated to Cape Town. During this bishopric, de Blank visited Ruth Ellis in prison just before she was hanged, for the murder of David Blakeley in 1955, when she told him, "It is quite clear to me that I was not the person who shot him. When I saw myself with the revolver I knew I was another person." These comments were quoted in a London evening paper of the time, The Star.

== South Africa ==
He succeeded Geoffrey Clayton as Archbishop of Cape Town in 1957. In South Africa, he refused to preach in any church not open to blacks as well as whites. He opposed clause 29 of Natives Law Amendment Bill, which gave the civil authorities powers to exclude non-whites from Anglican churches.

In 1960 De Blank called on the Dutch Reformed Church in South Africa (NGK) to repudiate apartheid, and in the same year criticised the South African jubilee celebrations: "This is no time for rejoicing, but for shame". He suffered a stroke which caused him to resign from Cape Town in 1963 and return to Britain. There he was appointed a residentiary canon of Westminster Abbey, where he was buried after his death in Westminster on 1 January 1968.

== Honours and awards ==
- Appointed a sub-prelate of the Venerable Order of Saint John in 1952.
- Appointed canon of Westminster Abbey in 1964.

== Styles ==
- The Reverend Joost de Blank (1932–1952)
- The Right Reverend Joost de Blank (1952–1957 & 1963–1968)
- The Most Reverend Joost de Blank (1957–1963)

== Publications ==
- Inter-race relationships. Council of Christians and Jews. 1964.
- Uncomfortable words. Longmans, Green. 1958.
- Out of Africa. (Lectures, Sermons and Addresses Delivered by Bishop Joost de Blank when Archbishop of Cape Town.). London. 1964.

== Notes and references ==
- Peart-Binns, John Stuart (1987). Archbishop Joost de Blank: Scourge of Apartheid. Muller, Blond & White. ISBN 978-0-584-11130-9.
- De Blank, Bartha (1977). Joost de Blank: A Personal Memoir. Boydell Press. ISBN 978-0-85115-082-6.
- Allen, John (2006). Rabble-Rouser for Peace: The Authorized Biography of Desmond Tutu. Simon and Schuster. ISBN 978-0-7432-9866-7.
- De Gruchy, John W. (2005). The Church Struggle in South Africa. Fortress Press. ISBN 978-0-8006-3755-2.
- Paine, Victor C. (1978). The Confrontation Between the Archbishop of Cape Town, Joost de Blank, and the South African Government on Racial Policies, (1957-1963). University of Cape Town.
- Anon (18 January 1964). "Joost de Blank: a farewell interview". The New African. 3 (1): 22–23. Archived from the original on 21 June 2015.

Church of England titles
Preceded by Robert Moberly	Bishop of Stepney; 1952–1957	Succeeded by Evered Lunt
Anglican Church of Southern Africa titles
Preceded by Geoffrey Clayton	Archbishop of Cape Town; 1957–1963	Succeeded by Robert Selby Taylor
