= David Cartwright =

Anglican Bishop of Southampton (1920–1997)

The Rt Revd David Cartwright MA(Cantab)
- Bishop of Southampton
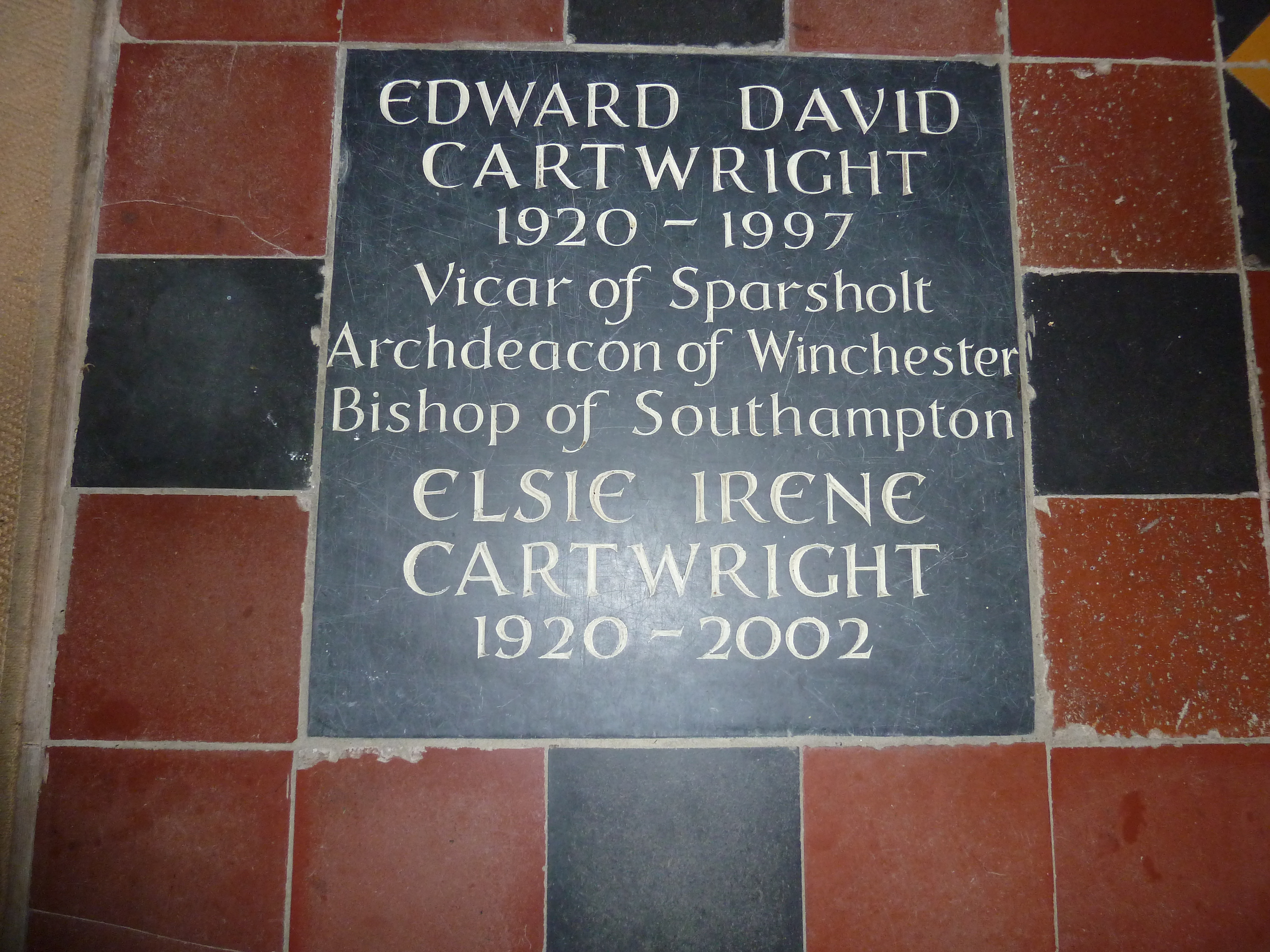
- Cartwright's memorial at St Stephen's Sparsholt.
- Diocese: Diocese of Winchester
- In office: 1984–1989
- Predecessor: John Cavell
- Successor: John Perry
- Other post: Archdeacon of Winchester (1973–1984)

Orders
- Ordination: 1943 (deacon); 1944 (priest)
- Consecration: 1984

Personal details
- Born: 15 July 1920
- Died: 24 April 1997 (aged 76)
- Denomination: Anglican
- Parents: John Edward Cartwright & Gertrude Lusby
- Spouse: Elsie Rogers (m. 1946)
- Children: 1 son; 2 daughters
- Education: Selwyn College, Cambridge

Edward David Cartwright (15 July 1920 – 24 April 1997) was the tenth Suffragan Bishop of Southampton.

Cartwright was educated at Lincoln Grammar School and Selwyn College, Cambridge. Ordained in 1944, he began his career with a curacy in Boston, Lincolnshire and was then Vicar of St Leonard's, Redfield, Bristol. After that he held further incumbencies at Olveston, Bishopston and Sparsholt and was then Archdeacon of Winchester before appointment to the episcopate, a post he held from 1984 until 1989.

Church of England titles
| Preceded by John Cavell | Bishop of Southampton; 1984–1989 | Succeeded by John Perry |
