= Gosport War Memorial Hospital 1990s opioid deaths scandal =

United Kingdom healthcare Scandal

The Gosport War Memorial Hospital 1990s opioid deaths scandal arose from the premature shortening of life of over 400 patients at Gosport War Memorial Hospital, Hampshire, England by use of opioid drugs and apparent failures by relevant authorities to detect the issue in a timely manner and for subsequent inadequate investigations into the issues.

== History ==
In August 1998, following the death of Gladys Richards who had gone into Gosport War Memorial Hospital for rehab following a hip operation, her family reported concerns about her treatment to the police and to the coroner. In the next three years, more families of deceased patients came forward. Following three police investigations, a Commission for Health Improvement investigation, a General Medical Council inquiry, the Council for Healthcare Regulatory Excellence review and inquests into eleven deaths at the hospital, there still remained unanswered questions for the families as to what really happened to their relatives and to the conduct of the different investigations. As a result, the then health minister Norman Lamb set up the Gosport Independent Panel led by Bishop James Jones in July 2014.

On 20 June 2018, after an enquiry, which took four years and cost £14 million, the Gosport Independent Panel published a report which found that 456 deaths in the 1990s had "followed inappropriate administration of opioid drugs". In his introduction, Bishop James Jones says:

The shocking outcome of the Panel’s work is that we have now been able to conclude that the lives of over 450 patients were shortened while in the hospital ... during a certain period at Gosport War Memorial Hospital, there was a disregard for human life and a culture of shortening the lives of a large number of patients by prescribing and administering “dangerous doses” of a hazardous combination of medication not clinically indicated or justified ... when relatives complained about the safety of patients and the appropriateness of their care, they were consistently let down by those in authority – both individuals and institutions...

If the similar cases with missing records are taken into account, the true number of victims may be up to 650. Other figures show that 70% of the victims were not admitted for terminal care, so their deaths were unexpected, with most living only two days or less after being administered the drug. Nurses' concerns were repeatedly ignored.

The panel found that the hospital management, local healthcare organisations, Hampshire Constabulary, the Crown Prosecution Service, the General Medical Council, the Nursing and Midwifery Council, and local politicians had all failed to act to protect patients and their families. According to Prof Sir Brian Jarman, an expert on hospital mortality at the Dr Foster Unit at Imperial College London, the Gosport accident may be repeated because of NHS continued blame culture in pressuring or even firing whistleblowers.

The deaths were investigated for an episode of Panorama shown on 21 January 2019.

Steve Watts, former assistant chief constable at Hampshire Constabulary, who led the investigation into 94 of the deaths, declared on 21 January 2019: "I think the evidence is strong enough now, I think it was strong enough then [14 years ago]".

Assistant Chief Constable Nick Downing, head of the Serious Crime Directorate for Kent and Essex Police, announced on 30 April 2019 that a new criminal investigation into the deaths was to take place.
