= St Mary's Cathedral, Johannesburg =

St Mary's Cathedral
- Cathedral of St Mary the Virgin
- St Mary's Cathedral
- 26°11′58″S 28°2′40″E
- Location: Johannesburg
- Country: South Africa
- Denomination: Anglican
- Churchmanship: Anglo-Catholic

History
- Founded: 1887
- Dedication: St Mary the Virgin
- Consecrated: 29 September 1929

Architecture
- Architect(s): Sir Herbert Baker and Frank Fleming
- Style: Romanesque-Italian

Specifications
- Capacity: over 2000
- Height: Five storeys high
- Materials: concrete and stone

Administration
- Province: Southern Africa
- Diocese: Johannesburg
- Archdeaconry: Archdeaconry 10
- Parish: Johannesburg

Clergy
- Bishop: Sepadi Moruthane
- Dean: Meshack Mariri

Saint Mary's Cathedral, officially the Cathedral Church of Saint Mary the Virgin, is the cathedral of the Anglican Diocese of Johannesburg, South Africa. In late 2015 Xolani Dlwati was appointed as the dean until 27th of November 2022. The Venerable LT Mariri was installed on the 7th of December 2024.

== History ==
In 1887, the Reverend John Darragh was appointed rector of the first Saint Mary's Church. A block of land was purchased near Plein, De Villiers, and Wanderers Streets in Johannesburg, where the Chapel of Saint John Chrysostom was built. The plans of the cathedral were commissioned from the firm of Sir Herbert Baker, with Frank Fleming as architect in charge. In 1921 the Chapel of All Souls was completed and on 13 May 1926 the construction of the main body of the cathedral commenced. The cathedral was completed and was consecrated on the Feast of Saint Michael and All Angels, 29 September 1929.

The first bishop was Arthur Karney, whose name is to be found on the foundation stone.

In the 1950s, St Mary's was one of the few racially integrated churches in downtown Johannesburg.

The cathedral is famous for its strong ties to the struggle against apartheid. The dean Gonville ffrench-Beytagh was convicted under South Africa's notorious anti-terrorism legislation. After his successful appeal against his conviction, he immediately left South Africa to go into permanent exile.

In 1975 Desmond Tutu was appointed as the cathedral's first black dean.

On 13 February 1982 the funeral of medical doctor and union organiser Neil Aggett, who had died at the hands of the South African Police Security Branch in Johannesburg, was held at the cathedral, attended by around 2,000 people. Around 15,000 mourners attended the funeral procession, including Bishop Tutu.

In April 1993 the body of Oliver Tambo lay in state in the cathedral before he was laid to rest in Benoni.

== Description ==
As one enters at the west door one is immediately confronted with the full beauty of the cathedral, which is built in hard local whinstone to the designs of Mr F L H Fleming and Sir Herbert Baker.

The cathedral has three chapels: the chapel of Saint John Chrysostom; All Souls Chapel, which commemorates South Africans who fell in the Great War; and the Chapel of the Holy Spirit, where the Blessed Sacrament is reserved in a tabernacle. The cathedral has two statues of the Madonna, one stands next to the pulpit, another at the entrance of the All Souls Chapel called Mamasoabi (Our Lady of Sorrows). In the chancel which is at the east end of the cathedral, the high altar with a baldachin forms part of a memorial to John Darragh, the first rector of St Mary's, a huge rood featuring Jesus on his cross, flanked by St. John, Mary, a Roman soldier and Mary Magdalene. The rood also bears the Latin inscription Vere Filius Dei Erat Iste (This Truly was the Son of God). The famous hanging rood which hangs above the chancel steps and dominates the whole church is an almost life size wood carving of the Crucifixion. It was designed and constructed by Baden-Beadle, and was hung in 1957 as a memorial to William Palmer who was dean from 1924 to 1951.In 1983, the Stations of the Cross for St. Mary's Anglican Cathedral in Johannesburg were commissioned and created by Cecil Skotnes. They are hung on the walls of the nave of the cathedral

== Notable people ==
=== Clergy ===
- Arthur Karney
- John Darragh
- Gonville ffrench-Beytagh
- Desmond Tutu
- Thabo Makgoba

=== Parishioners ===
- Helen Joseph
- Oliver Tambo
