= Joseph Hunkin (bishop) =

British bishop

- Bishop of Truro
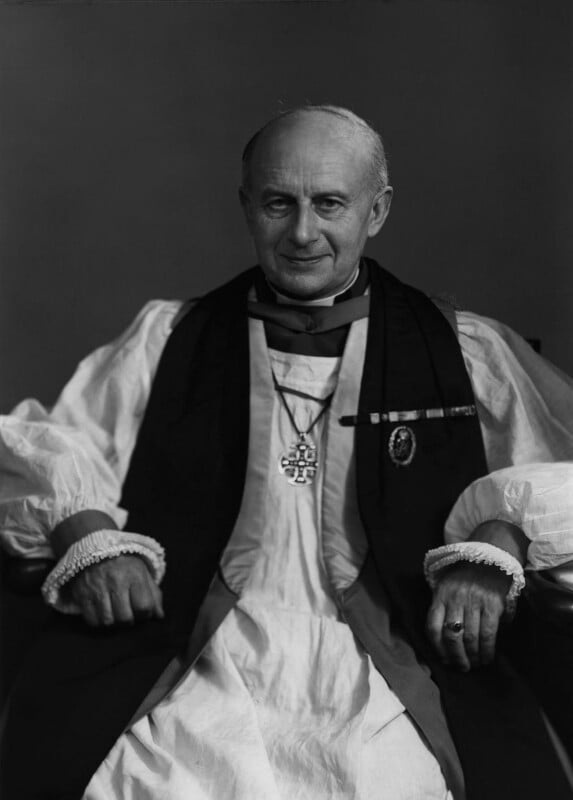
- Hunkin in 1950
- Diocese: Diocese of Truro
- In office: 1935–1950
- Predecessor: Walter Frere
- Successor: Edward Morgan

Orders
- Ordination: 1914 (curate);

Personal details
- Born: 25 September 1887 Truro, Cornwall
- Died: 28 October 1950 (aged 63)
- Denomination: Anglican
- Education: Gonville and Caius College, Cambridge

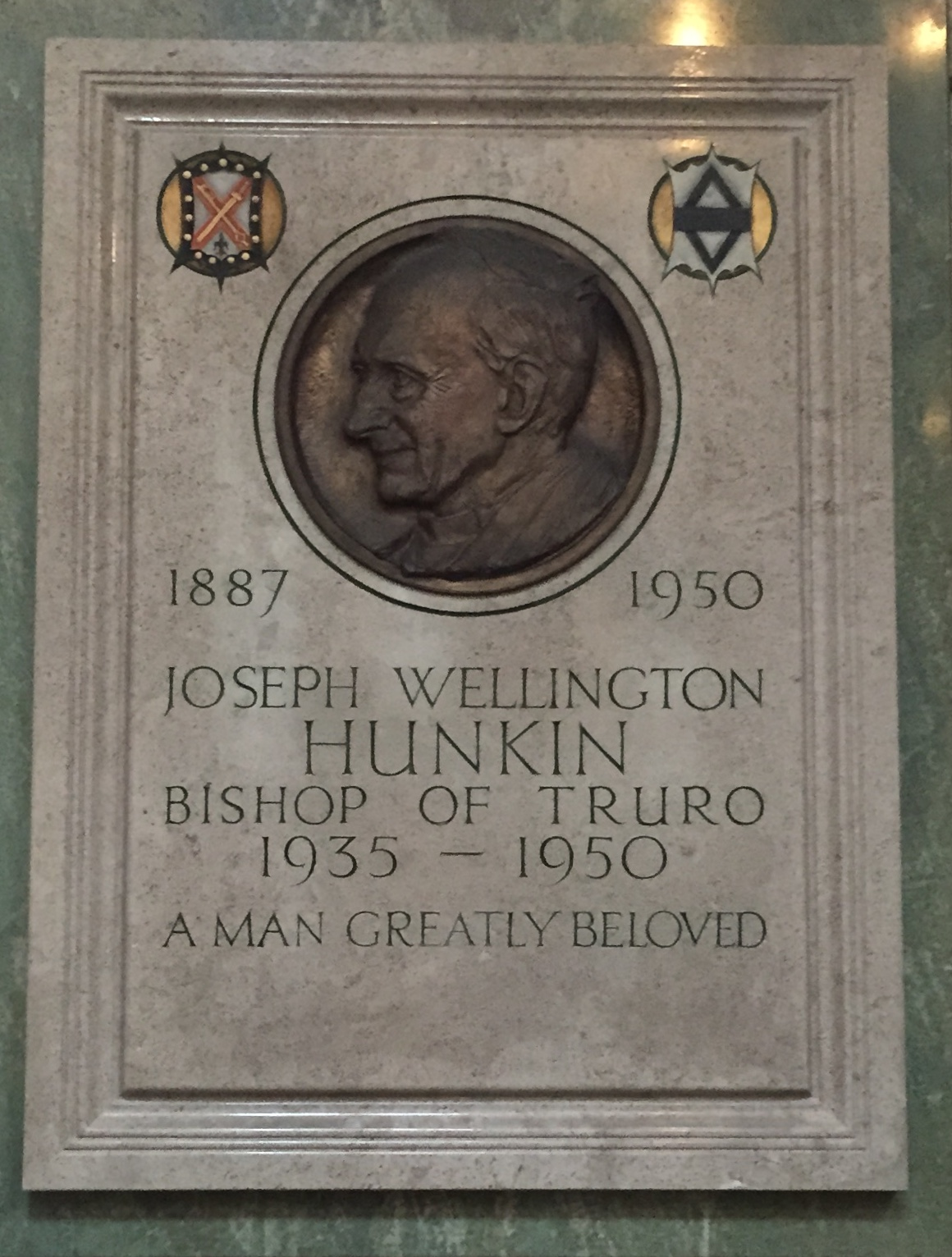
Memorial in Truro Cathedral

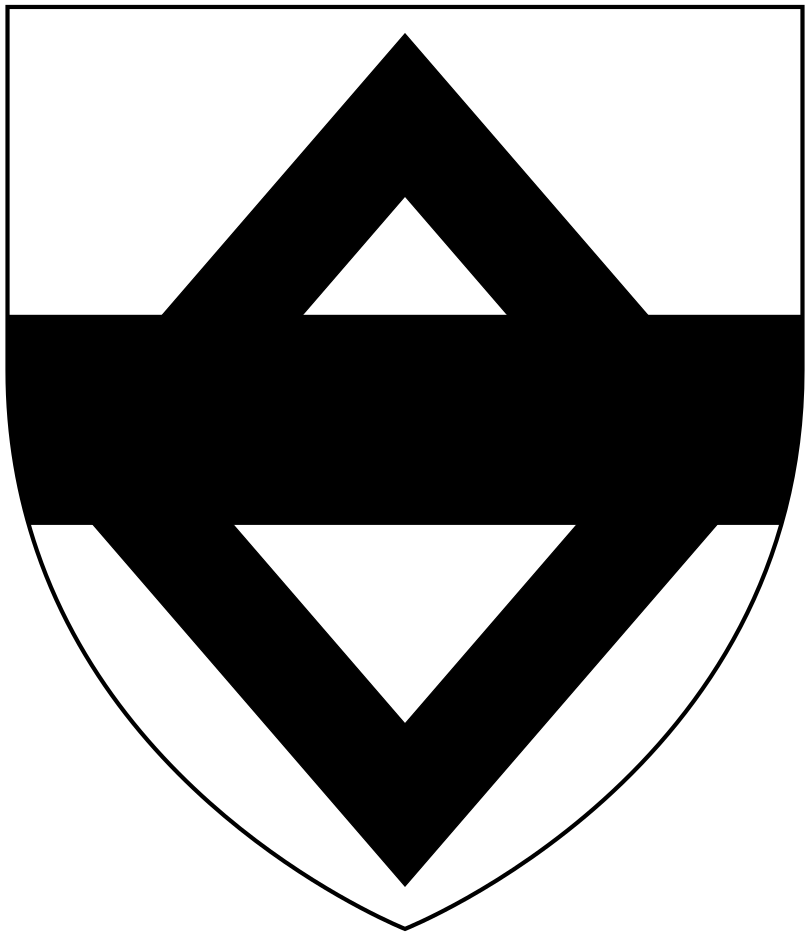
Arms of Hunkin: Argent, a mascle sable over all a fess of the last

Joseph Wellington Hunkin OBE MC (25 September 1887 – 28 October 1950) was the eighth Bishop of Truro from 1935 to 1950.

He was born on 25 September 1887 at Truro and educated at Truro College, the Leys School and Gonville and Caius College, Cambridge. Made deacon on St Matthew's Day 1913 (21 September) and ordained priest at Michaelmas 1914 (27 September) — both times by Archibald Robertson, Bishop of Exeter, at Exeter Cathedral, he began his career with a curacy at St Andrew's, Plymouth. He was then a chaplain in the British Armed Forces during World War I and after that Dean of Chapel at Caius (his undergraduate college). From 1927 until his ascension to the episcopate he was Archdeacon of Coventry and an Honorary Chaplain to the King. He was consecrated a bishop by Cosmo Lang, Archbishop of Canterbury, at St Paul's Cathedral on Whit Tuesday 1935 (11 June). In 1938 he volunteered to be chaplain to the British Legion Volunteer Police Force.

He died on 28 October 1950. He was a strong Evangelical and noted for his pastoral work. He was the chair of a commission to produce a new English translation of the Bible from 1948 to 1950. Hunkin used as his pastoral staff a shepherd's crook of iron with a wooden shaft bound with a silver band inscribed "Un para, un bugel" (Cornish for "One flock, one shepherd") and enlisted in the Home Guard during the Second World War. A keen gardener, he was commemorated by a garden in the cathedral close and a shrub donated to every parish. He had become a Doctor of Divinity (DD).

== Writings ==
Among his published works,

- Is it Reasonable to Believe? (1935) London: Hodder & Stoughton.
- From a Cornish Bishop's Garden (2001), Penzance: Alison Hodge – a collection of newspaper articles from The Guardian, (an Anglican weekly newspaper) edited and introduced by Douglas Pett.

Church of England titles
Preceded by Walter Frere	Bishop of Truro; 1935–1950	Succeeded by Edmund Morgan
