= Bishop of Southampton =

Suffragan bishop of the Church of England

The Bishop of Southampton is an episcopal title used by a suffragan bishop of the Church of England Diocese of Winchester, in the Province of Canterbury, England. The title takes its name after the city of Southampton in Hampshire. The suffragan bishop has particular oversight of the Archdeaconry of Bournemouth, which since a diocesan reorganisation in 2000 constitutes the southern half of the diocese including Bournemouth and Southampton.

On 20 May 2021, it was reported that Tim Dakin, Bishop of Winchester, had "stepped back" as Bishop for six weeks, in light of the threat of a Diocesan Synod motion of no confidence in his leadership. David Williams, Bishop of Basingstoke also "stepped back" and Sellin served as acting diocesan bishop. Dakin's and Williams' leave, and therefore Sellin's time as acting bishop, was later extended to the end of August 2021.

== List of bishops ==
Bishops of Southampton
From	Until	Incumbent	Notes
1895	1896	William Awdry	Translated to Osaka and South Tokyo
1896	1899	George Fisher	Translated to Ipswich
1898	1903	Arthur Lyttelton	
1903	1920	James Macarthur	Formerly Bishop of Bombay; also Archdeacon of the Isle of Wight. Resigned in ill health, remaining as Archdeacon and assistant bishop for the Island.
1921	1933	Cecil Boutflower	Formerly Bishop of Dorking and South Tokyo
1933	1943	Arthur Karney	Formerly Bishop of Johannesberg
1943	1951	Edmund Morgan	Translated to Truro
1951	1972	Kenneth Lamplugh	
1972	1984	John Cavell	
1984	1989	David Cartwright	
1989	1996	John Perry	Translated to Chelmsford
1996	2003	Jonathan Gledhill	Translated to Lichfield
2004	2009	Paul Butler	Translated to Southwell and Nottingham.
2010	2019	Jonathan Frost	Formerly Co-ordinating Chaplain to the University of Surrey; became Dean of York, 2 February 2019, translated to Portsmouth 22 March 2022
2019	2023	Debbie Sellin	Consecrated 3 July 2019; acting Bishop of Winchester, 20 May 2021–2023; translated to Peterborough, 13 December 2023.
2023	2024	Geoff Annas, acting bishop	Retired area Bishop of Stafford; acting bishop suffragan November 2023–2024
2024	present	Rhiannon King	Consecrated 18 October 2024.
