= Germon =

Germon is a surname. Notable people with the surname include:

- Effie Germon (1845–1914), American actress
- Lee Germon (born 1968), New Zealand cricketer
- Nane Germon (1909–2001), French actress

== See also ==
- Germond
