= Ambrose Reeves =

South African Anglican bishop

The Right Reverend Ambrose Reeves
- Bishop of Johannesburg
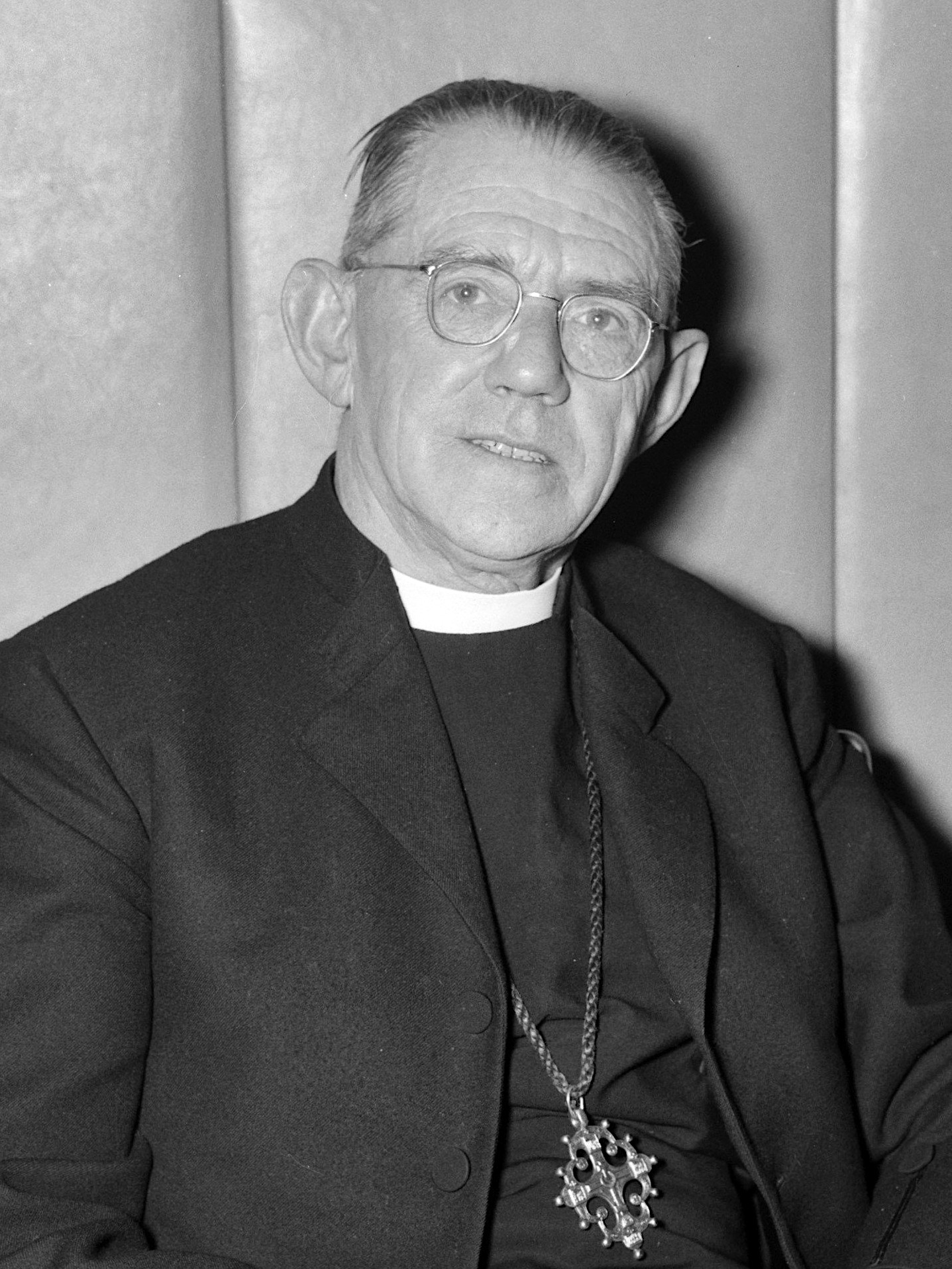
- Reeves in 1961
- Church: Church of the Province of Southern Africa
- Diocese: Johannesburg
- In office: 1949 to 1961

Orders
- Ordination: 1926 (deacon); 1927 (priest) by Arthur Winnington-Ingram
- Consecration: 12 June 1949 by Geoffrey Clayton

Personal details
- Born: Richard Ambrose Reeves; 6 December 1899
- Died: 23 December 1980 (aged 81)
- Education: Great Yarmouth High School
- Alma mater: Sidney Sussex College, Cambridge

Richard Ambrose Reeves (6 December 1899 – 23 December 1980) was an Anglican bishop and opponent of Apartheid in the 20th century.

== Education and ordinations ==
Reeves was educated at Great Yarmouth Grammar School, served in the Great War and Sidney Sussex College, Cambridge — he read history and moral science, graduated Bachelor of Arts (BA) in 1924 and proceeded Master of Arts (Cambridge) (MA Cantab) in 1943. He then trained for the ministry at the College of the Resurrection, Mirfield and the General Theological Seminary, New York and was ordained into the Church of England: deaconed on Trinity Sunday 1926 (30 May) and priested the next Trinity Sunday (12 June 1927) — both times by Arthur Winnington-Ingram, Bishop of London, at St Paul's Cathedral. In 1931, he married Ada van Ryssan; they had four children.

== Priestly ministry ==
Reeves' title post (curacy) was at St Albans, Golders Green (1926–1931), during which time he was also secretary of the theological department of the Christian Social Movement. His first incumbency followed, in Scotland: he was Rector of St Margaret's, Leven, where he remained until 1935.

He next served as secretary of the World Student Christian Federation — the worldwide federation of national Student Christian Movements (SCMs) — based in Geneva; and was licensed by the Bishops of Gibraltar and of Fulham to function as a priest within continental Europe. Returning to England in 1937, he became vicar of St James Haydock (between Liverpool and Manchester) until 1942, when he was appointed rector of Liverpool itself (the Church of Our Lady and St Nicholas). While at Liverpool, he additionally served as a canon of Liverpool Cathedral from 1942, and a proctor in convocation for the diocese, from 1945.

== Bishop in South Africa ==
On Trinity Sunday 1949 (12 June), Reeves was ordained to the episcopate by Geoffrey Clayton, Archbishop of Cape Town, at St George's Cathedral, Cape Town. He served as the third Bishop of Johannesburg (succeeding Clayton) from his consecration until 1961 – his position became untenable when the government of South Africa deported him on 12 September 1960 and he resigned the see effective 31 March 1961. Both during and after his tenure as bishop, Reeves was remarkably outspoken against the South African government's policies of apartheid – he published on the subject in the 1960s (Shooting at Sharpeville: the Agony of South Africa, 1960; South Africa-Yesterday and Tomorrow, 1962; Let the facts speak (Christian Action), 1962; Calvary Now, 1965) and served as president of the Anti-Apartheid Movement from 1970 until his death.

== Back in Britain ==
Once he had accepted he could not return to Johannesburg (and resigned his see), Reeves hoped for a see in England but an appointment never materialised. He served as general secretary of the Student Christian Movement (SCM), 1962–1965, and was also an Assistant Bishop of London until 1966. He then moved in 1966 to Lewes, East Sussex, to serve St Michael's parish as priest-in-charge until 1968, then as rector until his retirement in 1972; he was additionally licensed as Assistant Bishop of Chichester from 1966 until his death (functioning in retirement in Shoreham-by-Sea as what is now called an honorary assistant bishop).

Church of England titles
| Preceded by Geoffrey Clayton | Bishop of Johannesburg; 1949–1961 | Succeeded by Leslie Stradling |
