= Kenneth Lamplugh =

The Rt Rev Kenneth Edward Norman Lamplugh (9 November 1901 – 2 October 1979) was the eighth Suffragan Bishop of Southampton.

He was educated at King's College, Cambridge. Ordained in 1926 he began his career with curacies at Lambeth and Pietermaritzburg. He was then Vicar of St Mary's, Durban and after that Hartley Wintney. From 1942 he was Rural Dean of Lyndhurst and then (his final appointment before elevation to the Episcopate) Archdeacon of Lincoln. He died on 2 October 1979.

== Notes ==
Church of England titles
Preceded by Edmund Robert Morgan	Bishop of Southampton; 1951 –1972	Succeeded by John Kingsmill Cavell
