= Duncan Buchanan =

The Right Reverend Duncan Buchanan
- Bishop of Johannesburg
- Church: Anglican
- Province: Southern Africa
- Diocese: Johannesburg

Personal details
- Born: George Duncan Buchanan

George Duncan Buchanan (c. 1935 – 2012) was a South African Anglican bishop.

Duncan Buchanan grew up in Johannesburg, and became a priest in the Anglican Diocese of Natal. He was rector of the parish of Warner Beach in the early 1960s, and at the beginning of 1966 moved to Grahamstown to teach at St Paul's Theological College.

Buchanan succeeded John Suggit as warden of St Paul’s Theological College, Grahamstown, where he taught pastoral counseling.

He was Dean of Johannesburg and later bishop of Johannesburg.

During his episcopal ministry he chaired and made a significant contribution to the 1998 Lambeth Conference's committee on human sexuality.

Like most Anglican bishops in South Africa during the apartheid years he was drawn into anti-apartheid activism.

== Publications ==
- The Counselling of Jesus. Hodder and Stoughton. 1985. ISBN 978-0-340-36867-1.
- Closer to God Reading the Bible in the Power of the Holy Spirit. Struik Publishers. 2002. ISBN 978-1-86823-490-5.
