= Arthur Karney =

The Right Reverend Arthur Karney
- Bishop of Johannesburg
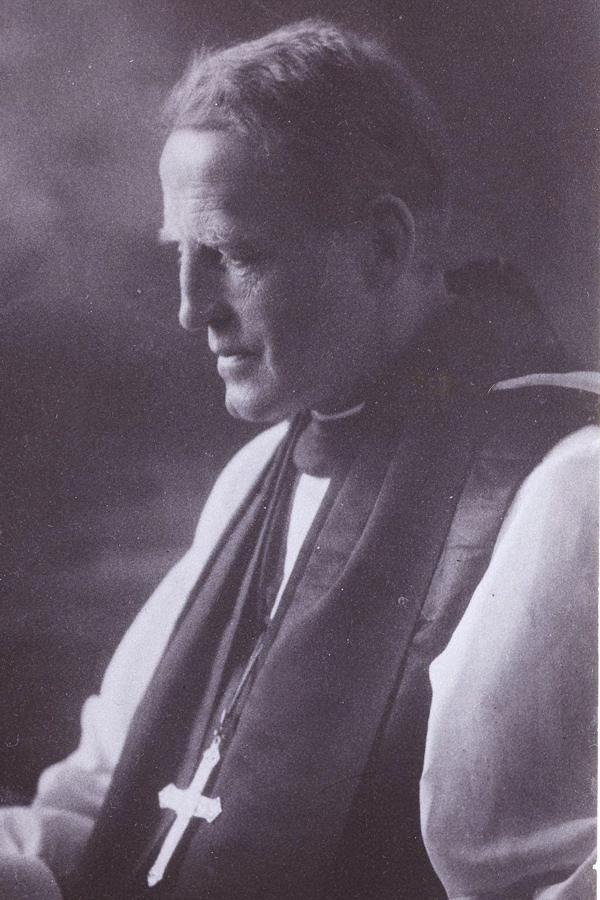
- Arthur Karney
- Church: Anglican
- Province: Southern Africa
- Diocese: Johannesburg

Personal details
- Born: 14 September 1874
- Died: 8 December 1963 (aged 89)

Arthur Baillie Lumsdaine Karney (1874 – 8 December 1963) was the first bishop of Johannesburg in the Anglican Church of Southern Africa and the Church of England.

== Family ==
Karney was one of 10 children of Gilbert Sparshott Karney, rector of Emmanuel Church, West Hampstead and Emma Sarah Storrs. He was educated at Windlesham House School, Brighton (1885–88), Haileybury and Trinity College, Cambridge, where he graduated BA in 1896.

He married Georgina Maude Bessie Fielding in Buenos Aires in 1908 and they had seven children, Peter, Anthony (Tony), Audrey. George, Rosamund, Mary (Molly) and Grace.

One of his older sisters, Evelyn, (1869–1953) founded the Talawa mission in Ceylon.

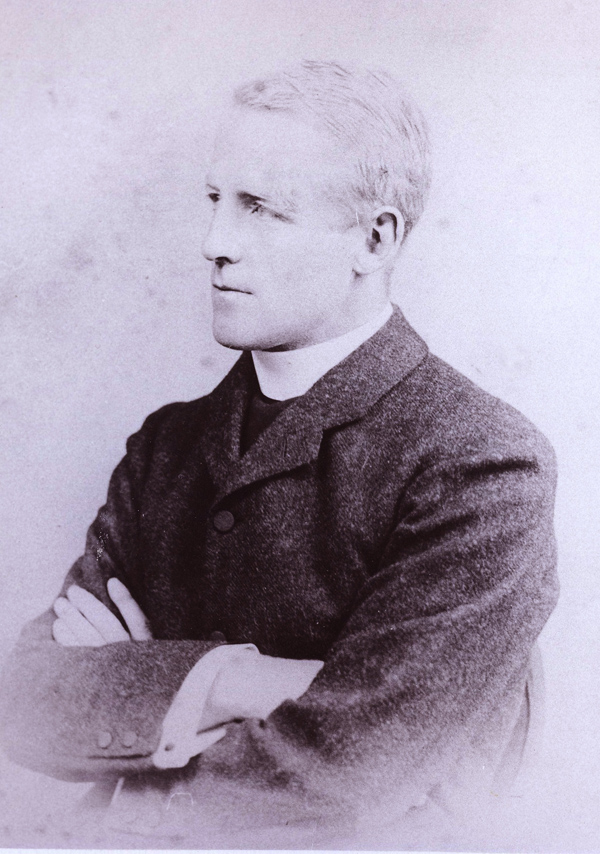
Arthur Karney

He was ordained in the Church of England in 1897 and appointed assistant chaplain to the Missions to Seamen at Sunderland. He had become fascinated in the work of seamen and in 1899 volunteered to work under Harry O'Rouke running the Seaman's Institute in San Francisco then one of the toughest assignments because of the number and state of the seamen arriving after the stormy voyage around Cape Horn. He became involved in protecting young seamen from being 'shanghaied' or 'crimped' and acquired the name of the fighting parson. The San Francisco Institute was destroyed by the earthquake in 1905. In 1903, he was rector of Woolpit in Suffolk. In 1906, he founded the Missions to Seamen in Buenos Aires.

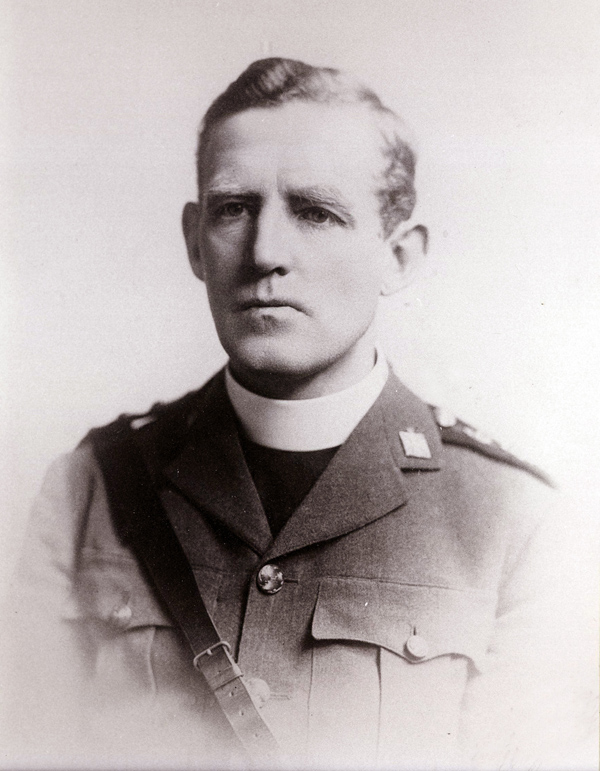
Arthur Karney, as military chaplain, 1918

In 1914, on the outbreak of the First World War he became a chaplain in the Royal Navy firstly on a hospital ship and then with pastoral care for 3rd Light Cruiser Squadron. He was in HMS Yarmouth at the Battle of Jutland, but being cypher officer, he was below and his main recollection of the battle was the incredible noise. In early 1918 he came chaplain with the 22nd Northumberland Fusiliers when they were overrun in the German March offensive and in the interests of protecting his men he was taken into captivity at the detention camp in Karlsruhe. From 1918 to 1922 he was Oxford Diocesan Missioner. In 1922 he was awarded an honorary DD by the University of Cambridge.

On 25 July 1922 he was consecrated first bishop of Johannesburg. St Mary's Cathedral, Johannesburg, which bears his name on the foundation stone, was built in a poor downtown area to serve ALL the people of the Johannesburg. He spent a considerable period of his ministry seeking better conditions for the "native" population. A card bearing the words "ALL RACES WELCOME – ARTHUR + " was pinned in the cathedral and remained there for some 50 years. He also instituted services for black congregations in their own languages. In Karney's first ten years not only was the fine cathedral consecrated but 25 churches had been built. During his first five years the number of black children in diocesan schools rose from just over 5,000 to more than 9,000. In 1931 Karney wrote "Alas the Native can't bargain – at least he can if he gets a great leader but he hasn't found one yet". In that month Desmond Tutu, later to succeed Karney as bishop of Johannesburg, was born and the young Nelson Mandela was tending cattle in the hills above Qunu in the Transkei.

He became bishop of Southampton from 1933 to 1943, chaplain of Marlborough College until 1944 and rector of Blendworth until 1949. Following his retirement he lived in Lewes, Sussex until his death in 1963.

Two of his sons became priests. Peter was chaplain of Trinity College, Cambridge, a naval chaplain during the war and vicar of Embleton, Northumberland. Tony was chaplain to the Church Railway Mission in South Africa and rector of Eythorne, Kent.

== Publications ==
- The Divine Gardener. 1936.
- Christ's Treasure House. Mowbray. 1939.
- Studies in the Character of Christ. A.R. Mowbray & Company Limited. 1937.
- God in the Bible. A.R. Mowbray. 1941.
- In Other Men's Shoes. 1935.

Anglican Church of Southern Africa titles
New diocese	Bishop of Johannesburg; 1922–1933	Succeeded by Geoffrey Clayton
