= Owen Nkumane =

South African rugby union footballer

- Born: Sibusiso Owen Nkumane; 10 August 1975 (age 51) Johannesburg, South Africa
- Height: 1.80 m (5 ft 11 in)
- Weight: 105 kg (231 lb)
- School: St John's College, Johannesburg

Rugby union career
- Position: Hooker
Provincial / State sides
| Years | Team | Apps | (Points) |
| 1998–1999 | Golden Lions | 30 | |
| 2000 | Border Bulldogs | 1 | |
Super Rugby
| Years | Team | Apps | (Points) |
| 1998 | Cats | 2 | |
International career
| Years | Team | Apps | (Points) |
| 1998 | South Africa | | |

Sibusiso Owen Nkumane (born 10 August 1975) is a South African former rugby union player and television commentator.

== Career ==
Nkumane played for the Transvaal under–20 team in 1996 and made his senior provincial debut for Golden Lions in 1998 and also played for the Cats in the Super Rugby tournament.

Nkumane toured with Springboks to Britain and Ireland in 1998. He did not play in any of the test matches but did play in four tour matches.

== See also ==
- List of South Africa national rugby union players – Springbok no. 679
