= Stephen Moreo =

Stephen Mosimanegape Moreo was the Bishop of Johannesburg from 16 March 2013 until 29 June 2025.

Moreo is from North West Province and studied for the priesthood at St Paul's Anglican seminary, Grahamstown. He was ordained deacon in 1984 and priest in 1985. His first post was at Ikageng. After that, he held incumbencies in Soweto.

== Notes ==
Anglican Church of Southern Africa titles
Preceded by Brian Germond	Bishop of Johannesburg; 2013 - 2025	Succeeded by Sepadi Moruthane
