= Oswald Reid =

South African army major

Oswald Reid VC
- Born: 2 November 1893; Johannesburg, South African Republic
- Died: 27 October 1920 (aged 26); Johannesburg
- Burial place: Braamfontein Cemetery, Johannesburg, South Africa; 26°11′6.46″S 28°1′6.45″E
- Military career
- Allegiance: United Kingdom; Union of South Africa
- Branch: British Army
- Service years: 1914 – 1920
- Rank: Major
- Units: 1st Battalion, The King's (Liverpool) Regiment
- Wars: World War I Russian Civil War
- Awards: Victoria Cross; Silver Medal for Military Valor (Italy)

Oswald Austin Reid VC (2 November 1893 – 27 October 1920) was a South African recipient of the Victoria Cross, the highest and most prestigious award for gallantry in the face of the enemy that can be awarded to British and Commonwealth forces.

== Early life ==
Reid was born at Johannesburg, the son of Harry Austin Reid and his wife Alice Gertrude, pioneering founders of the city. He attended the Diocesan College in Cape Town and St John's College in Johannesburg before moving on to Radley College in England in April 1910. The Headmaster sent a glowing reference praising his fine athleticism and role as senior prefect. Aged 16, he entered the Cricket XI as wicket-keeper in his first term. The next year he was in the Football XI and played as forward in the Rugby XV. . Reid was a Heavyweight boxing champion in the college and a member of the Debating Society. Then he became a full back in the football XI and was elected to the Literary Society in November 1911.

Joining the College OTC he gained an A Certificate in March 1912. In freezing conditions he played in the Rugby 1st XV in January 1912, injured himself in a skating accident. He recovered, switched to the wing in Rugby and proved fast. He proved a great hurdler, and then returned as 1st XI wicket-keeper. But working on bowling and batting, his averages improved in all aspects of the game.

Reid became Senior Prefect in Michaelmas 1912, began writing poetry and, dominated the school's sports. He was there for three years became Senior Prefect and Captain of the Football and Cricket teams. He was also captain of Swimming and elected President of the Debating Society, and Colour Sergeant of the OTC. He picked up another Football injury in 1913, and had to be excluded for the second year running. Without Reid, with two weak knees, Rugby XV was without pace in the backs. In summer 1913 he was an excellent Cricket XI captain scoring 101 with the bat against Bradfield in one match. He represented the Public Schools XI at Lord's. He continued playing cricket after school and in the army.

That summer he left for Holland to learn Dutch with a view to working in the Transvaal, when the war broke out. He continued a lifelong correspondence with his old headmaster in Johannesburg: in one of his letter hinting he would enter Holy Orders. On 14 August 1914 he was commissioned into 4th battalion King's Liverpool Regiment.

== Military career ==
In 1915 he took part in the Battle of Neuve Chapelle. He fought alongside soldiers from India. The casualty rate of officers was very high, attrition rates of over 100. Two of his friends were killed. The shelling was terrific, and the Germans had very accurate snipers. Reid was wounded in the head at the Second Battle of Ypres in April 1915. In his copious correspondence to his Headmaster in St John's College, Johannesburg he explained his motives and experiences. Of the regiment's complement of 30 officers and 1000 men, only 7 officers and 300 men remained after only two months in the theatre of operations. At Ypres they were gassed; and he praised the men who "carry an enormous weight on their packs...their marvellous imperturbability and cheerfulness...They face death as if it was a common occurrence." He took strength from their courage. Having been sent home wounded, he returned to France in September 1915. He was a lieutenant with the 1st battalion, having been promoted to that rank in March, until promoted to captain in December in "one of the finest and oldest of the British Regiments." The British now had trench mortars. But he was wrong to think the war would be won by summer 1916. He had already been wounded a second time at 1st Battle of Arras in April 1915, spending all the months to July 1916 in England. He did not serve in the Somme, but was sent to India on the North-West Frontier with 2nd battalion. In December he arrived in Mesopotamia, promoted to captain and transferred into the Loyal North Lancashire Regiment, attached to the 6th Battalion. He was perhaps naive in his assessment of the Turk as "much more of a sportsman than the Germans..."

== For Valour ==
On 7 March 1917 at the Battle of Diyalah River, Mesopotamia, the men of the King's Own Lancaster Regiment tried to cross the river, but even before the first platoon had crossed were under Turkish cross-fire. The Royal Engineers building the pontoon were killed from 50 yards away across the river by machine-guns and artillery. A second pontoon was attacked by mustard gas killing or wounding all the engineers. In all five attempts were made to cross the river but the positions were dominated by enfilade fire. Dead and wounded bodies were seen floating down the river.

The next night a surprise assault was made, but other pontoons behind were held up as Turkish sentries awoke to the noise. As a result, 100 Lancashire soldiers were left stranded on the north bank of the river, cut off without reinforcements. A much stronger Turkish force attacked all day and all night. With great skill they managed to throw back the grenades thrown into their positions by the Turks. Sometimes at the point of a bayonet they fought back the Turks, time and time again constantly for 30 hours. The one piece of good fortune was the redoubt thrown up by the bend in the river, that offered some shelter. Finally on the morning of 10 March, a rescue was effected. They found 30 exhausted survivors; bodies piled up around the defensive parapets.

Reid's bravery in defending the position, and isolated bridgehead was vital, and crucial, allowing enough time for reinforcements to cross the river. The manoeuvre allowed General Sir Stanley Maude to outflank the Turks and to effect entry into Baghdad on 11 March 1917. Captain Reid was granted leave that summer 1917 returned to Johannesburg. The town's first winner of the Victoria Cross was given a rapturous welcome, reported a local newspaper. "Thank you all very much. It's all a matter of luck", said Reid in all due modesty - soldierly and professional to the last. Reid left South Africa to return to the regiment on Monday 13 August 1917. He had already been made Acting Major on 10 May. On 31 August 1917 it was announced that the Italian government had awarded him the silver medal for Military Valour. In October 1917 he suffered a recurrence of the Rugby injury to a cartilage in the knee, and was invalided out. In December the General's Report mentioned him in despatches. He returned home to recover from his injuries.

=== Medal citation ===
Captain Oswald Austin Reid King's Liverpool Regiment attached Loyal North Lancashire Regiment

For most conspicuous bravery in the face of desperate circumstances.

By his dauntless courage and leadership he was able to consolidate a small post with the advanced troops, on the opposite side of a river to the main body, after the lines of communication had been cut by the sinking of pontoons.

He maintained his position for 30 hours against constant attacks by bombs machine guns and shell fire, with the full knowledge that repeated attempts at relief had failed, and that his ammunition was all but exhausted. It was greatly due to his tenacity that the passage of the river was effected on the following night.

During the operations he was wounded

His Victoria Cross is displayed at the National Museum of Military History in Johannesburg.

== Later life ==
On the fourth anniversary of the start of the war, 4 August 1918, at a commemoration in Johannesburg, Reid received a ceremonial sword on his son's behalf, who was still serving in Mesopotamia. On All Saints Day 1919, Oswald Reid attended a reunion at Radley where he was very welcome indeed. The boys were granted a half-holiday at Reid's request. The editor of the Radleian of the day recorded the event. A great reception was held with a dinner and speeches. He met Reid personally, and little had changed despite his military hardships. He had fallen in love with a sister of an old school chum, but she had married another man. He was feeling quite depressed about it. But Reid was a tall good looking robust, strong young man, well-liked and popular. He had a ready smile and good humour, never complained about his wounds and bore his infirmities manfully. He hid his VC in a tree trunk ashamed by his embarrassment. When he left Radley Reid returned to his base. On 6 February 1920 he was demobilized and travelled home to South Africa. On 1 April, he resigned his army commission, taking up a new commission in the Transvaal Scottish Regiment with the rank of captain. He was he first secretary of the Comrades of the Great War League (later the British Empire Service League and now called the South African Legion) he entered the political sphere winning a seat at Troyeville in March 1920.

On Monday 25 October he fell ill going to the office, but insisted on working. Two days later he died from gastro enteritis due to complication from the wounds he received during the war. His funeral took place on Sunday 31 October 1920, at St Mary's Cathedral, Johannesburg. Crowds thronged the streets to see off their hero. The procession cortege passed along the street to the cemetery. Acting-Major Reid is buried in Braamfontein Cemetery in Johannesburg.

== Bibliography ==
- Wyrall, Everard (September 2002). History of the King's Regiment (Liverpool) 1914-1919. Vol. 1–3. Naval & Military Press Ltd. ISBN 184342360X.
- Lawson, K.C. Venture of Faith: The story of St John's College, Johnannesburg 1898-1968.
- Monick, S.; Heming, D.R.A. A selection of British Military Swords of the 18th, 19th and 20th Centuries.
- Monick, S., St John's College and the War: The Letters of Oswald Reid
- "Radleian Magazine 1910-1920".
- The Star (Johannesburg)
- Official History of the Great War: The Campaign in Mesopotamia 1914-1918
- Townshend, Charles (2010). When God Made Hell: The Campaign in Mesopotamia 1914-1922. London.
- Crutchley, C.E. (28 November 2013). Machine Gunners: Personal Experiences of the Machine Gun Corps. Pen & Sword Military. ISBN 978-1783461783.
- Gliddon, Gerald (2005). The Sideshows. VCs of the First World War. Stroud, Gloucestershire: Sutton Publishing. ISBN 978-0-7509-2084-1.
