= Xolani Dlwati =

Xolani Dlwati was Dean of Johannesburg from December 2015 until 27 November 2022.

He was born in Soweto and educated at the University of South Africa. He was Rector of St Monnica's Church, Midrand then Archdeacon of Randfontein. He has served as the 18th Dean of the diocese of Johannesburg, South Africa
