= Geoffrey Clayton (bishop) =

Geoffrey Hare Clayton was an Anglican archbishop in the 20th century.

He was born on 12 December 1884, educated at Rugby and Pembroke College, Cambridge, and ordained, after a period of study at Ripon College Cuddesdon, in 1909. A Fellow of Peterhouse, Cambridge, he was its Dean from 1910 to 1914 when he became a Chaplain to the BEF. When peace returned he was vicar of Little St Mary's, Cambridge and after that (successively) vicar, rural dean and finally archdeacon of Chesterfield. In 1934 he became bishop of Johannesburg and served for 14 years before his appointment as archbishop of Cape Town. A sub-prelate of the Order of St John of Jerusalem, he died on 7 March 1957.

== Apartheid and the Archbishop ==
On Ash Wednesday 1957, the day before he died, Clayton signed, on behalf of the bishops of the Church of the Province of South Africa, a letter to the prime minister of South Africa, J. G. Strijdom refusing to obey and refusing to counsel the people of the Anglican Church in South Africa to obey, the provisions of section 29(c) of the Native Laws Amendment Act. The act sought to enforce apartheid in all Christian congregations.

We should ourselves be unable to obey this Law or to counsel our clergy and people to do so. We therefore appeal to you, Sir, not to put us in a position in which we have to choose between obeying our conscience and obeying the law of the land.

—

== Notes ==
Anglican Church of Southern Africa titles
| Preceded by Arthur Baillie Lumsdaine Karney | Bishop of Johannesburg; 1934 – 1948 | Succeeded by Richard Ambrose Reeves |
| Preceded by John Russell Darbyshire | Anglican Archbishop of Cape Town; 1948 – 1957 | Succeeded by Joost de Blank |
