= Anglican Diocese of Johannesburg =

Diocese of the Anglican Church of Southern Africa

Diocese of Johannesburg Dioecesis Ioannesburgensis

Location
- Country: South Africa
- Ecclesiastical province: Southern Africa
- Metropolitan: Thabo Makgoba
- Headquarters: St Joseph's Diocesan Centre in Sophiatown, Johannesburg

Statistics
- Parishes: 76

Information
- Denomination: Anglican
- Rite: Anglican
- Cathedral: St Mary's Cathedral, Johannesburg
- Patron saint: The Blessed Virgin Mary

Current leadership
- Bishop: Sepadi Moruthane

Website
- Official Website

The Diocese of Johannesburg is a non-metropolitan diocese of the Anglican Church of Southern Africa. It was formed in 1922 from the southern part of the Diocese of Pretoria, and at that time included the whole of the southern Transvaal. Today it is much smaller, and comprises the central part of Gauteng province. The cathedral of the Diocese of Johannesburg is the Cathedral Church of Saint Mary the Virgin. The headquarters of the diocese and the bishop's office are situated at St Joseph's Diocesan Centre in Sophiatown, Johannesburg. The diocese oversees St John's College, Johannesburg, St Mary's School, Waverley, Bishop Bavin School (former), St Peter's College, Johannesburg and Vuleka Schools. The diocese has a total of 76 parishes

== List of the Bishops of Johannesburg ==
- Arthur Karney 1922-1933
- Geoffrey Clayton 1934-1949
- Ambrose Reeves 1949-1961
  - Edward Paget (former archbishop of Central Africa) served as vicar-general following Reeves' deportation in September 1960
- Leslie Stradling 1961-1974
- Timothy Bavin 1974-1985
- Desmond Tutu 1985-1986
- George Buchanan 1986-2000
  - Sigisbert Ndwandwe was a suffragan bishop of the diocese in 1988
  - Godfrey Ashby, Assistant Bishop of Leicester (England) was also an assistant bishop of the diocese in 1988
- Brian Germond 2000-2013
- Stephen Moreo elected on 4 Sept 2012, consecrated 16 March 2013 and Retired on 29 June 2025 After a Thanksgiving liturgy at the Cathedral of Saint Mary the Virgin.
- Sepadi Moruthane elected on 3 Oct 2025 at St John's College (Johannesburg) and consecrated 22 February 2026

== Coat of arms ==
Arm of the Diocese of Johannesburg

The diocese assumed a coat of arms in 1922. The arms were formally granted by the College of Arms in 1949, and registered at the Bureau of Heraldry in 1964 : Gules, in front of two wings conjoined in lure Or, a heart Gules transfixed by a sword, point downwards proper, pommel and hilt Or, a chief barry wavy of six Azure and Argent, the shield ensigned with an episcopal mitre.

== Sources ==
- Lee, Peter (2005). Compromise and courage: Anglicans in Johannesburg 1864-1999. Pietermaritzburg: Cluster. ISBN 1-875053-50-6.
