= Pete Broadbent =

English Anglican bishop (born 1952)

The Right Reverend Pete Broadbent
- Bishop of Willesden
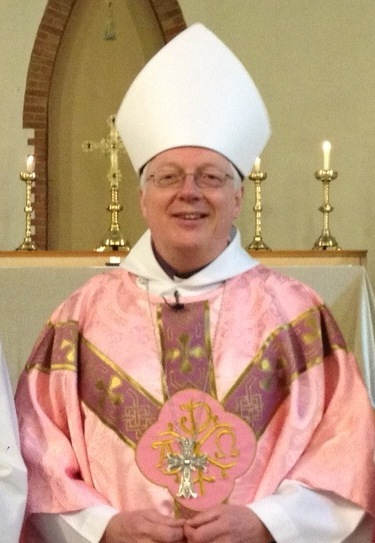
- Broadbent in 2012
- Church: Church of England
- Diocese: London
- In office: 2001 – 2021
- Predecessor: Graham Dow
- Successor: Lusa Nsenga-Ngoy
- Other posts: Archdeacon of Northolt (1995–2001); Acting area Bishop of Stepney (2010–2011 & 2018–2019); Acting area Bishop of Edmonton (2014–2015); Acting Bishop of London (2017–2018)

Orders
- Ordination: 1977 (deacon); 1978 (priest) by John Habgood
- Consecration: 25 January 2001

Personal details
- Born: 31 July 1952 (age 74)
- Denomination: Anglican
- Parents: Philip and Patricia
- Spouse: Sarah Broadbent (m. 1974)
- Education: Jesus College, Cambridge; St John's College, Nottingham

Peter Alan Broadbent (born 31 July 1952), known as Pete Broadbent, is an English Anglican bishop. He served as the Bishop of Willesden, an area bishop in the Church of England Diocese of London for twenty years, 2001–2021. During the vacancy in the diocesan see from 2017 to 2018, he served as Acting Bishop of London.

== Early life and education ==
Broadbent was born on 31 July 1952. He was educated at Merchant Taylors' School, Northwood, Middlesex. He was 15 years of age when he became a committed Christian through the Crusaders youth organisation. He studied English at Jesus College, Cambridge, and then studied theology at St John's College, Nottingham, before being ordained.

== Ordained ministry ==
He was ordained a deacon at Michaelmas (25 September) 1977 and a priest the next Michaelmas (24 September 1978), both times by John Habgood, Bishop of Durham, at Durham Cathedral. Broadbent's first curacy was at St Nicholas' Church, Durham when George Carey, who later became the Archbishop of Canterbury, was its vicar. Broadbent moved to the Diocese of London in 1980 to be curate of Emmanuel Church, Holloway and the Chaplain for Mission to Jim Thompson, Bishop of Stepney.

In 1983 he was appointed chaplain to the Polytechnic of North London, also serving as curate of St Mary's Islington. In 1989 he moved to the Willesden area, becoming Vicar of Trinity St Michael, Harrow and also became the Area Dean of Harrow in 1994 and the Archdeacon of Northolt in 1995.

Broadbent has served on the General Synod of the Church of England for over 15 years and was a member of its standing committee. From 1999 to 2000 he chaired the business committee of the synod and played a role in the foundation of the Archbishops' Council. He is active in Spring Harvest, Europe's largest annual Christian conference.

=== Episcopal ministry ===
He was consecrated a bishop on 25 January 2001, having legally taken the See of Willesden in a ceremony immediately beforehand. Broadbent was one of three serving bishops in the Church of England to refuse to attend the 2008 Lambeth Conference, a gathering of all Anglican bishops convened by the Archbishop of Canterbury every 10 years, as part of a protest against the ordination of gay clergy.

Broadbent chaired the Diocesan Board for Schools for London from 1996 to 2006 and from 1999 to 2003 was on the governing body of the City Parochial Foundation. He is a member of the Labour Party and was a councillor for the London Borough of Islington from 1982 and 1990, being the chair of their Development and Planning Committee.

In the period between Stephen Oliver and Adrian Newman as Bishop of Stepney, Broadbent temporarily and additionally had episcopal oversight over that area from 7 July 2010 until 22 July 2011. He was later acting area Bishop of Edmonton between the retirement of Peter Wheatley on 31 December 2014 and the consecration of Rob Wickham on 23 September 2015. He additionally served as acting diocesan Bishop of London between the retirement of Richard Chartres and the consecration of Sarah Mullally. During his tenure he controversially described the Anglican high church tradition as "faffy ceremonial" that lacked the "deep faith" of the Anglo-Catholic tradition. With Newman's resignation due to ill health, Broadbent became Acting Bishop of Stepney again, from 31 October 2018 until a new bishop was appointed in 2019.

He is a trustee of the Church of England Newspaper

It was announced on 16 March 2021 that Broadbent would resign his see effective 30 September 2021 and take on a new role relating to the Diocesan 2030 Vision. On 1 October 2021, Broadbent received the Bishop of London's permission to officiate and licence as an honorary assistant bishop of the diocese; and became the Bishop's Adviser (2030 Vision).

In July 2024, he was commissioned by the Church of England Evangelical Council as an "overseer" to provided alternative spiritual oversight (not to be confused with the Church of England's official alternative episcopal oversight) to evangelical clergy and parishes in the Church of England who maintain traditional teaching on the doctrine of marriage and sexual ethics, following the General Synod's support for the introduction of a service of blessing for same sex couples.

== Personal life ==
Broadbent is married to Sarah and they have an adult son.

== Republican controversy ==
On the announcement of the engagement of Prince William of Wales to Catherine Middleton, Broadbent declared on Facebook that he is a republican, said that the couple were "shallow celebrities" who would be "set up to fail by the gutter press", and predicted that their marriage would last less than seven years. He also called the royal family "philanderers" and said that the basis of the monarchy is "corrupt and sexist", while disparagingly referring to William's parents, Charles, Prince of Wales, and Diana, Princess of Wales, as "Big Ears" and the "Porcelain Doll". His views were reported in various Sunday newspapers and were widely condemned. Conservative MP Nicholas Soames, a close friend of the Prince of Wales, described Broadbent's comments as "extremely rude" and "not what one expects from a bishop".

Broadbent subsequently issued an apology for his remarks and agreed to "withdraw from public ministry until further notice" on 23 November 2010. Richard Chartres, Bishop of London (and a close friend of the Prince of Wales), said that he was "appalled" by Broadbent's comments and expressed his "dismay on behalf of the Church". It was announced on 10 January 2011 that Broadbent was to return to duty that day, both as Bishop of Willesden and acting Bishop of Stepney. He remained as acting Bishop of Stepney until 22 July 2011 (when the new bishop, Adrian Newman was consecrated).

== Styles ==
- The Reverend Pete Broadbent (1977–1995)
- The Venerable Pete Broadbent (1995–2001)
- The Right Reverend Pete Broadbent (2001–present)

Church of England titles
| Preceded by Graham Dow | Bishop of Willesden; 2001–2021 | Succeeded by Lusa Nsenga-Ngoy |
