= Sean Doherty (ethicist) =

British Anglican priest and academic

The Reverend Sean Doherty
- Born: 1980 (age 45–46)

Academic background
- Education: University of Oxford; Wycliffe Hall, Oxford
- Thesis: Moral theological method in the theological ethics of Martin Luther and Arthur Rich, with particular reference to their economic ethics (2011)

Academic work
- Discipline: Christian ethics
- Sub-discipline: Economic ethics; sexual ethics; charismatic theology
- Institutions: St Paul's Theological Centre; St Mellitus College; Trinity College, Bristol

Sean William Doherty (born 1980) is a British Anglican priest and academic specialising in Christian ethics. Since June 2019, he has been Principal of Trinity College, Bristol, an evangelical Anglican theological college.

== Biography ==
Doherty studied English literature, theology and ethics at the University of Oxford (BA, MPhil, DPhil), and trained for ordained ministry at Wycliffe Hall, Oxford. He began by study English literature for his undergraduate degree, before switching to theology after one year. His doctoral thesis was titled "Moral theological method in the theological ethics of Martin Luther and Arthur Rich, with particular reference to their economic ethics", and was completed in 2011. His doctoral supervisor was Bernd Wannenwetsch.

Doherty was ordained in the Church of England as a deacon in 2007 and as a priest in 2008. He served his curacy at St Gabriel's Church, Cricklewood in the Diocese of London from 2007 to 2010. He was additionally a lecturer at St Paul's Theological Centre, Holy Trinity Brompton, between 2008 and 2010. In 2010, he joined St Mellitus College, a Church of England theological college in London, as a tutor and lecturer in Christian ethics. He additionally served the college as Director of Studies from 2014, for his final four years with them. He was an elected member of the General Synod of the Church of England from 2015 to 2019.

In February 2019, it was announced that he would be leaving St Mellitus College to become the next head of Trinity College, Bristol. He took up the appointment as principal, in succession to Emma Ineson, in June 2019. He has also held permission to officiate in the Diocese of Bristol since 2020. In June 2026, he was appointed "executive principal" of both Trinity College, Bristol and St Mellitus College; they remain autonomous, separate institutions, but share senior oversight by Doherty.

Doherty's research interests include economic ethics, sexual ethics, and medical ethics.

== Personal life ==
Doherty is married to Gaby, and together they have four children. He is same-sex attracted but does not identify as gay. He was a founder of Living Out, a website aimed at people who are "same-sex attracted while remaining committed to a traditional view of Christian sexuality".

== Selected works ==
- Doherty, Sean (2014). Theology and economic ethics: Martin Luther and Arthur Rich in dialogue. Oxford: Oxford University Press. ISBN 978-0198703334.
- Doherty, Sean (2015). The Only Way is Ethics: Part 1, Sex and marriage. Milton Keynes: Authentic Media. ISBN 978-1780781440.
- Kidwell, Jeremy; Doherty, Sean, eds. (2015). Theology and economics: a Christian vision of the common good. New York: Palgrave Macmillan. ISBN 978-1137552235.
- Doherty, Sean (2016). The Only Way is Ethics: Part 2, Life and Death. Milton Keynes: Authentic Media. ISBN 978-1780781525.
