= Duncan Green (priest) =

British priest

The Venerable Duncan Green
- Archdeacon of Northolt
- Church: Church of England
- Diocese: Diocese of London
- In office: April 2013 – November 2019
- Predecessor: Rachel Treweek
- Successor: Catherine Pickford

Orders
- Ordination: 1984 (deacon); 1985 (priest)

Personal details
- Born: Duncan Jamie Green; 30 April 1952 (age 74)
- Denomination: Anglicanism
- Spouse: Janet (m. 1975)
- Children: Three
- Education: Salisbury and Wells Theological College

Duncan Jamie Green (born 30 April 1952) is a British retired Anglican priest. From 2013 until retirement, he was Archdeacon of Northolt in the Diocese of London; from 2007 to 2013, he was the Church of England's Olympic and Paralympic Co-ordinator.

== Early life and education ==
Green was born on 30 April 1952. His first career was as a sales director for an agricultural engineering company. In 1982, he matriculated into Salisbury and Wells Theological College, an Anglican theological college, to train for Holy Orders.

== Ordained ministry ==
Green was ordained in the Church of England as a deacon in 1984 and as a priest in 1985. From 1984 to 1987, he served his curacy at Holy Cross, Uckfield in the Diocese of Chichester. In 1987, he moved to the Diocese of Chelmsford as a Diocese Youth Officer. From 1993 to 1996, he was also Warden and Chaplain of St Mark's College Residential Youth Centre at Audley End House, which he had help establish. Remaining in the Diocese of Chelmsford, he took up his first incumbency. From 1996 to 2007, he was Team Rector of Saffron Walden (St Mary) with Wendens Ambo, Littlebury, Ashdon, and Hadstock. He was additionally Rural Dean of Saffron Walden between 2000 or 2005 and 2007.

In 2007, Green was appointed the Church of England's Olympic and Paralympic Co-ordinator: London was hosting the 2012 Summer Olympics and Paralympics. He was additionally assigned to the London Organising Committee of the Olympic and Paralympic Games (LOCOG) as a faith adviser. From early 2010, he was also head of LOCOG's multi-faith chaplaincy services. During the Olympics and Paralympics, "he oversaw the chaplaincy service for 20,000 athletes and officials, 200,000 staff and volunteers together with 26,000 reporters and broadcasters". In March 2016, he was awarded the Langton Award for Community Service by the Archbishop of Canterbury, Justin Welby, in recognition of "his contribution to the London 2012 Olympic and Paralympic Games".

In 2013, Green was appointed the next Archdeacon of Northolt in the Diocese of London. In April 2013, he was installed as archdeacon by Richard Chartres, the Bishop of London, during a service at St Paul's Cathedral. His archdeaconry corresponds with the Willesden Episcopal Area which comprises the deaneries of Brent, Ealing, Harrow and Hillingdon. Since 2016, he has also been honorary priest in charge of St Matthew's Church, Ealing Common.

It was announced on 13 June 2019 that Green was to retire "later" that year. He retired effective 30 November 2019.

== Personal life ==
In 1975, Green married Janet Mary Orpin. Together they had three children: Adam, Anna and Christine.
