= Bucklesham =

Village in Suffolk, England

Coordinates: 52.029682°N 1.26917°E

- St Mary's Church, Bucklesham

- Location within Suffolk
- Population: 526 (2011 census)
- District: East Suffolk
- Shire county: Suffolk
- Region: East
- Country: England
- Sovereign state: United Kingdom
- Post town: Ipswich
- Postcode district: IP10
- Dialling code: 01473

Bucklesham is a village and civil parish in the East Suffolk district of Suffolk, England, a few miles east of Ipswich.

== History ==
Bucklesham is derived from the old English meaning Buccel's homestead or village. The village is recorded in the Domesday Book with a population in 1086 of 36 households made up of 32 freeholders and 4 small holders.

The village gave its name to HMS Bucklesham, a Ham-class minesweeper. The bell off of HMS Bucklesham can be found inside the village primary school.

== Facilities ==
The village has a school, a church, a village hall (shared with the neighbouring Foxhall), houses and the pub is named The Shannon after Rear Admiral Philip Broke's ship HMS Shannon (1806). A small cottage – Shell Cottage – near St Mary's church was the old school, and the names of the children can still be found written on the walls. The newer school has 15 students per year group, and about 100 students in all. The village playing field is used by the children and the football team. The field has swings, an obstacle course and some basic gym equipment.

== Notable residents ==
- Basil Brown, archaeologist and astronomer who in 1939 discovered and excavated a 7th-century Anglo-Saxon ship burial at Sutton Hoo.
- Roy Southwell, Vicar and first Archdeacon of Northolt.
