= Trinity College, Bristol =

Evangelical Anglican theological college in Bristol, England

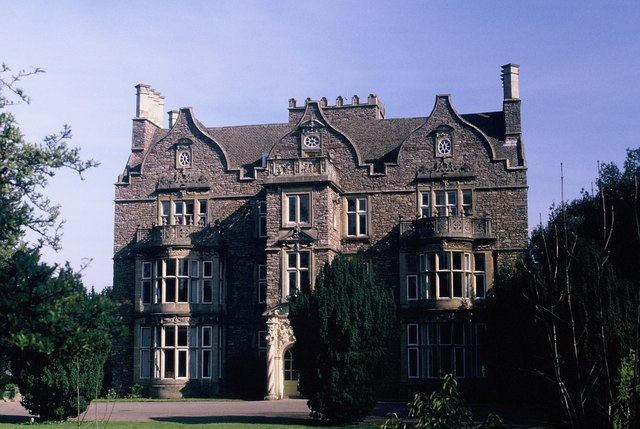
- Type: Theological college
- Established: 1971
- Religious affiliation: Church of England
- Academic affiliations: University of Durham; University of Aberdeen
- Principal: Sean Doherty
- Location: Bristol, England; 51.477781°N 2.631631°W
- Website: www.trinitycollegebristol.ac.uk

Trinity College, Bristol is an evangelical Anglican theological college located in Stoke Bishop, Bristol, England. It offers a range of full-time and part-time taught undergraduate and postgraduate courses which are validated by the University of Durham through the Common Awards Scheme, though the college sets its own curriculum. Many of its students are training for ordination in the Church of England; and hence there is a strong vocational aspect to the courses it provides. It also has students of other Christian denominations, as well as students who are intending to serve within various forms of lay ministry. The college also has a significant number of students studying for research degrees at masters and doctoral levels. All of Trinity's postgraduate research courses are validated by the University of Aberdeen.

It runs an evening programme for students from a number of Christian denominations, as well as those training for ordained and lay ministry in the Diocese of Bristol.

== History ==
Trinity College, Bristol was formed in 1971 from a merger of three evangelical colleges in Bristol: Clifton College, Dalton House with St Michaels, and Tyndale Hall. Trinity College, Bristol is rooted in the evangelical tradition (and is affiliated to the Evangelical Alliance) but offers training to Christians from a variety of theological traditions.

All of the colleges had their origins in the Bible Churchmen's Missionary Society (BCMS, now Crosslinks). The Bible Missionary Training College opened in Bristol in 1925, and was recognised by the Church of England in 1927. The BCMS college faced great difficulties in its early days. Its conservative evangelical constituency was numerically and financially weak. The staff split over the issue of subscription to BCMS' doctrinal basis, and those who did not view subscription as essential left to form Clifton Theological College. Subsequently, Dalton House was opened to train women. The Principal of the men's college (C.S.Carter) resigned in the early 1930s after dismissing a student. It was renamed Tyndale Hall in 1952.

An earlier attempt at merger in the 1960s was poorly handled and resulted in considerable conflict.

In the years following its opening, Trinity College developed an international reputation for its evangelical scholarship, particularly in the field of biblical studies. With the appointment of George Carey as principal in 1982, the college experienced significant growth in student numbers and became known for its openness to charismatic spirituality.

In September 1997, Trinity College Bristol formed the Bristol Federation with Bristol Baptist College, Wesley College, and the West of England Ministerial Training Course (WEMTC). Following the later closure of Wesley College and the move of WEMTC, Trinity College continues a close relationship with Bristol Baptist College as federated institutions, sharing common courses.

== Notable staff ==
The current faculty includes Helen Collins, Sean Doherty, Paul Roberts, David Firth, J.P. Davies, Taido Chino, and Howard Worsley. A number of prominent scholars are among its associate faculty, including Paula Gooder, John Nolland, Craig A. Evans, Michael Goheen, Nijay Gupta, Gordon McConville, Steve Walton and Craig Bartholomew.

=== List of principals ===
The head of Trinity College is the principal. The current principal is the Revd Dr Sean Doherty.

- J. Alec Motyer (1971–1981)
- Joyce Baldwin (1981–1982)
- George Carey (1982–1988); later the 103rd Archbishop of Canterbury
- David Keith Gillett (1988–1999); later Bishop of Bolton
- Francis Bridger (1999–2005); later Professor at Fuller Theological Seminary and Dean of Brechin
- George Iype Kovoor (2005–2013); Chaplain to the Queen later fellow of Berkeley College, Yale University, Rector of St Paul's Episcopal Church, Darien, CT.
- Emma Ineson (2014–2019); Chaplain to the Queen, Bishop of Kensington
- Sean Doherty (2019–present)

== Notable former staff and alumni ==
- Donald Allister – Former Bishop of Peterborough.
- Nick Baines – Former Bishop of Leeds.
- Jonathan Clark – Former Bishop of Croydon.
- Bob Evens – Former Bishop of Crediton.
- Jonathan Gledhill – Former Bishop of Lichfield.
- Anne Hollinghurst – Former Bishop of Aston.
- Karen Gorham – Bishop of Sherborne.
- David Jackman – Former president of the Proclamation Trust.
- Richard Jackson – Bishop of Hereford and Current Chair of Trinity College Council
- Alistair Magowan – former Bishop of Ludlow.
- Adrian Newman – Former Bishop of Stepney.
- J. I. Packer – Associate principal from 1971 to 1979.
- Mark Rylands – Former Bishop of Shrewsbury
- Jackie Searle – Former Bishop of Crediton
- Andrew Williams – Bishop of New England

== Stoke House ==
Stoke House, the building that forms the main front of Trinity College, has been designated by English Heritage as a grade II* listed building. It was built by Sir Robert Cann and probably completed in 1669. This date is above the front door in rather untrustworthy lettering (which may have been added much later). However, the date fits with the building's style and other documentary evidence. The doorway is certainly Jacobean in character, including excessively twisted columns of three wound strands, with naive Corinthian capitals containing a mask each. The spandrels above the door contain allegorical females either side of the Cann family crest. The sidewalls of the porch are typical of c.1670 with upright oval windows keyed into oblong panels, here under steep open pediments. The oak staircase within the building is characteristically mid-seventeenth century. The three ogee gables along the front roofline are also quite Jacobean in character, but the rest of house is much altered. The original cross windows (cf. J. Kip's 1712 engraving) were replaced with gothic versions c. 1750 as shown in John Turner's 1791 painting of the house. In 1872 Foster & Wood installed mullioned-and-transomed windows in double-height canted bays with projecting curved centres and strapwork cresting. They also reinstated the oval windows in the gables with reference to those in the porch. Two rooftop cupolas were removed in the twentieth century. At the rear of the building two three-storey blocks were added in the seventeenth century, one at an angle to the house.
