= Paul Williams (bishop) =

British bishop and Lord Spiritual (born 1968)

The Right Reverend Paul Williams
- Bishop of Southwell and Nottingham
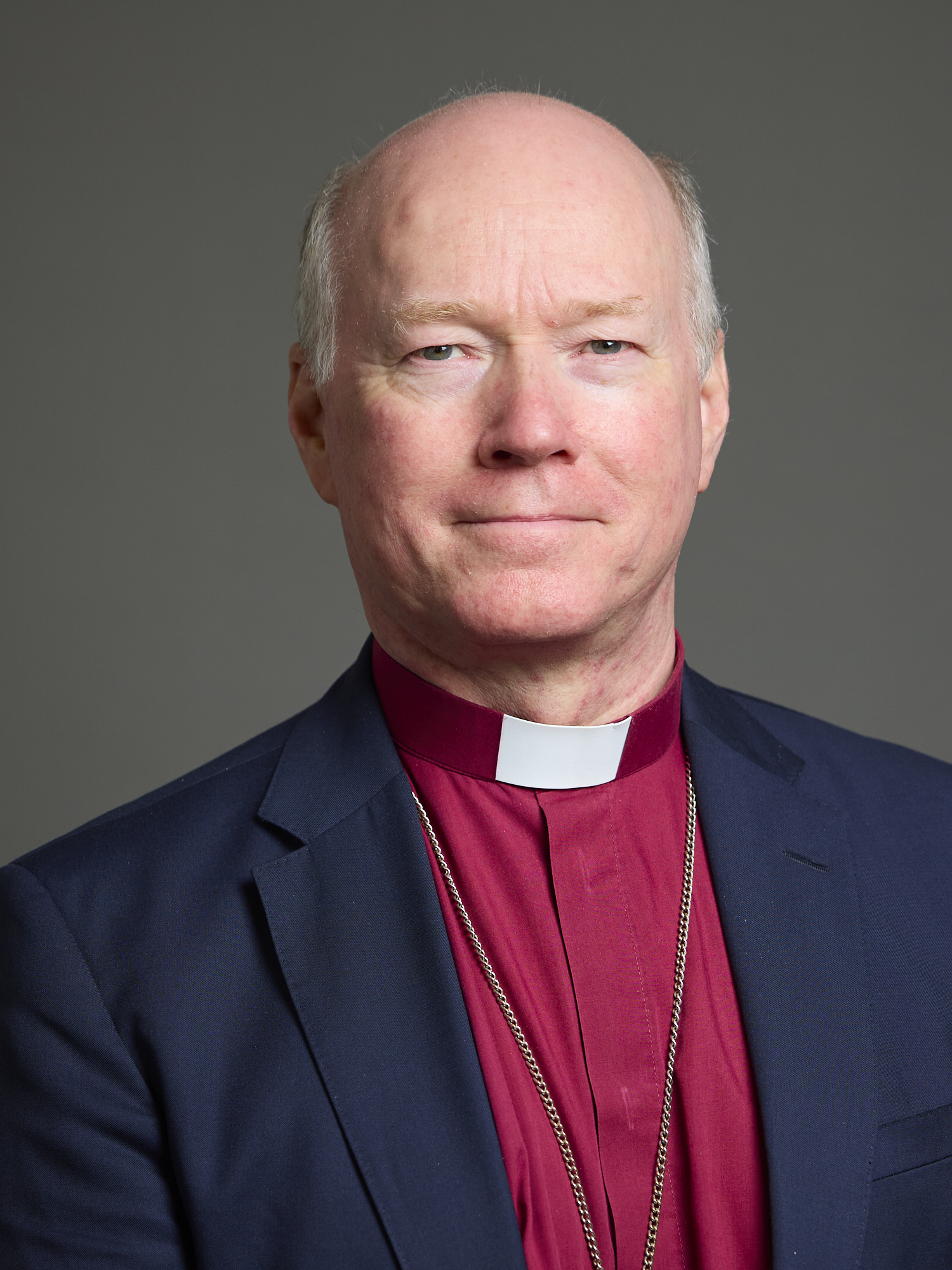
- Official portrait, 2024
- Church: Church of England
- Diocese: Diocese of Southwell and Nottingham
- In office: 2015–present
- Predecessor: Paul Butler
- Other post: Bishop of Kensington (2009–2015)

Orders
- Ordination: 1992 (deacon); 1993 (priest) by David Hope (deacon)
- Consecration: 25 March 2009 by Rowan Williams

Personal details
- Born: 16 January 1968 (age 58) Weston-super-Mare, Somerset, United Kingdom
- Denomination: Anglican
- Residence: Bishop's Manor, Southwell
- Spouse: (m. 1997)
- Children: 3
- Education: Grey College, Durham; Wycliffe Hall, Oxford

Member of the House of Lords
- Lord Spiritual
- Bishop of Southwell and Nottingham; 13 June 2022

Paul Gavin Williams (born 16 January 1968) is a Church of England bishop. Since May 2015, he has been the Bishop of Southwell and Nottingham; from 2009 to 2015, he was the Bishop of Kensington, an area bishop in the Diocese of London.

== Early life ==
Paul Williams was born to Bryan and Heather Williams on 16 January 1968 in Weston-super-Mare, Somerset, England. He was educated in Somerset at Court Fields School, a comprehensive school in Wellington, and at Richard Huish College, a sixth-form college in Taunton. He studied theology at Grey College, Durham, graduating with a Bachelor of Arts (BA) degree in 1989. He trained for ordination at Wycliffe Hall, Oxford, an evangelical Anglican theological college. Paul Williams's mother, Heather, was one of the first women to be ordained priest at Wells Cathedral in 1994. His father was an electrical engineer.

== Ordained ministry ==
Paul Williams was ordained a deacon at Petertide on 28 June 1992 by David Hope, Bishop of London, at St Paul's Cathedral and ordained a priest in 1993. He was a curate at St James with St Matthew's Muswell Hill (1992–1995) and then Associate Vicar at Christ Church, Clifton in Bristol (1995–1999) before becoming the rector of St James's Gerrards Cross with Fulmer (1999–2009). During this time the church saw considerable growth, with six Sunday services spanning contemporary to traditional choral; also a pioneering children's ministry with creative arts. Paul Williams was an honorary canon of Christ Church, Oxford from 2007 to 2009.

=== Episcopal ministry ===
Paul Williams was consecrated to the episcopate on 25 March 2009 by Rowan Williams, Archbishop of Canterbury, at St Paul's Cathedral, London. From 2009 to 2015, he was the Bishop of Kensington, an area bishop in the Diocese of London. Alongside his oversight of 130 churches in West London he also had diocesan responsibility for ministry training and leadership development. On 11 May 2015, Paul Williams' canonical election as Bishop of Southwell and Nottingham was confirmed. He was installed as diocesan bishop during an inauguration service on 27 June 2015 at Southwell Minster. He became a member of the House of Lords upon his introduction (as a Lord Spiritual) on 13 June 2022.

=== Views ===
In 2023, following the news that the House of Bishop's of the Church of England was to introduce proposals for blessing same-sex relationships, he signed an open letter which stated:

many Christians in the Church of England and the Anglican Communion, together with Christians from across the churches of world Christianity, continue to believe that marriage is given by God for the union of a man and woman and that it cannot be extended to those who are of the same sex. [...] Without seeking to diminish the value of many committed same-sex relationships, for which there is much to give thanks, we find ourselves constrained by what we sincerely believe the Scriptures teach which cannot be set aside.

During the Church of England's February 2023 General Synod meeting, Williams was one of four bishops in the house to vote against the successful proposal to introduce blessings and prayers for same-sex relationships. He also voted against introducing "standalone services for same-sex couples" on a trial basis during a meeting of the General Synod in November 2023; the motion passed.

== Personal life ==
Paul married Sarah (née Cossham) at Christ Church, Clifton in February 1997; they have three sons.

== Styles ==
- The Reverend Paul Williams (1993–2007)
- The Reverend Canon Paul Williams (2007–2009)
- The Right Reverend Paul Williams (2009–present)

Church of England titles
| Preceded by Michael Colclough | Bishop of Kensington; 2009–2015 | Succeeded by Graham Tomlin |
| Preceded by Paul Butler | Bishop of Southwell & Nottingham; 2015–present | Incumbent |
