= Hugh Belsey =

British art historian

Hugh Belsey MBE
- Born: May 1954
- Occupation: Historian

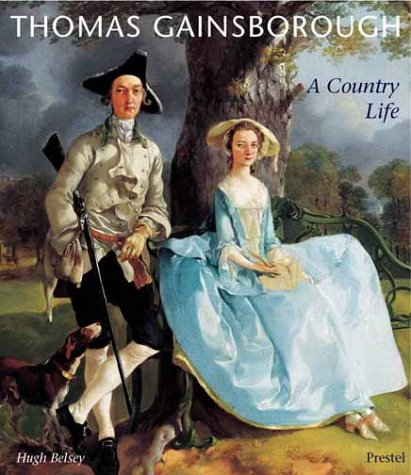
Cover of Thomas Gainsborough: A country life (2002), featuring Mr and Mrs Andrews, c. 1750.

Hugh Graham Belsey, MBE, (born May 1954) is a British art historian who is an authority on the art of Thomas Gainsborough. For 23 years he was the curator of Gainsborough's House in Sudbury. His most recent contribution to Gainsborough scholarship is his catalogue raisonné of Gainsborough's portraits published in February 2019 by the Yale University Press for the Paul Mellon Centre for Studies in British Art.

== Early life and education ==
Hugh Belsey was born in May 1954 in the district of Hemel Hempstead, Hertfordshire. He received his undergraduate degree from the University of Manchester which he followed with a post-graduate diploma in art gallery and museum studies. He earned an MLitt in fine arts from the Barber Institute, University of Birmingham, where he specialised in the Grand Tour and the collecting of George, 3rd Earl Cowper.

== Career ==
Belsey worked at Bowood House in Wiltshire after which he became curator of Gainsborough's House in Sudbury, a position he held for 23 years. He has been a senior research fellow at the Yale Center for British Art during which time he worked upon compiling the catalogue raisonné of the portraits by Thomas Gainsborough published in February 2019. He has also taught a museum course at the University of Buckingham and is known also for his annual lecture series on British art which he delivers in different Suffolk venues. He is often commissioned to write catalogue entries for the major auction houses and fine art dealers on especially Thomas Gainsborough, and the artist's nephew and only pupil Gainsborough Dupont.

Belsey was a founder member of the Constable Trust, and has served as its chairman. He was on the Council of the Association of Independent Museums for ten years.

In 2014, Belsey appeared in the BBC television series Fake or Fortune? in which he authenticated two previously unattributed works, a landscape and a portrait of Joseph Gape, as being by Thomas Gainsborough.

== Selected publications ==
- Gainsborough's family. Gainsborough's House Society, 1988.
- Gainsborough the printmaker. Aldeburgh Foundation, 1988.
- From Gainsborough to Constable: The emergence of naturalism in British landscape painting, 1750–1810. Boydell Press, Woodbridge, 1991. (Editor) ISBN 978-0851153001
- Thomas Churchyard (1798–1865): A bicentenary exhibition from the collections at Christchurch Mansion. Ipswich Borough Council, Ipswich, 1998. ISBN 978-0906688274
- Gainsborough's beautiful Mrs. Graham. National Galleries of Scotland, Edinburgh, 1999. ISBN 978-1903278383
- Love's prospect: Gainsborough's Byam family and the eighteenth century marriage portrait. Holburne Museum of Art, Bath, 2001.
- Gainsborough at Gainsborough's house. Paul Holberton, London, 2002. ISBN 978-1903470060
- Gainsborough Pop! Paul Holberton, London, 2002. (With Christopher Wright) ISBN 978-1903470084
- Thomas Gainsborough: A country life. Prestel, Munich & London. 2002. ISBN 978-3791327846
- Gainsborough's cottage doors: An insight into the artist's last decade. Paul Holberton, London, 2013. ISBN 9781907372506
