= Graham Tomlin =

British theologian, author and bishop

The Right Reverend Graham Tomlin
- Bishop of Kensington
- Church: Church of England
- Diocese: London
- Installed: 2015–2022
- Predecessor: Paul Williams
- Successor: Emma Ineson
- Other posts: President of St Mellitus College lead, Centre for Cultural Witness (2022–present)

Orders
- Ordination: 1986 (deacon); 1987 (priest)
- Consecration: 23 September 2015 by Justin Welby

Personal details
- Born: 1 August 1958 (age 68)
- Denomination: Anglican
- Spouse: Janet
- Education: Lincoln College, Oxford

Graham Stuart Tomlin (born 1 August 1958) is a British theologian, author and Church of England bishop. Since 2022, he has led the Centre for Cultural Witness; he served as Bishop of Kensington, an area bishop in the Diocese of London from 2015 until 2022. From 2007 until 2015, he was dean then principal of St Mellitus College and is now its president.

== Early life ==
Tomlin was born in 1958. His father was a Baptist minister. He was brought up a Christian but became an atheist during his teenage years. He was educated at Bristol Grammar School; the school was at first an all-boys direct grant grammar school before becoming a private school in 1976.

He studied English literature at Lincoln College, Oxford and graduated with a Bachelor of Arts (BA) degree from the University of Oxford in 1980; as per tradition, this BA degree was promoted to a Master of Arts (MA (Oxon)) degree in 1983. He returned to Oxford to study theology and train for ordained ministry at Wycliffe Hall, Oxford. He graduated from the University of Oxford with another BA degree in 1985. He later completed a PhD in theology at the University of Exeter on St Paul, Martin Luther and Blaise Pascal. His doctoral thesis was titled "Foolishness and wisdom: the Theology of the Cross in Paul, Luther and Pascal".

== Ordained ministry ==
Tomlin was ordained in the Church of England as a deacon in 1986 and as a priest in 1987. He was curate of St Leonard's Church in Exeter before returning to Oxford to be chaplain (1989–1994) of Jesus College and a tutor in historical theology and evangelism at Wycliffe Hall, where he eventually became the vice-principal. He was for several years a member of the Faculty of Theology of Oxford University, teaching on the Reformation and contemporary mission and culture, before moving to London in 2005.

He was the principal of St Mellitus College, a new church training institution set up by the bishops of London and Chelmsford, providing theological education across London, Essex, the south west, and the East Midlands. He was also principal of St Paul's Theological Centre, which is based at Holy Trinity Brompton, and a constituent member of St Mellitus College.

Tomlin belongs to the evangelical charismatic tradition of the Church of England.

=== Episcopal ministry ===
On 2 July 2015, it was announced that Tomlin would become Bishop of Kensington, an area bishop in the Diocese of London. On 23 September 2015, he was consecrated a bishop in Canterbury Cathedral by Justin Welby, the Archbishop of Canterbury. in 2017 he was involved in the aftermath of the Grenfell Tower fire in west London, and organised the national memorial service in St Paul's Cathedral in December 2017. He was the Vice Chair of the Archbishop of Canterbury's Commission on Housing, Church and Community.

It was announced in February 2022 that Tomlin was to resign his See during August 2022, in order to lead a new Church of England Centre for Cultural Witness. He duly resigned his See effective 30 August 2022.

== Personal life ==
Tomlin lives in Oxford with his wife, Janet. They have two married children, Sam and Sian. He is an avid supporter of Bristol City Football Club, Manchester United, Irish rugby and English Cricket.

== Publications ==
Tomlin is the author of many articles and several books, including:

- The Power of the Cross: Theology and the Death of Christ in Paul, Luther and Pascal (Paternoster 1999)
- Walking in His Steps: A Guide to Exploring the Land of the Bible (HarperCollins 2001) – with Peter Walker ISBN 9780551032545
- The Provocative Church (SPCK 2002)
- Luther and his World (Lion 2002) – also translated into Hungarian (Luther és kora = Luther and His Age) by Bea Kovács and edited by Scolar Editions Budapest, 2003. Translated into Swedish, "Luther och hans värld" By Gerd Swensson 2017, Votum.
- The Responsive Church: Listening to Our World – Listening to God (Inter-Varsity Press 2005) – with Nick Spencer
- Spiritual Fitness: Christian Character in a Consumer Culture (Continuum 2006) ISBN 9780826486776
- The Seven Deadly Sins and How to Overcome Them (Lion Hudson 2007)
- Looking Through The Cross – The Archbishop of Canterbury's Lent Book 2014 (Bloomsbury Continuum)
- The Widening Circle (SPCK)
- Bound to be Free (Bloomsbury)
- Why Being Yourself is a Bad Idea (SPCK, 2020) ISBN 9780281081790
- Blaise Pascal: The Man Who Made the Modern World (2025)

Church of England titles
Preceded by Paul Williams	Bishop of Kensington; 2015–2022	Emma Ineson
