= Wooded Landscape with a Herdsman Seated =

Painting by Thomas Gainsborough

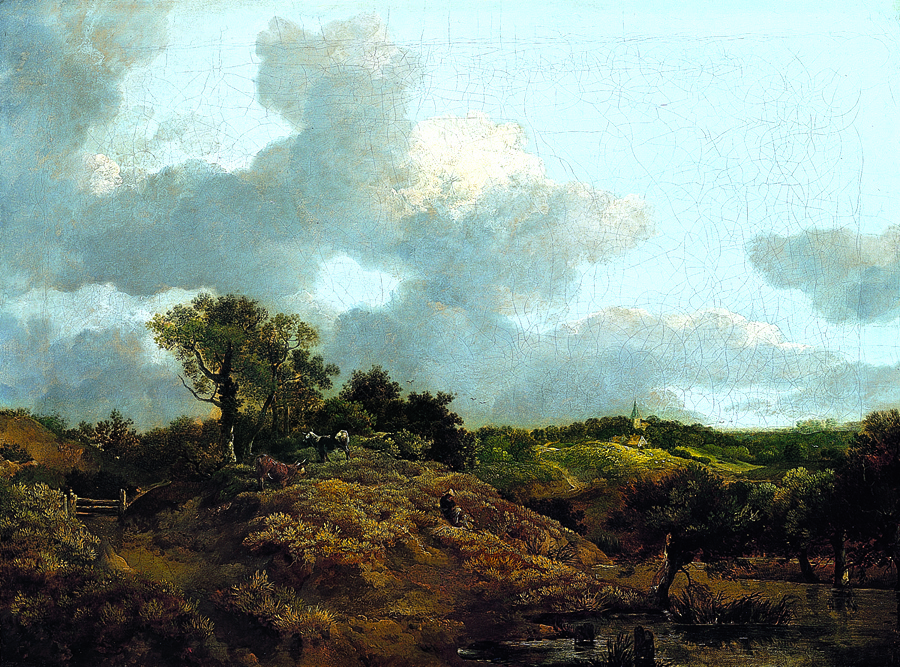
- Artist: Thomas Gainsborough
- Year: 1748
- Medium: oil on canvas
- Dimensions: 49 cm × 65 cm (19 in × 26 in)
- Location: Gainsborough's House, Sudbury

Wooded Landscape with a Herdsman Seated is an oil on canvas painting by the English artist Thomas Gainsborough, from 1748. It is held in the Gainsborough's House, in Sudbury.

== History and description ==
Gainsborough's earliest landscape paintings were painted in the second half of the 1740s, after he had returned to his hometown of Sudbury after having studied art in London, among others in the circle of William Hogarth. They clearly show the strong influence of the 17th-century Dutch landscape painting. At the same time, his works often depict the environment around Sudbury, where Gainsborough spent his formative years. This early landscape is believed to show Great Henny, near Sudbury. The painting shows a resting shepherd and his flock of cattle in a Suffolk landscape. Against the horizon, a church with a tall church tower is outlined, reminiscent of the church of St. Andrews in Great Cornard, located near Gainsborough's birthplace.

== Provenance ==
The painting was sold at Christie's 1985, and once again at Sotheby's in 1986. It was purchased with support from the National Art Collections Fund, for £220,000, in 1990.
