= Eddie Shirras =

British priest of the Church of England (1937–2020)

Edward Scott Shirras (23 April 1937 – 3 October 2020) was a British priest of the Church of England. He was the Archdeacon of Northolt from 1985 to 1992.

Shirras was educated at Sevenoaks School and the University of St Andrews. After curacies at Christ Church, Surbiton and Jesmond Parish Church he was Youth Secretary of the Church Pastoral Aid Society from 1968 to 1971; its Publications Secretary until 1974 and Assistant General Secretary until 1975. Following this, he was Vicar of Christ Church, Roxeth then Area Dean of Harrow until his archdeacon’s appointment. After this he was Vicar of Christ Church, Winchester, from 1992 to 2001 and then priest in charge of Marcham with Garford until 2009.

Shirras died on 3 October 2020, at the age of 83.

Church of England titles
Preceded by Thomas Frederick Butler	Archdeacon of Northolt; 1985–1992	Succeeded by Michael John Colclough
