= John Hughes (bishop of Kensington) =

Anglican Bishop of Kensington

The Right Reverend John Hughes
- Bishop of Kensington
- Diocese: Diocese of London
- In office: 1987–August 1994 (died in office)
- Predecessor: Mark Santer
- Successor: Michael Colclough
- Other posts: Dean of Theology, University College, Cardiff (1984–1987)

Orders
- Ordination: 1960 (deacon); 1961 (priest)
- Consecration: 1987

Personal details
- Born: 30 January 1935
- Died: 19 August 1994 (aged 59)
- Denomination: Anglican
- Parents: Joseph and Amy Fisher
- Spouse: Maureen Harrison (m. 1963)
- Children: 2
- Profession: Academic (church history)
- Education: Queens' College, Cambridge

John George Hughes (30 January 1935 – 19 August 1994) was the ninth area Bishop of Kensington.

Hughes was educated at Queens' College, Cambridge. Ordained in 1961, he began his ministry as a curate in Brighouse and was then, successively, vicar of St John's Clifton, Director of Education in the Diocese of Wakefield, secretary of the Advisory Council for the Church's Ministry and warden of St. Michael's College, Llandaff, before being ordained to the episcopate – a position he held from 1987 until his death in August 1994, aged 59.

The future Archbishop of Canterbury Justin Welby was at first rejected for ordination by Hughes, who told him that "There is no place for you in the Church of England."

Church of England titles
Preceded by Mark Santer	Bishop of Kensington; 1987–1994	Succeeded by Michael Colclough
