= Graham Dow =

British Anglican bishop

The Right Reverend Graham Dow
- Bishop of Carlisle
- Diocese: Carlisle
- In office: 2000 – April 2009 (retired)
- Predecessor: Ian Harland
- Successor: James Newcome
- Other post: Bishop of Willesden (1992–2000)

Orders
- Ordination: 1967 (deacon); 1968 (priest)
- Consecration: 22 May 1992

Personal details
- Born: 4 July 1942 (age 84) Edmonton, London
- Denomination: Anglican
- Parents: Ronald and Dorothy Christie
- Spouse: Molly Sturges (m. 1966)
- Children: 3 adult sons; 1 adult daughter
- Education: The Queen's College, Oxford

Member of the House of Lords
- Lord Spiritual
- Bishop of Carlisle; 8 November 2007 – 30 April 2009

Geoffrey Graham Dow (born 4 July 1942) is a retired British Anglican bishop. He was the Bishop of Carlisle from 2000 to 2009, the 66th holder of the office. He is a well-known Evangelical.

== Early life ==
Born in 1942, in Edmonton, London, Dow was educated at St Albans School and The Queen's College, Oxford.

== Ordained ministry ==
Dow was ordained in the Church of England as a deacon in 1967 and as a priest in 1968. From 1967 to 1972, he served his curacy at Tonbridge Parish Church in the Diocese of Rochester. He was then chaplain to St John's College, Oxford from 1972 to 1975, and lecturer in Christian Doctrine at St John's College, Nottingham from 1975 to 1981.

Dow was the vicar of Holy Trinity Church, Coventry He was then appointed as Bishop of Willesden, an area bishopric in the Diocese of London, in 1992. He was consecrated as bishop on 22 May 1992 at St Paul's Cathedral, by George Carey, Archbishop of Canterbury. He ordained the first group of women in Diocese of London on 16 April 1994. By September 1995, he was still the only bishop of the diocese who would ordain women to the priesthood.

Dow was made the Bishop of Carlisle in 2000 and retired from this position at the end of April 2009. In retirement, he has been an honorary assistant bishop in the Diocese of Chester since 2009 and the Diocese of Manchester since 2011.

== Position and statements ==
Dow was one of the rebel bishops who signed a letter against Rowan Williams' decision not to block the appointment of Jeffrey John as Bishop of Reading in 2003.

In 2005, Dow attracted media attention when he said that a stone in Carlisle inscribed with a 16th-century curse should be removed. The curse was pronounced on the Border Reivers by the Archbishop of Glasgow and was inscribed on a stone as part of the city's millennium celebrations. Subsequently, some Carlisle residents blamed disasters, such as an outbreak of foot-and-mouth disease, flooding and the relegation of the local football team from its league on the presence of the stone. Dow stated that "The original curse was not a godly act. For this reason I have always said that it would be better if the stone were not there" and said he intended to ask the current archbishop of Glasgow, Mario Conti, to come to Carlisle and perform a blessing to remove the curse.

Dow's activities have included giving a blessing at the launch of HMS Astute in Barrow-in-Furness on 8 June 2007.

=== Natural disasters as divine retribution ===
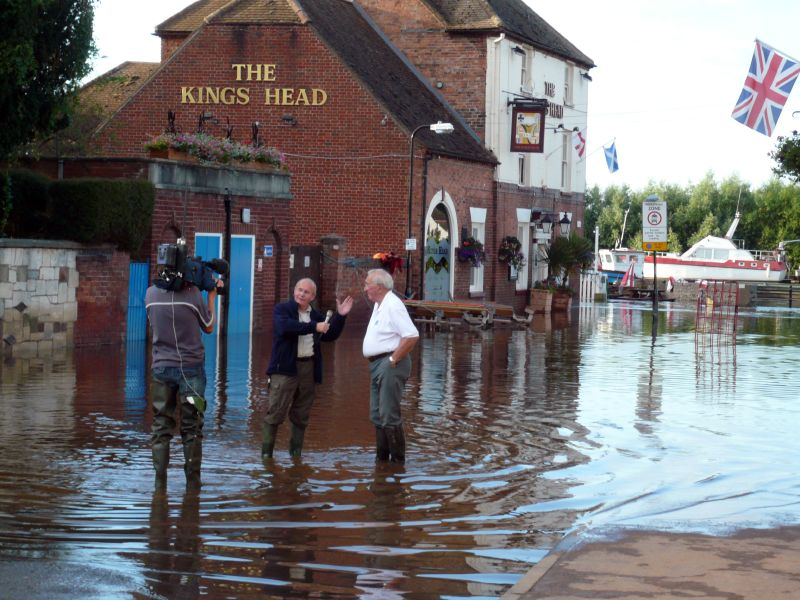
Flooding in 2007, described by Dow as "God's judgement" on society's "moral degradation"

In July 2007, following widespread storms over parts of the United Kingdom, Dow stated that he believed the resulting flooding (in which several people were killed) was an act of divine retribution, the result of God's "strong and definite judgement" on the "moral degradation" of British society. In particular, he blamed the economic exploitation of poorer nations and the United Kingdom's introduction of laws aimed at reducing discrimination against gay people, notably the proposals to introduce same-sex marriage. He stated that "the Sexual Orientation Regulations are part of a general scene of permissiveness. We are in a situation where we are liable for God's judgement."

According to an article in The Times, Dow is a specialist in exorcism, explaining in a leaflet entitled Explaining Deliverance that "There is a view that both oral and anal sexual practice is liable to allow entry to spirits."

== Personal life ==
Dow is married to Molly and they have four adult children.
