= Sudbury Grammar School =

Location
- School Street; Sudbury, Suffolk
- Coordinates: 52.0375°N 0.7266°E

Information
- Type: Grammar school
- Established: 1491
- Closed: 1972
- Local authority: West Suffolk
- Gender: Boys
- Age: 11 to 18
- Fate: Became Sudbury Upper School in 1972

Sudbury Grammar School was a boys' grammar school in Sudbury, Suffolk. The school was founded in 1491. In 1972, the school was amalgamated with other local schools to form Sudbury Upper School.

== History ==
The school was founded in 1491 by a bequest of by the Warden of Sudbury College, the reverend William Wood, donating a building previously used as a farmhouse for the purpose and providing an income for a "good and honest man" to be the schoolmaster.

In the early 19th century, the school's patron Sir Lachlan Maclean, appropriated the traditional income for the school and had the medieval farmhouse rebuilt at a cost of £700 so that it could be rented out as a private school. The townspeople brought a lawsuit against Maclean which resulted in the closure of the school in 1841 and finally brought about the establishment of a modern grammar school in 1858. A new schoolroom and master's house were built to the design of Robert Philip Pope at a cost of £2,500, the Reverend John Cooke being the only staff member. By 1895 there were 38 day boys and 24 boarders. In 1909, control of the school passed from an independent trust to West Suffolk County Council. In 1923, the secondary school at Hadleigh closed and the boys travelled by bus to Sudbury; extra classroom accommodation was provided in the form of an old army hut which the boys had to assemble themselves. In 1929, a playing field was acquired in Acton Lane and in 1939 a new building was started in the school playground, but was not completed until after the war.

The analogous school for girls was Sudbury High School, which later became a bi-lateral school. There was flexible transfer from the Sudbury Secondary Modern School, a boys' school - upwards and downwards.

In December 1966, seven sixth form boys made a formal protest about the admission of Prince Charles to Trinity College, Cambridge, who they claimed had entered by a backdoor entry method.

Following the decision by the county council in 1966 to adopt the Comprehensive system, a new school was constructed in Tudor Road and Sudbury Grammar School finally closed in 1972. The school building was then used by All Saints Middle School until 1987, when it was acquired by Babergh District Council as sheltered accommodation, restoring the 1857 building, now known as William Wood House after the founder, and replacing the 1940s buildings with a sympathetic apartment block. The school hall, cloister and headmaster's house are Grade II listed buildings.

=== Former teachers ===
- Captain Robert Stewart Smylie, headmaster c.1911-1914; commissioned into the Royal Scots Fusiliers, killed in action during the Battle of the Somme on 14 July 1916 while serving as company commander to C Company, 1st Battalion.
- Claude Abbott, Professor of English Language and Literature from 1932-54 at Durham University

== Former pupils ==
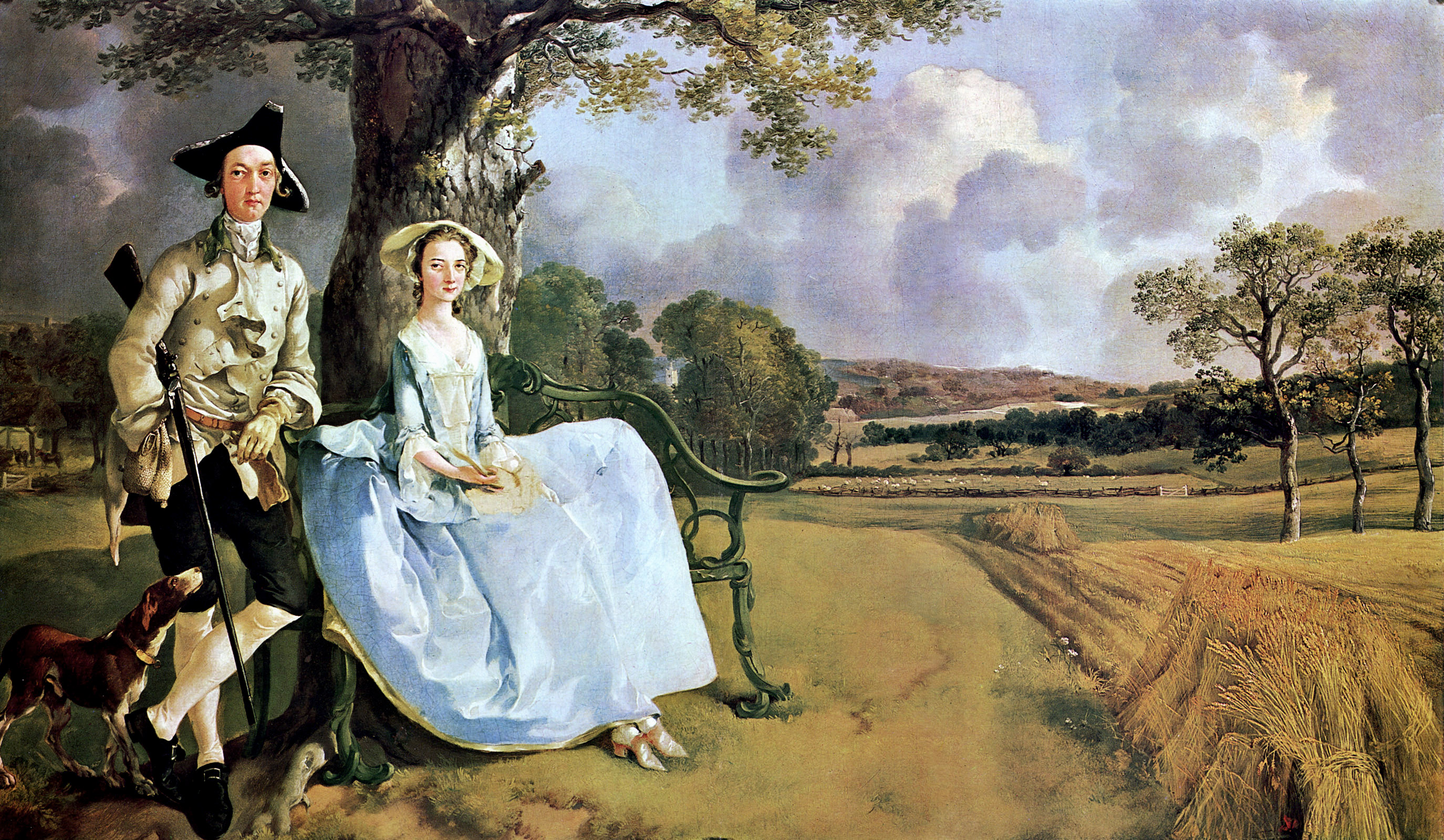
One old boy paints another, c. 1750, in Mr and Mrs Andrews by Thomas Gainsborough

- William Holman Bentley (1855–1905), Baptist Missionary Society missionary in the Congo
- Thomas Gainsborough, painter, two years below Robert Andrews, who he painted in his famous Mr and Mrs Andrews (c. 1750)
- Michael Goodman, Child Support Commissioner from 1993-8, Social Security Commissioner from 1979–98, and Professor of Law from 1971-6 at Durham University
- Sir Leander Starr Jameson, Prime Minister from 1904-8 of the Cape Colony, and the inspiration for Rudyard Kipling's famous 1895 poem If—
- Sir George Murray Humphry (1820–1896), professor of physiology and anatomy at Cambridge, surgeon, gerontologist and medical writer
- John Eric Loverseed, military pilot and politician
- Prof Keith Morton, Professor of Numerical Analysis from 1983-97 at the University of Oxford, Professor of Applied Maths from 1972-83 at the University of Reading, and Winner in 2002 of the IMA Gold Medal
- Venerable Roy Southwell, Archdeacon of Northolt, 1970 - 1980
- Wickham Steed, Editor from February 1919 - November 1922 of The Times newspaper
- Sir Roger Walters CBE, architect, commissioned the Thames Barrier
- Andy 'Dog' Johnson, artist and illustrator
- Prof Paul Senior, Director of Hallam Centre for Community Justice and latterly Emeritus Professor of Probation Studies at Sheffield Hallam University (1964–1970)
