= St Mellitus College =

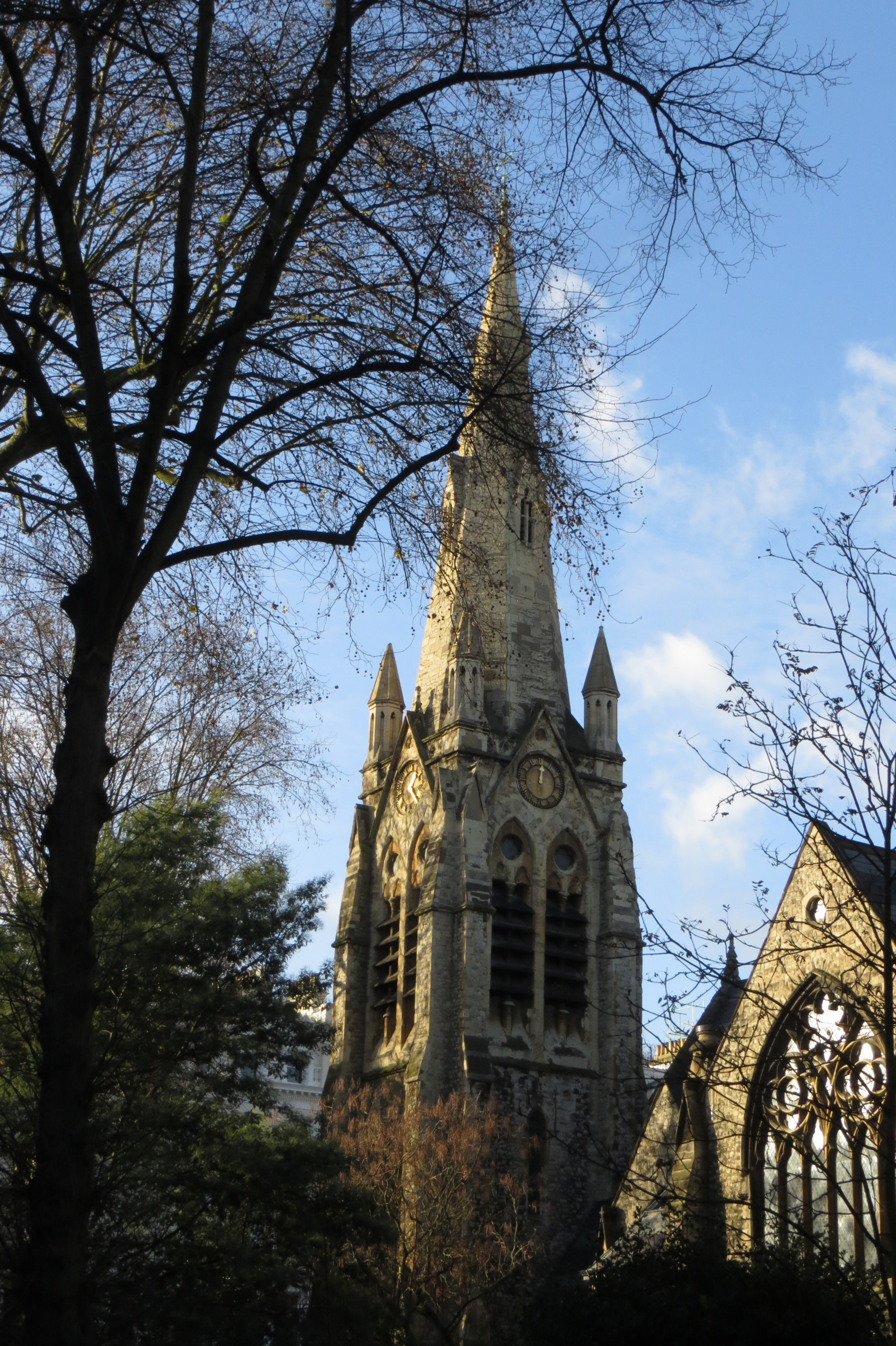

Location
- 24 Collingham Road SW5 0LX; London; England; 51.49347284513437°N 0.18793485210543803°W

Information
- Motto: Theology in the context of worship, unity and mission.
- Religious affiliation: Church of England
- Established: 2007
- Founder: Richard Chartres; John Gladwin
- Dean: Russell Winfield
- President: Graham Tomlin
- Enrolment: 300
- Website: stmellitus.ac.uk

St Mellitus College is an English theological college established in 2007 by the Diocese of London and the Diocese of Chelmsford of the Church of England. It has campuses in Earl's Court, Chelmsford, Plymouth, and Nottingham, with growing links with other churches, colleges and dioceses throughout the United Kingdom and beyond. The president is Graham Tomlin, Bishop of Kensington, and the dean is Russell Winfield. St Mellitus College is a wholly non-residential college and has pioneered context-based training within the Church of England, integrating academic theological study with ministry placements throughout the course of study.

As of 2019, it is the largest ministerial training college in the Church of England. As of 2025, St Mellitus trains nearly a quarter of all new Anglican clergy.

== History ==
Named after the first Bishop of London, whose territory covered London and Essex, the college was founded in 2007 by the bishops of London and Chelmsford to serve the church’s mission in those regions and beyond. The college was formed as a merger between the former North Thames Ministerial Training Course, which was based in the dioceses of London and Chelmsford, and St Paul’s Theological Centre (part of Holy Trinity, Brompton).

It has grown significantly since being founded and moved into its own premises at St Jude's Church, Kensington, in 2012, a building renovated specifically for this purpose. The centre houses a range of teaching space, rooms for pastoral care, academic and administrative offices, a growing academic library, space for hospitality and college worship.

In 2013, St Mellitus North West was established at Liverpool Cathedral, reestablishing full-time Anglican ordination training in that area for the first time in more than 40 years. This venture was directed by Jill Duff (now Bishop of Lancaster), in partnership with five dioceses in that area (Blackburn, Carlisle, Chester, Liverpool and Manchester). In September 2017, St Mellitus South West was launched, based in St Matthias Plymouth. St Mellitus College opened its centre in the East Midlands in 2019, after being invited to pioneer full-time context-based ordination training in the region by the dioceses of Southwell & Nottingham, Leicester and Derby

In 2017, the college launched a programme in Bermuda in conjunction with the Anglican Church of Bermuda. As of December 2021, it had trained 20 students for ministry.

== Leadership ==
Deans

- 2007–2015: Graham Tomlin
- 2016–2020: Andy Emerton
- 2020–2025: Russell Winfield
- 2025–present: Sara Schumacher (interim)

== Organisation and purpose ==
The college offers courses for many different kinds of students, including:

- Anglican ordinands looking for full or part-time training, including for self-supporting and pioneer ministry
- Lay workers and licensed lay ministers (LLMs, also known as readers)
- Undergraduate students on certificate, diploma and BA courses in theology, ministry and mission, or theology and youth ministry
- Postgraduate students on the MA in Christian Leadership, or MA in Theology, Ministry and Mission (specialising in systematic theology
- Church leaders from a range of denominations wanting to study theology and ministry more deeply
- Those looking for an introduction to the study of theology, through the Beginning Theology programme, non-accredited study, or the School of Theology from SPTC
- Those wanting to learn more about church planting under the guidance of associate tutor Ric Thorpe (Bishop of Islington)

The college's programmes are validated by the universities of Durham or Middlesex, depending on the course.

Mellitus' "growth mentality" has been an inspiration to other colleges, such as St Hild College in Yorkshire, established in 2017.

== Name and link to college mission ==
The college is named after St Mellitus, one of the least known but most significant figures in the establishment of the church in London and Essex – a key moment in the conversion of the British Isles. Mellitus was sent to England by Pope Gregory the Great, following in the footsteps of St Augustine who had made the same journey a few years before.

== Notable alumni ==
- Stephen Cottrell (MA, 2019)
- Tim Hughes (ordination training)
- Mike Pilavachi (ordination training)
