= Lusa Nsenga-Ngoy =

Anglican bishop

The Right Reverend Lusa Nsenga-Ngoy
- Bishop of Willesden
- Church: Church of England
- Diocese: London
- In office: 2022 to present
- Predecessor: Pete Broadbent

Orders
- Ordination: 2008 (deacon); 2009 (priest)
- Consecration: 25 January 2022 by Justin Welby

Personal details
- Born: June 1977 (age 49) Democratic Republic of the Congo
- Denomination: Anglicanism
- Education: Cranmer Hall, Durham

Lusa Nsenga-Ngoy (born June 1977) is an Anglican bishop. Since 2022, he has served as Bishop of Willesden, a suffragan bishop in the Church of England's Diocese of London.

== Biography ==
Nsenga-Ngoy was born in June 1977 in the Democratic Republic of the Congo. In 1985, aged 8, he moved with his family to Belgium. He studied theology at the Faculté Universitaire de Théologie Protestante in Brussels. From 2001 to 2007, he was then Pasteur to the Église Protestante Française de Cantorbéry (French Protestant Church of Canterbury). Following this, he trained for Anglican ministry at Cranmer Hall, Durham.

Nsenga-Ngoy was ordained in the Church of England as a deacon in 2008 and as a priest in 2009. He served his curacy at All Saints Church, Staplehurst, in the Diocese of Canterbury between 2008 and 2012. He then became Vicar of St Aidan's Church, Gravesend in 2012. Then, from 2017 until his elevation to the episcopate, he was BAME Mission and Ministry Enabler in the Diocese of Leicester.

In November 2021, he was announced as the next Bishop of Willesden, a suffragan area bishop in the Diocese of London. He was consecrated as a bishop by Justin Welby, the Archbishop of Canterbury, during a service at St Paul's Cathedral on 25 January 2022.

== Personal life ==
Nsenga-Ngoy is married to Mirjam Ngoy-Verhage with whom he has three children.

== Selected works ==
- Ross-McNairn, Jonathon, ed. (2014). "Chapter 7: Lusa Nsenga-Ngoy". Being a Curate: Stories of what it's really like. SPCK. ISBN 978-0-281-07097-8.
