= Emma Ineson =

British Anglican bishop and academic

The Right Reverend Dr Emma Ineson
- Area Bishop of Kensington
- Diocese: Diocese of London
- In office: 2023 to present
- Predecessor: Graham Tomlin
- Other posts: Principal of Trinity College, Bristol (2014–2019); Bishop of Penrith (2019–2021); Bishop to the Archbishops of Canterbury and York (2021–2023)

Orders
- Ordination: 2 July 2000 (deacon); 4 July 2001 (priest) by Jack Nicholls
- Consecration: 27 February 2019 by John Sentamu

Personal details
- Born: 1969 (age 56–57) Birmingham, England
- Denomination: Anglicanism
- Spouse: Mat
- Children: Two
- Education: University of Birmingham; Trinity College, Bristol

Emma Gwynneth Ineson (born 1969) is a British Anglican bishop and academic, specialising in practical theology. Since 2023, she has served as Bishop of Kensington, the area bishop for West London. From 2014 to 2019, she was Principal of Trinity College, Bristol, an evangelical Anglican theological college; from 2019 to 2021, she was Bishop of Penrith, the suffragan bishop of the Diocese of Carlisle; and from 2021 to 2023, she served as "Bishop to the Archbishops of Canterbury and York", i.e. assistant bishop on the staffs of both archbishops.

== Early life and education ==
Ineson was born in 1969 in Birmingham, England. She was brought up in Kenya and South Wales. She studied English language and linguistics at the University of Birmingham, graduating with a Bachelor of Arts (BA) degree in 1992 and a Master of Philosophy (MPhil) degree in 1993. She undertook postgraduate research in the "power and authority in the language of worship" at Birmingham, and completed her Doctor of Philosophy (PhD) degree in 1998.

At the age of 24, Ineson felt the call to ordination. While studying for her doctorate, she entered Trinity College, Bristol, an evangelical Anglican theological college to train for ordained ministry. She also studied theology and graduated with a further BA degree in 1999.

== Ordained ministry ==
Ineson was ordained in the Church of England: made deacon at Petertide 2000 (2 July) at Sheffield Cathedral (with her husband among others) and ordained a priest the following Petertide (4 July 2001; with her husband alone) at their title church — both times they were ordained by Jack Nicholls, Bishop of Sheffield. From 2000 to 2003, she undertook her curacy at Christ Church, Dore in the Diocese of Sheffield: unusually, this was a job-share with her husband. She then moved to Devon where she was a chaplain to the Lee Abbey, an ecumenical Christian community, between 2003 and 2006.

In 2006, Ineson returned to Bristol having been appointed a non-stipendiary minister in the Parish of St Matthew and St Nathanael, Bristol. In 2007, she was additionally made a tutor in practical and pastoral theology at her alma mater Trinity College, Bristol. From 2013 to 2014, she served as chaplain to the Bishop of Bristol (then Mike Hill). In April 2014, she once more returned to Trinity College, Bristol having been appointed its principal in succession to George Iype Kovoor.

=== Episcopal ministry ===
On 9 May 2018, it was announced that Ineson would be the next Bishop of Penrith, the suffragan bishop of the Diocese of Carlisle, in succession to Robert Freeman. On 27 February 2019, she was consecrated as a bishop by John Sentamu, Archbishop of York, during a service at York Minster. Since July 2019, she has also served as Central Chaplain of the Mothers' Union.

On 19 April 2021, it was announced that Ineson was to move to Lambeth Palace, to become "Bishop to the Archbishops of Canterbury and York". She took up the appointment on 1 June 2021, replacing the Bishop at Lambeth as episcopal assistant to Justin Welby, Archbishop of Canterbury; and adding to this assisting Stephen Cottrell, Archbishop of York, coordinating between Lambeth and Bishopthorpe, and overseeing the Lambeth Conference 2022 programme. Since 2022, she was also an honorary assistant bishop in the Diocese of Southwark.

On 15 December 2022, it was announced that she would be the next Bishop of Kensington, an area bishop in the Diocese of London. She was translated to the See of Kensington upon swearing the oaths at a service on 19 February 2023; and became area bishop for West London in the same service.

Ineson has been described as an evangelical with "traditional views on human sexuality".

Following the appointment of Sarah Mullally as Archbishop of Canterbury in October 2025, it was announced that Ineson would become acting Bishop of London and area bishop for the Two Cites, in addition to her substantive appointment as Bishop of Kensington.

== Personal life ==
Ineson is married to Mat Ineson, who is also an Anglican priest. They had met while studying at the University of Birmingham, and went together to Trinity College, Bristol to train for ordained ministry. They have two children.

== Honours ==
In February 2016, Ineson was appointed an Honorary Chaplain to the Queen (QHC). She was one of 33 honorary chaplains who are part of the Ecclesiastical Household and occasionally preach at the Chapel Royal. She relinquished the appointment upon becoming a bishop in 2019.

Church of England titles
Preceded by Graham Tomlin	Bishop of Kensington; 2023–present	Incumbent
