= Gainsborough's House =

Birthplace of painter Thomas Gainsborough and museum in Sudbury, England

Coordinates: 52°2′17.6″N 0°43′42.3″E

The front fascia of Gainsborough's Historic House in Sudbury, Suffolk, UK.

Gainsborough's House is the birthplace of the leading English painter Thomas Gainsborough. It is now a museum and gallery, located at 46 Gainsborough Street in Sudbury, Suffolk, England. It is a Grade I listed building. Some of the pictures on display have been acquired with the help of the Art Fund.

== Overview ==
The house is now 46 Gainsborough Street and dates back to around 1520. Thomas Gainsborough's parents, John and Mary Gainsborough, probably moved here in 1722 and the artist Thomas Gainsborough was born five years later (1727). Thomas Gainsborough, the youngest of John and Mary's nine children, lived in the house and attended Sudbury Grammar School. At 13 he went to London to further his studies training with the French painter and illustrator, Hubert-Francois Gravelot.

The house remained as a private residence until 1920, after which time it had various functions including a guest house and antique shop. In 1958, Gainsborough's House Society was formed to purchase the house and establish it as a museum and monument to Thomas Gainsborough. The museum opened to the public in 1961.

== History ==
The oldest visible part of the house is the oak doorway into the entrance room, which could date back to 1490.

Four distinct periods may be discerned in its architecture. The original house, represented today only by the Entrance Hall and Aubrey Herbert Room, probably dates back to around 1500. The oak doorway, was probably the original front door to the house, leading straight into the Entrance Hall from the street. Houses of the late 15th century show a type of structure closely related to the timbering visible in the Entrance Hall. The fireplace with its heavy oak lintel may have been a later addition to the room, being a common feature of early 17th century rooms.

Around 1600, a house was built next door. The Parlour, across the corridor from the Entrance Hall, is the only visible part of this house, to have survived, and even there the character of the room has been greatly altered by subsequent modernisations.

The basic structure of most houses of this period was made up of a skeleton of oak beams. The panels between those beams were filled with "plaster". In this particular case, the plaster was applied on to hazel sticks wedged between the timbers. It was composed of clay soil mixed with about half its bulk of reeds, both leaf and stem of which were used, and which were very plentiful in East Anglia. Such plaster was known as wattle and daub, raddle and daub, or pug, and was applied simultaneously by two men one on either side of the wall. This was allowed to dry hard before whitewashing, and was very tough, having the added advantage of being cheap. It was not, however, an entirely satisfactory building material, as it tended to shrink away from the beams in dry weather, and soaked up the moisture in wet weather. The interior walls would have been wainscoted with oak panelling usually "chair-high", the rest being stuccoed and covered either with wallpaper, or painted decoration.

The structural beams would not, by the early 18th century, have been visible inside the house. The floors, which in the 16th century would have consisted of packed earth and ox-blood covered with herbed straw, would by this time, have been boarded with oak planks. In the absence of proper stains and polishes, 18th century housewives had to improvise; John Wood, when commenting upon the effected of his improvements in Bath recalls that:

"About the year 1727, the Boards of the Dining Room and other floors were made of a Brown Colour, with soot and small Beer, to hide the Dirt, as well as their own imperfections‚ the Chimney Pieces, Hearths and Slabbs were all of Free Stone and they were daily cleaned with a particular White-wash, which soon rendered the brown Floors like the Starry Firmament."

Gainsborough's parents bought the house for £230 in 1722 and it remained in the family until 1792. When the house was sold at auction, it was described as:

"consisting of a most excellent Brickt Mansion... replete with every convenient Accommodation for a genteel Family, or principal Manufacturer, having upon the Premises two Buildings... 147 Feet long, with an Orchard, well planted with Fruit Trees in a high state of Perfection, which with a Flower Garden, paved Yard, and Scite of the Buildings, contain about two acres."

It continued as a private residence until the 1920s when it was converted into a guest house and tearooms. Lunches and teas were served and they also catered for wedding receptions. The garden was frequently open in the summer, both for teas and the hire of the two tennis courts. Photographs and reminiscences from this time indicate that the house adapted well for this purpose and was popular with both guests and locals alike.

After the Second World War, the house had various functions including a period as an antique shop. In the mid 1950s, Mr Doward, an English art dealer working in America who had rediscovered a Gainsborough painting, bought the house intending to live in it. However, he failed to convince his wife to move to Sudbury. Therefore, in 1956 the house was once again put up for sale.

== Museum ==
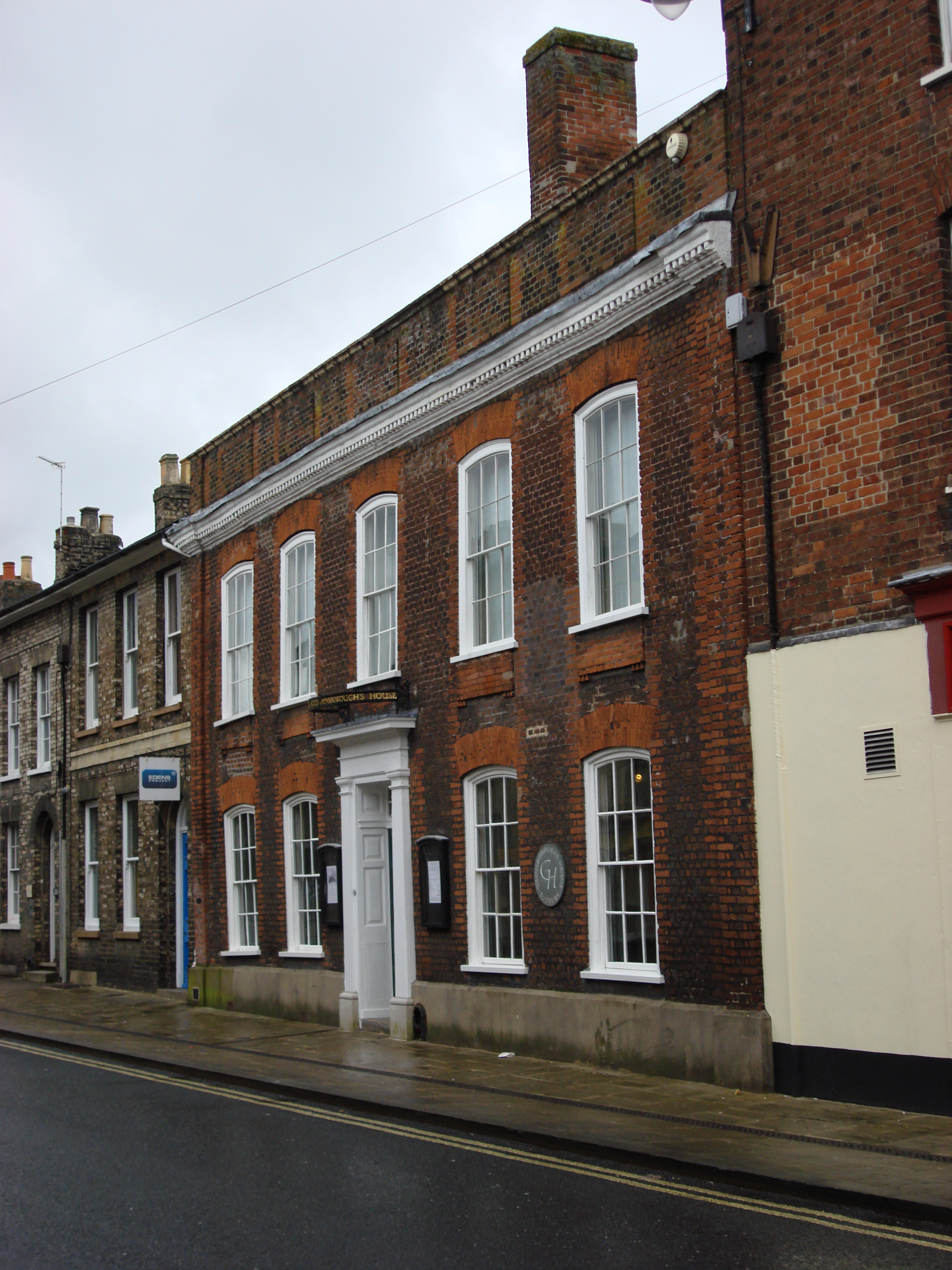
Gainsborough's House in Sudbury, England.

Initially, interest was stimulated by individuals: Michael Harvard, Aubrey Herbert and Sir Alfred Munnings. By October 1956, a Gainsborough's House National Appeal Committee was formed, under the Chairmanship of the Mayor of Sudbury, Councillor Arthur Essex JP. The committee brought together local businessmen and politicians, as well as those interested in art and history. Initially the President was the John Rous, 4th Earl of Stradbroke (Lord Lieutenant of Suffolk) and the Vice-President was the artist Sir Alfred Munnings KCVC, PPRA, who lived at nearby Dedham.

Appeals were made to all sections of the local community. From the beginning, the House was to be a centre for the arts, as well as a museum and monument to Gainsborough. Fund-raising included collection boxes in local hotels as well as in major galleries around the country.

Artists were particularly supportive. Sir Alfred Munnings hoped to encourage others to make major donations, when in 1957 he gave £1,500, the proceeds of the sale of his painting of the Queen's horse, Aureole. The house was purchased on 20 January 1958 for £5,250. By September, the Gainsborough's House Society was formally established to run the museum as an independent charity.

Following the successful acquisition of the building, local companies and individuals also gave materials and their labour to help renovate the building and the garden. The museum was formally opened on 12 April 1961. The house opened as a public museum in 1961 but there was no permanent collection as such. People were encouraged to donate or to lend works of art, furniture, decorative objects or Gainsborough memorabilia to furnish the house, as well as Gainsborough paintings, drawings and reproductions. Including two Gainsborough drawings, teapots and a 17th-century chair. Other works deposited here in 1961 are still on permanent display in the House. Amongst these are five pieces of furniture on loan from the V&A and the six portraits by Gainsborough initially loaned by Lord de Saumarez, which have since been acquired.

Appeals for funds were ongoing. Major building work was carried out in 1967 and, initially, it was hoped to raise money for an endowment for the House to be taken over by the National Trust, a scheme that was later abandoned. In 2000, a Friends organisation was established to help with fundraising and a programme of social events. A successful appeal for over £1 million was raised to renovate the cottages and the main house and garden, which was carried out from 2005–7.

Since the initial appeal in the 1950s, artists have responded to the House and its attractive walled garden. The image of the historic house itself, as much as that of the artist or his work, has been most widely used to promote the museum.

The museum underwent a transformational refurbishment starting in 2019; the National Centre for Thomas Gainsborough was upgraded with a new gallery and exhibition space accompanying the artist's original home. Due to the Heritage Fund, the Sudbury based gallery was granted a £10m investment. The gallery space was re-opened to the public 21 November 2022.

== Thomas Gainsborough ==
Throughout the 18th century, landscape painting was considered a rather lowly branch of art. However Gainsborough was innovative in often fusing these two genres within the same composition. Gainsborough was the first important British artist to consistently paint landscape and it provided the ideal subject for his poetic vision.

While Gainsborough sold some of his landscapes, he found portraiture more lucrative. At the height of his career, from the 1760s onwards, the demands for his portraits were such that he suffered from overwork. Unlike many other painters of the time, Gainsborough was an avid draughtsman. He was always an experimental artist, using a wide range of drawing or printmaking techniques. In his later years, Gainsborough expanded his subject matter with some mythological and 'fancy' pictures with a stronger narrative content. Gainsborough's painting method was technically sound and his works have survived relatively well. It is his painting style, particularly his fluent brushwork, as well as his 'naturalism' that have been so admired by later generations.

Gainsborough attended Sudbury Grammar School but at thirteen went to further his studies in London. There, he trained with the French painter and illustrator, Hubert-Francois Gravelot and associated with the artistic community around the St Martin's Lane Academy, which included William Hogarth (1697–1762) and Francis Hayman (1708–1776). Their decorative Rococo style and introduction of the informal 'conversation piece' as a new portrait type were influential on the young Gainsborough.

In 1749, after his marriage to Margaret Burr and father's death, he returned to his native town of Sudbury. He made a meagre living painting portraits of the local gentry and members of the professional classes. These early portraits were often rather stiff but demonstrated the artist's flair for capturing a likeness and a personality. At the same time, he was also painting landscapes. While clearly inspired by the Suffolk countryside, they were only rarely views of actual places. Gainsborough's early landscapes were imitative of 17th-century Dutch landscape painting, with their careful observation of nature and meticulous technique.

By 1752, Gainsborough had probably exhausted the circle of potential patrons around Sudbury and moved to the larger town of Ipswich, then a flourishing port. There, he had greater opportunities to develop as an artist, with more exacting clients.

In 1759, Gainsborough made a decisive move to Bath. As a rapidly growing spa town in the West Country, Bath became an important social centre for the wealthy and fashionable, where they consulted their doctors or had their portraits painted.

His talents were in demand by more cosmopolitan and aristocratic sitters than before, and his larger studio space enabled him to paint full-lengths on a grand scale. While in Bath, he continued to paint landscape and made sketching excursions in the surrounding countryside. These moved away from the Dutch influence of his earlier landscapes to become imaginary pastoral visions. The growing confidence of Gainsborough as a painter from the 1760s onwards resulted not only from more sophisticated patronage but also his knowledge of the work of other artists. While at Bath, largely for the first time, Gainsborough was able to see paintings by Van Dyck, Rubens and other Old Masters in the great collections at Wilton, Corsham Court or Longford Castle.

In 1768, the Royal Academy was established in London, giving artists an official position in society. Gainsborough was a founder member while his rival, Sir Joshua Reynolds, was its first President. This may have encouraged Gainsborough in his decision to move to the capital in 1774. The artist's relationship with the Academy, however, was not easy and by 1783, he eventually stopped showing at its annual exhibitions.

In London, he resided in the west wing of Schomberg House on Pall Mall, where he held exhibitions at his studio. The portraits of his later years became more fanciful and graceful, often using thin paint applied in light, feathery strokes. The 'Cottage Door' subject was a recurrent theme, while he also developed new, more dramatic landscape subjects, particularly after his tour of the Lake District in 1783. In his last decade, Gainsborough started to broaden his range of subject matter with mythological or 'fancy' pictures. These were of great importance to the artist, who considered The Woodman (destroyed by fire in 1810) to be his finest work. Gainsborough died of cancer on 2 August 1788 and is buried in Kew Churchyard.

== See also ==
- English art
- Hugh Belsey
- List of British painters
- List of single-artist museums
- Western painting
