= Michael Colclough =

British Anglican bishop

The Right Reverend Michael Colclough
- Bishop of Kensington
- Church: Church of England
- Diocese: Diocese of London
- In office: 1996–2008
- Predecessor: vacant
- Successor: Paul Williams
- Other posts: Canon pastor at St Paul's (2008–2013); Acting Dean of St Paul's (2011–2012); Archdeacon of Northolt (1992–1994)

Orders
- Ordination: 1971 (deacon); 1972 (priest)
- Consecration: 24 September 1996

Personal details
- Born: 29 December 1944 (age 81) Staffordshire, England
- Denomination: Anglican
- Education: Leeds University

Michael John Colclough (born 29 December 1944) is a British retired Anglican bishop. He served as area Bishop of Kensington in the Diocese of London (1996–2008) then canon pastor of St Paul's Cathedral, London (2008–2013).

== Early life and education ==
Colclough was born on 29 December 1944 in Staffordshire, England. He was educated at Stanfield Technical High School, a technical school in Burslem, Staffordshire, where he was head boy in 1963. He studied at the University of Leeds, graduating with a Bachelor of Arts (BA) degree in 1969. From 1969 to 1971, he trained for ordination at Cuddesdon College, an Anglo-Catholic theological college in Cuddesdon, Oxfordshire.

== Ordained ministry ==
Colclough was ordained in the Church of England as a deacon in 1971 and as a priest in 1972. His first curacy was adjacent to his old school at St Werburgh's in Burslem, a parish in the Diocese of Lichfield.

He moved to the Diocese of London in 1975, serving a second curacy at St Mary in South Ruislip before becoming Priest-in-Charge of St Anselm in Hayes. He was later appointed Area Dean of Hillingdon (1985–1992) and Team Rector of Uxbridge (1988–1992). Colclough was made Archdeacon of Northolt in 1992.

In 1994, Colclough became archdeacon at London House and personal assistant to the Bishop of London.

From 1994 to 1996 he was priest in charge of St Vedast Foster Lane in the City of London.

In 1995, he became a deputy priest in ordinary to Queen Elizabeth. He was consecrated area Bishop of Kensington on 24 September 1996 at St Paul's Cathedral.

He is vice-president of the Christian Children's Fund of Great Britain - a post he has held since 1998 - and he became patron of the Micro Loan Foundation in 1999.

He has been chairman of the London Diocesan Communications Group, dean of University Chaplains and chairman of the Industrial Mission Team.

As Bishop of Kensington, he was given "special responsibility for Prison Chaplains within the Diocese" and was chairman of the London and Southwark Dioceses Prisons and Penal Concerns Group.

He chairs the Mission, Evangelism and Renewal in England Committee of the Board of Mission and is on the council of the North Thames Ministerial Training Course.

Colclough was appointed a canon residentiary of St Paul's Cathedral in 2008. After more than 11 years, he moved from the Kensington area at the end of January 2009 to the cathedral.

The Bishop of London said: "Michael's ministry in Kensington has left both the Area and the Diocese spiritually enriched and strengthened. I am delighted that he will be remaining in London as a trusted senior colleague, bringing his wide experience to the ministry of St Paul's."

The Dean of St Paul's, Graeme Knowles, said: "We are delighted that Michael Colclough is joining 'the team' here at St Paul's. He brings many gifts and great experience in ministry.". Following the sudden resignation of the dean in 2011, Colclough served as acting dean until 2012, during the later parts of the controversy over the camp by members of the Occupy movement on land partly owned by the cathedral. Colclough retired on 30 September 2013.

Colclough is the bishop in residence and an honorary assistant priest at St Paul's Church, Knightsbridge.

== Styles ==
- The Reverend Michael Colclough (1971–1992)
- The Venerable Michael Colclough (1992–1996)
- The Right Reverend Michael Colclough (1996–present)

Church of England titles
| Preceded by John Hughes | Bishop of Kensington; 1996–2008 | Succeeded by Paul Williams |
