= Roy Southwell =

Roy Southwell (3 December 1914 – 23 July 2011) was the first Archdeacon of Northolt from 1970 to 1980.

Born in Sudbury on 3 December 1914, he was educated at Sudbury Grammar School and King's College London. After curacies in Wigan and Kennington he held incumbencies at Ixworth (1948), Bury St Edmunds (1951) and Bucklesham (1956) before becoming the Diocese of St Edmundsbury and Ipswich’s Director of Education, a post he held from 1959 to 1967. He was Vicar of Hendon from then until his Archdeacon’s appointment.

He died on 23 July 2011. He had married Nancy Sharp and had two daughters.

Church of England titles
Preceded by Inaugural appointment	Archdeacon of Northolt; 1970–1980	Succeeded by Thomas Frederick Butler
