= Catherine Pickford =

British Priest

The Venerable Catherine Pickford
- Archdeacon of Northolt
- Church: Church of England
- Diocese: Diocese of London
- In office: 2020 to present
- Predecessor: Duncan Green

Orders
- Ordination: 2000 (deacon); 2001 (priest)

Personal details
- Born: Catherine Ruth Packer; 5 July 1976 (age 50)
- Denomination: Anglicanism
- Parents: John Packer (father)
- Education: University of Nottingham; Westcott House, Cambridge

Catherine Ruth Pickford (née Packer; born 5 July 1976) is an English Anglican priest. Since September 2020, she has served as Archdeacon of Northolt in the Diocese of London, Church of England. She had previously been in parish ministry in the Diocese of Newcastle since her ordination in 2000, serving as Rector of St James' Church, Benwell (2009–2015) and priest-in-charge of Stannington, Northumberland (2015–2020). Pickford is a member of the General Synod of the Church of England.

== Early life and education ==
Pickford was born on 5 July 1976 in Oxford, Oxfordshire, England. She is the daughter of John Packer, retired Bishop of Ripon and Leeds. She was educated at All Saints Catholic High School, Sheffield, Stainburn School, Workington, and Cockermouth School; all state comprehensive schools. She studied theology at the University of Nottingham, graduating with a Bachelor of Arts (BA) degree in 1997. She then attended Westcott House, Cambridge, a Liberal Anglo-Catholic theological college, to train for Holy Orders. During this time, she also undertook studies for a Master of Arts (MA) degree in pastoral theology at Anglia Polytechnic University. She completed her degree and training for ordination in 2000.

== Ordained ministry ==
Pickford was ordained in the Church of England as a deacon in 2000 and as a priest in 2001. From 2000 to 2004, she served her curacy at All Saints Church, Gosforth in the Diocese of Newcastle. In 2004, she moved to the parish of Benwell as a team vicar based at the Venerable Bede Church. From 2009 to 2015, she was team rector based at St James' Church. In April 2015, she moved to St Mary's Church, Stannington, Northumberland where she had been appointed priest-in-charge and Continuing Ministerial Development Officer for the diocese.

In April 2020, it was announced that Pickford would be the next Archdeacon of Northolt in the Diocese of London. She took up the appointment in September 2020.

== Personal life ==
In 2003, Catherine Ruth Packer married John Pickford. Her husband is a sculptor, and they have three children.
