= Joseph Gape =

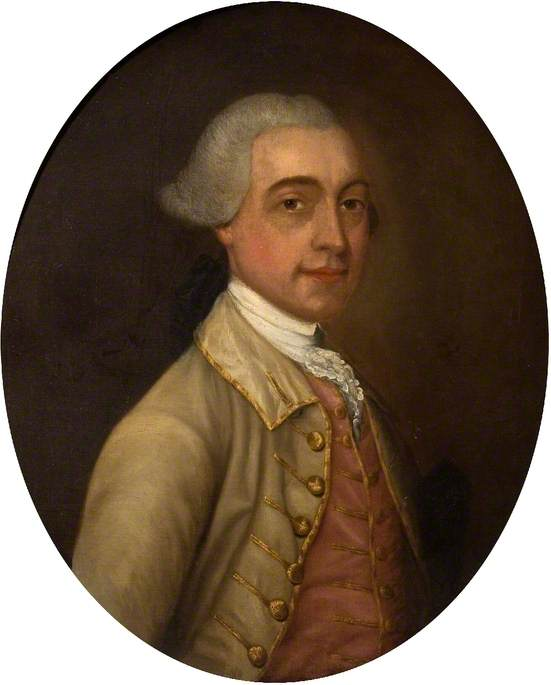
- Portrait of Joseph Gape, Thomas Gainsborough. Oil on canvas, St Albans Museums.
- Born: 1720
- Died: 1801
- Occupation: barrister

Joseph Gape (1720–1801) was an English barrister and three-times mayor of St Albans in Hertfordshire in 1746, 1761 and 1797. He also served on the city council for more than 50 years.

In 2014, a painting of Gape, for which the artist was unknown, was attributed to Thomas Gainsborough by Hugh Belsey on the BBC television series Fake or Fortune?
