= Bishop of Willesden =

Anglican Ecclesiastical title

The Bishop of Willesden is an episcopal title used by a suffragan bishop of the Church of England Diocese of London, in the Province of Canterbury, England. The title takes its name after Willesden, an area of the London Borough of Brent; the See was erected under the Suffragans Nomination Act 1888 by Order in Council dated 8 August 1911.

The post was created in 1911, and was the third suffragan bishopric erected in the diocese since 1879. The new bishop was given oversight of four rural deaneries: Hampstead, Hornsey, St Pancras and Willesden, previously the responsibility of the Bishop of Islington. By November 1911, the Bishop's residence was 13 Cannon Place, Hampstead.

In the experimental area scheme of 1970, the bishop was given oversight of the deaneries of Brent, Harrow, Ealing East and West, and Hillingdon. The bishops suffragan of Willesden have been area bishops since the London area scheme was founded in 1979. The bishop now has responsibility for the Willesden Episcopal Area, that is, the Archdeaconry of Northolt, comprising four deaneries: Brent, Ealing, Harrow and Hillingdon.

== List of bishops ==
Bishops of Willesden
From	Until	Incumbent	Notes
1911	1929	William Perrin	Assistant Bishop of London in retirement
1929	1940	Vernon Smith	Translated to Leicester
1940	1942	Henry Montgomery Campbell	Translated to Kensington
1942	1950	Michael Gresford Jones	Translated to St Albans
1950	1955	Gerald Ellison	Translated to Chester
1955	1964	George Ingle	Formerly Bishop of Fulham
1964	1973	Graham Leonard	Translated to Truro
1974	1985	Hewlett Thompson	First area bishop from 1979; translated to Exeter
1985	1991	Tom Butler	Translated to Leicester
1992	2000	Graham Dow	Translated to Carlisle
2001	2021	Pete Broadbent	Also Acting Bishop of London (2017–2018); resigned See 30 September 2021.
2022	present	Lusa Nsenga-Ngoy	Consecrated 25 January 2022
