= Mr and Mrs Andrews =

Painting by Thomas Gainsborough

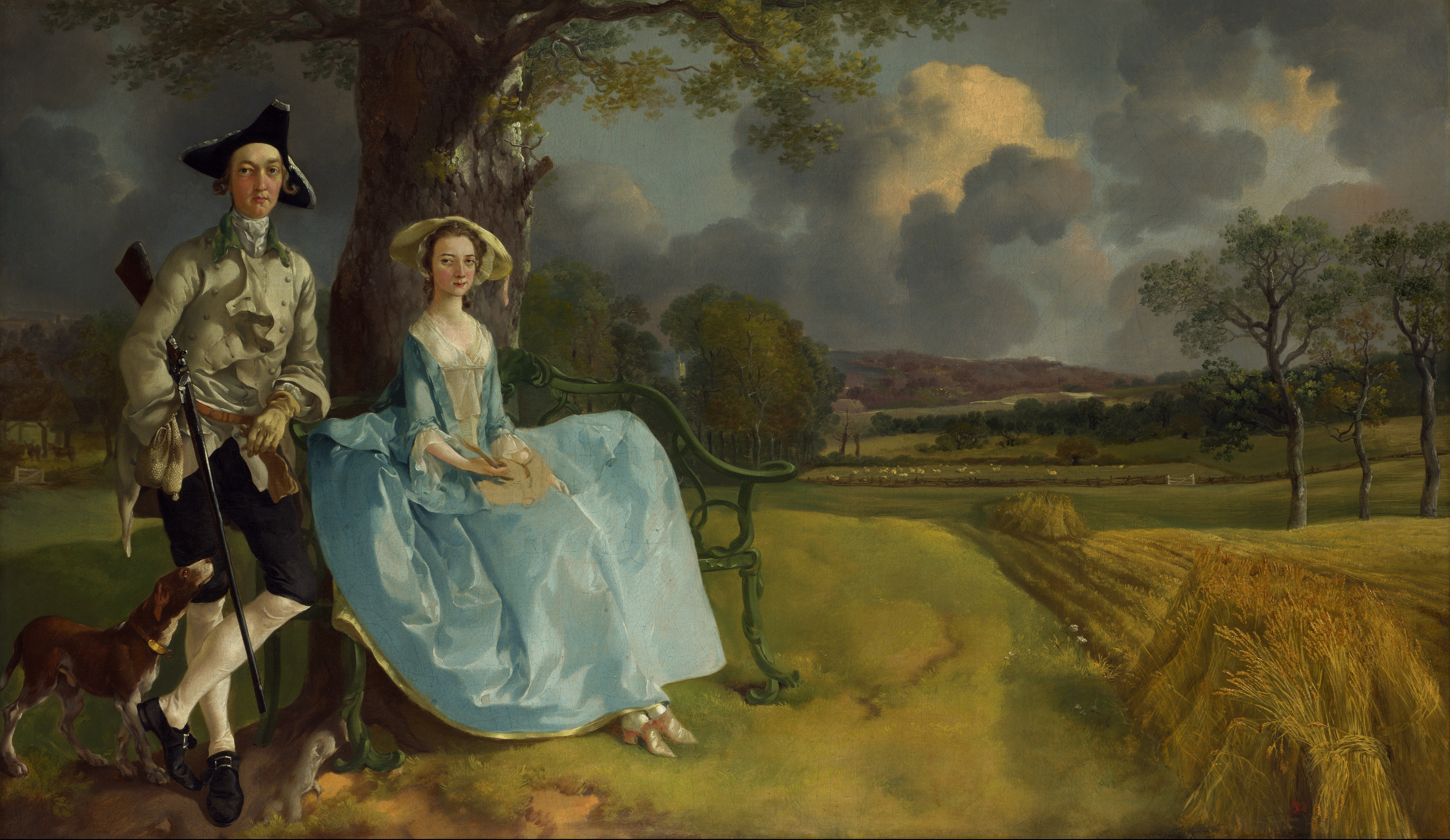
- Artist: Thomas Gainsborough
- Year: c. 1750
- Medium: Oil on canvas
- Dimensions: 69.8 cm × 119.4 cm (27.5 in × 47.0 in)
- Location: National Gallery; London

Mr and Mrs Andrews is an oil on canvas portrait of about 1750 by Thomas Gainsborough, now in the National Gallery, London. Today it is one of his most famous works, but it remained in the family of the sitters until 1960 and was very little known before it appeared in an exhibition in Ipswich in 1927, after which it was regularly requested for other exhibitions in Britain and abroad, and praised by critics for its charm and freshness. By the post-war years its iconic status was established, and it was one of four paintings chosen to represent British art in an exhibition in Paris celebrating the Coronation of Queen Elizabeth II in 1953. Soon the painting began to receive hostile scrutiny as a paradigm of the paternalist and capitalist society of 18th-century England, but it remains a firm popular favourite.

The work is an unusual combination of two common types of painting of the period: a double portrait, here of a recently married couple, Robert and Frances Andrews, as well as a landscape view of the English countryside. Gainsborough's work mainly consisted of these two different genres, but their striking combination side-by-side in this extended horizontal format is unique in Gainsborough's oeuvre, and extremely rare for other painters. Conversation piece was the term for a group portrait that contained other elements and activities, but these normally showed more figures, seen engaged in some activity or in an interior, rather than a landscape empty of people.

Gainsborough was later famously given to complaining that well-paid portrait work kept him away from his true love of landscape painting, and his interest probably combined with that of his clients, a couple from two families whose main income was probably not from landowning, to make – more prominently than was normal in a portrait – a display of the country estate that had formed part of Mrs Andrews' dowry.

== Artist ==
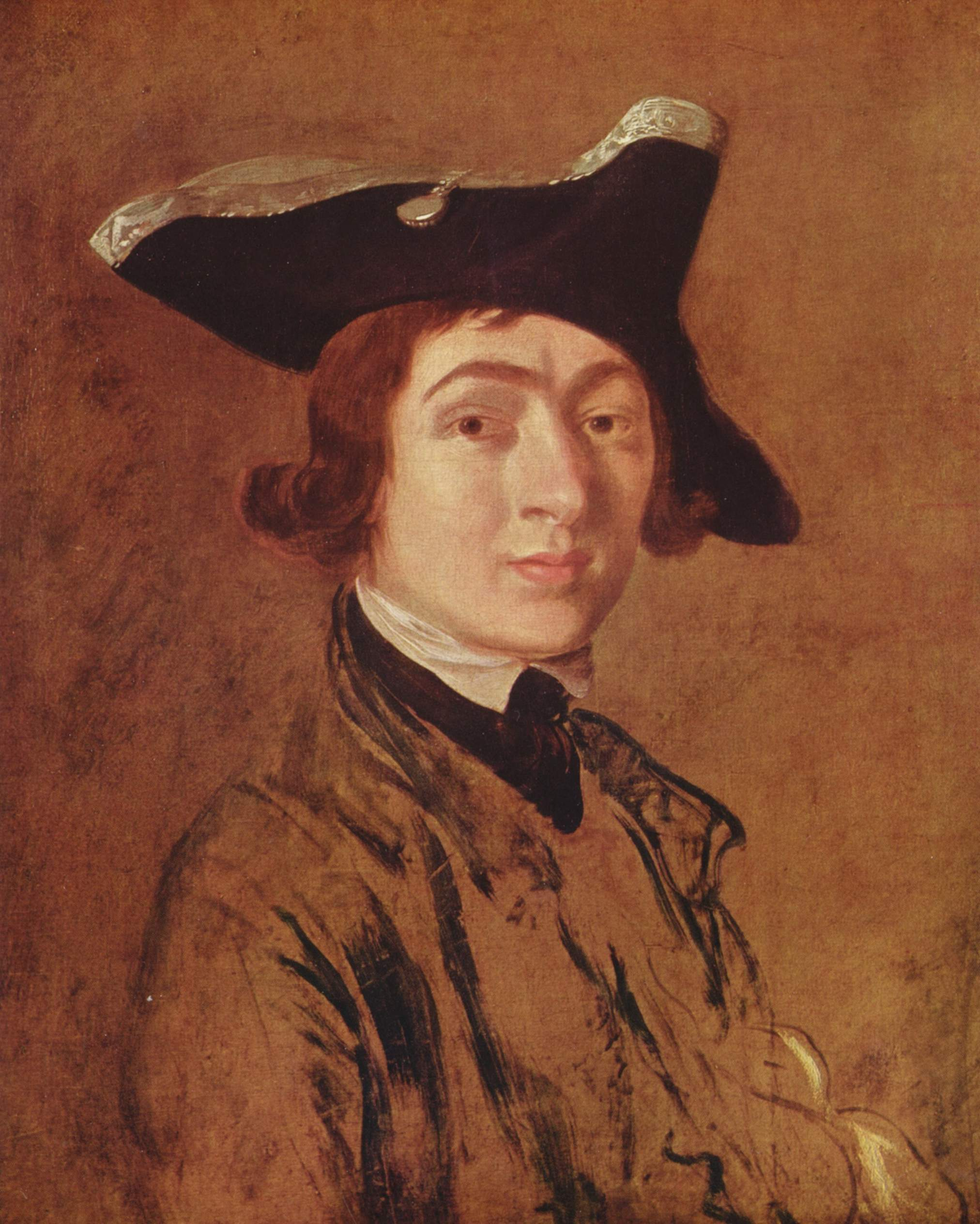
Gainsborough's self-portrait of 1754

Thomas Gainsborough was about twenty-three when he painted Mr and Mrs Andrews in 1750. He had married the pregnant Margaret Burr and returned to Sudbury, Suffolk, his home town as well as that of the Andrews, after an apprenticeship in London with the French artist Hubert-François Gravelot, from whom he learnt the French rococo style. There, he also picked up a love of landscapes in the Dutch style. However, landscape painting was far less prestigious and more poorly paid than portrait work, and Gainsborough was forced (since the family business, a clothiers' in Sudbury, had been bankrupted in 1733) to "face paint" as he put it. Mr and Mrs Andrews contains the widest landscape of Gainsborough's portraits, and he would not return to such compositions. Future paintings would be set against neutral or typical rococo settings. It has been speculated that Gainsborough wished to show off his landscape ability to potential clients, to satisfy his personal preference, or his sitters' wishes.

The relatively small size of the painting, just 2 feet 3 inches (69 cm) high, is typical of both Gainsborough's portraits and landscapes at this early period. Later he painted larger portraits approximating life-size for a grander London clientele than his early depictions of local gentry, and the landscape backgrounds he used were mostly of woods and very generalized. Both his landscape backgrounds to portraits and his pure landscapes tend to show woodland, and the open farmland view seen here is unusual, especially as it begins so close-up to the viewer. Like most pure landscape paintings, Gainsborough's normally showed a view all seen from a certain distance, and that this landscape sweeps away from a foreground very close to the viewer is a feature necessitated by and typical of the portrait, though one that greatly adds to the success of the painting. As with almost all artists of the period, it was not Gainsborough's practice to paint outdoors, and Mrs Andrews did not in reality have to walk in her silk clothes across the fields to pose, one of the aspects of the work commented on disapprovingly by some modern writers.

== Sitters and setting ==
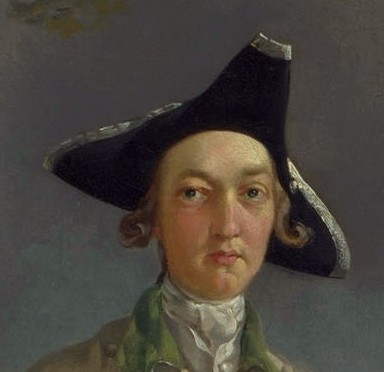
Robert Andrews

Robert Andrews, the male sitter, was a member of the landed gentry, and this is very much apparent in Gainsborough's work. Although it is probable the family money came from being a landlord, Robert's father also lent substantial amounts of money, particularly to other gentry, at significant interest rates. This included the sum of £30,000 to Frederick, Prince of Wales in 1743, for which he became Remembrancer. He had a London house in Grosvenor Square in Mayfair, and also owned ships and engaged in trade with the colonies of the British Empire. Robert himself was born in Bulmer, Essex in 1725, and after attending Sudbury Grammar School at the same time as Gainsborough (two years younger) did, went on to University College, Oxford. His father purchased him an estate, and secured a bride, in a successful attempt to further integrate Robert into the upper classes. In 1763, after his father's death, he would take over the family business. By 1750 he owned almost 3,000 acres, including most of the land visible in the painting.

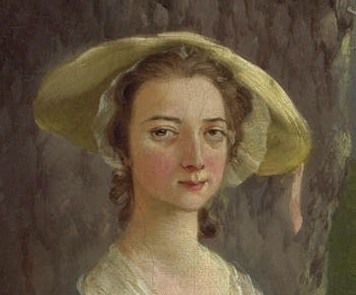
Frances Andrews

His wife sitting beside him is Frances Mary Carter, who was brought up in the same parish of Bulmer, and was "not quite the girl next door, but probably the nearest marriageable girl of his own class". She was betrothed to Andrews at 15 or 16 years old. They were married in Sudbury, on 10 November 1748: he was 22, she 16. Her father also owned businesses as well as property, and had a "share of a house in the City of London" as well as a country base at Ballingdon Hall, just over the River Stour from Sudbury, and so then in Essex. Her family had made their money in the drapery business, and by buying the estate avoided the collapse of the textile industry.

The Andrewses' estate, Auberies, in Bulmer Tye, North Essex, is just some four miles from Sudbury, and bordered Frances' father's Ballingdon estate. It was probably part of her dowry or bought with it, and had been bought between their marriage and when the painting was done. The church glimpsed in the middle of the work is All Saints, Sudbury, where the couple had been married. The small tower in the left background is that of Holy Trinity Church in Long Melford. On the right hand side the barns of the home farm of Frances's childhood home at Ballington Hall can be seen; such an identifiable and accurately depicted location is unusual in Gainsborough's work, and was probably a specific request of the sitters. Their house, also called Auberies, would be in their sight in the portrait, behind the viewer to his right, and much closer than the picture implies. The couple had nine children, and when Frances Andrews died at 48 in 1780, Robert remarried; he died in 1806 at 80.

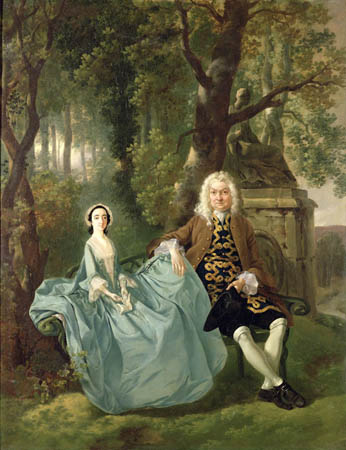
Mrs Andrews' parents, also by Gainsborough: Portrait of Mr and Mrs Carter (c. 1747–1748), 91 x 71 cm

The couple are buried in the churchyard of St. Andrew's Church in Bulmer, whilst a memorial to them hangs in the church itself.

The Andrews wear different dress, but both are more equal in their informality than many observers have thought. Robert is as informal as a man in his position was likely to be seen, even on his own estate, in a loose hunting coat with dangling bags for gunpowder and shot. Frances wears an outfit which in fact is an informal summer suit (as we would now call it) with a separate skirt and jacket, not a dress, of a light blue similar to those that Gainsborough often gave his early female sitters, including her mother, and which may not represent any actual garment of that colour. She wears informal mules and a straw hat. However, their poses are certainly different, with Robert's nonchalant pose not matched by Frances, who is "sitting bolt upright". Apart from considerations of corsetry, and the poise expected of ladies, her figure was probably painted from a dressed artist's mannequin. The rococo bench on which she sits must be made of wood at this date, and it is thought that this was an invention of Gainsborough's, drawing on his period with Gravelot.

Gainsborough had painted (probably in London) Frances's parents in his Mr and Mrs Carter of Bullingdon House, Bulmer, Essex in about 1747–1748 (now Tate Britain). This painting makes an interesting comparison with that of the Andrews in many respects. Frances Jamineau, who became Mrs Carter, was of French parentage, and whether she and her husband were really as disproportionate in size as Gainsborough paints them is unknown.

The neat parallel rows of corn produced by Jethro Tull's revolutionary and controversial seed drill show that this is a thoroughly modern and efficient farm. Robert was a keen farmer, whose letter in 1768 to the agriculturalist Arthur Young "On the Smut in Wheat" was published in Young's Annals of Agriculture. As such details are not typical of Gainsborough's landscapes, but rather anticipate the work of John Constable who was born nearby some 25 years later, it seems likely that they were Robert Andrews's idea. In fact the whole wheat field has been brought far closer to the house than would really have been the case; it is "invented, or transposed from further away. If read literally, the sheaves of corn would be thrusting through the porch of Auberies itself".

The painting has been described as unusual, as an outdoor conversation piece showing the subjects against an agricultural background rather than in the gardens of their own houses, but this is also seen in other early Gainsboroughs. A group portrait of his from about 1754 shows the parents and two daughters of The Gravenor Family (illustrated below) with a square version of a similar composition with two oaks on the left behind the standing father and seated mother, and the daughters to their right, close up to the edge of standing corn. A distant view can be seen above the corn, though Mr Gravenor was a "successful apothecary" in Ipswich, who had just entered local politics, and seems not to have owned either the corn or the view. This is now in the Yale Center for British Art, who also own Gainsborough's Major Dade in Shooting Dress (c. 1755), of another very relaxed Suffolk gentleman shooting on his farmland with two dogs and dead birds.

The oak tree in front of which the Andrews stand has several connotations beyond the choice of location: Englishness, stability and continuity, and a sense of successive generations taking over the family business. The landed gentry had been compared to the oak, holding Britain together. The oak tree still survives, now considerably larger.

== Missing area ==
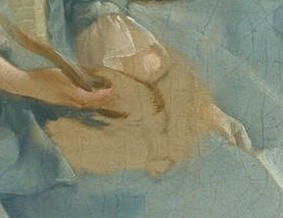
A space reserved for ?

An area on Mrs Andrews' lap is "reserved", that is to say not painted with the blue of her dress. A brown brushstroke has suggested "a long-popular idea" that a cock pheasant was to be placed there, despite the painting probably (from the state of the corn) being set before the legal start of the pheasant season on 1 September. Perhaps more likely is a work bag for embroidery, "tatting or knotting", as is often seen in portraits, a book, a fan, a lapdog, or even a baby yet to be born—their first child was a daughter born in 1751.

== Critical reception ==
After it came to critical attention in 1927, the painting was initially a darling of the critics and art historians. Although Lord Duveen was still achieving huge prices for the later Grand Manner portraits he was selling to American plutocrats, critical taste was increasingly appreciative of Gainsborough's smaller and fresher early portraits. For Sir John Rothenstein in 1947 "there are few interpretations of civilized man in his relations with cultivated nature more lovely or psychologically profound", and other writers have developed the analysis of themes of fertility, abundance and interest in nature in the work. It was praised by Kenneth Clark in Landscape into Art (1949): "this enchanting work is painted with such love and mastery ...", which was in turn quoted scornfully by the Marxist art critic John Berger in his Ways of Seeing (1972) who went on to comment that Mr and Mrs Andrews are "not a couple in nature as Rousseau imagined nature. They are landowners and their proprietary attitude towards what surrounds them is visible in their stance and expressions."

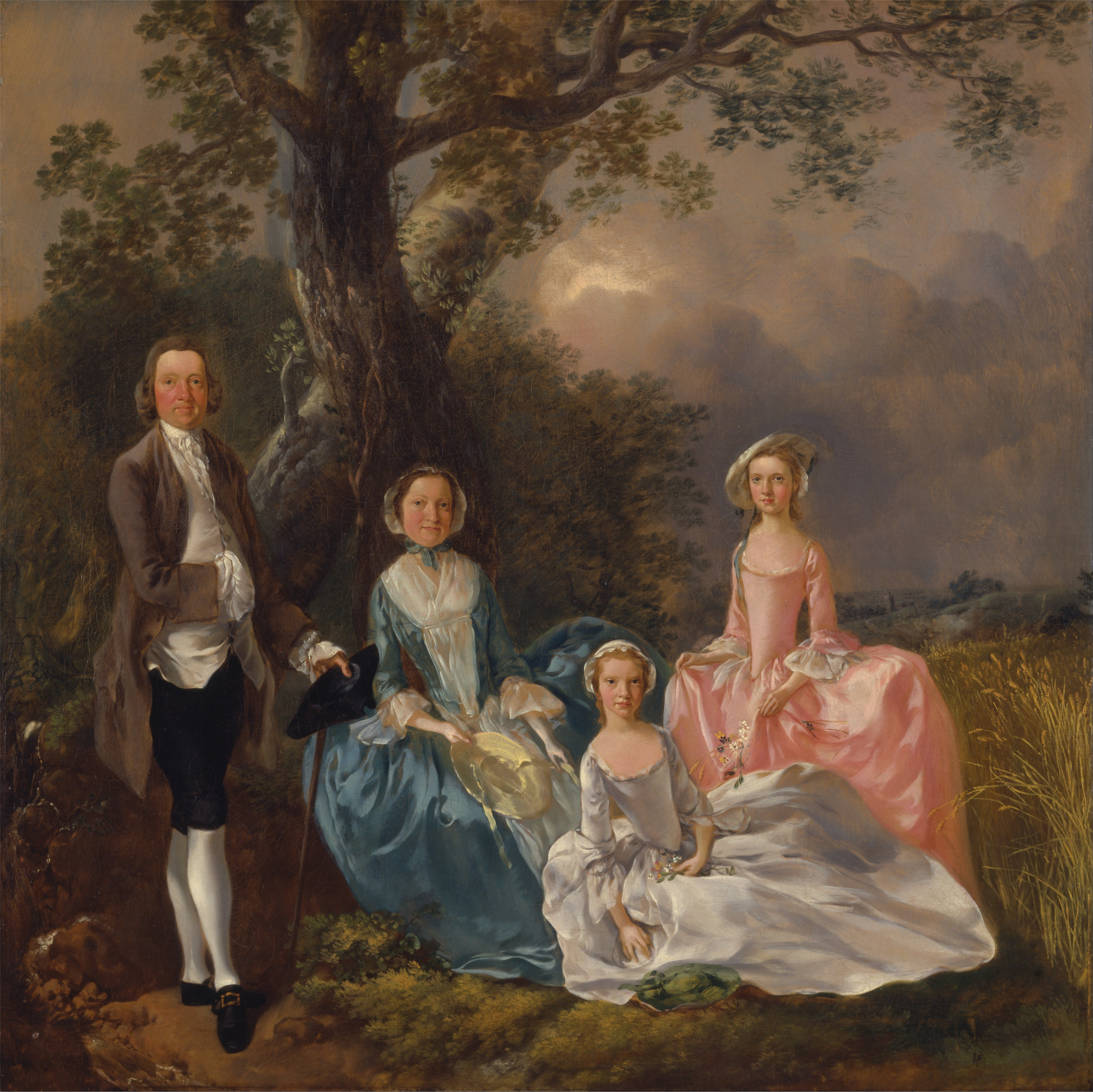
Gainsborough's The Gravenor Family (c. 1755); Mr Gravenor was an apothecary rather than a squire

Berger's brief remarks began a tradition of essentially hostile commentary in books on human geography and other parts of the humanities, that tend to treat normal features of historic portraiture as somewhat sinister, in a view emphasizing negative aspects of the English 18th century. By 2004 it was described as "a painting that has become so widely cited by human geographers that we feel it has become the one cultural artefact no self-respecting commentary on the practice of human geography can afford to ignore". According to another geographer: "Mr and Mrs Andrews, then, is an image on which geographers are agreed: it is a symptom of the capitalist property relations that legitimize and are sanctioned by the visual sweep of a landscape prospect".

In this tradition, the expensive medium of oil-on-canvas itself and the lack of farm-workers in the image are cited as further evidence, and Mrs Andrews' somewhat stiff seated position is said to express her inferior and passive status, as she is placed on display like other assets of her husband. Harsh things are said about the appearance and facial expressions of the two sitters, their dress and poses, and Mr Andrews carrying a gun. To some authors in this tradition, Gainsborough's intention in making the portrait was in part satirical, something most art historians are unlikely to agree with.

In contrast, Andrew Graham-Dixon finds the painting "in its quiet, understated way, one of the masterpieces of erotic painting"; Robert's "clothes are almost falling off him, they are so loose and floppy" while Frances "has a melted, langourous look about her". For Erica Langmuir it is "the most tartly lyrical picture in the history of art. Mr Andrew's satisfaction in his well-kept farmlands is as nothing to the intensity of the painter's feeling for the gold and green of fields and copses, the supple curves of fertile land meeting the stately clouds". She notes the visual "rhymes and assonances" that link elements of the composition: the skirt with the bench's back, Mrs Andrews' shoes with its feet and Mr Andrews' with the tree roots, and "the lines of gun, thighs, dog, calf, coat". His hanging coat tail relates to the ribbon hanging from his wife's hat.

== History ==
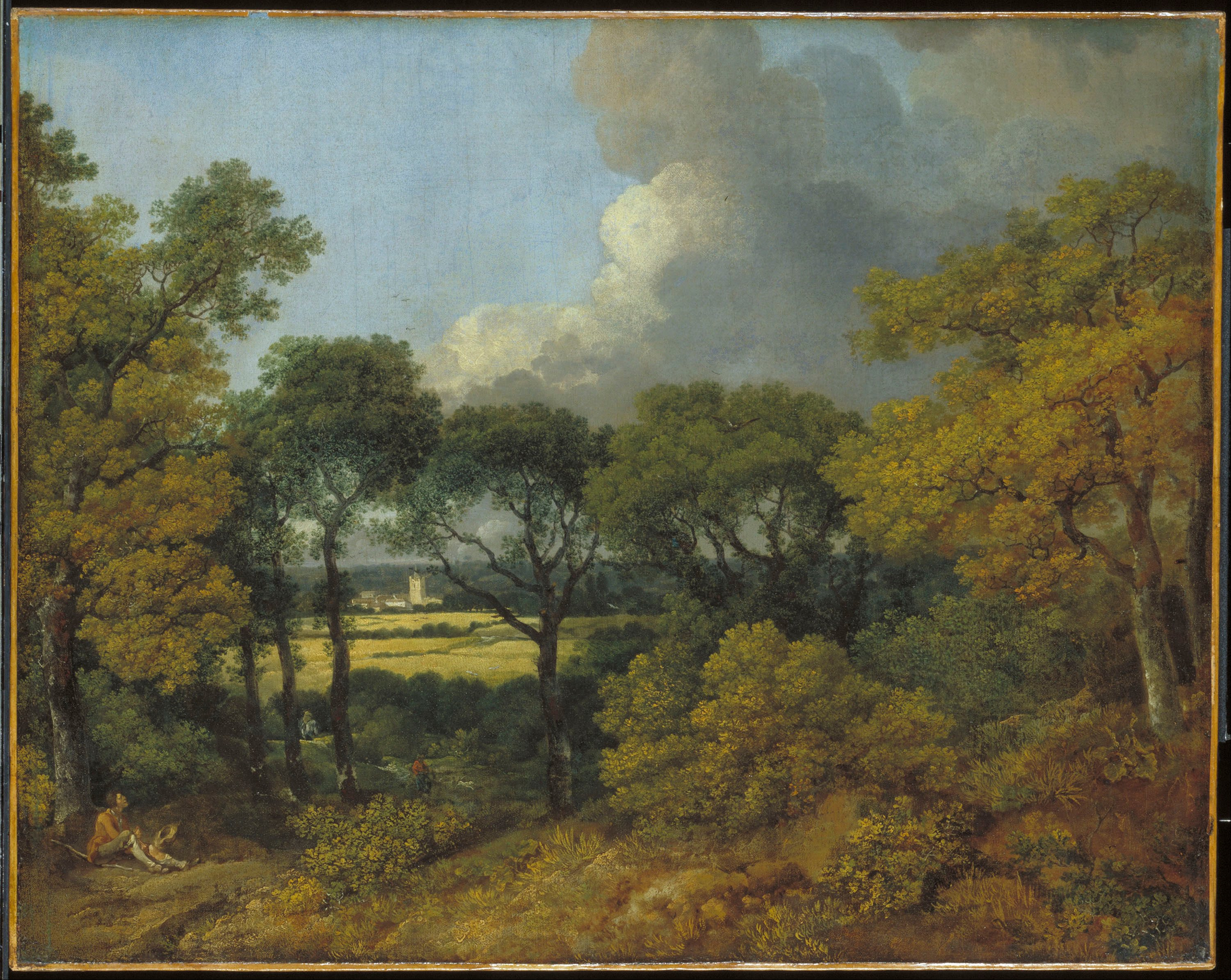
Wooded Landscape with a Peasant Resting, 1747, typical of Gainsborough's early pure landscapes

After effectively being rediscovered in the 1927 Ipswich exhibition celebrating the bicentenary of Gainsborough's birth, the painting was exhibited in Brussels in 1929, London in 1930, London and Manchester in 1934, Amsterdam in 1936, London in 1937, and at the Louvre in Paris in 1938. After the Second World War it was seen in Norwich in 1948, toured for the British Council in 1949–50, was in London at the Festival of Britain in 1951, Paris and London in 1953, Fort Worth, Texas, in 1954, Rotterdam and Brussels in 1955, and Sudbury in 1958 to support an appeal to buy Gainsborough's house. When owned by the National Gallery it was lent to Expo 67 in Montreal in 1967, Paris in 1981, the Prado in Madrid in 1988–89, the National Portrait Gallery, London in 1991–2, and toured Norwich and Newcastle upon Tyne in 1997.

The painting remained with the family until sold by Gerald Willoughbury Andrews (b. 1896, a great-great-great-grandson of the sitters) at Sotheby's in London on 23 March 1960. It was bought for £130,000 by the dealers Thomas Agnew & Sons, apparently as agents for the National Gallery, to whom it soon belonged. It was purchased with a "Special Grant from the Exchequer" and contributions from the Pilgrim Trust, The Art Fund, Associated Television Ltd, and Mr and Mrs W. W. Spooner. This was still below the $621,000 paid in 1921 by Henry Huntington to Joseph Duveen (about £148,000 at the time) for The Blue Boy, and seemed "cheap" to Gerald Reitlinger, writing in 1970, before art prices began to escalate to their present levels.

The painting is in good condition, and entirely finished apart from the reserved area discussed above.

== See also ==
- 100 Great Paintings, 1980 BBC series
