= George Iype Kovoor =

George Iype Kovoor (born 1957) is an Anglican clergyman. He has been Rector of St Paul's Episcopal Church in Darien, Connecticut since 2016.

Kovoor is from Tiruvalla, India, and studied at Delhi University. He was ordained in the Church of North India and emigrated to the United Kingdom in 1990. He served as Mission Education Director for the Church Mission Society, president of Crowther Hall from 1995 to 2005, and Principal of Trinity College, Bristol from 2005 to 2013. He was also Canon of Worcester Cathedral and Honorary Chaplain to the Queen. In 2013, Kovoor moved to the United States and became a fellow of Berkeley College, Yale University.

In 2017, members of the vestry of St Paul's attempted to remove Kovoor as rector, and initiated a lawsuit against Bishop Ian Douglas, who supported Kovoor. In 2020, the two sides reached a settlement, and Kovoor remained the rector.
