= Archdeacon of Northolt =

Church of England regional post

The Archdeacon of Northolt is a senior ecclesiastical officer within the Diocese of London. As such, they are responsible for the disciplinary supervision of the clergy within its four area deaneries: Brent, Hillingdon, Ealing and Harrow.

The post was inaugurated in 1970 and is currently held by Catherine Pickford.

== List of archdeacons ==
- 1970–1980 (ret.): Roy Southwell (first archdeacon; afterward archdeacon emeritus)
- 1980–1985 (res.): Tom Butler
- 1985–1992 (res.): Eddie Shirras
- 1992–1994 (res.): Michael Colclough
- 1995–2001 (res.): Pete Broadbent
- 2001–2005 (res.): Christopher Chessun
- 2006–2011 (res.): Rachel Treweek
- 2011 – 1 April 2013: post vacant – acting archdeacon: the area Bishop of Willesden (Pete Broadbent)
- 1 April 2013 – 30 November 2019 (ret.): Duncan Green
- September 2020 onwards: Catherine Pickford
