= Bishop of Kensington =

Episcopal title

The Bishop of Kensington is an episcopal title used by an area bishop of the Church of England Diocese of London, in the Province of Canterbury, England. The Bishop of Kensington is responsible for a part of Greater London, including Kensington, Hounslow, Hampton, Hammersmith and Fulham, plus the Spelthorne district in Surrey.

In February 1903, the first bishop received care of the rural deaneries of Westminster, Hampton, and Uxbridge from assistant bishop Alfred Barry, who had in turn taken over responsibility for "West London" from the Bishop of Marlborough in 1900. In 1906, Ridgeway moved to a house on Cornwall Gardens, South Kensington. In the experimental area scheme of 1970, the bishop was given oversight of the deaneries of Kensington, Chelsea, Hammersmith, Hampton, Staines and Hounslow. The bishops suffragan of Kensington have been area bishops since the London area scheme was founded in 1979.

Emma Ineson became Bishop of Kensington upon swearing the oaths at a service on 19 February 2023.

== List of bishops ==
Bishops of Kensington
From	Until	Incumbent	Notes
1901	1911	Frederick Ridgeway	(1875–1921). Translated to Salisbury
1911	1932	John Maud	(1860–1932). Died in post.
1932	1942	Bertram Simpson	(1883–1971). Translated to Southwark
1942	1949	Henry Montgomery Campbell	(1887–1970). Formerly Bishop of Willesden. Translated to Guildford
1949	1961	Cyril Easthaugh	(1897–1988). Translated to Peterborough
1962	1964	Edward Roberts	(1908–2001). Formerly Bishop of Malmesbury. Translated to Ely
1964	1980	Ronald Goodchild	(1910–1998) First area bishop from 1979.
1981	1987	Mark Santer	(born 1936). Translated to Birmingham
1987	1994	John Hughes	(1935–1994) Died in office 19 August 1994.
1994	1996	no appointment	
1996	2008	Michael Colclough	(born 1944). Moved to become Canon Residentiary and Canon Pastor at St Paul's Cathedral
2009	2015	Paul Williams	Translated to Southwell & Nottingham 11 May 2015.
23 September 2015	2022	Graham Tomlin	Consecrated 23 September 2015; resigned 30 August 2022.
2023	present	Emma Ineson	Previously Bishop of Penrith and Bishop to the Archbishops of Canterbury and York;
