= Diocese of London =

Diocese of the Church of England

Coordinates: 51.5138°N 0.0986°W

Diocese of London Dioecesis Londiniensis
- Coat of arms

- Flag

Location
- Ecclesiastical province: Canterbury
- Archdeaconries: London; Middlesex; Hampstead; Hackney; Northolt; Charing Cross

Statistics
- Area: 460 km^{2} (180 sq mi)
- Parishes: 403
- Churches: 475

Information
- Established: 4th Century
- Cathedral: St Paul's
- Co-cathedral: Westminster Abbey (1550–1556 only)
- Patron saint: Saint Paul
- Language: English

Current leadership
- Bishop: Vacant
- Suffragans: Jonathan Baker, Bishop of Fulham; Emma Ineson, area Bishop of Kensington; Lusa Nsenga-Ngoy, area Bishop of Willesden; Anderson Jeremiah, area Bishop of Edmonton; Rod Green, area Bishop of Stepney; Bishop of Islington (vacant)
- Archdeacons: Luke Miller, Archdeacon of London; John Hawkins, Archdeacon of Hampstead; Richard Frank, Archdeacon of Middlesex; Catherine Pickford, Archdeacon of Northolt; Peter Farley-Moore, Archdeacon of Hackney; Katherine Hedderly, Archdeacon of Charing Cross

Map
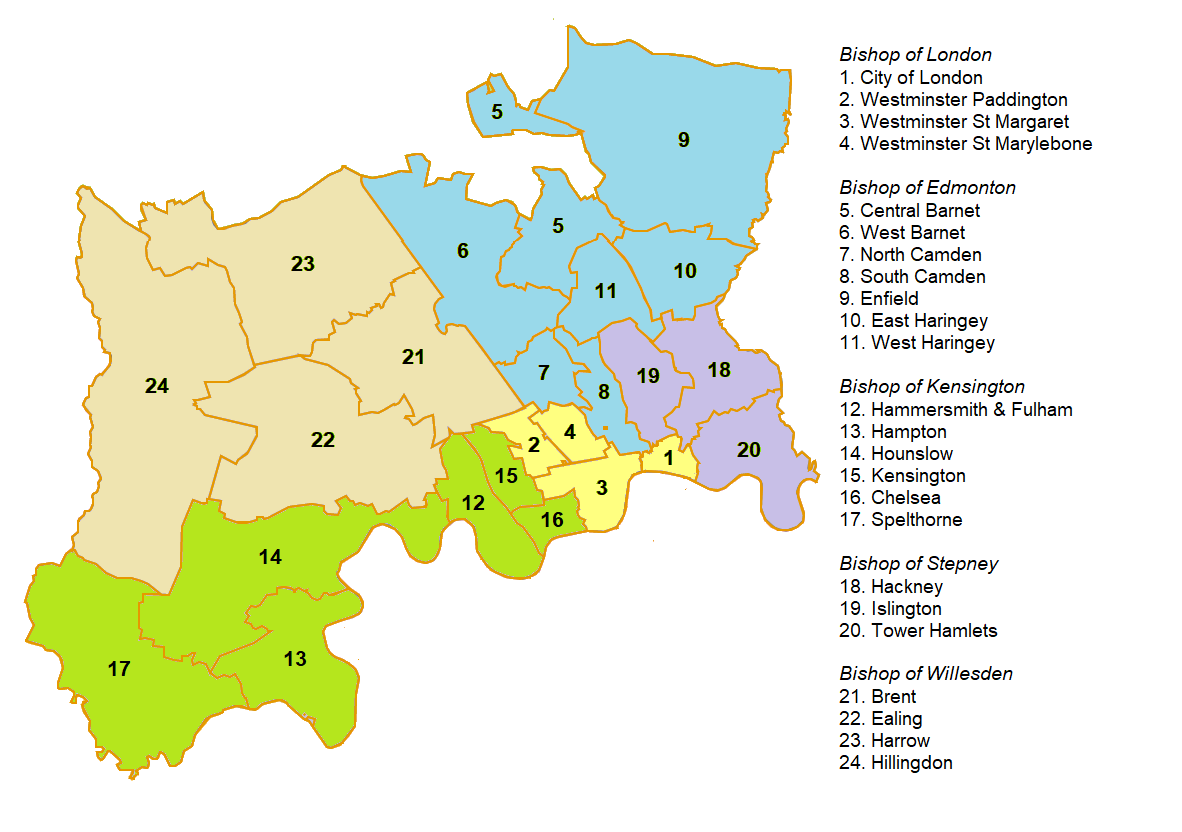

Website
- london.anglican.org

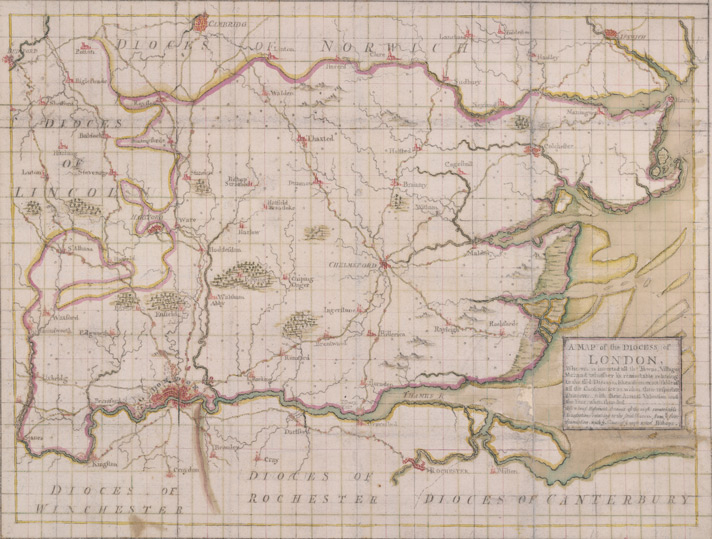
Map of the Diocese of London in 1714. The current diocesan boundaries are greatly reduced. A large western tract and narrow eastern tract of Hertfordshire lay in this diocese, the rest in the Diocese of Lincoln; the whole county is in the Diocese of Saint Albans today.

The Diocese of London forms part of the Church of England's Province of Canterbury in England.

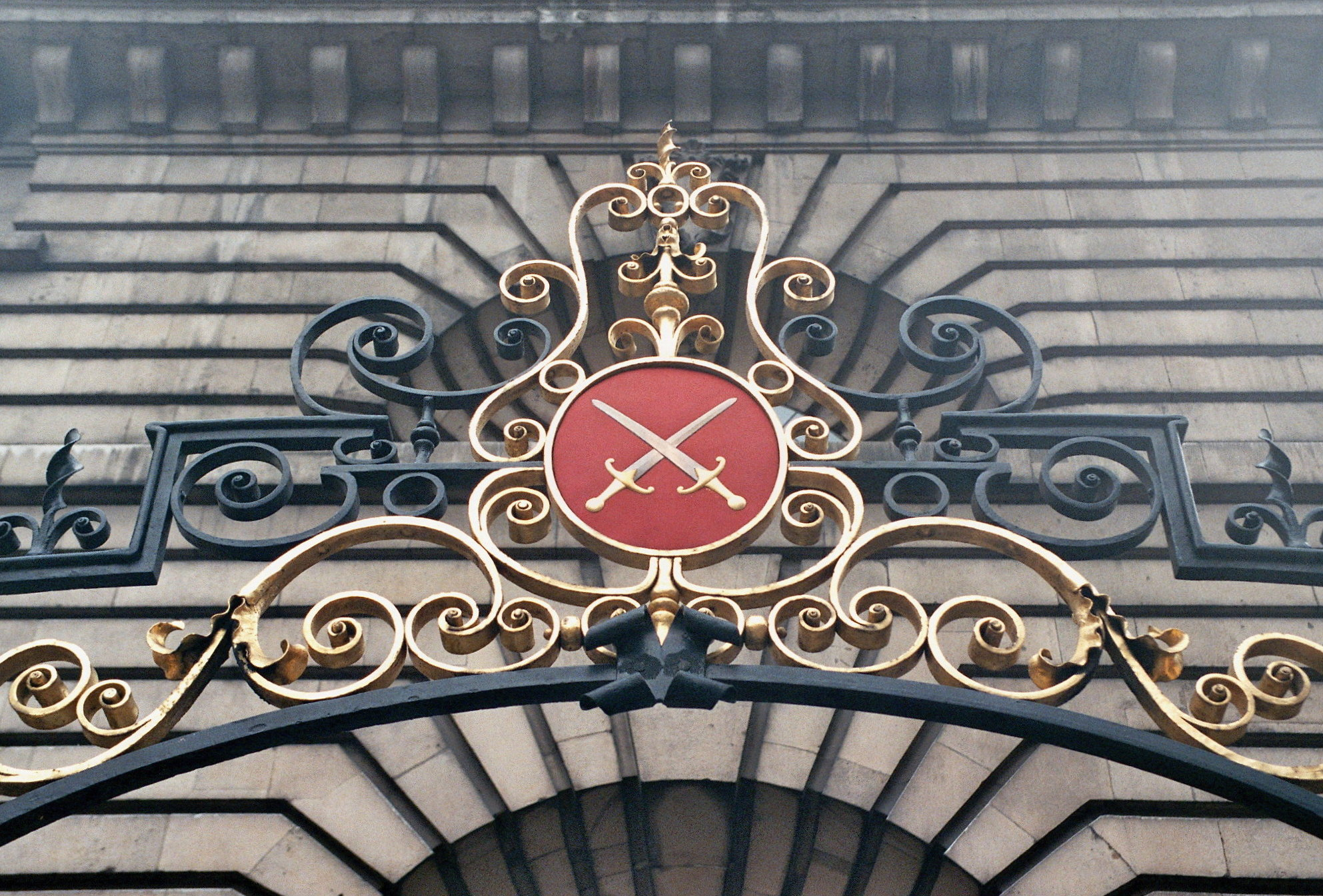
Arms of the Diocese of London at the gate of St Mary Woolnoth in the City

It lies directly north of the Thames, covering 177 square miles (460 km^{2}) and all or part of 17 London boroughs. This corresponds almost exactly to the historic county of Middlesex. It includes the City of London in which lies its cathedral, St Paul's, and also encompasses Spelthorne which is currently administered by Surrey. It encompasses most of that part of Greater London which lies north of the River Thames and west of the River Lea.

The diocese covered all of Essex until 1846 when Essex became part of the Diocese of Rochester, after which St Albans and since 1914 forms the Diocese of Chelmsford. It also formerly took in southern and eastern parts of Hertfordshire.

The Report of the Commissioners appointed by his Majesty to inquire into the Ecclesiastical Revenues of England and Wales (1835), noted the annual net income for the London see was £13,929. This made it the third wealthiest diocese in England after Canterbury and Durham.

== Organisation ==
Following the huge growth of the metropolis and its population in the 19th century, successive Bishops of London successfully campaigned for the appointment of several suffragan bishops to assist them in the care of the northern half of what became the County of London and later Greater London. A system of assigning "districts" to these suffragans evolved into an experimental area scheme in 1970. An archbishop's commission on the diocesan arrangements in Greater London was established in 1975 and chaired by Edmund Compton; its report considered but did not recommend forming all Greater London into an ecclesiastical province.

Since the formal institution of the London area scheme (the first of its kind) in 1979, the diocese has been divided into five episcopal areas, each of which is the particular responsibility of one of the diocese's suffragan bishops, except for the Two Cities area which is under the direct oversight of the diocesan bishop. It is further divided into archdeaconries and deaneries, as shown below.

Episcopal area	Archdeaconry	Deaneries
Two Cities Episcopal Area (Bishop of London)	Archdeaconry of London	Deanery of the City of London
Two Cities Episcopal Area (Bishop of London)	Archdeaconry of Charing Cross	Deanery of Westminster Paddington
Two Cities Episcopal Area (Bishop of London)	Archdeaconry of Charing Cross	Deanery of Westminster St Margaret
Two Cities Episcopal Area (Bishop of London)	Archdeaconry of Charing Cross	Deanery of Westminster St Marylebone
Edmonton Episcopal Area (area Bishop of Edmonton)	Archdeaconry of Hampstead	Deanery of Central Barnet
Edmonton Episcopal Area (area Bishop of Edmonton)	Archdeaconry of Hampstead	Deanery of West Barnet
Edmonton Episcopal Area (area Bishop of Edmonton)	Archdeaconry of Hampstead	Deanery of North Camden (Hampstead)
Edmonton Episcopal Area (area Bishop of Edmonton)	Archdeaconry of Hampstead	Deanery of South Camden (St Pancras and Holborn)
Edmonton Episcopal Area (area Bishop of Edmonton)	Archdeaconry of Hampstead	Deanery of Enfield
Edmonton Episcopal Area (area Bishop of Edmonton)	Archdeaconry of Hampstead	Deanery of East Haringey
Edmonton Episcopal Area (area Bishop of Edmonton)	Archdeaconry of Hampstead	Deanery of West Haringey
Kensington Episcopal Area (area Bishop of Kensington)	Archdeaconry of Middlesex	Deanery of Hammersmith and Fulham
Kensington Episcopal Area (area Bishop of Kensington)	Archdeaconry of Middlesex	Deanery of Hampton
Kensington Episcopal Area (area Bishop of Kensington)	Archdeaconry of Middlesex	Deanery of Hounslow
Kensington Episcopal Area (area Bishop of Kensington)	Archdeaconry of Middlesex	Deanery of Kensington
Kensington Episcopal Area (area Bishop of Kensington)	Archdeaconry of Middlesex	Deanery of Chelsea
Kensington Episcopal Area (area Bishop of Kensington)	Archdeaconry of Middlesex	Deanery of Spelthorne
Stepney Episcopal Area (area Bishop of Stepney)	Archdeaconry of Hackney	Deanery of Hackney
Stepney Episcopal Area (area Bishop of Stepney)	Archdeaconry of Hackney	Deanery of Islington
Stepney Episcopal Area (area Bishop of Stepney)	Archdeaconry of Hackney	Deanery of Tower Hamlets
Willesden Episcopal Area (area Bishop of Willesden)	Archdeaconry of Northolt	Deanery of Brent
Willesden Episcopal Area (area Bishop of Willesden)	Archdeaconry of Northolt	Deanery of Ealing
Willesden Episcopal Area (area Bishop of Willesden)	Archdeaconry of Northolt	Deanery of Harrow
Willesden Episcopal Area (area Bishop of Willesden)	Archdeaconry of Northolt	Deanery of Hillingdon

=== Bishops ===
Under the London area scheme the diocesan bishop, the Bishop of London retains oversight of the two cities of London and Westminster while the four area bishops have responsibility in their own episcopal areas. The suffragan see of Stepney was created in 1895, Kensington in 1901, Willesden in 1911 and Edmonton in 1970. The suffragan see of Marlborough existed from 1888 to 1918. On 1 May 2015, it was announced that Richard Chartres' (then-Bishop of London) proposal to take the See of Islington out of abeyance for the appointment of a "bishop for church plants" would go ahead. Ric Thorpe was consecrated bishop suffragan of Islington on 29 September 2015; he vacated the See on 30 November 2025, upon his translation as Anglican Archbishop of Melbourne.

Alternative episcopal oversight (for parishes in the diocese which do not accept the ordination of women as priests) is provided by a fifth suffragan bishop, Jonathan Baker, Bishop of Fulham, who has the same ministry in the Southwark and Rochester dioceses. During a lengthy vacancy in that see, alternative episcopal oversight was offered by the then-area Bishop of Edmonton.

There are also several retired bishops living in the diocese, some of whom are licensed as honorary assistant bishops:

- 1984–present: Michael Marshall, former suffragan Bishop of Woolwich, lives in Chelsea and is also licensed as an honorary assistant bishop in Chichester diocese.
- 2002–present: Edward Holland, retired Bishop of Colchester, lives in Hammersmith and is also licensed in the Diocese in Europe.
- 2003–present: Walter Makhulu, Archbishop emeritus of Central Africa and retired Bishop of Botswana, lives in Putney.
- 2006–present: Sandy Millar, a former vicar of Holy Trinity Brompton, lives in Aldeburgh, Suffolk and is also an honorary assistant bishop in the Diocese of St Edmundsbury and Ipswich.
- 2009–present: Robert Ladds, former Bishop suffragan of Whitby, lives in Hendon.
- 2013–present: Michael Colclough, retired canon pastor of St Paul's Cathedral and former bishop of Kensington, lives in Chelsea. He is also licensed in the diocese in Europe.
- July 2014 – present: Stephen Platten, former rector of St Michael Cornhill and retired bishop of Wakefield (also in Southwark and Newcastle dioceses.)

== Schools ==
The London Diocesan Board for Schools (LDBS) has responsibility for 155 Church of England schools within the London diocese, across 18 local authorities.

== Fraud ==
In December 2022, Martin Sargeant, formerly Head of Operations in the Two Cities, was sentenced at Southwark Crown Court to five years in prison for defrauding the London Diocese of £5.2m. He had built up close contacts within the Church of England. Around January 2002, he was renting a flat at St George in the East Church, London, when Gillean Craig was Rector.

== See also ==
- List of churches in the City of London
- List of churches in the City of Westminster
- List of churches in the Diocese of London
- Roman Catholic Archdiocese of Westminster
