= Babbs =

Babbs may refer to:

- Babbs, Oklahoma (Babbs Switch), small rural community in Kiowa County, Oklahoma
  - Babbs Switch Fire on December 24, 1924, killed thirty-six people in a one-room school house at Babbs Switch
- Babbs Green, village in Hertfordshire, England
- Babbs Island, island in Hancock County, West Virginia on the Ohio River between East Liverpool, Ohio and Chester, West Virginia
- Babbs Mill Lake, man-made lake in the Kingfisher Country Park in the Kingshurst area of Solihull, England
- Babbs (surname)

== See also ==
- Babb
- Babs (disambiguation)
