= Shard End =

Electoral ward of Birmingham City Council in England

Coordinates: 52.4963°N 1.7752°W

- Neighbourhood
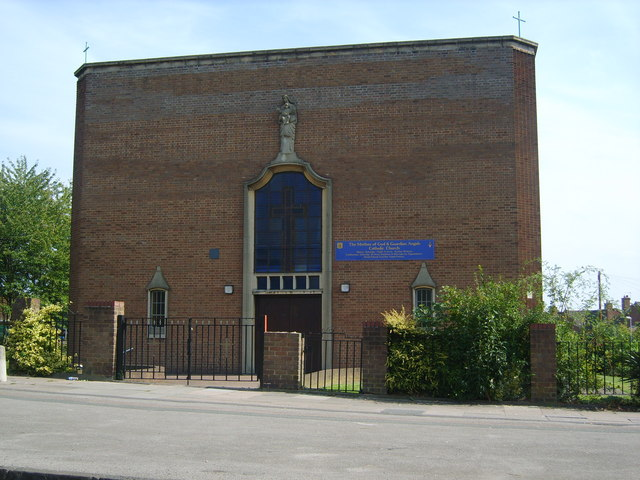
- The Mother of God and Guardian Angels Catholic Church on Freasley Road in 2006

- Location within the West Midlands
- Population: 7,423 (2021)
  - Density: 41.1 per ha
- OS grid reference: SP157889
- Metropolitan borough: Birmingham
- Metropolitan county: West Midlands
- Region: West Midlands
- Country: England
- Sovereign state: United Kingdom
- Post town: Birmingham
- Postcode district: B34
- Dialling code: 0121
- Police: West Midlands
- Fire: West Midlands
- Ambulance: West Midlands
- UK Parliament: Birmingham Hodge Hill and Solihull North

Shard End is an area in east Birmingham, in the county of the West Midlands, England. It is part of a wider eponymous ward within the formal district of Hodge Hill. Shard End borders Castle Bromwich to the north and Kingshurst to the east, which are both situated in the northwestern part of the neighbouring Metropolitan Borough of Solihull. The neighbourhood had a population of 7,423 at the 2021 census. Before 1974, Shard End was in Northwestern Warwickshire, close to the border with Worcestershire; it was also part of Birmingham for some years before the county change.

== History ==
=== Pre-war ===
Before the end of World War II, Shard End was a completely rural area of northwestern Warwickshire; the only buildings were farmhouses, farm outbuildings and tithe cottages.

Shard End's most infamous resident was Abraham Thornton, son of the owner of Shard End Farm (then part of the Coleshill estate). He was charged with the murder of a local girl, Mary Ashford, in 1817. The events of the trial led to the abolition of two ancient legal rights – the right of a close relative to demand another trial although the defendant had been acquitted, and the right of a defendant to defend himself by challenging the relative to a duel. The duel did not take place and Thornton left the area soon after his second trial to travel to the US.

During World War I, much of the woodland between Shard End and Kingshurst had been cut down to help with the war effort. The Birmingham and District Association of Boy Scouts were able to buy a patch of land at a bargain price and set up a permanent camp there. This land was halfway between Kingshurst and Shard End. It was called Yorkswood and opened in 1923. There were five camp fields, covering an area of 25 acres (10 ha). The total site was over 200 acres (81 ha). The site benefited from permanent washhouses and latrines, a swimming pool, a training centre and headquarters, guesthouse, warden's hut and other huts. A small brook from a fresh water spring ran past the camp and Cock Sparrow Farm was about 100 yards (91 m) away to provide fresh milk. The entrance to the camp was flanked by a series of griffin statues. These had come from the roof of Lewis's Department Store in Birmingham when it was being renovated. After the camp closed in 1972 they were placed upon the Yorkswood housing estate (Kendrick Avenue and nearby roads) in Shard End, built upon the site of the camp. Yorkswood takes its name from the nearby Yorks Wood, an eleven hectare forest dating back hundreds of years.

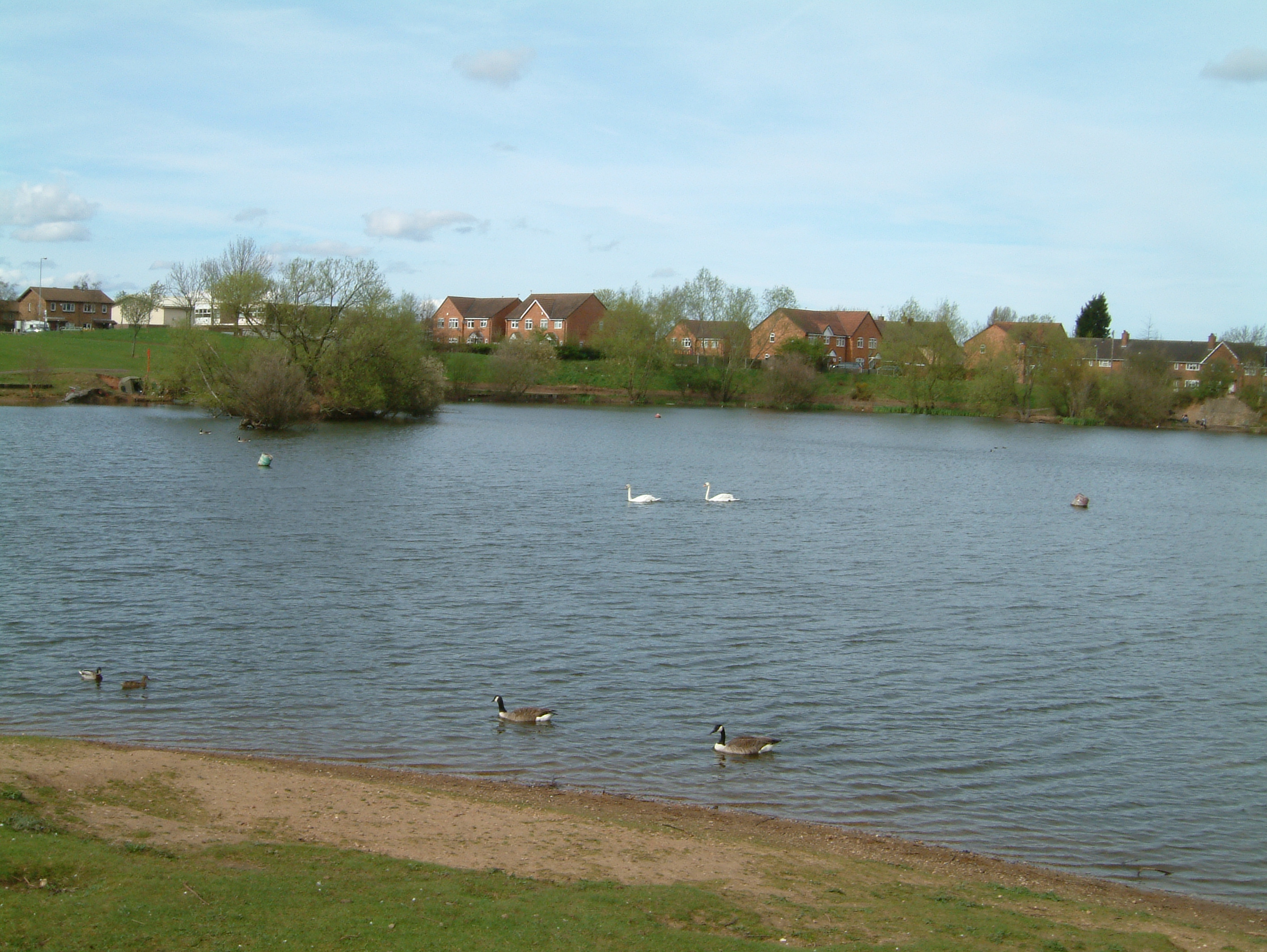
Shard End Lake

In the inter war years the Midland Sand and Gravel Company operated a mine on what is now the Norman Chamberlain Playing Fields, off Packington Avenue. During World War II, this gravel pit was used to store and repair third-line tanks. After the war the area was landscaped to become the playing fields. The old gravel pit was allowed to fill with water from a natural spring to form Shard End Lake and has become a leisure facility.

=== The new estate ===
A plan of the new housing estate was produced at the end of 1945 and compulsory purchase orders were issued in 1946. Building of the estate started in the late 1940s and was added to in stages producing some variety in the housing. As usual, communal facilities lagged behind the building of the housing. Nine tower blocks were constructed in the ward.

As a result of the construction of the estate, plans for a new church were drawn up. In 1954, construction of All Saints Church, a traditional Church of England church, began and construction was completed in 1955. Designed by F J Osbourne, it was the first new church to be built in Birmingham after World War II. On 1 November 1955, the Lord Bishop of Birmingham, Leonard Wilson, consecrated the church. This was followed by a visit by Queen Elizabeth II two days later. Nikolaus Pevsner, an architect and writer, disapproved of the building calling it "a very ugly church".

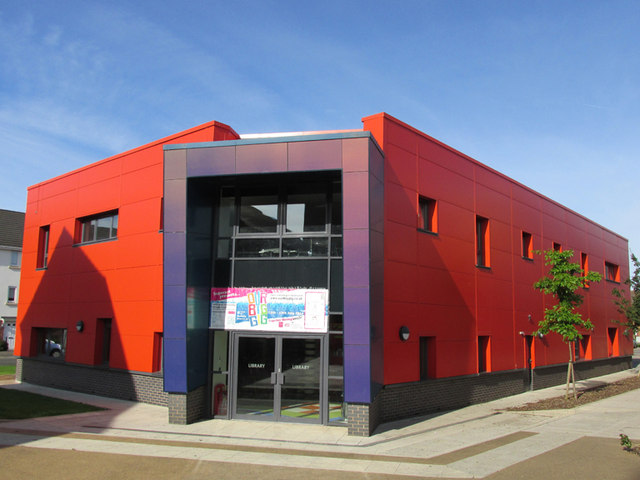
Shard End Library

Shard End Library opened in 1967 and was the first in Birmingham to use plastic membership cards instead of the traditional cardboard tickets. Some of the housing deteriorated in later years, but has improved as tenants have bought their homes.

=== Development in the 1970s ===
After the estate was built in the 1940s, a large swathe of green land remained along the River Cole valley, called 'the cow fields'. In the early 1950s local people – particularly at the Bailey Bridge end of Shard End Crescent – would graze cows on these fields. The fields provided valuable recreation space for the population of Shard End.

During the late 1970s, however, this tract of land was almost completely built upon and the area lost much of its charm. Since the building of this development, and a sharp decline in employment levels during the 1980s, Shard End has seen a marked increase in the problems typical of urban areas in large cities.

== Shard End 1990s ==
All Saints Church (Anglican) is situated in Coneyford Road. It was opened by the Queen in 1955. It has the distinction of being the first Church of England church to be built and consecrated after the war, anywhere in the country. There is also a Methodist and a Baptist church.

Shard End has its own community Centre on Packington Avenue, on the opposite side of the road to the Police Station. At one time, this station had the largest meeting room in the police sub division. There is a shopping area, crown post office and surgery on Shard End Crescent. Cole Hall Farm was derelict for a number of years but has now been converted into a pub. There are four primary and two secondary schools.

The River Cole, a tributary of the River Tame, runs through Shard End, into Kingshurst. It forms the heart of the Kingfisher Country Park.

The local library hosts the Shard End Local History Group once every month.

In January 2005, work on replacing a derelict petrol station with a community centre began. The building is a result of a partnership between Birmingham City Council and GOWM. Thomas Vale Construction are building the community centre.

In January 2013, work was completed on All Saints Square aiming to improve a deprived area of the city, housing a new Library, Birmingham City Council office and Shard End Post Office, alongside a number of other businesses. The development includes a large onsite car park with local bus services running through the area. The project included the construction of a number of new homes and apartments undertaken in partnership with Barratt Developments and Greswoulde construction.

75.6% of Shard End voters chose to Leave during the 2016 United Kingdom European Union membership referendum. This was the highest of any ward in Birmingham.

== Demographics ==
At the 2021 census, Shard End had a population of 7,423.

== Transport ==
The area is served by Lea Hall railway station, located about 1.5 miles (2.4 km) to the south, on the Coventry to Birmingham New Street line with occasional services to Walsall and Rugeley Trent Valley. Shard End is served by the number 95 National Express West Midlands bus route to Birmingham city centre and Chelmsley Wood, which was formerly the 55.

== Notable people ==
Jeff Lynne of Electric Light Orchestra grew up in a council house at 368 Shard End Crescent in Shard End. The lyrics to the ELO song "All Over the World" mention Shard End along with cities like London, Hamburg, Paris, Rome, Tokyo and New York City. Roger Taylor (drummer of Duran Duran) also lived at 350 Shard End Crescent until the age of 11 and attended Timberley Lane School. The author and artist Geoff Bunn also grew up in the area. Justin Broadrick (founder of Godflesh and Jesu) was raised by his mother and stepfather in a hippy commune in Shard End.
