= Life in Christ (document) =

Theological Text

Life in Christ is a 1993 ecumenical document that covers the topic of moral theology, especially as it relates to the relationship between the Anglican communion and the Roman Catholic Church.

The document is historically relevant in that it presents the doctrinal views of the Church of England shortly before the latter began to accept the ordination of homosexuals and the ordination of women within its moral discipline.

The text, which is signed by Cormac Murphy O'Connor on the Catholic side and Mark Santer on the Anglican side, also gives a valuable portrait of Catholic teaching surrounding marriage, and why it is regarded as indissoluble.

Life in Christ was notably cited by Cardinal William Levada in his declaration on the motives for creating personal ordinariates for Anglicans entering the Catholic Church.
