= Beta integral =

Beta integral may refer to:

- beta function
- Barnes beta integral
