= Diocese of Nagpur =

Diocese of Nagpur may refer to:

- Roman Catholic Archdiocese of Nagpur
- Diocese of Nagpur (Church of North India)
