= Noel Hall (bishop) =

George Noel Lankester Hall was an Anglican bishop in India from 1936 to 1957.

He was born on Christmas Day 1891, educated at Bedford School and St John's College, Cambridge and ordained in 1918. His first post was a curacy at Christ Church, Luton. From 1917 to 1919 he was vice-principal of Ely Theological College. In that year he emigrated to India as an SPG missionary in Chota Nagpur. In 1936 he was elevated to the episcopate as its bishop, serving for 21 years. From 1957 to 1960 he was a Fellow of St Augustine's, Canterbury and died on 12 May 1962.

Church of England titles
Preceded by Kenneth William Stewart Kennedy	Bishop of Chota Nagpur; 1936–1957	Succeeded by B B Baskey
