= Kenneth Kennedy (bishop) =

Kenneth William Stewart Kennedy was an Anglican bishop in India from 1926 to 1936.

He was born into an ecclesiastical family. His father was the Very Revd Thomas Le Ban Kennedy, sometime Dean of Clogher., educated at The Royal School, Armagh and Trinity College, Dublin and ordained in 1890. His first post was a curacy at St Ann's Dublin. Emigrating to India, he was a Missionary priest with the Dublin University Mission to Chota Nagpur and then continued to serve the same area with the SPG until 1926. Then he became its Diocesan Bishop, a post he held for a decade. He was awarded the Kaisar-I-Hind Medal in 1933 and returned to his native Ireland three years later. His last post was that of Priest-in-charge of Rathmichael where he died on 9 December 1943.

== Notes ==
Church of England titles
Preceded by Alex Wood	Bishop of Chota Nagpur; 1926–1936	Succeeded by George Noel Lankester Hall
