= Winterval =

Winter holiday event in Birmingham, England

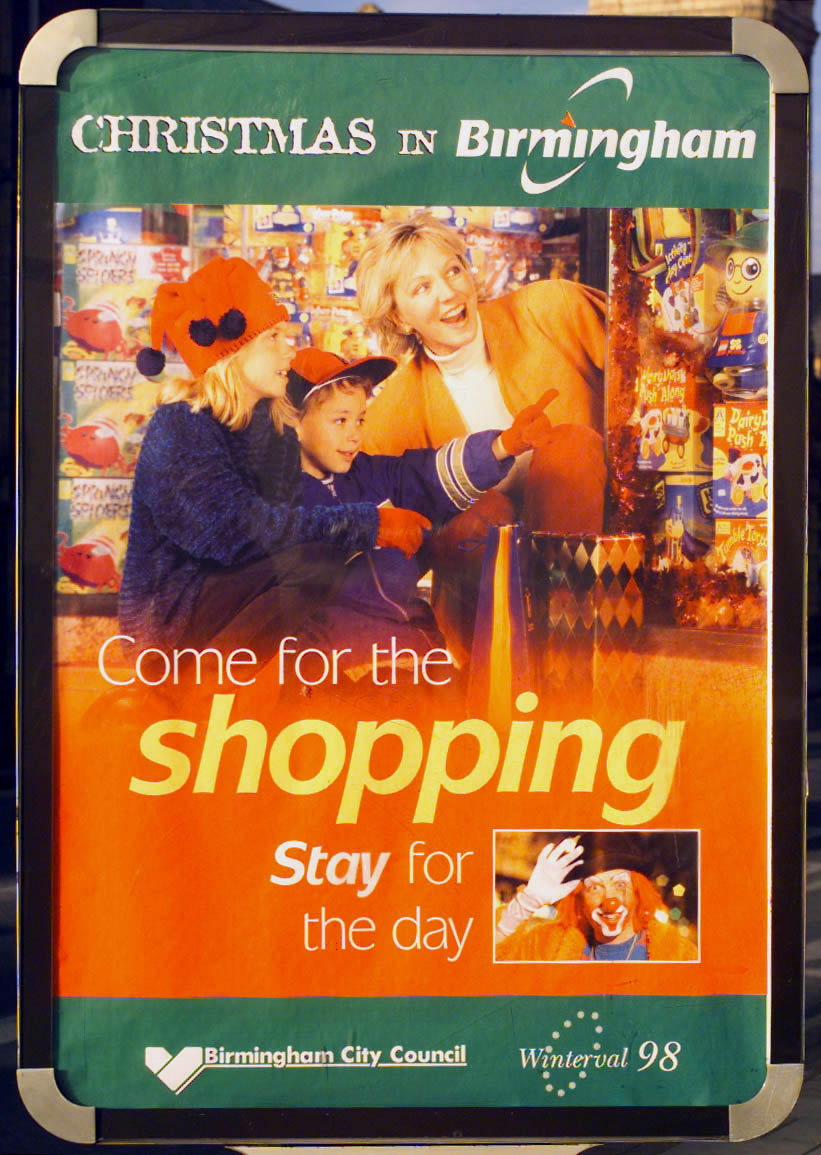
1998 'Christmas in Birmingham' poster, with the Winterval logo in smaller type than the word 'Christmas'

Winterval was a season of public events in Birmingham, England, organised by Birmingham City Council in each of two consecutive winters: first from 20 November to 31 December 1997, and then again from mid-October 1998 to mid-January 1999. The intention was to encourage people into the newly rejuvenated city centre, with secular and religious events marking religious and other occasions, including Christmas, during the relevant period. The name "Winterval" has since become used in the UK as shorthand for what are misrepresented as attempts to "rebrand" Christmas so as not to exclude non-Christians.

== 1997 ==
The name "Winterval" was a portmanteau of winter and festival, coined by the Council's Head of Events, Mike Chubb. In October 2008 he explained:

Quite simply, as head of events at that time, we needed a vehicle which could cover the marketing of a whole season of events... Diwali (the Festival of Lights), Christmas Lights switch-on, BBC Children in Need, Aston Hall by Candlelight, Chinese New Year, New Year's Eve, etc. Also, a season that included theatre shows, an open-air ice-rink, the Frankfurt Open-air Christmas Market and the Christmas seasonal retail offer. Christmas—called Christmas!—and its celebration lay at the heart of Winterval. Political correctness was never the reasoning behind Winterval, but yes, it was intended to be inclusive—which is no bad thing to my mind—and a brand to which other initiatives could be developed as part of the Winterval offer, in order to sell the city at a time when all cities are competing against each other for the seasonal trade.

The programme of events in 1997 included theatre and arts events; marking of Diwali; candlelit tours of Aston Hall; an outdoor ice rink; a German-style Christmas market; Christmas lights in the streets; and a New Year's Eve Party. The front cover of the promotional brochure used the word "Christmas" three times and featured a photograph of the City's official Christmas tree. Each of its six pages featured the word "Christmas" in text or images.

== 1998 ==
The extended Winterval the following year included: Hallowe'en; Guy Fawkes Night; Diwali; Ramadan and Eid; Hanukkah; Advent, Christmas, and Boxing Day; New Year's Eve; and Chinese New Year.

Posters were displayed, advertising Christmas events, with the word "Christmas" in large type, and the "Winterval 98" logo only as a footnote.

Church of England leaders in Birmingham criticised the 1998 "Winterval" concept. Mark Santer, then Bishop of Birmingham, said in a message to his parishes that he "laughed out loud" when he learned of the concept of Winterval, which he considered to be "a way of not talking about Christmas" and "a well-meaning attempt not to offend". He wondered whether Christianity had been censored. The Archdeacon of Aston called it "a totally unnecessary example of political correctness to avoid sensitivities people simply do not have". The council responded that "Christmas is the very heart of Winterval", saying that Christmas-themed events were prominent among those included in Winterval, and that Christmas-related words and symbols were prominent in its publicity material. While the Winterval season was longer than the Christmas season, Christmas was the focus of the relevant portion of Winterval, and a statement from Birmingham Council explained:

...there was a banner saying Merry Christmas across the front of the council house, Christmas lights, Christmas trees in the main civil squares, regular carol-singing sessions by school choirs, and the Lord Mayor sent a Christmas card with a traditional Christmas scene wishing everyone a Merry Christmas.

Neighbouring Solihull council invited Birmingham residents desiring a traditional Christmas to go there instead.

== Legacy ==
Birmingham City Council did not use the name "Winterval" after the 1998–9 season, but it persists as shorthand for any secular replacement for Christmas, used both by supporters and opponents of the traditional Christmas; it is also cited as a cautionary tale or urban legend by those who regard allegations of the existence of a "war on Christmas" as overblown.

On 8 November 2011 the Daily Mail issued a correction after using the term 'Winterval' in an opinion piece by Melanie Phillips, which it ran on 26 September 2011, stating:

A previous version of this article stated that Christmas has been renamed in various places Winterval. Winterval was the collective name for a season of public events, both religious and secular, which took place in Birmingham in 1997 and 1998. We are happy to make clear that Winterval did not rename or replace Christmas.

The lawyer and law correspondent David Allen Green, and the campaigner Inayat Bunglawala both included Winterval as an example in evidence to the Leveson Inquiry into the culture, practices and ethics of the British press. Green wrote:

Within the "blogosphere" here are a number of highly regarded bloggers who specialise in exposing poor quality or misleading journalism... What happens is that a selected news story or column is subjected to scrutiny ("fact-checked") and the apparent basis for the story or column questioned. One excellent example of this is the destruction by bloggers of the Tabloid staple of "Winterval"...

The city of Waterford in Ireland has named its municipal mid-winter festivities 'Winterval' since 2012 as an annual event that continues up to the present.

== See also ==
- Christmas controversies
- Christmas and holiday season
- List of winter festivals
- Winterlude – a winter festival held annually in the Canadian National Capital Region
