= Bishop of Birmingham =

Diocesan bishop in the Church of England

- Bishopric

anglican
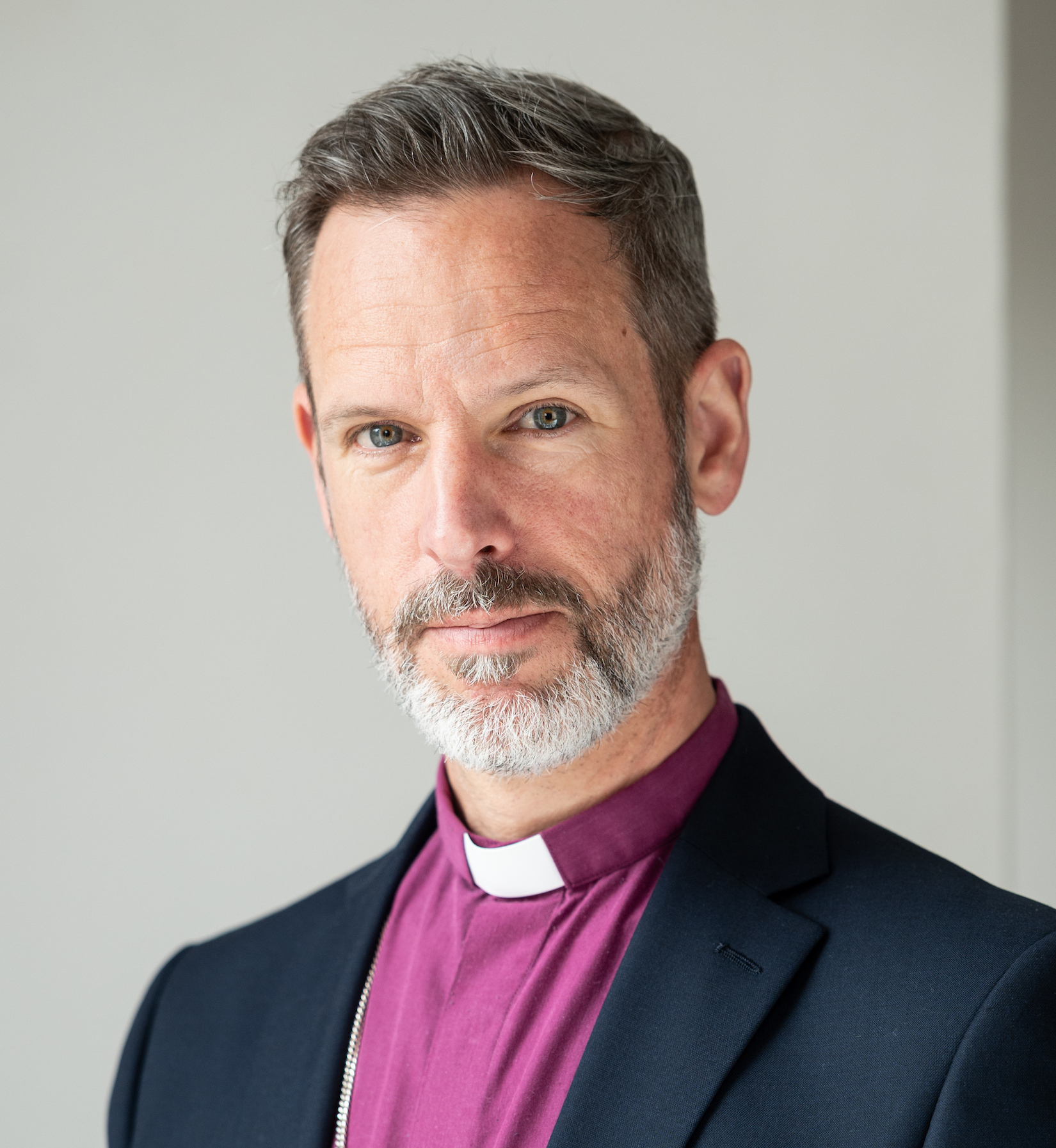
- Incumbent; Michael Volland

Location
- Ecclesiastical province: Canterbury
- Residence: Bishop's Croft, Harborne

Information
- First holder: Charles Gore
- Established: 1905
- Diocese: Birmingham
- Cathedral: St Philip's, Birmingham

The bishop of Birmingham is the diocesan bishop of the diocese of Birmingham in the Church of England. The bishop's seat, or cathedra, is at the Cathedral Church of Saint Philip in the city of Birmingham. The diocese covers the city of Birmingham and surrounding areas, including Smethwick, Solihull, and northern Warwickshire, and is within the province of Canterbury. The bishopric was created in 1905, when the diocese was formed from part of the diocese of Worcester. The bishop's residence is Bishop's Croft in Harborne, Birmingham.

The current bishop is Michael Volland, who took office on 22 November 2023. The diocese currently has one suffragan bishop, the bishop of Aston.

== List of bishops ==
Bishops of Birmingham
From	Until	Incumbent	Notes
1905	1911	Charles Gore	Translated from Worcester; nominated 20 January and invested 27 January 1905; translated to Oxford, 17 October 1911.
1911	1924	Henry Wakefield	Nominated 20 October and consecrated 28 October 1911; resigned 1 August 1924; died 9 January 1933.
1924	1953	Ernest Barnes	Previously a Canon of Westminster since 1918; nominated 1 September and consecrated 29 September 1924; resigned April 1953 and died 29 November 1953.
1953	1969	Leonard Wilson	Previously Bishop of Singapore (as a POW) 1941–1948 then Dean of Manchester since 1948; nominated 30 June and confirmed 28 September 1953; resigned 30 September 1969; died 18 August 1970.
1969	1977	Laurie Brown	Translated from Warrington; nominated 7 October and confirmed 9 December 1969; resigned 1 November 1977; died in 1993.
1977	1987	Hugh Montefiore	Translated from Kingston-upon-Thames; nominated 7 November 1977 and confirmed 23 February 1978; resigned in 1987; died 13 May 2005.
1987	2002	Mark Santer	Translated from Kensington; nominated and confirmed in 1987; resigned 31 May 2002; died 14 August 2024.
2002	2005	John Sentamu	Translated from Stepney; nominated 11 June 2002; translated to York in 2005.
2005	2006	Michael Whinney (Acting)	Assistant bishop and former Bishop of Southwell; acting in interregnum.
2006	2022	David Urquhart	Translated from Birkenhead; nominated 23 May 2006; inaugurated 17 November 2006; retired 18 October 2022.
2023	present	Michael Volland	Confirmed 22 November; consecrated 30 November 2023.

== Assistant bishops ==
Among those who have served as assistant bishops of the diocese were:

- 1913 – 1937 (ret.): Hamilton Baynes, Vicar/Provost of Birmingham (from 1931), former Bishop of Natal and Assistant Bishop of Southwell
- 1937–1958 (d.): James Linton, Rector of Handsworth and former Bishop in Persia
- 1951–1953 (res.): James Hughes, Vicar of Edgbaston and former Bishop of Barbados; became Bishop of Matabeleland and Archbishop of Central Africa, then Bishop of Trinidad
- 1962–1972: George Sinker, Provost of Birmingham and former Bishop in Nagpur
- 1988 – 1995 (ret.): Michael Whinney, Canon of Birmingham (from 1992), former Bishop suffragan of Aston and Bishop of Southwell
- 1997 – 2003 (ret.): David Evans, Gen. Sec. of SAMS and former Bishop in Peru

== See also ==
- Archbishop of Birmingham
- Bishop of Aston
