= Alex Wood (bishop) =

Scottish Anglican bishop (1871–1937)

Alex Wood (1871 – May 1937) was an Anglican bishop in India from 1919 to 1937.

He was born in 1871, educated at Aberdeen University and Edinburgh Theological College and ordained in 1895. His first post was a curacy at St John's Forfar. He was at the Scottish Episcopalian Mission at Chanda from 1898 to 1919, a period of service interrupted by World War I service as a temporary Chaplain to the Forces. In 1919 he became Bishop of Chota Nagpur and in 1926 was translated to Nagpur. He died in post in May 1937, his predecessor writing his biography.

Church of England titles
Preceded by Foss Westcott	Bishop of Chota Nagpur; 1919–1926	Succeeded by Kenneth William Stewart Kennedy
Preceded by Eyre Chatterton	Bishop of Nagpur; 1926–1937	Succeeded by Alexander Ogilvy Hardy
