= All Saints' Church, Shard End =

All Saints’ Church, Shard End
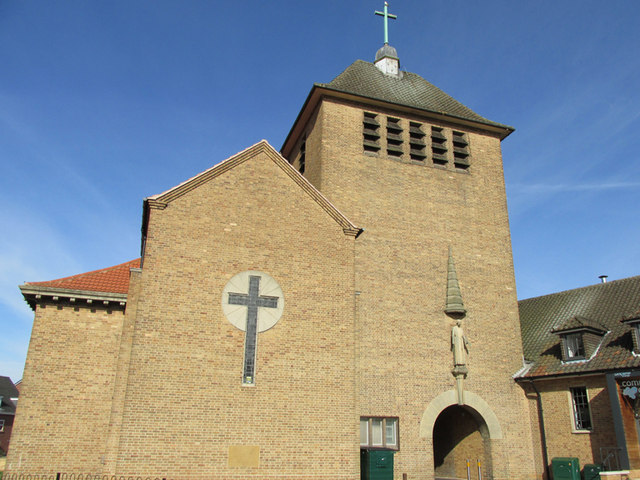
- All Saints’ Church, Shard End
- All Saints’ Church, Shard End
- 52°29′40.41″N 1°46′34.94″W
- OS grid reference: SP 15280 88527
- Location: Birmingham
- Country: England
- Denomination: Church of England

History
- Dedication: All Saints
- Consecrated: 1 November 1955

Architecture
- Architect: F J Osbourne
- Groundbreaking: 1954
- Completed: 1955

Administration
- Diocese: Anglican Diocese of Birmingham
- Archdeaconry: Aston
- Deanery: Coleshill
- Parish: All Saints, Shard End

Clergy
- Vicar: Reverend Mandy J Harris

All Saints’ Church, Shard End is a brick built Grade II listed Church of England parish church in Shard End, Birmingham.

== History ==
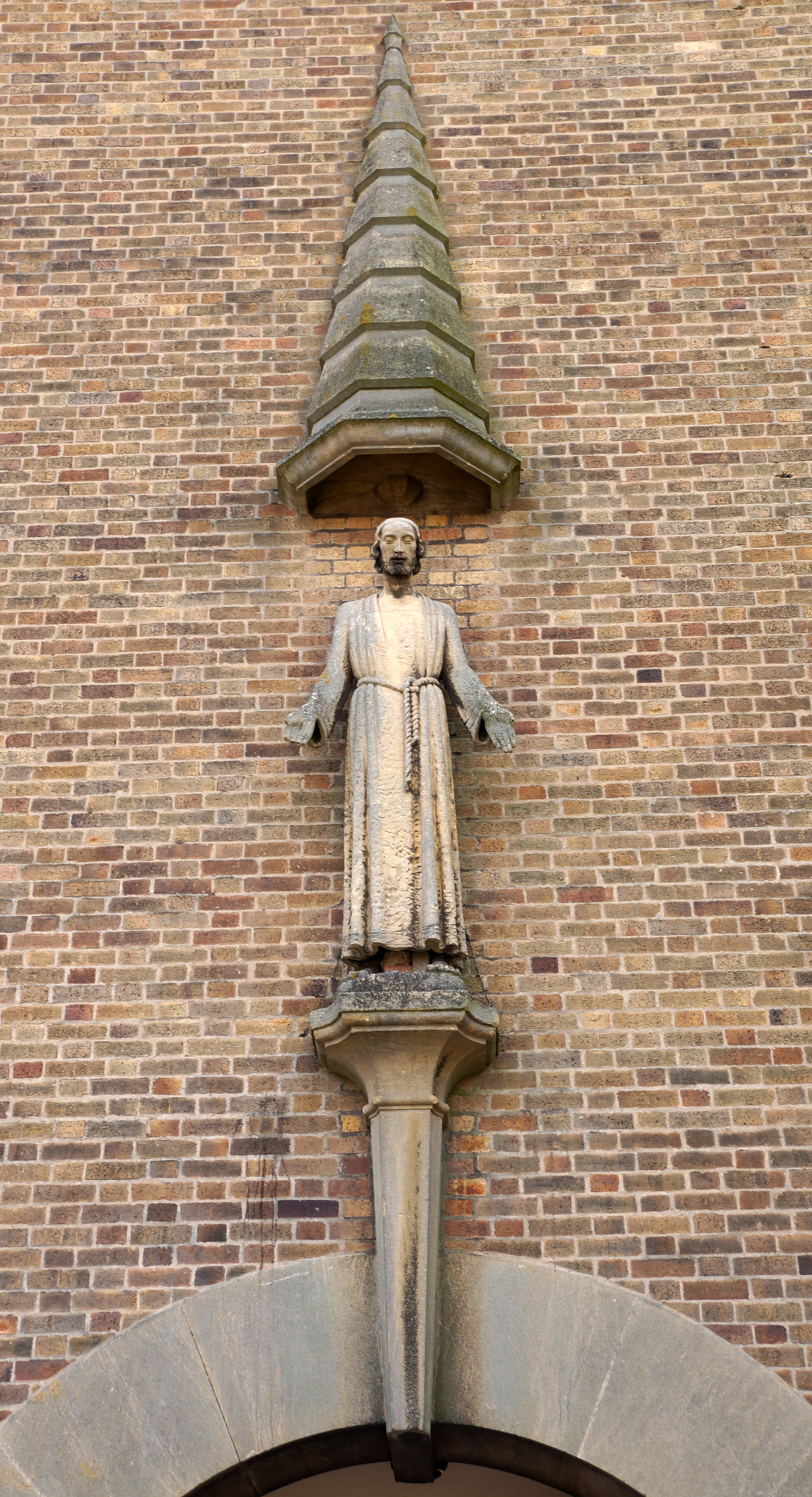
Statue of Christ by William Bloye

The church was built to serve the new estate of Shard End. It was named after a place of worship on Cooksey Road, Small Heath, which was destroyed by German bombs during The Blitz in the Second World War. The construction, which was funded by the War Damage Commission, began in 1954 and was built by C Bryant and Son Ltd (now Bryant Homes) to designs by local Birmingham architect, Frank J. Osborne (1886-1959), who designed many civic and industrial buildings in Birmingham. It was consecrated on 1 November 1955 by Leonard Wilson, the Bishop of Birmingham.

The attached community hall was completed soon after the visit of Queen Elizabeth II in 1955, and in 1966 a bell was installed in the tower, cast by John Taylor & Co.

In April 2022 it was one of six sites granted Grade II listed status by Historic England to reflect key social, technical and cultural changes over the 70 years of the Queen's reign as part of the Platinum Jubilee celebrations. Its listing notes its significance as being its simple design and high-quality craftsmanship, as well as sculptural works by William Bloye, including a statue of Christ installed above the entrance. All Saints was also the first church built in Birmingham after the Second World War - its historic significant being implied by the visit of the Queen on 3 November 1955.
