= Babb =

Babb is surname of mostly English origin which has been documented as far back as 1322 in Devon County, England. While the name appears to have originated in the Devon area, Y-DNA Genetic testing has revealed a number of distinct lineages throughout various parts of England.

The surname also appears in the Bavaria state of Germany. Y-DNA Genetic testing has confirmed that this Bavarian line does not relate to the Babbs of England.

== Notable people with the surname include ==
- Alfred Babb (1858–1933), American politician
- Charlie Babb (born 1950), American football player
- Charlie Babb (baseball) (1873–1954), American baseball player
- Chris Babb (born 1990), American basketball player
- Faith Babb (fl. 1980–2019), Belizean politician
- Gene Babb (1934–2018), American football player
- Glenn Babb (1943–2024), South African politician and diplomat
- Janet Babb, Geologist
- John H. Babb (1860–1938), American politician
- Keedie Babb (born 1982), British singer
- Kroger Babb (1906–1980), American film and television producer
- Michael Babb (born 1963), British sport shooter
- Louisa Elizabeth Babb (1861–1901), English actor using name Minnie Byron
- Phil Babb (born 1970), Irish footballer
- Pinky Babb, football coach
- Sanora Babb (1907–2005), American novelist and poet
- Sergio Babb (born 1982), Dutch footballer
- Stanley Nicholson Babb (1874–1957), British sculptor

== Other uses ==
- Babb Creek
- Babb, Montana, unincorporated community
- Bad Astronomy Bulletin Board, now merged and named BAUT.

== See also ==
- Bab (disambiguation)
- Babbs (surname)
