= Kingfisher Country Park =

Park in Birmingham, United Kingdom

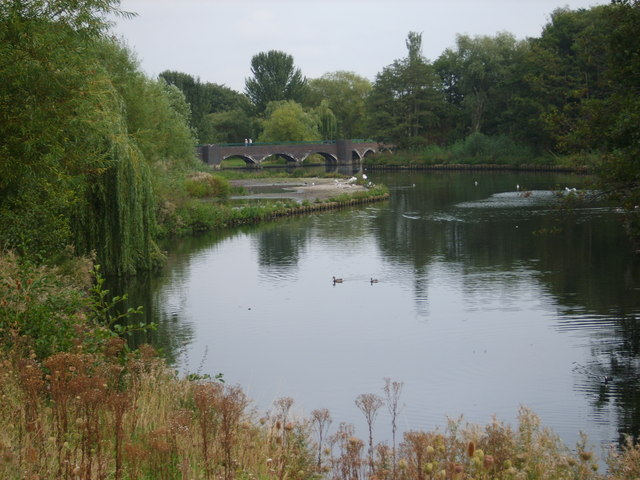
- Meriden Park lake, within Kingfisher Country Park, which flows into the River Cole
- Interactive map of Kingfisher Country Park
- Location: Birmingham and Metropolitan Borough of Solihull, England
- Coordinates: 52°29′37″N 1°47′42″W
- Area: 1,000 acres (4.0 km^{2}) approx.
- Operator: Birmingham City Council; Solihull MBC
- Website: www.birmingham.gov.uk/kingfisher

Kingfisher Country Park is a country park situated in the Metropolitan Borough of Solihull in England, straddling the historic border of Warwickshire and Worcestershire, mostly within the former. Initially designated as Project Kingfisher by Birmingham City Council, the park was formally declared a country park in July 2004. The country park is located along an 11 km (6.8 mi) stretch of the River Cole from Small Heath in Birmingham to Chelmsley Wood at the M6 motorway. It is a Local Nature Reserve.

== Project Kingfisher ==
The overall aim of the project was to preserve and care for the River Cole valley. The project was inaugurated in 1985.

=== Funding ===
Both the Birmingham City Council and the Solihull MBC sponsored the project in a joint venture. Charities and organisations that funded the project were:

- English Nature
- The Environment Agency
- Warwickshire Wildlife Trust
- Wildlife Trust for Birmingham and the Black Country

== Geography ==
The country park has an area of around 1,000 acres (4.0 km^{2}) and crosses the border between Birmingham and the Metropolitan Borough of Solihull. Within the original project, and now surrounding the country park, are several local nature reserves. These include Yorks Wood which was declared a local nature reserve by Solihull MBC in the 1990s after purchasing it in the 1980s. Other nature reserves include Babbs Mill Lake and Alcott Wood. Cole Bank, Smiths Wood, Elmdon Nature Park and Elmdon Coppice are proposed local nature reserves.

Flowing through the country park is the River Cole which forms the River Cole Valley. The valley is home to different wildlife habitats and different types of landscape. The area contains a number of artificial lakes surrounded by plants ranging from grassland, wetland and woodland which dates back hundreds of years. Babbs Mill Lake in Kingshurst was dug to be a balancing feature in times of flooding at the river. Shard End Lake was created as a result of an old quarry being filled with water.

The area is open to cyclists and walkers who can walk along the river towards other nearby country parks such as Shire Country Park and also walk to other places such as the Grand Union Canal, Coleshill, Kingshurst Brook, Meriden Park and Sheldon Country Park.

== Nature ==
Animals seen along the river include herons, kingfishers (note the project name), water voles and mink. In the ponds created in Shard End, many invertebrates have nested as well as many amphibians. Skylarks have been seen around the course grassland and they have bred successfully for a number of years.

== See also ==
- Yorks Wood
- Shard End Lake
- Babbs Mill Lake
