= Babs =

Babs or BABS may refer to:

== In entertainment ==
=== Films ===
- Babs (1920 film), a silent film starring Corinne Griffith
- Babs (2000 film), a 2000 Dutch film
- Babs (2017 film), a 2017 British film biopic of Dame Barbara Windsor

=== Fictional characters ===
- Babs, a character in the animated film Chicken Run
- Babs, a character in the book Just One Day by Gayle Forman
- Babs, a character in the webtoon series Live with Yourself!
- Babs Bunny, a character in Tiny Toon Adventures
- Babs Pewterschmidt, a character in Family Guy
- Babs Seed, a minor recurring character in My Little Pony: Friendship is Magic
- Babs Woods, a character in the British soap opera Family Affairs
- Babs Byuteman, a character in the Netflix television show Pinky Malinky
- Babs Johnson, the lead character in the 1972 film Pink Flamingos

== BABS ==
- Bay Area Bike Share
- Beam Approach Beacon System
- Bradburn Affect Balance Scale
- British Association of Barbershop Singers
- Build America Bonds, a type of municipal bond
- Baltic–Adriatic–Black Sea Initiative, or Three Seas Initiative, an intergovernmental cooperation in Central Europe

== Other uses ==
- Typhoon Babs
- Babs (land speed record car), built and driven by John Parry-Thomas in 1926
- Mitsubishi Ki-15, a Japanese World War II aircraft, Allied code name Babs

== See also ==
- Bab (disambiguation)
- BAB (disambiguation)
