= Alec Hardy =

Anglican bishop in India from 1937 to 1948

Alexander Ogilvy Hardy DD (called Alec; 1891 – 14 September 1970) was an Anglican bishop in India from 1937 to 1948.

He was educated at Trinity College Dublin and ordained in 1917. His first post was a curacy at Templemore. After this he was a SPG Missionary at Hazaribagh. Then he was Murhu for 20 years before his appointment to the episcopate as the Bishop of Nagpur. Finally he was Vicar of Gargrave, an Assistant Bishop in the Diocese of Bradford and an honorary canon of Bradford Cathedral until his retirement in 1957.

Church of England titles
Preceded by Alexander Wood	Bishop of Nagpur; 1937– 1948	Succeeded by George Sinker
