= Bab. =

"Bab." may be an abbreviation for:

- Charles Babington, an English botanist
- The Babylonian Talmud

== See also ==
- Bab (disambiguation)
