= Hugh Montefiore =

English Anglican bishop and academic

The Right Reverend Hugh Montefiore
- Bishop of Birmingham
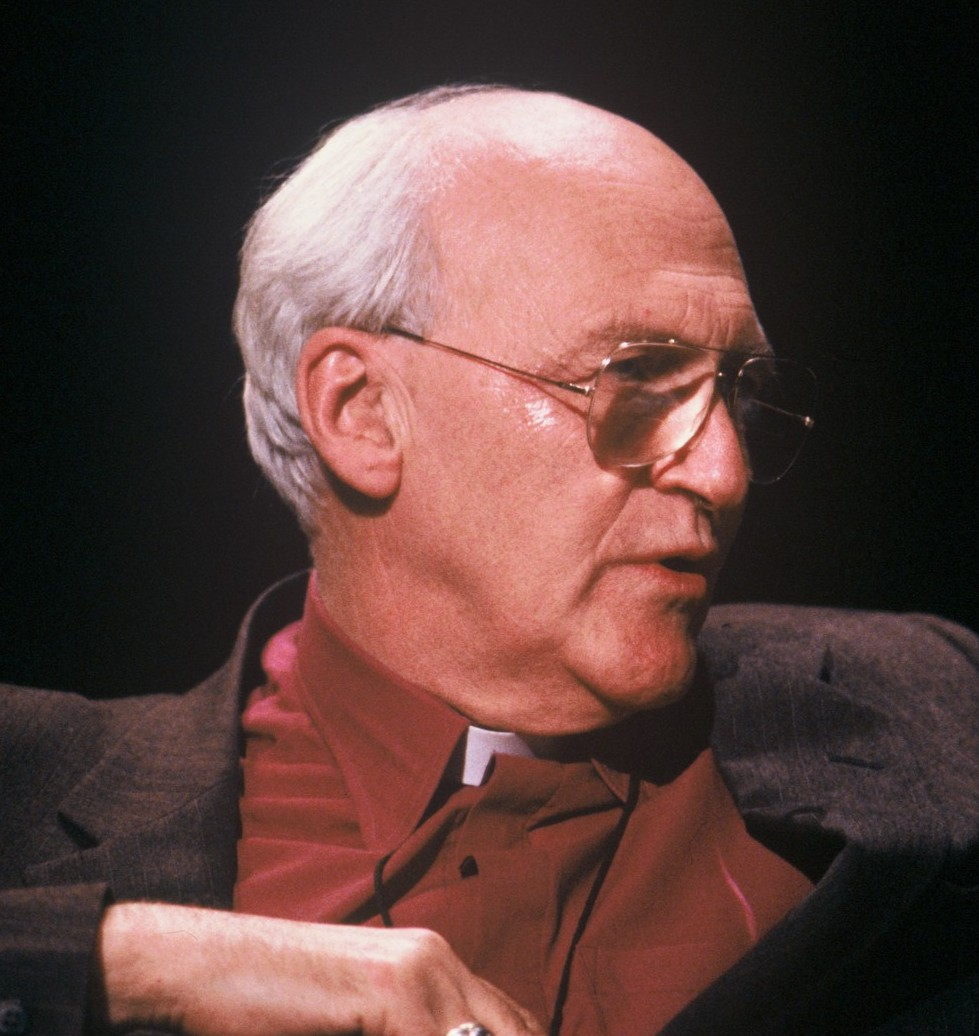
- Montefiore appearing on After Dark in 1987
- Church: Church of England
- Diocese: Diocese of Birmingham
- In office: 1978 to 1987
- Predecessor: Laurie Brown
- Successor: Mark Santer
- Other post: Bishop of Kingston (1970–1978)

Personal details
- Born: Hugh William Sebag-Montefiore; 12 May 1920
- Died: 13 May 2005 (aged 85)
- Denomination: Anglicanism

Hugh William Montefiore (born Hugh William Sebag-Montefiore; 12 May 1920 – 13 May 2005) was an English Anglican bishop and academic, who served as Bishop of Kingston from 1970 to 1978 and Bishop of Birmingham from 1978 to 1987.

== Early life and family ==
Montefiore was born in London, a member of a famous Jewish family. His parents were Charles Sebag-Montefiore (great-great-nephew of Moses Montefiore) and Muriel Alice Ruth de Pass.

On 1 December 1945 he married Elisabeth Mary MacDonald Paton (13 October 1919 – 14 November 1999), sister of William D.M. Paton, and daughter of William Paton and his wife Grace Mackenzie. The couple had three daughters: Teresa, Jan (now Professor Emerita of English literature from the University of Kent, also the wife of the journalist Patrick Cockburn), and Catherine.

== Career ==
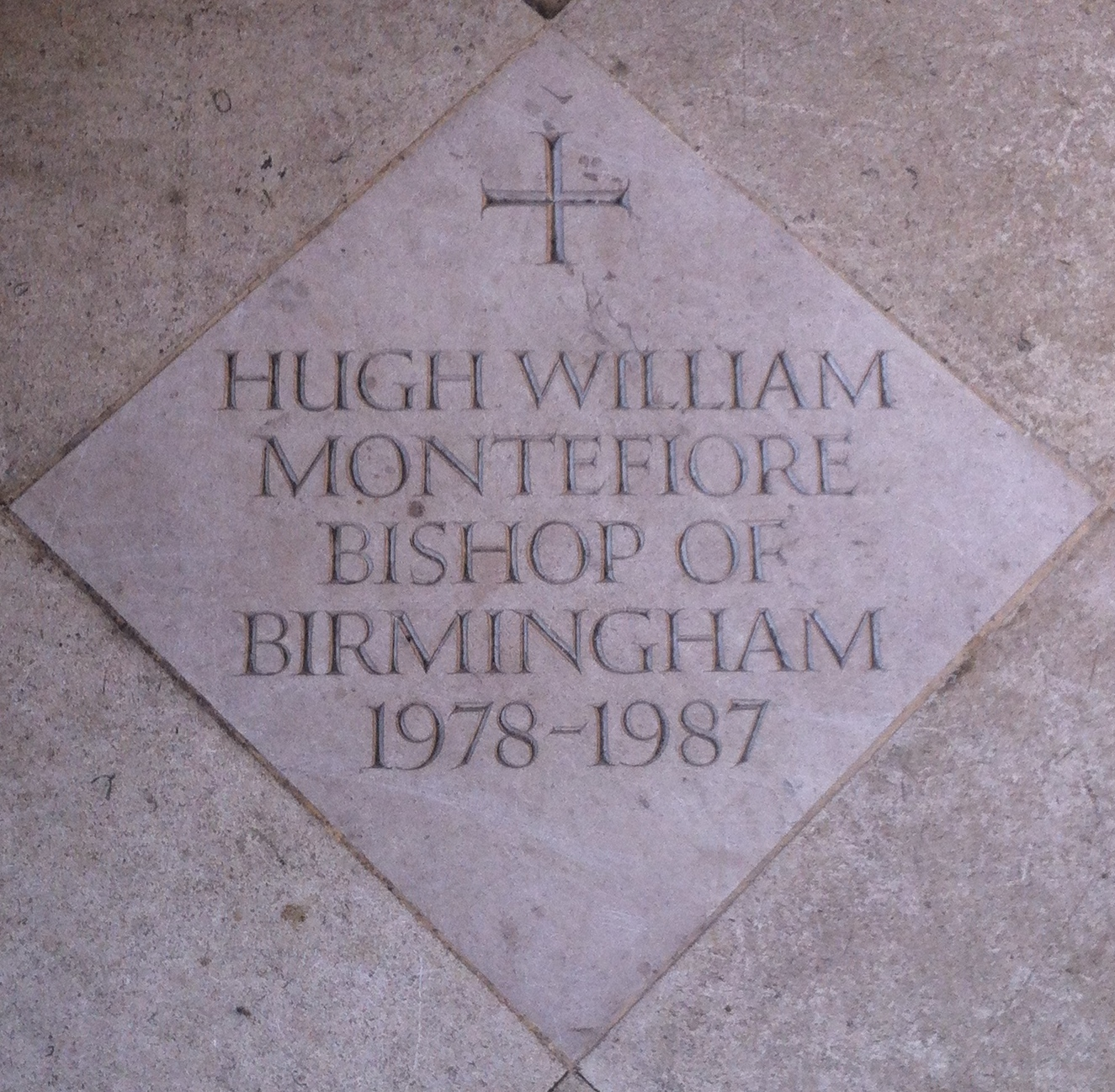
Memorial to Hugh William Montefiore in St Philip's Cathedral, Birmingham

Montefiore was educated at Rugby School, where he underwent a sudden conversion to Anglican Christianity after what he believed was a true vision of Jesus. He then served in World War II and gained the rank of Captain in the service of the Royal Artillery, in the Royal Buckinghamshire Yeomanry. Afterwards he graduated from St John's College, Oxford, with a Master of Arts (MA) in 1947, legally changing his name by Deed Poll on 7 January of that year, and from Westcott House, Cambridge.

He was ordained Deacon in 1949 and became the Dean of Gonville and Caius College, Cambridge, where he was a University Lecturer in Divinity. He graduated also from St John's College, Oxford University, in 1963 with a Bachelor of Divinity (BD).

He was Vicar of Great St Mary's, Cambridge, from 1963 to 1970, Bishop of Kingston-upon-Thames from 1970 to 1978 – he was consecrated at Southwark Cathedral on Michaelmas day (29 September) 1970 – and Bishop of Birmingham from 1978 to 1987.

Montefiore was the author of more than 20 books, including Thomas and the Evangelists (1962 with Hugh Turner), The Probability of God (1985), Christianity and Politics (1990), Credible Christianity (1993), On Being a Jewish Christian (1998) and The Paranormal: A Bishop Investigates (2002).

He was a Friends of the Earth trustee for two decades, but was forced to resign in 2004 after expressing support for nuclear power as a means to achieve climate change mitigation.

== Montefiore's views on Jesus' early life ==
In a paper read at the Conference of Modern Churchmen in 1967 titled "Jesus, the Revelation of God," Montefiore offers a controversial interpretation of the early life of Jesus. Jesus was not aware of his vocation as Messiah until approximately age thirty, Montefiore argues, and this vocation can therefore not explain the celibacy of Jesus. Apart from the Essenes, celibacy was not a common practice in Jewish life. Montefiore suggest we might need to look for a non-religious reason to explain the celibacy of Jesus:

Men usually remain unmarried for three reasons: either because they cannot afford to marry or there are no girls to marry (neither of these factors need have deterred Jesus); or because it is inexpedient for them to marry in the light of their vocation (we have already ruled this out during the ‘hidden years’ of Jesus’ life); or because they are homosexual in nature, in as much as women hold no special attraction for them. The homosexual explanation is one which we must not ignore.

Montefiore finds the explanation that Jesus was homosexual consistent with his identification with the poor and oppressed:

All the synoptic gospels show Jesus in close relationship with the ‘outsiders’ and the unloved. Publicans and sinners, prostitutes and criminals are among his acquaintances and companions. If Jesus were homosexual in nature (and this is the true explanation of his celibate state) then this would be further evidence of God’s self-identification with those who are unacceptable to the upholders of ‘The Establishment’ and social conventions.

Church of England titles
Preceded by William Gilpin	Bishop of Kingston; 1970–1978	Succeeded by Keith Sutton
Preceded by Laurie Brown	Bishop of Birmingham; 1977–1987	Succeeded by Mark Santer
