= Bab =

Bab or BAB can refer to:

- Bab (toponymy), a component of Arabic toponyms literally meaning "gate"
- Bab (Shia Islam), a term designating deputies of the Imams in Shia Islam
- Báb (Sayyid `Alí Muḥammad Shírází, 1819–1850), founder of Bábism and a central figure in the Bahá'í Faith
- Bab Ballads, cartoons published by W. S. Gilbert under the childhood nickname, Bab
- Biotechnology and Applied Biochemistry, an academic journal
- Boris Berezovsky (businessman) (1946–2013), Boris Abramovich Berezovsky, a powerful Russian oligarch in self-imposed exile in London from 2001
- Build America Bonds, a type of municipal bond created by the American Recovery and Reinvestment Act of 2009
- B. A. Baracus, character on 1980s action series The A-Team
- The British Aikido Board, a federation of independent Aikido associations within the United Kingdom
- British Agriculture Bureau, the Brussels office of the National Farmers' Union of England and Wales, National Farmers' Union of Scotland, and Ulster Farmers' Union
- Babcock International (stock symbol BAB)

== Places ==
- Bab-ı Âli, the gate to the palace of the Grand vizier of the Ottoman Empire
- Báb, Nitra District, a village and municipality in the Nitra District in western central Slovakia
- Back-arc basin, a geologic feature: a submarine basin associated with island arcs and subduction zones

== Transport ==
- Beale Air Force Base (IATA airport code: BAB), in California
- Bundesautobahn (BAB), federal motorways in Germany
- Balcombe railway station, a railway station in Sussex, England

== Entertainment ==
- "Base Attack Bonus", a term used in d20 System RPG games
- Bunty Aur Babli, a 2005 Indian film
- Bab (play), a 1920 Broadway play by Edward Childs Carpenter

== See also ==
- Babs (disambiguation) (includes BABS)
- Babb
- Babs (disambiguation)
- Babe (disambiguation)
- Baby (disambiguation)
- Babel (disambiguation)
- Bab. (disambiguation)
