= Laurie Brown (bishop) =

English Anglican clergyman

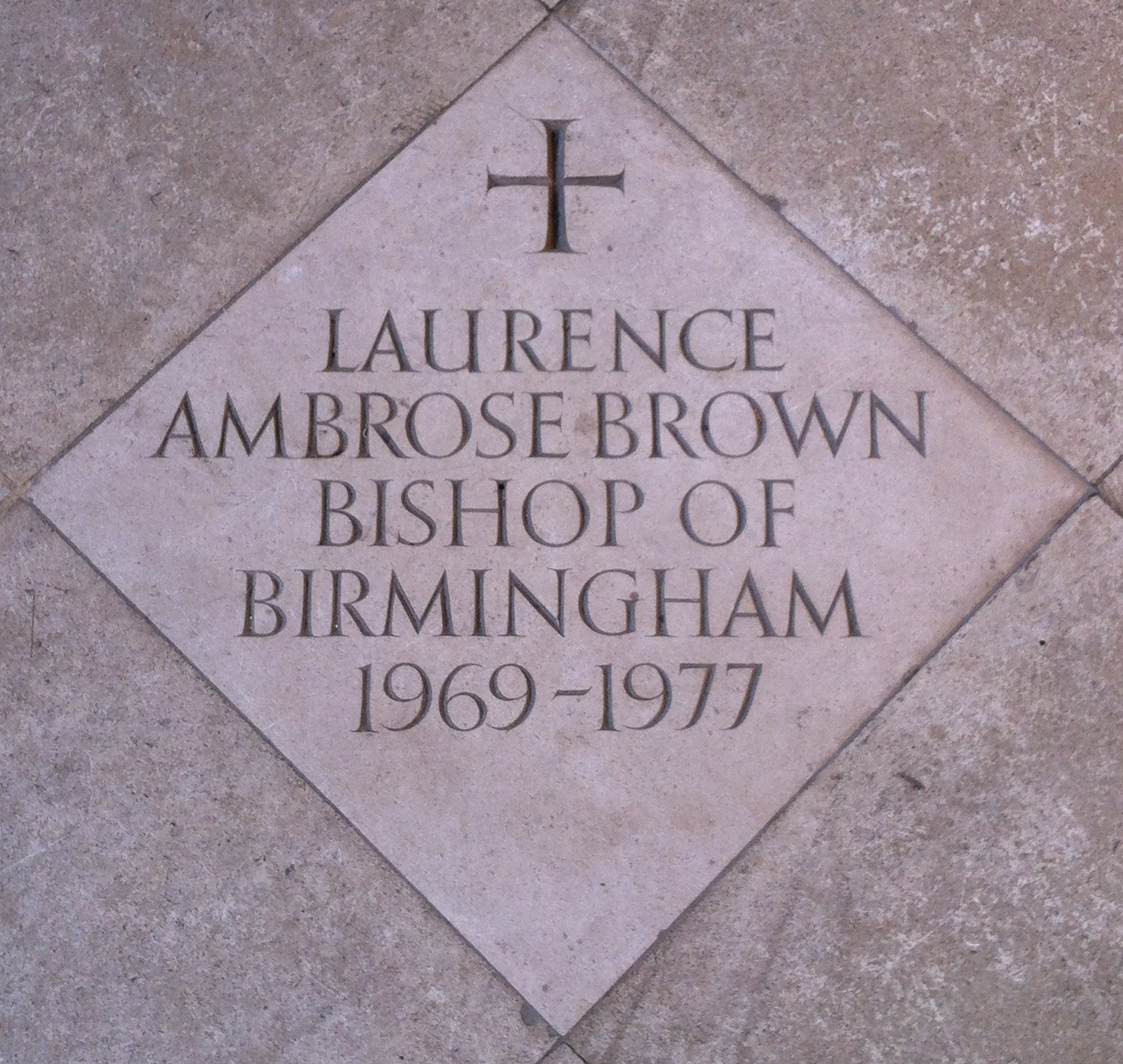
Memorial to Laurence Ambrose Brown in St Philip's Cathedral, Birmingham

Laurence Ambrose Brown (1 November 1907 – 7 February 1994) was an English Anglican clergyman who was Bishop of Birmingham from 1969 to 1977.

Brown was the son of F. J. Brown and was born at Basingstoke and educated at Luton Grammar School, Queens' College Cambridge and Cuddesdon Theological College, Oxford. In 1935 he married Florence Blanche Marshall.

Brown was a residentiary canon of Southwark Cathedral from 1950 to 1955, Archdeacon of Lewisham from 1955 to 1960 and Bishop of Warrington from 1960 to 1969.

Brown was secretary of the Southwark Diocesan Reorganisation Committee from 1946 to 1960 and secretary of the South London Church Fund from 1952 to 1960. He was also chairman of the Church of England Youth Council from 1961 to 1966.

Church of England titles
Preceded by Charles Claxton	Bishop of Warrington; 1960–1969	Succeeded by John Bickersteth
Preceded by Leonard Wilson	Bishop of Birmingham; 1969–1977	Succeeded by Hugh Montefiore
