= Ernest Barnes =

British mathematician (1874–1953)

The Right Reverend Ernest Barnes FRS
- Bishop of Birmingham
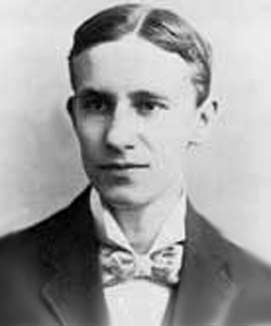
- Church: Church of England
- Province: Canterbury
- Diocese: Birmingham
- In office: 1924–1953
- Predecessor: Henry Wakefield
- Successor: Leonard Wilson

Orders
- Ordination: 1902 (deacon); 1903 (priest)
- Consecration: 1924

Personal details
- Born: Ernest William Barnes; 1 April 1874 Birmingham, England, United Kingdom of Great Britain and Ireland
- Died: 29 November 1953 (aged 79) Sussex, England, UK
- Denomination: Anglicanism
- Awards: Smith's Prize (1898)

Academic background
- Education: Trinity College, Cambridge
- Doctoral advisor: W. W. Rouse Ball

Academic work
- Discipline: Mathematics
- Institutions: Trinity College, Cambridge
- Doctoral students: J. E. Littlewood
- Main interests: Gamma function
- Notable ideas: Barnes integral

Ernest William Barnes FRS (1 April 1874 – 29 November 1953) was a British mathematician and scientist who later became a liberal theologian and bishop.

He was educated at King Edward's School, Birmingham, and Trinity College, Cambridge. He was Master of the Temple from 1915 to 1919. He was made Bishop of Birmingham in 1924, the only bishop appointed during Ramsay MacDonald's first term in office. His modernist views, in particular objection to Reservation, led to conflict with the Anglo-Catholics in his diocese. A biography by his son, Sir John Barnes, Ahead of His Age: Bishop Barnes of Birmingham, was published in 1979.

== Birth and education ==
Barnes was the eldest of four sons of John Starkie Barnes and Jane Elizabeth Kerry, both elementary school head-teachers. In 1883 Barnes' father was appointed Inspector of Schools in Birmingham, a position that he occupied throughout the rest of his working life. Barnes was educated at King Edward's School, Birmingham, and in 1893 went up to Cambridge as a Scholar of Trinity College. He was bracketed Second Wrangler in 1896 and was placed in the first division of the first class in Part II of the Mathematical Tripos in 1897. In the following year he was awarded the first Smith's Prize and was duly elected to a Trinity Fellowship. During his time as a Fellow he served on the committee of Cambridge University Liberal Club from 1899 to 1901. He was appointed a lecturer in mathematics in 1902, junior dean in 1906–1908 and a tutor in 1908. He graduated ScD of the University of Cambridge in 1907 and was elected a Fellow of the Royal Society in 1909. In the years that followed, Barnes was assigned to be Ramanujan's tutor and agreed with G. H. Hardy's assessment of his brilliance.

Barnes presented at the Gifford Lectures in Aberdeen in 1927, 1928 and 1929; he spoke on ‘Scientific Theory and Religion’. The lectures were published in 1933.

== Ministry ==
In the same year he became a lecturer in mathematics, Barnes was made deacon by the Bishop of London and from 1906 to 1908 was Junior Dean of Trinity. In 1915, Barnes left Cambridge, and his career as a professional mathematician, upon his appointment as Master of the Temple in London. This was followed in 1918 by a canonry of Westminster Abbey. In 1924 he was consecrated as the Bishopric of Birmingham, an office he held until April 1953, when he had to retire on account of ill-health.

== Controversies ==
Barnes was perhaps the best known liberal bishop of his time, identified with the modernist or broad church movement. His episcopate was marked by continual controversy.

His book The Rise of Christianity (1947) attacked many Christian claims, including the virgin birth and the bodily resurrection of Christ.

He was also politically active. In 1940, he lost a libel case in which he had attacked the Cement Makers' Federation for allegedly holding up the supply of cement, for their own profit at a time of great national need, in the construction of air-raid shelters. Undaunted by this set-back, Barnes returned to his accusations on the cement ring in a speech he delivered in the House of Lords the following year.

== Pacifism and eugenics ==
He was an uncompromising pacifist, and spoke out against British participation in the Second World War. He also expressed eugenic views. Though a member of the Eugenic Society from 1924 until his death in 1953, it was not until after the Second World War that he openly argued in favour of voluntary sterilisation as a means to overcome the apparent prevalence of "mental deficiency" in society. Several of these eugenic-themed lectures gained significant newspaper coverage in The Times and The Manchester Guardian, sparking a fervent public debate in which inevitable – if not entirely justifiable – parallels were drawn between Barnes' arguments and Nazi ideology. In his latter years Barnes was thus a pacifist, religious leader and campaigner for the perceived declining cause of eugenics.

== Personal life ==
In 1916, Barnes married Adelaide Caroline Theresa Ward, daughter of Sir Adolphus Ward. Together they had two sons: John was a diplomat, who served as ambassador to Israel and the Netherlands; and William, a public servant and philanthropist.

He died at his home in Sussex at the age of 79, survived by his wife and two sons. A bronze memorial tablet to him, as the third bishop of Birmingham, was erected in the south aisle of Birmingham Cathedral, near where his ashes, together with those of his wife, are placed under the pavement marked by a slab with the initials "EWB".

== See also ==
- Barnes G-function
- Barnes integral
