= Harold Richards =

Welsh Anglican priest

John Harold Richards (13 December 1869 – 23 August 1952) was a Welsh Anglican priest.

He was born in Trawsgoed, Llanafan, Cardiganshire, and educated at Wrexham Grammar School and Fitzwilliam College, Cambridge. He was ordained in 1896 and began his ecclesiastical career with a curacy at St Matthew's, Cambridge. After this he held incumbencies at Bordesley, Coleshill and St Augustine's, Edgbaston. From 1920 to 1938 he was Archdeacon of Aston. In 1937 he became Provost of Birmingham Cathedral, and held the post for 11 years. He died in 1952.

Church of England titles
Preceded by Arthur Hamilton Baynes	Provost of Birmingham Cathedral; 1937–1948	Succeeded by Harold George Michael Clarke
