= Matt Thompson (priest) =

21st-century British Anglican priest

The Very Reverend Matt Thompson
- Dean of Birmingham
- Church: Church of England
- Diocese: Diocese of Birmingham
- In office: 30 September 2017 – present
- Predecessor: Catherine Ogle
- Previous post: Vicar of Bolton Parish Church (September 2008 – 30 September 2017)

Orders
- Ordination: 1994 (deacon); 1995 (priest)

Personal details
- Born: Matthew Thompson; 1968 (age 57–58)
- Denomination: Anglicanism
- Education: Corpus Christi College, Cambridge; Ridley Hall, Cambridge

Matthew Thompson (born 1968) is a British Anglican priest. Since 2017, he has been the Dean of Birmingham – head of the chapter of canons of Birmingham Cathedral and the most senior priest in the Diocese of Birmingham. He was previously, since 2008, vicar of Bolton Parish Church in the Diocese of Manchester.

== Early life and education ==
Thompson was born in 1968 and grew up in the West Midlands. He studied theology and religious studies at Corpus Christi College, Cambridge, graduating with a Bachelor of Arts (BA) degree in 1990: as per tradition, his BA degree was promoted to a Master of Arts (MA Cantab) degree in 1994. In 1991, he matriculated into Ridley Hall, Cambridge, an evangelical Anglican theological college, to train for ordained ministry. During this time he also continued his theological studies, and graduated from Corpus Christi College, Cambridge with a Master of Philosophy (MPhil) degree in 1994.

== Ordained ministry ==
Thompson was ordained in the Church of England as a deacon in 1994 and as a priest in 1995. From 1994 to 1997, he served his curacy at the Parish of the Ascension, Hulme in the Diocese of Manchester. He then joined the Langley and Parkfield Team Ministry, and where he was an assistant curate from 1997 to 1998 and as team vicar from 1998 to 2000. He was priest-in-charge of St Cross with St Paul, Clayton, Manchester between 2000 and 2008. He was additionally Area Dean of Ardwick from 2003 to 2008. In September 2008, he became priest-in-charge of Bolton Parish Church. In 2011, he was made Vicar of Bolton Parish Church. In 2012, he was made an honorary canon of Manchester Cathedral.

On 7 May 2017, it was announced that Thompson would be the next Dean of Birmingham, the head of the chapter of canons of Birmingham Cathedral and the most senior priest in the Diocese of Birmingham. He was installed as dean on 30 September 2017 during a service at the cathedral.

== Personal life ==
Thompson is married and has one child.
