= Eyre Chatterton =

Irish-born Anglican bishop and author

The Right Reverend Eyre Chatterton DD, FRGS
- Bishop of Nagpur
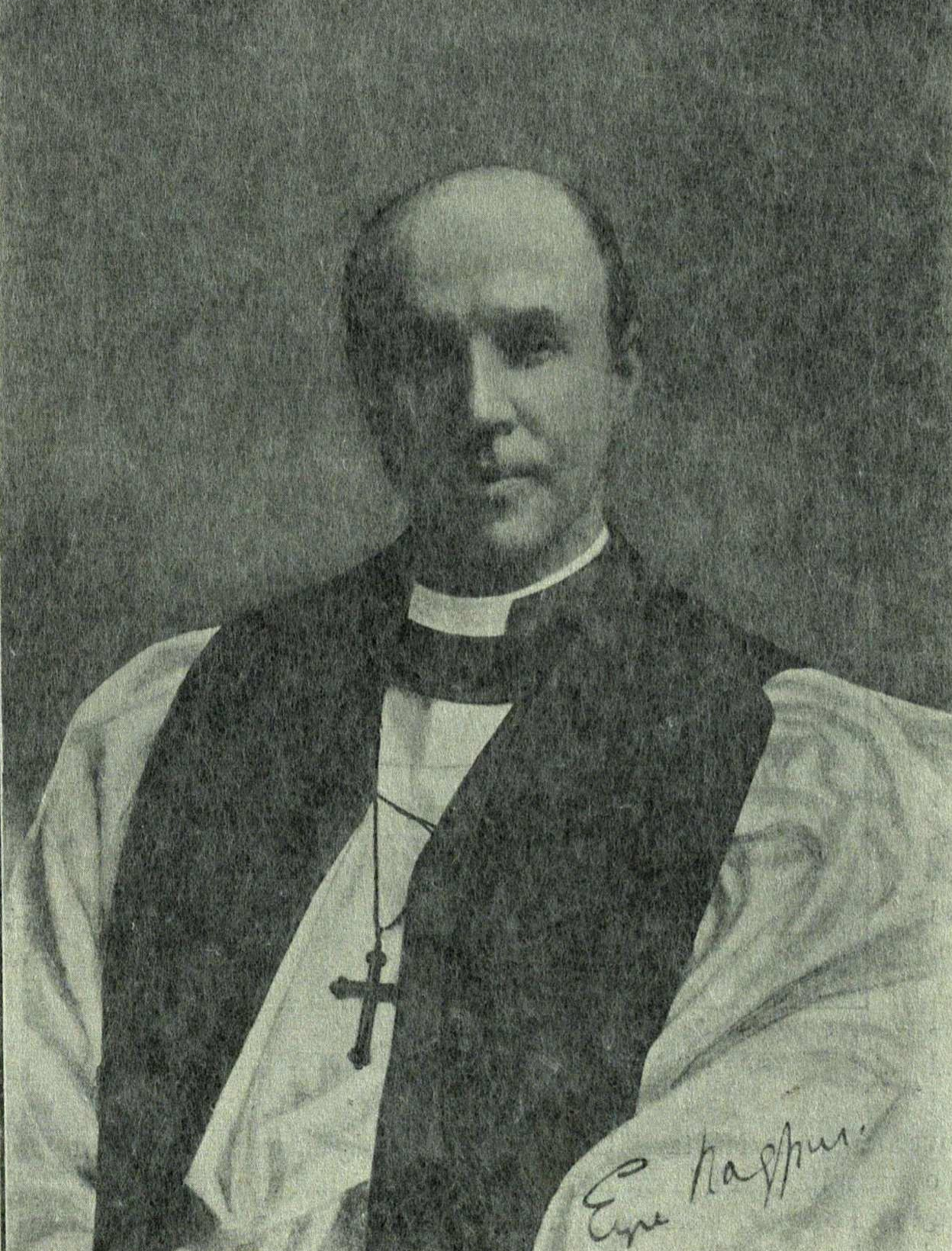

Personal details
- Born: 22 July 1863 Monkstown, County Cork
- Died: 8 December 1950 (aged 87) Richmond, Surrey

Eyre Chatterton (22 July 1863 – 8 December 1950) was an eminent Anglican author who served as a bishop in India from 1903 to 1926. He was also an amateur tennis player.

== Life ==
He was born in Monkstown, County Cork on 22 July 1863 and educated at Haileybury and Imperial Service College and Trinity College, Dublin. He was ordained by Bishop Lightfoot in 1887, and began his career with a curacy at Holy Trinity, Stockton-on-Tees. He was head of the Dublin University Mission to Chhöta Nagpur from 1891 to 1900 when he returned briefly to England to be curate of St Mary Magdalene, Richmond, Surrey. In 1902 it was announced he would become the inaugural bishop of Nagpur, a post he held for 23 years. He died on 8 December 1950.

Chatterton competed on the amateur tennis tour during the 1880s.

He was elected a Fellow of the Royal Geographical Society (FRGS) in December 1901.

In 1926 he was appointed an assistant bishop in the Diocese of Canterbury.

== Works ==
- The Story of Fifty Years' Mission Work in Chhota Nagpur. Society for Promoting Christian Knowledge. 1901.
- With the Troops in Mesopotamia, 1916
- The Story of Gondwana. Sir I. Pitman & Sons. 1916. with Stephen Hislop and Sir Richard Carnac Temple
- A History of the Church of England in India: Since the Early Days of the East India Company. Society for Promoting Christian Knowledge. 1924.
- Alex Wood, bishop of Nagpur, missionary, sportsman, philosopher: a memoir. Society for Promoting Christian Knowledge. 1939.
- India Through a Bishop's Diary: Or, Memories of an Indian Diocese, by Its First Bishop. Society for promoting Christian knowledge. 1935.
- Our Anglican Church in India, 1815-1946. Indian Church Aid Association. 1946.

== Notes ==
Church of England titles
New diocese	Bishop of Nagpur; 1903– 1926	Succeeded by Alexander Wood
