= Peter Berry (priest) =

Provost of Birmingham Cathedral, England

Peter Austin Berry (27 April 1935 – 26 May 2018) was an Anglican clergyman who served as the Provost of Birmingham Cathedral. He was educated at Solihull School and Keble College, Oxford. Ordained in 1963 he began his career as Chaplain to the Bishop of Coventry and was then successively Midlands Regional Officer to the Community Relations Communion and a Canon Residentiary at Coventry Cathedral before his 13-year stint at Birmingham Cathedral.

== Notes ==
Church of England titles
Preceded by Basil Moss	Provost of Birmingham Cathedral; 1986–1999	Succeeded by Gordon Mursell
