= Michael Clarke (priest) =

The Very Reverend Michael Clarke
- Provost of Birmingham
- Church: Church of England
- Province: Canterbury
- Diocese: Birmingham
- Installed: 1951
- Term ended: 1962
- Predecessor: Harold Richards
- Successor: George Sinker
- Other posts: Headmaster, Repton School

Orders
- Ordination: 1938 (deacon); 1939 (priest)

Personal details
- Born: 29 September 1898 Hull, Yorkshire, England
- Died: 19 August 1978 (aged 79–80) Dacorum, Hertfordshire, England
- Denomination: Anglican
- Education: Trinity College, Cambridge

Harold George Michael Clarke (29 September 1898 – 19 August 1978) was an Anglican priest and educator in the 20th century.

== Education ==
Clarke was educated at St Paul's School, London. His education was interrupted by the outbreak of World War I, and he served with the 2nd Field Company Royal Engineers in France during 1918. After the war he went up to Trinity College, Cambridge, where he took a first class in 1919 in the mathematics tripos part i, and a second class in 1921 in the history tripos part ii.

== Teaching career ==
He was an Assistant Master at Winchester College from 1921 to 1932, when he was appointed Headmaster of Rossall School, serving for five years until 1937.

In 1937 he became Headmaster of Repton School in Derbyshire. He led the school during one of the most difficult periods of its history, when mounting debts and falling numbers, together with the effects of the war, led to questions as to the continuing viability of the institution. Clarke was obliged to close houses and departments within the school during this period, successfully keeping it open.

Of his six immediate predecessors as Headmaster, five went on to very senior roles in the Church of England - a Dean of Winchester Cathedral, a Dean of York Minster, a Bishop of Oxford, and two Archbishops of Canterbury (William Temple and Geoffrey Fisher). In the same pattern, Clarke left the school in 1943 to pursue an ecclesiastical career.

== Church career ==
Clarke was ordained in 1938, whilst at Repton, and became Rector of Holy Trinity, St Marylebone in 1945. In 1951 he became Provost of Birmingham Cathedral, and held the post for over a decade, retiring in 1962.

== Private life ==
Clarke was a prominent Freemason, under the United Grand Lodge of England. He held multiple lodge memberships, including the prestigious Royal Somerset House and Inverness Lodge No 4 (which predates even the first Grand Lodge of 1717), and the Royal Alpha Lodge No 16, a private lodge of the Grand Master. He rose to prominence in Birmingham Freemasonry, being appointed Provincial Grand Master of the Provincial Grand Lodge of Warwickshire. He was installed in December 1953 by Roger Lumley, 11th Earl of Scarbrough, Grand Master. He held the position until 1965. He was also a very prominent member of the Holy Royal Arch, holding national office as the Third Grand Principal, one of three conjoint national leaders.

Church of England titles
Preceded by Harold Richards	Provost of Birmingham Cathedral; 1999 –2005	Succeeded by George Sinker
