= Basil Moss (priest) =

British priest

Basil Stanley Moss (7 October 1918 – 24 March 2006) was Provost of Birmingham Cathedral from 1972 to 1986.

He was born in Salford as the son of Canon H. G. Moss and was educated at Canon Slade Grammar School, Bolton and Queen's College, Oxford.

He was ordained as a priest in 1943 and was a tutor and sub-warden at Lincoln Theological College from 1945 to 1951. In 1950, he married Rachel Margaret Bailey. Appointed as senior tutor at St. Catharine's Cumberland Lodge, Windsor in 1951, he moved to be vicar of St. Nathaniel's Church, Bristol in 1953. Seven years later he became a Residentiary Canon of Bristol Cathedral, until in 1966 he was appointed chief secretary of the Advisory Council Churches Ministry.

As Provost of Birmingham Cathedral (1972–86), he also was chairman of both the Birmingham Community Relations Council (1973–81) and the Birmingham Council of Christian Churches (1977–79)

== Publications ==
- Moss, Basil S., Clergy Training Today, 1964
- Moss, Basil S. (ed.), Crisis for Baptism, 1965

Religious titles
Preceded by George Sinker	Provost of Birmingham Cathedral; 1972–1986	Succeeded by Peter Austin Berry
