= George Sinker =

George Sinker (5 May 1900 – 19 January 1986) was bishop of Nagpur and provost of Birmingham Cathedral.

He was born in Hyderabad, India, the son of the Reverend R Sinker, and was educated at Rossall School and Brasenose College, Oxford. In 1924 he married Eva Margaret, daughter of Colonel C H Madden OBE MC.

He served as a missionary for the Church Missionary Society in Kandy and Ceylon starting in 1921. In 1924 he was ordained in Bannu, North West Frontier Province, India. He moved to Peshawar in 1932. He was appointed headmaster of the Bishop Cotton School, Simla, in 1935, then canon of the Cathedral Church of the Resurrection, Lahore, 1944, and general secretary of the Bible Society for India and Ceylon in 1947. He was consecrated bishop of Nagpur in 1949.

On his return to the United Kingdom, he was successively Vicar of Bakewell (and an Assistant Bishop of Derby) from 1954 to 1962 and Provost of Birmingham Cathedral (and an Assistant Bishop of Birmingham) from 1962 to 1972. He died in Macclesfield in 1986.

== Publications ==
- Jesus loved Martha, Hodder and Stoughton, 1949.
- What was Jesus doing on the Cross?, India, 1952
- His Very Words, Hodder and Stoughton, 1953

Church of England titles
Preceded by Alec Hardy	Bishop of Nagpur; 1949–1954	Succeeded by Sadanand Appaji Pathak
Preceded by Michael Clarke	Provost of Birmingham Cathedral; 1962–1972	Succeeded by Basil Moss
Other offices
Preceded by J. S. M. Hooper; 1944-1947	General Secretary, Bible Society of India, Nagpur; 1947–1949	Succeeded by P. Mahanty; 1949-1958
