= Gordon Mursell =

British Anglican bishop (born 1949)

The Rt Revd Gordon Mursell MA (Oxon) BD ARCM
- Bishop of Stafford
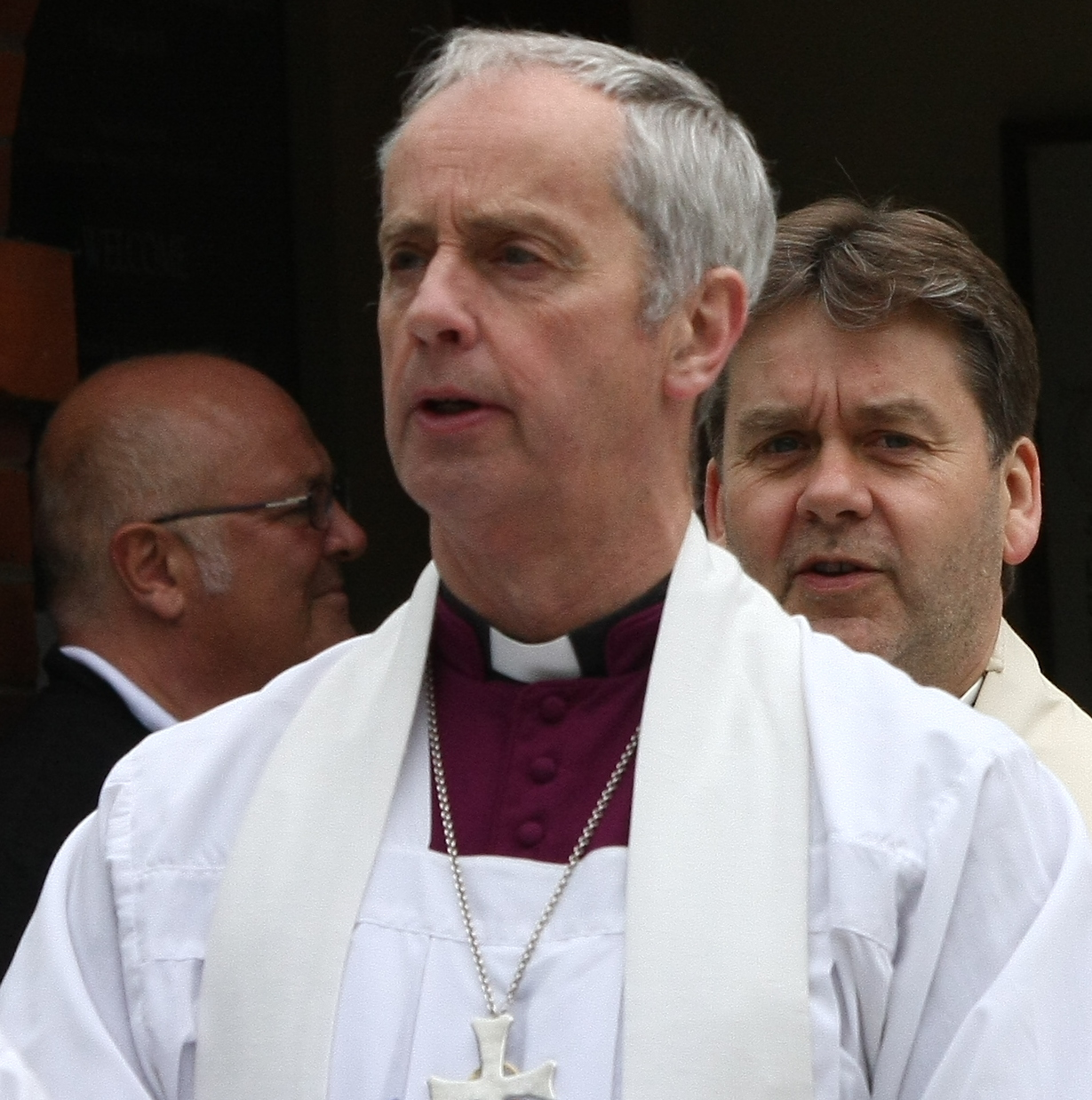
- Bishop Mursell in 2010
- Diocese: Diocese of Lichfield
- In office: 2005–2010
- Predecessor: Christopher Hill
- Successor: Geoff Annas
- Other posts: Honorary assistant bishop in Glasgow & Galloway (2010–present); Provost (1999–2002/3) then Dean of Birmingham (2002/3–2005)

Orders
- Ordination: 1973 (deacon); 1974 (priest)
- Consecration: 2005

Personal details
- Born: 4 May 1949 (age 77)
- Denomination: Anglican
- Parents: Philip & Sheena
- Spouse: Anne Muir (m. 1989)
- Profession: Author (theology)
- Education: Brasenose College, Oxford

Alfred Gordon Mursell (born 4 May 1949) is a retired British Anglican bishop and author. From 2005 to 2010, he was the Bishop of Stafford in the Church of England.

Mursell was educated at Ardingly College and Brasenose College, Oxford. Ordained in 1974 he began his career with a curacy at St Mary Walton, Liverpool and was then successively Vicar of St John's East Dulwich, a tutor at Wells Theological College, Team Rector of Stafford (1991–1999), Provost (1999–2002/3) (Note: Mursell is described as Provost on 22 February 2002 and as Dean on 31 October 2003.) and then Dean of Birmingham (2002/3–2005) before his ordination to the episcopate as the suffragan Bishop of Stafford - a post he vacated in June 2010. A prolific author, he is also a keen hill walker. He is a member of the Athenaeum Club.

== Publications ==
- The Theology of the Carthusian Life (1988)
- Out of the Deep: prayer as protest (1989)
- The Wisdom of the Anglo-Saxons (1996)
- English Spirituality (2001)
- The Bonds of Love: St Peter Damian's Theology of the Spiritual Life (2021)

== Styles ==
- Gordon Mursell (1949–1974)
- The Revd Gordon Mursell (1974–1999)
- The Very Revd Gordon Mursell (1999–2005)
- The Rt Revd Gordon Mursell (2005–present)

== Notes ==
Church of England titles
Preceded by Peter Berry	Provost, then Dean of Birmingham; 1999–2005	Succeeded by Robert Wilkes
Preceded by Christopher Hill	Bishop of Stafford; 2005–2010	Succeeded by Geoff Annas
