= Geoff Annas =

British retired Anglican bishop

The Right Reverend Geoff Annas
- area Bishop of Stafford
- Church: Church of England
- Diocese: Diocese of Lichfield
- In office: 2010–2019
- Predecessor: Gordon Mursell
- Other post: Acting Bishop of Southampton (2023–present)
- Previous post: Vicar of Thornhill, Southampton (1994–2010)

Orders
- Ordination: 1983 (deacon); 1984 (priest) by Ronald Bowlby
- Consecration: 21 September 2010 by Rowan Williams

Personal details
- Born: 29 November 1953 (age 72) London, England
- Denomination: Anglican
- Parents: Derek Annas and Betty Deverill
- Spouse: Ann (m. 1987)
- Children: 1 adult daughter & 1 adult son: Katie & Ben
- Profession: formerly social worker

Geoffrey Peter Annas (born 29 November 1953) is a British retired Anglican bishop who served as the area Bishop of Stafford in the Church of England.

== Education and career ==
Born in London, Annas was a senior social worker before attending Salisbury and Wells Theological College. Upon leaving theological college, he was ordained a deacon at Petertide (on 3 July) 1983 and a priest the following Petertide (1 July 1984), both times by Ronald Bowlby, Bishop of Southwark, in Southwark Cathedral, and became a curate at Holy Trinity with St Matthew, Southwark until 1987. Annas then served as a Team Vicar at St Christopher's Church, Walworth and Warden of the Pembroke College Mission before moving to Southampton in 1994 to be Vicar of St Christopher's Church, Thornhill. He also acted as Theatre Chaplain to The Mayflower Theatre, Southampton from July 1996 to July 2010. In 2007, he additionally became Assistant Area Dean of Southampton and an honorary canon of Winchester Cathedral. He was also known within the local area for helping to set up the Street Pastor Scheme in Southampton, as well as being a Street Pastor himself.

It was announced on 2 June 2010 that Annas was to move to the Diocese of Lichfield as area Bishop of Stafford in late September 2010, in succession to Gordon Mursell, who retired early on grounds of ill health. Annas was consecrated on 21 September by Rowan Williams, Archbishop of Canterbury, at St Paul's Cathedral and installed on 26 September 2010. Annas retired effective 30 November 2019. He retired back to Southampton and has been licensed as an honorary assistant bishop of the Diocese of Winchester since 2020. Since November 2023, he has also been the acting Bishop of Southampton.

== Marriage and family ==
He has been married for 30 years to Dr Ann Clover (Annas) an ophthalmologist. They have one adult daughter (youngest child), and one adult son.

== Styles ==
- The Reverend Geoff Annas (1983–2007)
- The Reverend Canon Geoff Annas (2007–2010)
- The Right Reverend Geoff Annas (2010–present)

Church of England titles
Preceded by Gordon Mursell	Bishop of Stafford; 2010–2019	TBA
