= Robert Wilkes (priest) =

Robert Anthony 'Bob' Wilkes (born 2 September 1948) is an Anglican priest. From 2006 to 2009, he was Dean of Birmingham. He was latterly Vicar of St Michael at the North Gate in Oxford.

== Early life ==
He was educated at Pocklington School and Trinity College, Oxford.

== Ordained ministry ==
He was ordained in 1974 and began his ecclesiastical career with a curacy at St Oswald, Netherton, Merseyside, after which he was its Vicar until 1981 when he became Chaplain to the Bishop of Liverpool. From 1985 to 1998 he was Regional Secretary for the CMS in Pakistan and the Middle East. In 1999 he became Team Rector for the Mossley Hill area of Liverpool. He was appointed to Dean of Birmingham Cathedral in 2006, serving for three years. He was latterly vicar of St Michael at the North Gate, Oxford.

Church of England titles
Preceded by Gordon Mursell	Dean of Birmingham Cathedral; 2006–2009	Succeeded by Catherine Ogle
