= Catherine Ogle =

Anglican dean

The Very Reverend Catherine Ogle
- Dean of Winchester
- Church: Church of England
- Diocese: Diocese of Winchester
- In office: February 2017 to May 2025
- Previous post: Dean of Birmingham (2010–2017)

Orders
- Ordination: 1988 (deacon); 1994 (priest)

Personal details
- Born: 12 May 1961 (age 65) Upminster, London, England
- Denomination: Anglicanism

Catherine Ogle (born 12 May 1961) is a British retired Anglican priest. From February 2017 to May 2025, she was the Dean of Winchester. She was previously a parish priest in the Diocese of Ripon and Leeds and the Diocese of Wakefield, and then the Dean of Birmingham (2010–2017).

== Early life ==
Ogle was born on 12 May 1961 in Upminster, London. She is the daughter of Henry Charles Ogle and Josephine Ogle (née Bathard). She was educated at Perse School for Girls, a private school in Cambridge, Cambridgeshire. She studied at the University of Leeds, Fitzwilliam College, Cambridge and Westcott House.

== Ordained ministry ==
She was ordained deacon in 1988, then served as assistant curate at St Mary's Church, Middleton, Leeds from 1988 to 1991. She then worked as a Religious Programmes Editor with BBC Leeds from 1991 to 1995. She was ordained priest in 1994 and served as priest in charge of Woolley with West Bretton from 1995 to 2001. Catherine became Vicar of Huddersfield in 2001. She was also chaplain at the University of Huddersfield from 2003 to 2006 and was made an honorary Canon at Wakefield Cathedral in 2008. In 2010, she was appointed Dean of Birmingham; she was instituted at Birmingham Cathedral on 2 September 2010. She was instituted Dean of Winchester on 11 February 2017. The 37th known successive such Dean of the Cathedral, the 22nd was incidentally Newton Ogle who died in 1804. She is the first woman to lead the Cathedral's day-to-day ministry.

In November 2024, Ogle announced that she was to retire, for personal reasons, on 1 May 2025. Following a negative bishop's review of the cathedral, she announced on 3 March 2025 that she would be standing aside immediately as dean and that the vice-dean, Canon Roly Riem, would be taking over as interim dean (though she remained officially in post until her scheduled retirement).

Church of England titles
| Preceded by Robert Wilkes | Dean of Birmingham; 2010–2017 | Succeeded by Matt Thompson |
| Preceded by James Atwell | Dean of Winchester; 2017–2025 | TBA |
