= Leonard Wilson =

Bishop of Singapore (1897–1970)

John Leonard Wilson (23 November 1897 – 22 July 1970) was an Anglican bishop. He was Bishop of Singapore from 1941 to 1949 during the time of Japanese occupation and subsequently Dean of Manchester and Bishop of Birmingham.

== Education ==
Wilson was born in Gateshead, County Durham and educated at the Royal Grammar School, Newcastle upon Tyne, St John's School, Leatherhead, Knutsford Ordination Test School, The Queen's College, Oxford (shortened degree, Bachelor of Arts in theology 1922) and Wycliffe Hall, Oxford.

== Career ==
After serving as Dean of Hong Kong, Wilson became Bishop of Singapore in 1941.

At the time of the fall of Singapore in February 1942, Wilson, assisted by the Reverend Reginald Keith Sorby Adams of Saint Andrew's School, Singapore, and John Hayter, ministered unstintingly to the people of Singapore. Subsequently, they were able to continue their ministry for a year, thanks mainly to the help of a Christian Japanese officer Andrew Ogawa. However the growing popularity of the cathedral and the use of English was regarded by the Japanese authorities as a threat and in 1943 they were interned in Changi prison.

The discovery of some notes by Wilson about T. E. Lawrence (Lawrence of Arabia) raised suspicions of plans to stir up the local population to revolt. In the prison they worked hard to maintain morale. Wilson was then one of 57 civilians who were tortured by the Japanese authorities in the "Double Tenth Incident", so-called because it started with a raid on the Changi internment facility on 10 October 1943. The Japanese were seeking evidence that the internees had assisted in Operation Jaywick, in which Australian and British commandos operating from Australia sank several Japanese warships in Singapore's Keppel Harbour on 26 September 1943. Wilson was one of those who gave evidence of the nature of the torture to the investigation commission set up by the authorities of the Sime Road Internment Camp following the Japanese surrender in August 1945. By the end of the war he had made several conversions to Christianity, including some of the Japanese captors.

From 1949 to 1953, Wilson was Dean of Manchester and, from 1953 to 1969, Bishop of Birmingham in succession to the controversial Ernest William Barnes. In his time as a bishop, Wilson was frequently called on to give a Christian perspective on issues of peace and war, his wartime experiences giving him a moral platform from which to do so. He was an early supporter of the ordination of women. He was opposed to the death penalty and for the reform of the law on homosexual acts.

As president of the Modern Churchmen's Union, from 1958 to 1966, he was strongly involved in the controversies following the publication of Honest to God in 1964.

In 1966 Wilson gave the address at the memorial service for the wartime General Officer Commanding (Malaya), Arthur Ernest Percival, which was held at St Martin-in-the-Fields in London.

Wilson was appointed CMG in 1946 and KCMG in 1963.

The author of his ODNB article says that Wilson's "episcopate in Birmingham cemented a divided diocese, and strengthened the influence of the church on civic and social life".

== Personal life ==
In 1930, Wilson married Mary Phillips. They had a daughter and 4 sons.

Wilson's daughter, Susan Cole-King (23 April 1934 – 8 February 2001), was ordained as an Anglican priest. On 6 August 1998, at the Lambeth Conference, she gave the homily on her father's wartime experience and the need for peace. His son, Martin, was also an Anglican priest.

Wilson retired to Yorkshire in 1969. He died of a stroke on the way home after conducting the annual service of the Order of St Michael and St George at St Paul's Cathedral on 22 July 1970.

== Publications ==
- A Bishop Broadcasts. [With a portrait.] 11 pages, published by Singapore Auxiliary Diocesan Association [1947] (found in British Library catalogue).
- Contribution to Marriage, Sex and the Family. A Christian symposium. Edited by E. P. Smith. Wales Publishing Co.: London, 1959. (Referred to in ODNB article and found in the BL catalogue).

Church of England titles
Preceded by Ernest Barnes	Bishop of Birmingham; 1953–1969	Succeeded by Laurie Brown
Non-profit organization positions
Preceded by Cyril Norwood	President of the Modern Churchmen's Union; 1958 – c. 1966	Succeeded by Edward Carpenter
