= Mark Santer =

English Anglican bishop (1936–2024)

The Right Reverend Mark Santer
- Bishop of Birmingham
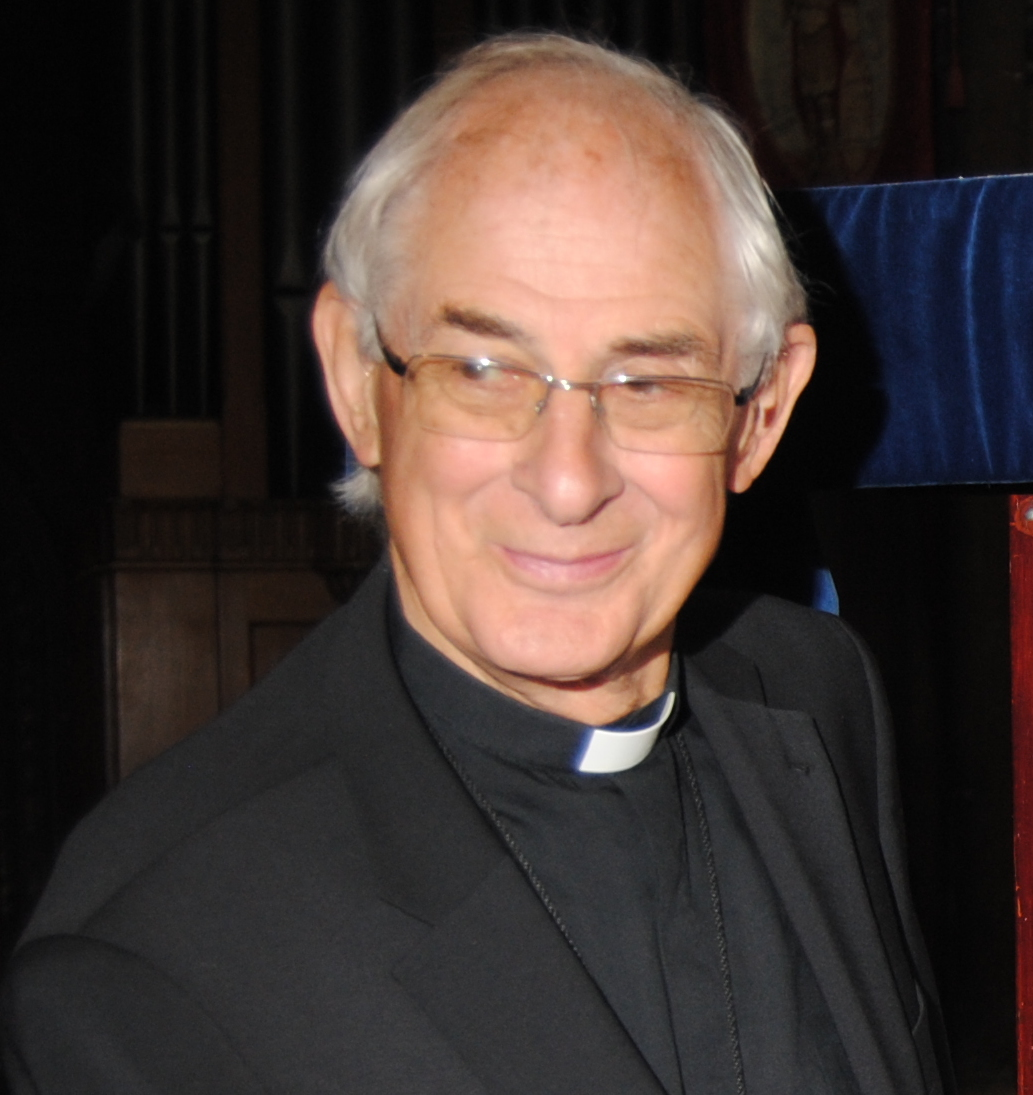
- Santer in 2015
- Church: Church of England
- Diocese: Birmingham
- In office: 1987–2002
- Predecessor: Hugh Montefiore
- Successor: John Sentamu
- Other posts: Honorary assistant bishop in Worcester (2002–2024); Bishop of Kensington (1981–1987); Principal of Westcott House (1972–1981)

Orders
- Ordination: 1964
- Consecration: 1981

Personal details
- Born: 29 December 1936
- Died: 14 August 2024 (aged 87) Poole, Dorset, England
- Denomination: Anglican
- Profession: Theologian
- Education: Queens' College, Cambridge
- Santer's voice recorded September 2015

Member of the House of Lords
- Lord Spiritual
- Bishop of Birmingham; 14 December 1994 – 31 May 2002

Mark Santer (29 December 1936 – 14 August 2024) was an English Anglican bishop. He was the father of television producer Diederick Santer.

== Early life and education ==
Santer was educated at Marlborough College and Queens' College, Cambridge, before his ordination in 1964.

== Ordained ministry ==
After being a curate at Church of All Saints, Cuddesdon, he was a tutor at Ripon College Cuddesdon; Dean and Fellow of Clare College, Cambridge; assistant lecturer in divinity at the University of Cambridge and finally Principal of Westcott House, Cambridge before his ordination to the episcopate as area Bishop of Kensington in 1981.

After six years at Kensington, he was translated to be the Bishop of Birmingham. During this time he took part in the second phase of the ecumenical discussions of the Anglican–Roman Catholic International Commission and was embroiled in controversy over the use of the term "Winterval", which he opposed.

== Retirement and death ==
In retirement he served as an assistant bishop in the Diocese of Worcester, while living in retirement in Moseley in Birmingham.

Santer died at his home in Poole on 14 August 2024, at the age of 87.

Church of England titles
| Preceded by Ronald Goodchild | Bishop of Kensington; 1981–1987 | Succeeded by John Hughes |
| Preceded by Hugh Montefiore | Bishop of Birmingham; 1987–2002 | Succeeded by John Sentamu |
