= Babbs (surname) =

Babbs is an English surname and may refer to:

- Ken Babbs (born 1939), American novelist, psychedelic leader and Merry Prankster of the 1960s
- Tank (American singer) (born 1976), real name Durrell Babbs, American singer

== See also ==
- Babb
