= Janet Babb =

Geologist; Hawaii expert

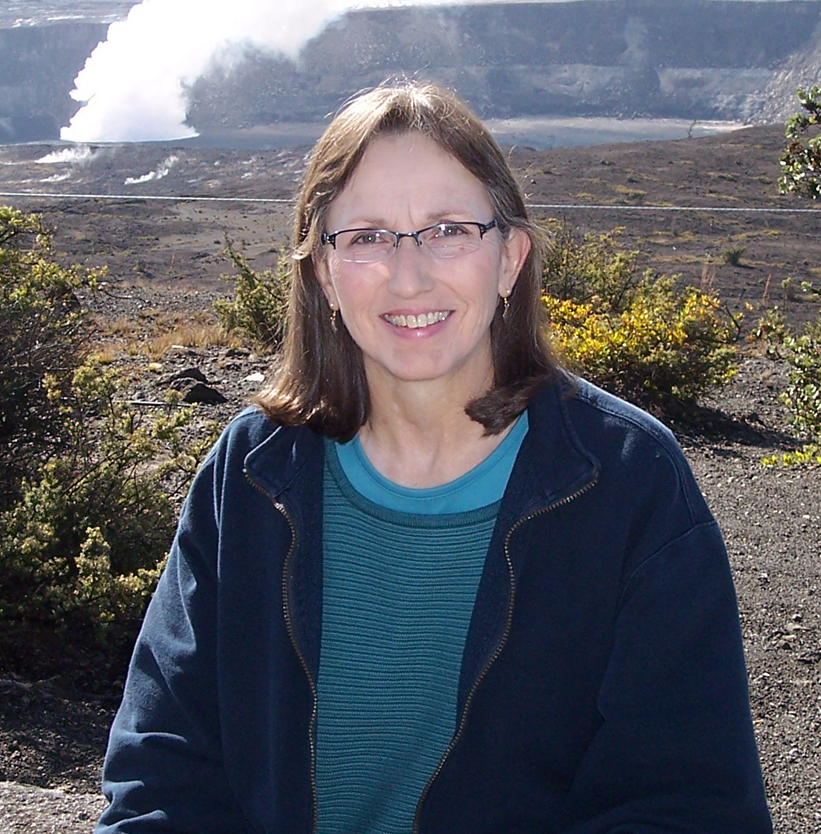
Babb in 2009

Janet L. Babb is a geologist retired from the U.S. Geological Survey who is best known for her work at the Hawaiian Volcano Observatory. As a spokesperson for the observatory and as a scientist with subject-matter expertise, Babb is frequently quoted in the news media as an authority source on Hawaiian volcanology. She was a member of the Hawaii Center for Volcanology during its operation. She hosted an event for prospective volcanologists at the Hawaii State Public Library System location at Honokaa in 2017. Babb retired in 2020 and was made a scientist emeritus.
