= Babbs Mill Lake =

Small lake in Solihull, England

- Kingshurst Lake
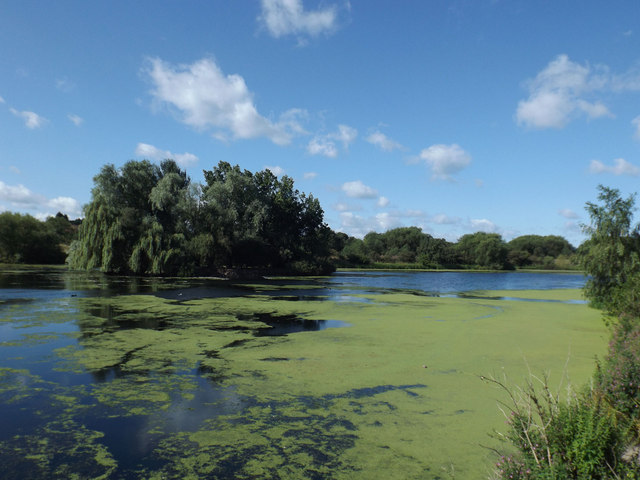
- The lake in 2014

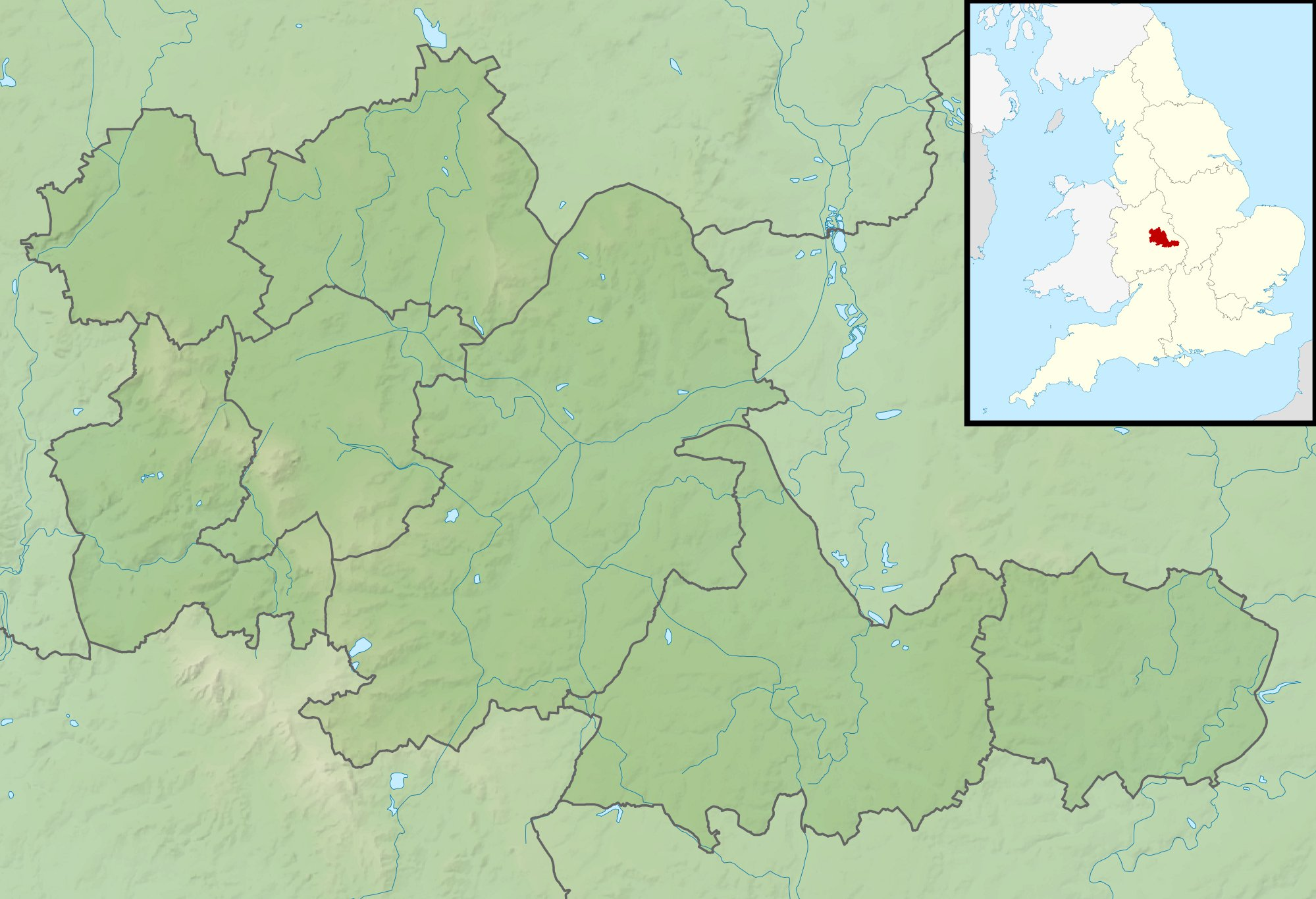
- Location within West Midlands county
- Location: Kingfisher Country Park, Kingshurst, England
- Coordinates: 52°29′14″N 1°45′30″W
- Type: reservoir
- Basin countries: United Kingdom

Babbs Mill Lake, sometimes called Kingshurst Lake, is a man-made lake in the Kingfisher Country Park in Kingshurst, Solihull in England. The lake was created as a balancing feature in times of flooding from the nearby River Cole.

== History ==
The lake gives its name to Babbs Mill Park, created to commemorate the Silver Jubilee of Queen Elizabeth II in 1977. It was designated a Local Nature Reserve in 2002.

In March 2016, Solihull Council's planning committee approved a scheme to build 52 houses on land amounting to approximately seven per cent of the reserve.

Since August 2019, Babbs Mill Lake has hosted a Parkrun.

=== 2022 children drownings ===
On 11 December 2022, four children fell through ice formed on the surface. On 12 December it was confirmed that three of the children had died, with the fourth child remaining in hospital in critical condition. It was announced on 14 December that the fourth child had died in hospital. An inquest concluded that the four deaths were accidental.
