= Dean of Birmingham =

Church of England senior clergy member

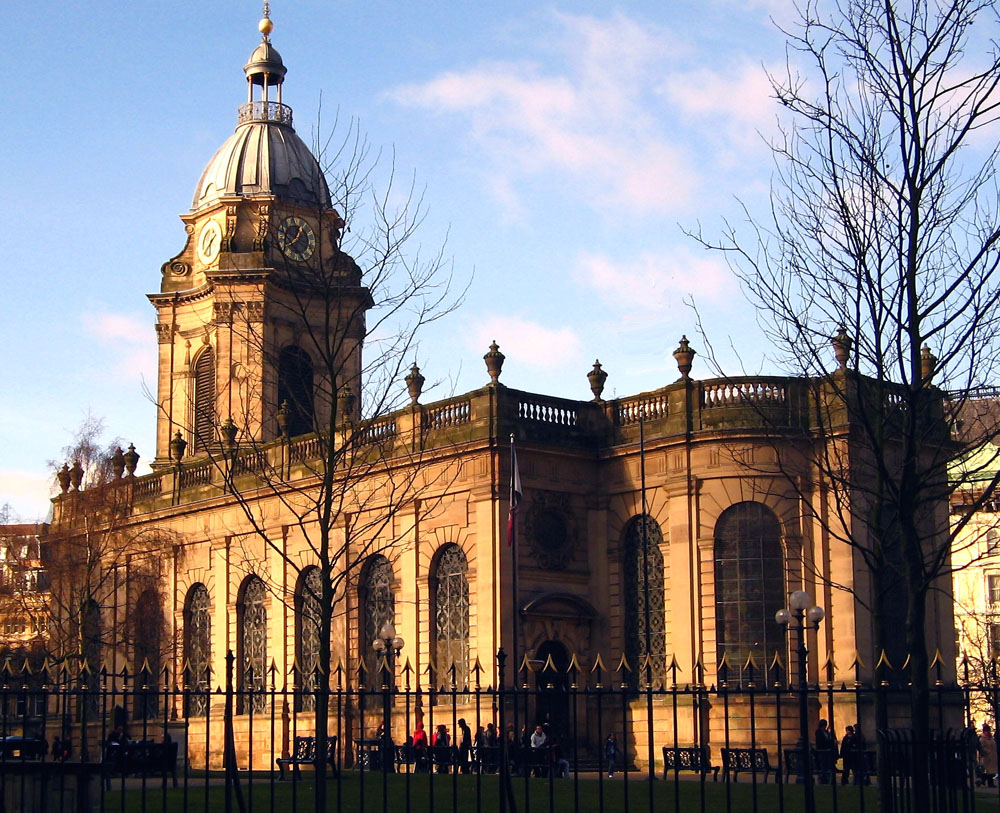
Birmingham Cathedral

The dean of Birmingham is the senior member of clergy responsible for St. Philip's Cathedral in Birmingham, England. Before 2000 the post was designated provost, which was the equivalent of a dean but used in the case of pro-cathedrals, such as Birmingham, which had originally been built as parish churches.

== List of provosts and deans ==
=== Provosts ===
- 1931–1937 Hamilton Baynes
- 1937–1949 Harold Richards
- 1951–1962 Michael Clarke
- 1962–1972 George Sinker
- 1972–1986 Basil Moss
- 1986–2000 Peter Berry
- 2000–c. 2002/3 (Note: Mursell is described as Provost on 22 February 2002 and as Dean on 31 October 2003.) Gordon Mursell (became Dean)

=== Deans ===
- 2002/3–2005 Gordon Mursell (previously Provost)
- 2006–2009 Robert Wilkes
- 2010–2017 Catherine Ogle (installed and inducted in September 2010)
- 30 September 2017 – present Matt Thompson

== See also ==
- Provost (religion)
