= Bradburn Affect Balance Scale =

Life quality scale

The Bradburn Affect Balance Scale is a self-report measure of quality of life. The scale consists of ten mood states (for example, item one is "particularly excited or interested in something"), and the subject must report if they have been in that state in the last week.

The scale was included in the 1978-1979 Canada Health Survey.
