= Pinky Babb =

Julius Wistar "Pinky" Babb (born in Princeton, South Carolina) is one of the nation's most storied high school football coaches. He coached for 39 seasons (1943–81) at Greenwood High School in Greenwood, South Carolina, amassing 336 victories and nine state titles.

== Background ==
Babb played college football at Furman University and was named all-state in 1936. He is a member of the Furman University Hall of Fame, having played on the very last Furman football team to beat in-state rival Clemson. Using the motto "Winners never quit and quitters never win," Babb's reputation and success as a coach at Greenwood High earned him a spot in the state athletic hall of fame and the National High School Coaches Association Hall of Fame, in 1996, the first year for inductees.

== At Greenwood High ==
Babb led the Emeralds (now called the Eagles) to an overall record of 336 wins, 81 losses and 23 ties. He is often mentioned alongside other South Carolina football coaching legends such as John McKissick (Summerville) and Willie Varner (Woodruff). McKissick, Varner and Babb are all among the top 20 in the nation in overall football victories. McKissick, who was born in Greenwood, has the most victories of all coaches nationally. Babb was a South Carolina Shrine Bowl coach, a North-South Game coach and the coach of numerous players who went on to play collegiately and in the professional ranks. One famous player was W.W. "Hootie" Johnson (1945–48). Johnson is the former chairman of The Augusta National golf course, where the Master's tournament is played each year.

== Other successes ==
Babb led the baseball team to the 1966 state championship, and he was also a successful American Legion baseball coach for Post 20. For his football efforts, he received some great praise when legendary Clemson football coach Frank Howard gave his introduction speech for Ara Parseghian, former Notre Dame coach, when Parseghian was named coach of the year. Howard told Parseghian at a special event, which Babb attended: "You and me are lucky to be on the same program with Pinky Babb. We sure as heck can't coach like him." In 1982, a year after Babb retired and the year before his death, the stadium at Greenwood High was named in his honor. The Greenwood Touchdown Club and The Index-Journal Newspaper in Greenwood have named a J.W. "Pinky" Babb Coach of the Year every year since 1996, the first year of the All-Lakelands Team, which honors players from four counties.
