= Yorks Wood =

Preserved woodland in England

Coordinates: 52.49151°N 1.75966°W

Yorks Wood is a Local Nature Reserve in Kingshurst, Solihull, England. It is an 11 hectares (27 acres) ancient wood of predominantly oak trees. The River Cole is located south of the wood and located within Kingfisher Country Park.

== History ==
The first mention of the wood is in 1456. It was stated as being owned by the Mountford family and being located within Kingshurst Park. The wood received its current name in the 19th century and by the 1920s, it was under the ownership of the Scout movement. In the 1970s, the fields surrounding the wood were sold to make way for housing development. The wood was preserved in the 1960s when the Kingshurst Hall Estate was completed so that it could act as a buffer between the estate and other nearby estates. Solihull Metropolitan Borough Council bought the wood in 1984 and designated it as a Local Nature Reserve in 1991.

== Nature ==
During May, the floor of the wood is covered in bluebells and towards the closing of the year, fungi can be seen. During spring, wood anemone, and celandine are located in different parts of the forest.

The wood is home to various species of birds, such as spotted woodpeckers and sparrowhawks, which breed throughout the year there.

The most common species of trees found growing within the wood are birch and oak. Ash and willow trees are found within the wood along with invasive species such as sycamore. As sycamore trees do not support as much wildlife as the native tree species, its presence is controlled.
