= Barnes integral =

Contour integral involving a product of gamma functions

In mathematics, a Barnes integral or Mellin–Barnes integral is a contour integral involving a product of gamma functions. They were introduced by Ernest William Barnes (1908, 1910). They are closely related to generalized hypergeometric series.

The integral is usually taken along a contour which is a deformation of the imaginary axis passing to the right of all poles of factors of the form Γ(a + s) and to the left of all poles of factors of the form Γ(a − s).

== Hypergeometric series ==
The hypergeometric function is given as a Barnes integral (Barnes 1908) by

$${}_2F_1(a,b;c;z) =\frac{\Gamma(c)}{\Gamma(a)\Gamma(b)} \frac{1}{2\pi i} \int_{-i\infty}^{i\infty} \frac{\Gamma(a+s)\Gamma(b+s)\Gamma(-s)}{\Gamma(c+s)}(-z)^s\,ds,$$

see also (Andrews, Askey & Roy 1999, Theorem 2.4.1). This equality can be obtained by moving the contour to the right while picking up the residues at s = 0, 1, 2, ... . for $z\ll 1$, and by analytic continuation elsewhere. Given proper convergence conditions, one can relate more general Barnes' integrals and generalized hypergeometric functions _{p}F_{q} in a similar way (Slater 1966).

== Barnes lemmas ==
The first Barnes lemma (Barnes 1908) states

$$\frac{1}{2\pi i} \int_{-i\infty}^{i\infty} \Gamma(a+s)\Gamma(b+s)\Gamma(c-s)\Gamma(d-s)ds
=\frac{\Gamma(a+c)\Gamma(a+d)\Gamma(b+c)\Gamma(b+d)}{\Gamma(a+b+c+d)}.$$

This is an analogue of Gauss's _{2}F_{1} summation formula, and also an extension of Euler's beta integral. The integral in it is sometimes called Barnes's beta integral.

The second Barnes lemma (Barnes 1910) states

$$\frac{1}{2\pi i} \int_{-i\infty}^{i\infty} \frac{\Gamma(a+s)\Gamma(b+s)\Gamma(c+s)\Gamma(1-d-s)\Gamma(-s)}{\Gamma(e+s)}ds$$

$$=\frac{\Gamma(a)\Gamma(b)\Gamma(c)\Gamma(1-d+a)\Gamma(1-d+b)\Gamma(1-d+c)}{\Gamma(e-a)\Gamma(e-b)\Gamma(e-c)}$$

where e = a + b + c − d + 1. This is an analogue of Saalschütz's summation formula.

== q-Barnes integrals ==
There are analogues of Barnes integrals for basic hypergeometric series, and many of the other results can also be extended to this case (Gasper & Rahman 2004, chapter 4).
