= Shard End Lake =

Artificial lake in Birmingham, England

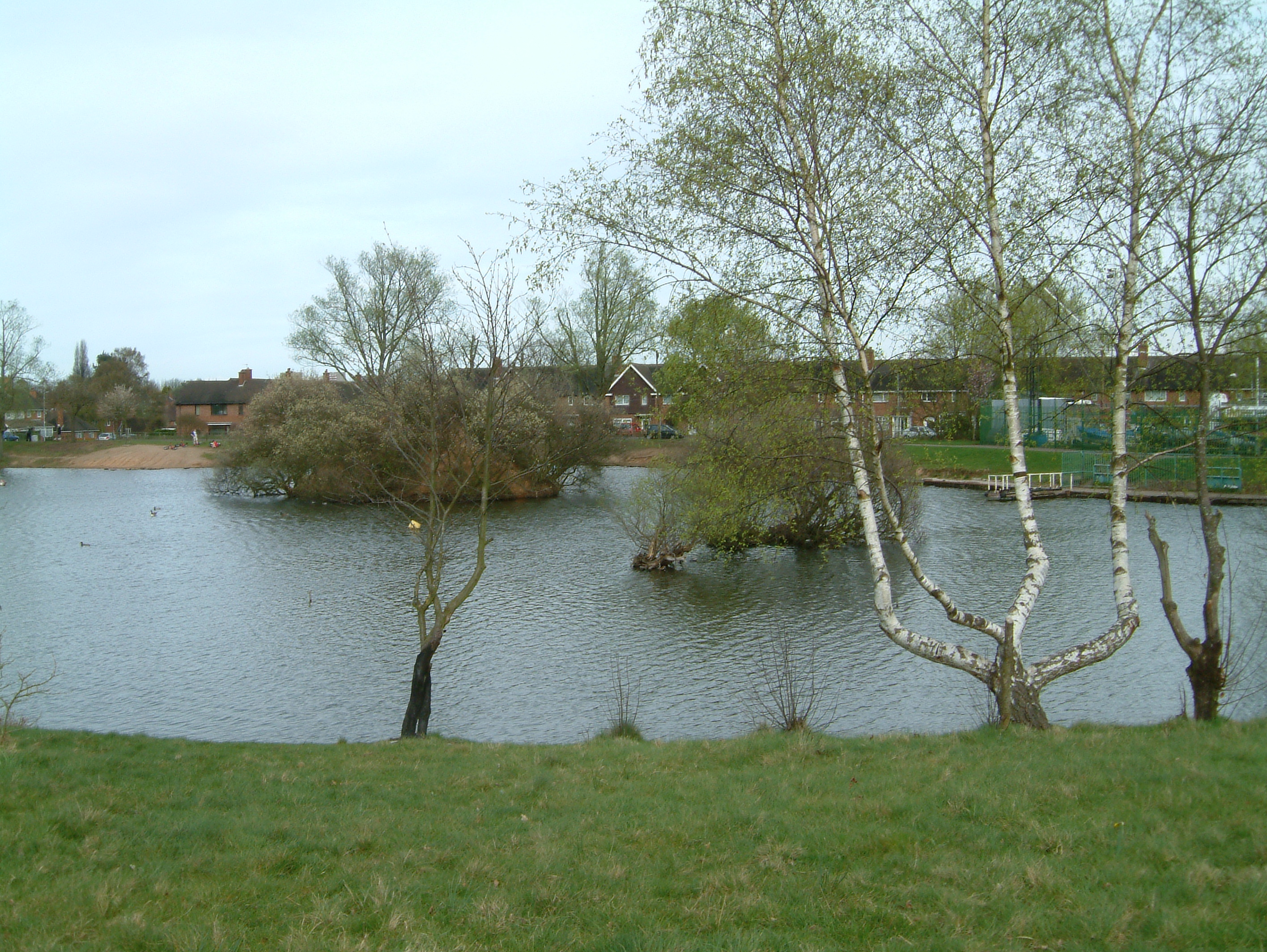

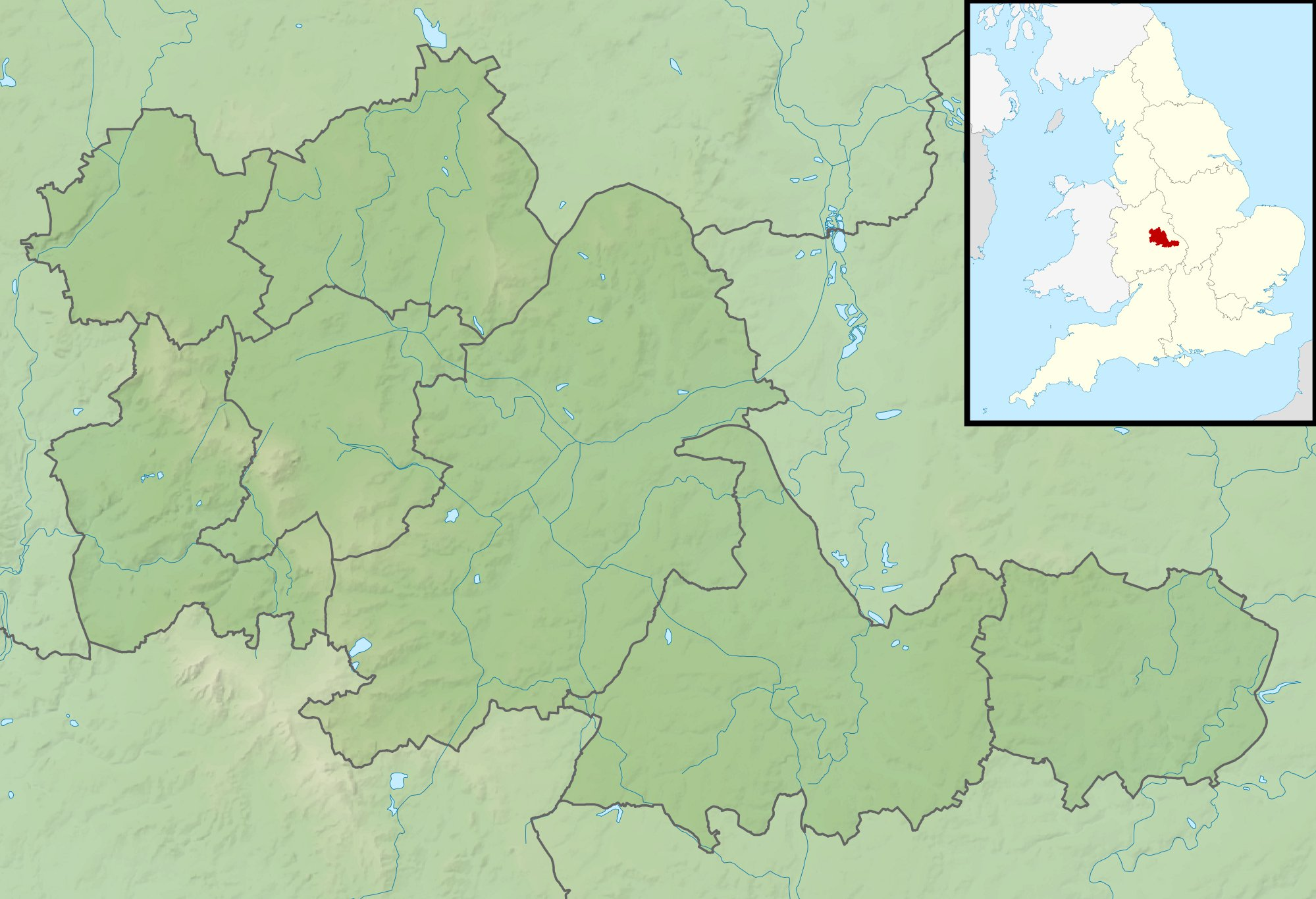
- Location within West Midlands county
- Location: Birmingham, West Midlands
- Coordinates: 52.4924°N 1.7716°W
- Type: Quarry
- Basin countries: England

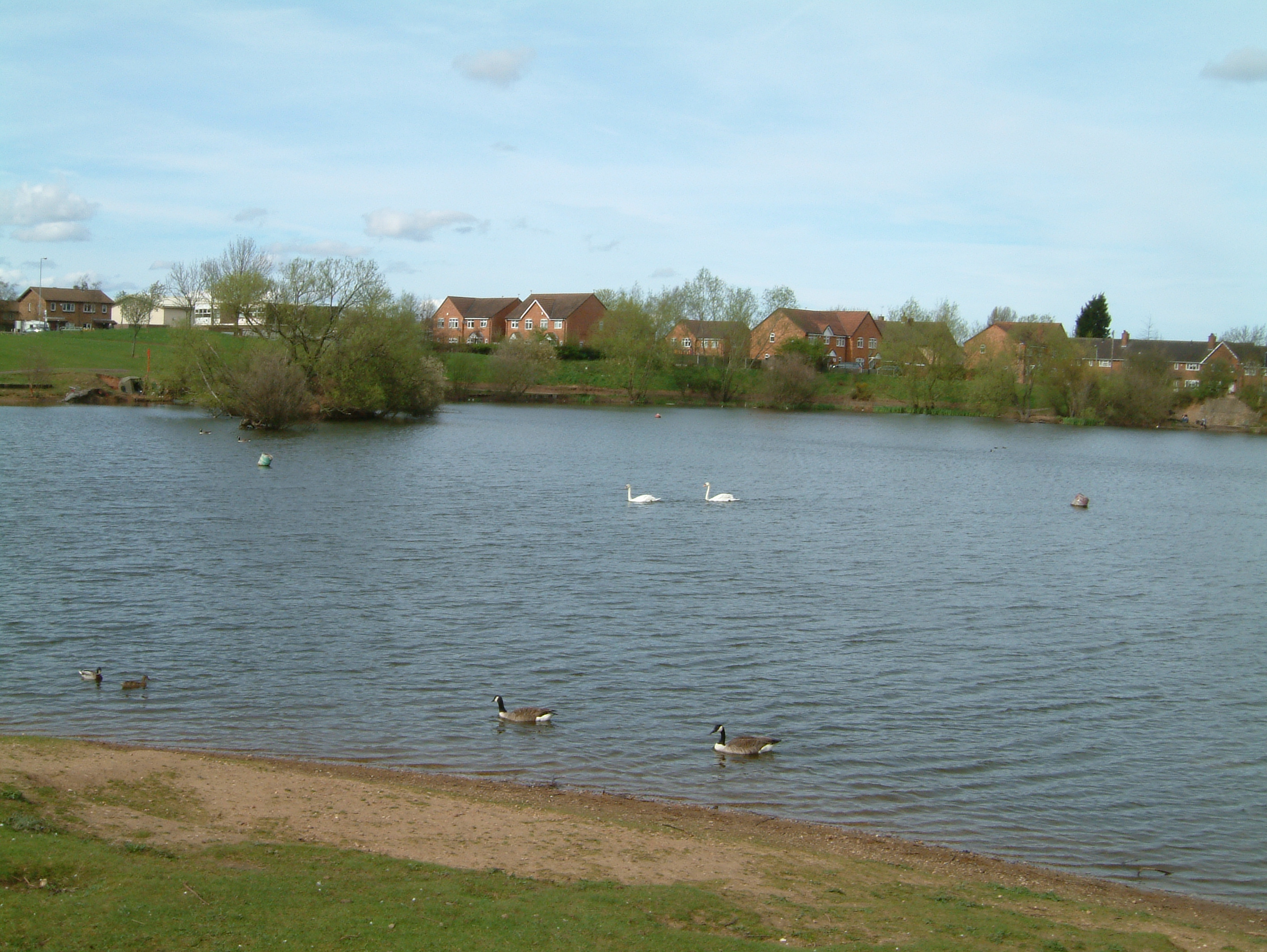

Shard End Lake is a man-made lake created out of a gravel quarry, it is managed by Kingfisher Country Park. Located in Birmingham, this lake holds a variety of silverfish including roach to 1 lb, perch to 2 lbs, bream and tench to 6 lbs, and carp and pike to 30 lbs.

The West Midlands Ghost Club has collected reports of a "top-hatted ghost" around the vicinity of the lake.
