= Diocese of Nagpur (Church of North India) =

Location
- Country: India

Information
- Denomination: Church of North India
- Rite: CNI
- Cathedral: All Saints' Cathedral, Nagpur

Current leadership
- Bishop: The Right Rev. Paranjyothy Sandela

The Diocese of Nagpur is an Anglican diocese of Church of North India headquartered in the city of Nagpur.

== Bishops ==
The Bishop of Nagpur was the Ordinary of the Anglican Diocese of Nagpur from its inception in 1903 until the foundation of the Church in India, Pakistan, Burma and Ceylon in 1927; and since then head of one of the united church's dioceses.

Tenure	Incumbent	Notes
1903–1926	Eyre Chatterton	(1863–1950)
1926–1937	Alex Wood, OBE	(born 1863)
1937–1949	Alexander Ogilvy Hardy	(born 1891)
1949–1954	George Sinker, MA	(1900–1986)
1954–1957	S. A. Pathak	Full name: Sadanand Appaji Pathak (1906–1957)
1957–1970	J. W. Sadiq	(born 1910)
1971–1984	Ramchandra Shivapa Bhandarre	bishop of Nagpur after the inauguration of the Church of North India.
1984–2000	Vinod Peter	died in a road accident.
10 June 2001	P.M. Dhotekar	Full name: Bishop Premkumar Moshe Dhotekar (2001–2003) Bishop Dhotekar and Bishop Nayak of Phulbani Diocese were unconstitutionally terminated from the episcopate as they attended the consecration ceremony of Metropolitan K.P. Yohannan of Believer's Church of India and laid hands on him to bless.
10 Sep 2004 to 2021	Paul Dupare	
c. 2021-2026	Andrew Rathore	
2026-	Paranjyothy Sandela	Bishop Sandela was consecrated in June 2026.

== See also ==
- Christianity in India
- Church of North India
