= Diocese of Chotanagpur =

The Diocese of Chotanagpur is the jurisdiction of the Church of North India (since 1970) under the episcopal leadership of the Bishop of Chotanagpur.

== See also ==
- Christianity in India
- Church of North India
