= Joanne Grenfell =

British bishop of the Church of England

The Right Reverend Joanne Grenfell
- Bishop of St Edmundsbury and Ipswich
- Diocese: Diocese of St Edmundsbury and Ipswich
- In office: 2025 to present
- Predecessor: Martin Seeley
- Other post: Lead bishop for safeguarding (2023–present)
- Previous posts: Archdeacon of Portsdown (2013–2019); Bishop of Stepney (2019–2025)

Orders
- Ordination: 2000 (deacon); 2001 (priest)
- Consecration: 3 July 2019 by Justin Welby

Personal details
- Born: 27 May 1972 (age 54)
- Denomination: Anglicanism
- Spouse: James (m. 1998)
- Children: 3
- Education: Oriel College, Oxford; University of British Columbia; Westcott House, Cambridge

Member of the House of Lords
- Lord Spiritual
- Bishop of St Edmundsbury and Ipswich; 5 February 2026

Joanne Woolway Grenfell (born 27 May 1972) is a British Anglican bishop. Since 2025, she has served as Bishop of St Edmundsbury and Ipswich in the Church of England; she had previously been Bishop of Stepney, an area bishop in the Diocese of London.

== Early life and education ==
Grenfell was born on 27 May 1972 in Enfield, Middlesex, England, to John and Christine Woolway. She was educated at Egglescliffe School, a comprehensive school in Eaglescliffe, County Durham. She studied at Oriel College, Oxford, graduating with a Bachelor of Arts (BA) degree in 1993. She then moved to Canada, where she studied English literature at the University of British Columbia: she graduated with a Master of Arts (MA) degree in 1994. She returned to Oriel to undertake a Doctor of Philosophy (DPhil) degree on the writing of Edmund Spenser. Her doctoral thesis was titled "Spenser and the culture of place", and her doctorate was awarded in 1997.

Grenfell was a lecturer in English Literature at Oriel College, Oxford, until 1998. She then trained for ordained ministry in the Church of England at Westcott House, Cambridge, from 1998 until 2000.

== Ordained ministry ==
She was ordained deacon (alongside her husband, James Grenfell) in Liverpool Cathedral, at Petertide (2 July) 2000, by John Packer, Bishop of Ripon and Leeds (who had been Bishop of Warrington until shortly beforehand). They were both ordained priest the following Trinity Sunday (10 June 2001) by James Jones, Bishop of Liverpool, at Liverpool Cathedral.

Following a curacy in Kirkby in the Diocese of Liverpool, she was appointed priest in charge in the Sheffield Manor ecumenical team ministry. Following this, she was a residentiary canon at Sheffield Cathedral, and Diocesan Director of Ordinands and Dean of Women's Ministry in the Diocese of Sheffield. She was installed as Archdeacon of Portsdown in the Diocese of Portsmouth during a service at Portsmouth Cathedral on 14 April 2013, serving until 2019.

=== Episcopal ministry ===
Her consecration as bishop, and start of her tenure as Bishop of Stepney, was on 3 July 2019 at St Paul's Cathedral; the principal consecrator was Justin Welby, Archbishop of Canterbury. From April 2023 until March 2026, she was also lead bishop for safeguarding and chair of the National Safeguarding Steering Group, having succeeded Jonathan Gibbs. Robert Springett succeeded Grenfell upon the completion of her three-year term in April 2026.

On 27 June 2025, it was announced that she would be the next Bishop of St Edmundsbury and Ipswich, in succession to Martin Seeley. She duly took up her See – taking over her diocese – at the confirmation of her election, in a ceremony held on 5 September 2025 at St Mary-le-Bow, London, and enthronement as the 12th bishop during a service at St Edmundsbury Cathedral, Bury St Edmunds on 24 January 2026.

She was introduced to the House of Lords as a Lord Spiritual on 5 February 2026.

=== Views ===
In November 2023, she was one of 44 Church of England bishops who signed an open letter supporting the use of the Prayers of Love and Faith (i.e. blessings for same-sex couples) and called for "Guidance being issued without delay that includes the removal of all restrictions on clergy entering same-sex civil marriages, and on bishops ordaining and licensing such clergy".

== Personal life ==
In 1998, she married James Grenfell, a fellow Anglican priest and chaplain. Together they have two sons and one daughter.

Church of England titles
Preceded by Trevor Reader	Archdeacon of Portsdown; 2013–2019	Succeeded by Jenny Rowley
Preceded by Adrian Newman	Bishop of Stepney; 2019–2025	Rod Green
Preceded by Martin Seeley	Bishop of St Edmundsbury and Ipswich; 2025–present	Incumbent
