= Archdeacons in the Diocese of Portsmouth =

Church of England ecclesiastical office

The archdeacons in the Diocese of Portsmouth are senior ecclesiastical officers in the Church of England in south-east Hampshire and the Isle of Wight. They currently include: the Archdeacon of the Meon, the Archdeacon of the Isle of Wight and the Archdeacon of Portsdown. Each one has responsibility over a geographical area within the diocese, providing organisational leadership and pastoral support to clergy within their area.

== History ==
The Anglican Diocese of Portsmouth was created on 1 May 1927 from the Diocese of Winchester's archdeaconries of the Isle of Wight and of Portsmouth, which had been created in that diocese on 22 December 1871 and 6 February 1925 respectively.

In November 1999, the Portsmouth archdeaconry was split in two: Lowson remained as Archdeacon of Portsdown and a new Archdeacon of the Meon was appointed.

== List of archdeacons ==
=== Archdeacons of the Isle of Wight ===
The archdeaconry was created in Winchester diocese, split from Winchester archdeaconry, in 1871.

- 1874–16 November 1886 (d.): Francis McDougall (also assistant bishop)
- 1886–7 September 1906 (d.): Henry Haigh
- 1906–2 February 1922 (d.): James Macarthur (also Bishop suffragan of Southampton until 1920; afterwards assistant bishop for the island)
- 1922–1928 (res.): Lewen Tugwell

Wight archdeaconry has been part of Portsmouth diocese since the latter's creation in 1927.

- 1929–1936 (ret.): Robert McKew
- 1937–31 August 1948 (d.): Hampton Weekes
- 1948–1952 (res.): Edward Roberts
- 1952–1961 (ret.): Alexander Cory (afterward archdeacon emeritus)
- 1961–1965 (res.): Geoffrey Tiarks
- 1965–1977 (res.): Ron Scruby
- 1977–1986 (res.): Freddie Carpenter (afterward archdeacon emeritus)
- 1986–1996 (ret.): Tony Turner (afterward archdeacon emeritus)
- 1996–2003 (ret.): Mervyn Banting (afterward archdeacon emeritus)
- 2003–2006 (res.): Trevor Reader
- 2006–2011 (res.): Caroline Baston
- 2011–2018 (res.): Peter Sutton
- 18 May 2019 – 2022 (res.): Peter Leonard
- 22 January 2023 – present: Steve Daughtery (also Vicar of Bembridge)

=== Archdeacons of Portsmouth ===
- 1925–1927 (res.): Neville Lovett
- 1927–1936 (res.): Harold Rodgers
- 1937–1945 (res.): Harold Hyde-Lees
- 1945–1952 (res.): Arthur Kitching (also an assistant bishop)
- 1952–1956 (res.): Edward Roberts
- 1956–1964 (res.): Michael Peck
- 1965–1969 (res.): Geoffrey Tiarks
- 1969–1977 (ret.): Christopher Prior (afterwards archdeacon emeritus)
- 1977–1985 (ret.): Ron Scruby (afterwards archdeacon emeritus)
- 1985–1993 (ret.): Norman Crowder (afterwards archdeacon emeritus)
- 1993–1999 (res.): Graeme Knowles
- February – November 1999: Chris Lowson (became Archdeacon of Portsdown)

In November 1999, the archdeaconry of Portsmouth was split into Portsdown and the Meon.

=== Archdeacons of Portsdown ===
- November 1999–2006: Chris Lowson (previously Archdeacon of Portsmouth)
- 2006–2013 (ret.): Trevor Reader
- 14 April 2013 – 3 July 2019 (res.): Joanne Grenfell (became Bishop of Stepney)
- 3 July 2019 – 2020: vacant
- 2020 – 31 January 2024 (res.): Jenny Rowley
- 7 September 2025 – present: Bob White

=== Archdeacons of the Meon ===
- 1999–2010 (res.): Peter Hancock
- 11 September 2011 – 28 January 2021: Gavin Collins
- 28 January 2021 – 2 July 2023 (Acting): Will Hughes
- 2 July 2023 – present: Kathryn Percival
