= Graeme Knowles =

British Anglican bishop (born 1951)

The Right Reverend Graeme Knowles CVO OStJ
- Dean of St Paul's
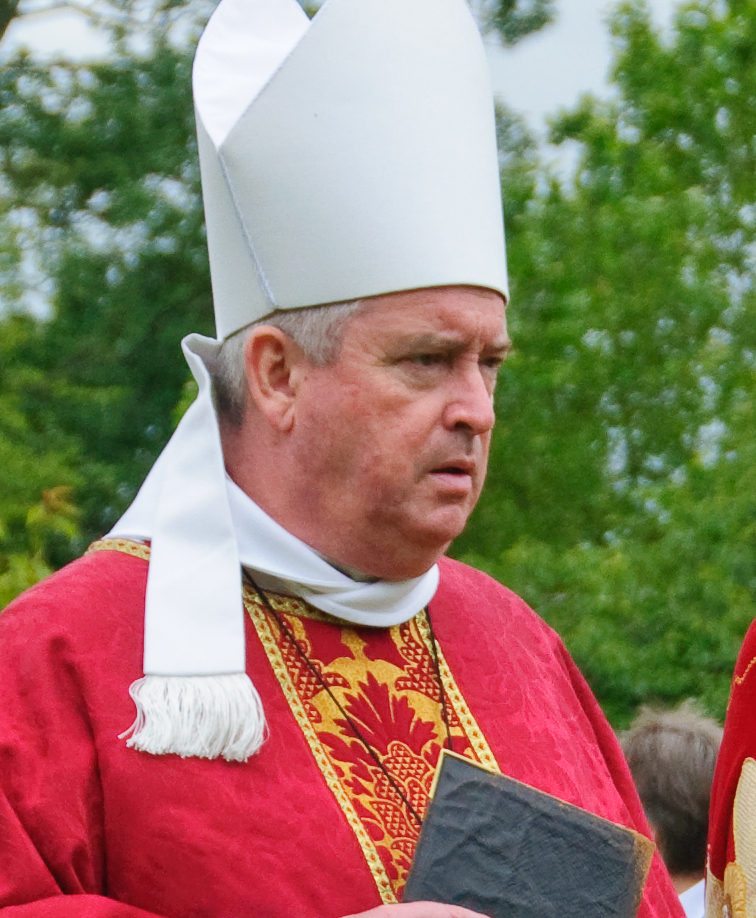
- Knowles in 2009
- Church: Church of England
- Diocese: Diocese of London
- In office: 2007–2011
- Predecessor: John Moses
- Successor: David Ison
- Other post: Acting Bishop of St Edmundsbury and Ipswich (2025)
- Previous posts: Acting Dean of St Edmundsbury (2017–2018); Bishop of Sodor and Man (2003–2007); Dean of Carlisle (1999–2003); Archdeacon of Portsmouth (1993–1999)

Orders
- Ordination: 1974 (deacon); 1975 (priest)
- Consecration: 4 December 2003

Personal details
- Born: 25 September 1951 (age 75) Woburn, Bedfordshire
- Denomination: Anglican
- Parents: Stan & Grace
- Spouse: Susan
- Education: King's College London

Graeme Paul Knowles CVO, OStJ (born 25 September 1951) is a retired Anglican bishop who served as Acting Bishop of St Edmundsbury and Ipswich in 2025. He served latterly as the Acting Dean of St Edmundsbury, having previously served as Bishop of Sodor and Man and as Dean of St Paul's.

== Biography ==
Knowles was educated at Dunstable Grammar School and King's College London, spending his final year of theological studies at St Augustine's College, Canterbury.

Knowles served a curacy at St Peter-in-Thanet in Broadstairs, Kent from 1974 to 1979. From 1979 he was precentor and senior curate of Leeds Parish Church before moving to become precentor and a canon residentiary at Portsmouth Cathedral in 1981. He was also a chaplain during his time at the cathedral and held the post of chapter clerk from 1985 to 1987. He became the vicar of Leigh Park in 1987, additionally taking on the role of Rural Dean of Havant from 1990. He was appointed Archdeacon of Portsmouth in 1993 and held the post until 1999.

Knowles was Dean of Carlisle from 1999 until he moved to the Isle of Man as Bishop of Sodor and Man in 2003, replacing Noël Jones. He was consecrated a bishop by David Hope, Archbishop of York at York Minster on 4 December 2003 and installed at Peel Cathedral on 17 January 2004. He became Dean of St Paul's in 2007 in succession to John Moses who retired in 2006.

Knowles was installed as Dean of St Paul's Cathedral, London on 1 October 2007 after Letters Patent were issued on 20 September 2007. He resigned from St Paul's on 1 November 2011 as a result of the reactions to the Chapter's resolution to evict the Occupy London protesters from cathedral land.

Knowles is also an honorary chaplain in the Royal Naval Reserve and a patron of the Burgon Society.

After leaving St Paul's, Knowles retired to Bury St Edmunds, where he was licensed as an honorary assistant bishop and appointed registrar of Sons of the Clergy, a charity supporting the families of Anglican clergy.

On 11 January 2023, Knowles was installed as Acting Dean of Chichester following the departure of Stephen Waine. The Diocese of Chichester had earlier announced that Knowles would take up the role until April 2023.

Following Martin Seeley's retirement (there being no Bishop of Dunwich), Knowles is Acting Bishop of St Edmundsbury and Ipswich.

== Styles ==
- The Reverend Graeme Knowles (1974–1981)
- The Venerable Graeme Knowles (1993–1999)
- The Very Reverend Graeme Knowles (1999–2003)
- The Right Reverend Graeme Knowles (2003–2012)
- The Right Reverend Graeme Knowles CVO (2012–present)

Church of England titles
Preceded by Norman Crowder	Archdeacon of Portsmouth; 1993–1999	Succeeded by Christopher Lowson
Preceded by Henry Stapleton	Dean of Carlisle; 1999–2003	Succeeded by Mark Boyling
Preceded by Noël Jones	Bishop of Sodor and Man; 2003–2007	Succeeded by Robert Paterson
Preceded by John Moses	Dean of St Paul's; 2007–2011	Succeeded by David Ison
