= St Peter's Church, West Harrow =

Coordinates: 51.5770°N 0.3507°W

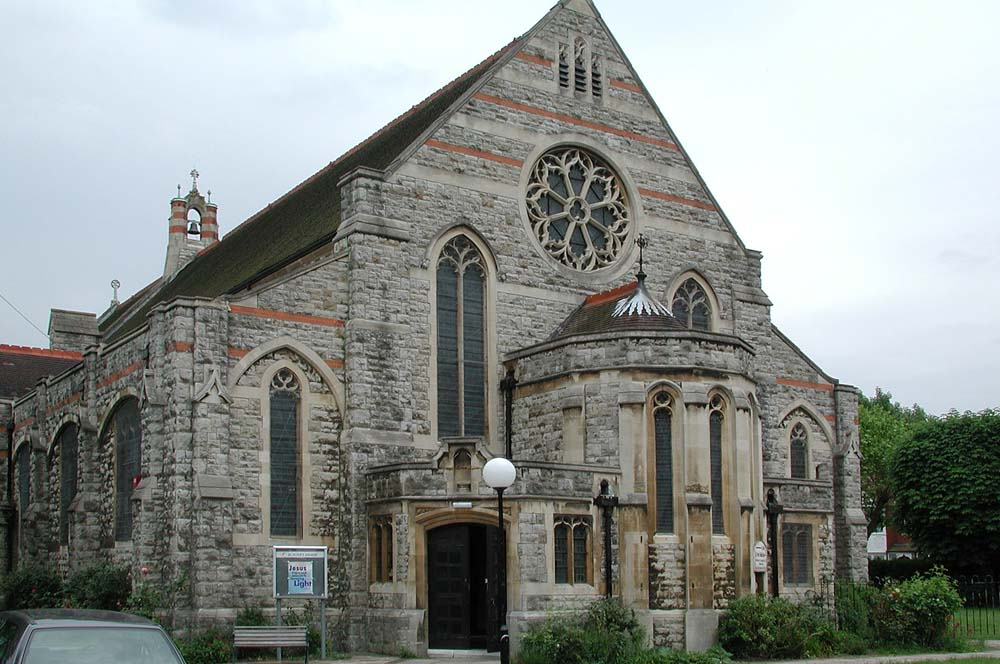
- The exterior of the church
- St Peter's Church, West Harrow
- OS grid reference: TQ 14382 87746
- Address: St Peter’s Church Sumner Road, Harrow, Middlesex HA1 4BX
- Country: England
- Denomination: Anglican
- Website: www.stpetersharrow.org

History
- Consecrated: 1913

Administration
- Diocese: London

Clergy
- Vicar: Jon Lindsay-Scott

St Peter's Church is a grade II listed Anglican church in the West Harrow area of the London Borough of Harrow, in the Diocese of London.

== History ==
The founding stone of St Peter's was laid on 14 October 1911 and the church was consecrated on 1 April 1913. The church was grade II listed on 19 December 1980, but then closed in 1982 due to falling parishioner numbers. However, the church re-opened in 1989 following a campaign by local residents. This coincided with a refurbishment of the building, including a new floor by Ian Goldsmid.

In 2014, Rod Green became vicar of St Peter's, before going on to become Bishop of Stepney in 2026. The current vicar is Jon Lindsay-Scott.

== Architecture ==
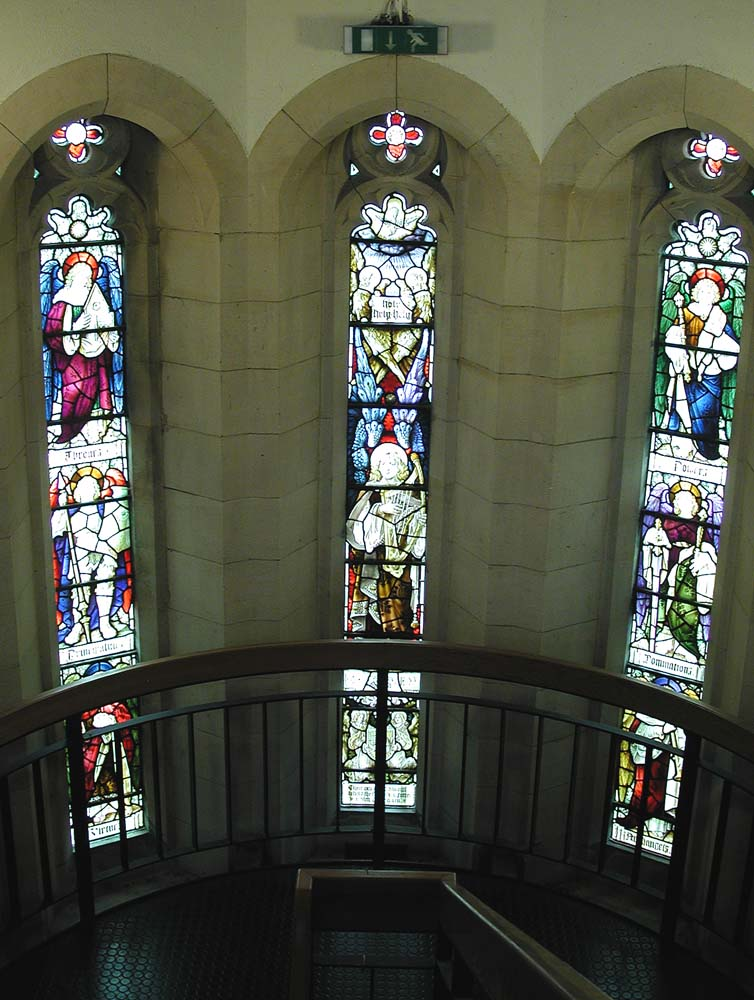
The stained glass windows, photographed from inside the church

The church was designed by G.H. Fellowes Prynne and built of ragstone. It was originally intended that a spire be incorporated into the design, but this was not built into the final design. The baptistry and lady chapel are built with stained glass windows, but all other windows are coloured glass in the arts and crafts style. An opus sectile reredos was built for the lady chapel in 1920.
