= Peter Leonard =

Peter Leonard may refer to:

- Peter Leonard (journalist) (1942–2008), Australian journalist and newsreader
- Peter Leonard (author), American author of crime novels
- Peter Leonard (footballer), Scottish footballer
- Peter Leonard (priest) (born 1970), Archdeacon of the Isle of Wight since 2019
