= David Hope, Baron Hope of Thornes =

Archbishop of York from 1995 to 2005

The Most Reverend and Right Honourable David Hope KCVO PC
- Archbishop of York
- Church: Church of England
- Diocese: York
- In office: 1995–2005
- Predecessor: John Habgood
- Successor: John Sentamu
- Other posts: Bishop of London (1991–1995); Bishop of Wakefield (1985–1991)

Orders
- Ordination: 1965 (deacon); 1967 (priest)
- Consecration: 18 October 1985 by John Habgood

Personal details
- Born: David Michael Hope; 14 April 1940 (age 86)
- Denomination: Anglicanism
- Education: University of Nottingham; Linacre College, Oxford; St Stephen's House, Oxford

Member of the House of Lords
- Lord Temporal
- Life peerage 4 April 2005 – 30 April 2015
- Lord Spiritual
- Ex officio as Archbishop of York; 29 January 1996 – 28 February 2005
- Ex officio as Bishop of London; 27 November 1991 – 29 January 1996
- Bishop of Wakefield; 19 December 1990 – 27 November 1991

David Michael Hope, Baron Hope of Thornes (born 14 April 1940), is a British retired Anglican bishop. He was the Bishop of Wakefield between 1985 and 1991 and the Bishop of London between 1991 and 1995. From 1995 to 2005, he was the Archbishop of York in the Church of England. In March 2005, he was made a life peer and therefore a member of the House of Lords; he had already sat in the house as a Lord Spiritual when he was a bishop. He retired from the Lords in April 2015.

== Early life and education ==
Hope was born on 14 April 1940. He studied theology at the University of Nottingham, graduating with a Bachelor of Arts (BA) degree. He then entered St Stephen's House, Oxford to train for ordination, and also undertook postgraduate study at Linacre College, Oxford, being awarded a Doctor of Philosophy (DPhil) degree in 1965. His doctoral thesis was titled "The Leonine Sacramentary: a re-assessment of its nature and purpose".

== Early career ==
Hope was ordained deacon in 1965 and priest in 1967. After a curacy at the Church of Saint John the Baptist, Liverpool he was Vicar of Orford from 1970 to 1973. In that year he became Principal of St Stephen's House, an Anglo-Catholic theological college in Oxford, from 1974 until 1982. He was Vicar of All Saints, Margaret Street, an Anglo-Catholic church in the West End of London from 1982 to 1985.

Hope was nominated to become Bishop of Wakefield on 2 July 1985, consecrated as a bishop by John Habgood, Archbishop of York, on 18 October at York Minster and enthroned at Wakefield Cathedral on 29 October. He was translated to become Bishop of London with the confirmation of his election to that See on 2 July 1991 and enthroned at St Paul's Cathedral on 14 September. Hope was Master of the Guardians of the Shrine of Our Lady of Walsingham from 1982 to 1994.

== Archbishop of York ==
Having become Archbishop of York with the confirmation of his election at Lambeth Palace in September/October 1995, Hope was enthroned at York Minster on 8 December 1995. After Peter Tatchell alleged in the same year that Hope was gay as part of a much criticised OutRage! "outing" campaign, Hope had said that his sexuality is "a grey area". "He said that his sexuality was 'ambiguous' and that he was celibate." On 26 October 1995 he was appointed a Knight Commander of the Royal Victorian Order (KCVO), an honour in the personal gift of the Queen. Hope was one of four English bishops who declined to sign the Cambridge Accord, an attempt in 1999 to find agreement on affirming certain human rights of homosexuals, notwithstanding differences within the church on the morality of homosexual behaviour. On 30 June 2004, together with Rowan Williams, Archbishop of Canterbury, and on behalf of all 114 Anglican bishops, he wrote to Tony Blair expressing deep concern about government policy and criticising the coalition troops' conduct in Iraq. The letter cited the abuse of Iraqi detainees, which was described as having been "deeply damaging", and stated that the government's apparent double standards "diminish the credibility of western governments". Hope conducted a series of disciplinary hearings involving errant clergy within his province.

On 1 August 2004 it was announced that Hope would step down as Archbishop of York to become a parish priest at St Margaret's Church in Ilkley, West Yorkshire. He did so on 28 February 2005.

== Later years ==
In recognition of his contribution to the church, Downing Street announced on 25 January 2005 that Hope was to be created a life peer; the title was gazetted as Baron Hope of Thornes, of Thornes in the County of West Yorkshire, on 6 April 2005 (dated 31 March 2005). On 4 August 2006 he was appointed to the Court of Ecclesiastical Causes Reserved for a period of five years. On 10 September 2006, Hope announced his resignation as Vicar of St Margaret's, Ilkley, owing to ill health. He stated that he intended to continue to work a three-day week at St Margaret's until the end of 2006, but after that would serve as an honorary assistant bishop in the Diocese of Bradford (and later in the successor Diocese of Leeds.) On 1 October 2007 it was announced that he would also serve as an honorary assistant bishop in the Diocese of Gibraltar in Europe; that licence lapsed in 2012. Hope has also been an honorary assistant bishop in the Diocese of Blackburn since 2008.

In April 2013, it was reported that in 1999 and 2003, Hope had been made aware of allegations of child sexual abuse against a former Dean of Manchester, Robert Waddington. Hope removed Waddington's right to officiate at services but did not refer Waddington to the authorities because of his ill health. Following the 2014 report of the Cahill Inquiry, Hope resigned his post as honorary assistant bishop in the Diocese of West Yorkshire and the Dales on 27 October 2014. He retired from the House of Lords on 30 April 2015.

He was present at the Accession Council which proclaimed King Charles III as Monarch on 10 September 2022.

== Styles and titles ==
- Doctor David Hope (1965)
- The Reverend Doctor David Hope (1965–1985)
- The Right Reverend Doctor David Hope (1985–1991)
- The Right Reverend and Right Honourable Doctor David Hope (1991–1995)
- The Most Reverend and Right Honourable Doctor David Hope KCVO (1995 – 28 February 2005)
- The Right Reverend and Right Honourable Doctor David Hope KCVO (28 February – 31 March 2005)
- The Right Reverend and Right Honourable The Lord Hope of Thornes KCVO PC (31 March 2005 – present)

Church of England titles
Preceded by Colin James	Bishop of Wakefield; 1985–1991	Succeeded by Nigel McCulloch
Preceded by Graham Leonard	Bishop of London; 1991–1995	Succeeded by Richard Chartres
Preceded by John Habgood	Archbishop of York; 1995–2005	Succeeded by John Sentamu
Academic offices
Preceded by Derek Allen	Principal of St Stephen's House, Oxford; 1974–1982	Succeeded by David Thomas
