= Scruby =

Scruby may refer to:

- Jack Scruby (1916-1988), manufacturer
- Jacqui Scruby, Australian politician
- Ron Scruby (1919-2011), Anglican priest and archdeacon
