= Christopher Prior =

Christopher Prior, CB (2 July 1912 – 14 September 2004) was an eminent Anglican priest: Chaplain of the Fleet from 1966 to 1969 and Archdeacon of Portsmouth from then to 1977.

Born on 2 July 1912, he was educated at Keble College, Oxford. He was ordained after a period of study at Ripon College Cuddesdon and began his ecclesiastical career as a Curate at Hornsea. In 1941 he became a Royal Naval Chaplain in 1941, eventually becoming Chaplain of the Fleet in 1966. After this he became Archdeacon of Portsmouth. He retired in 1977 and died on 14 September 2004.

Church of England titles
Preceded by Raymond William Richardson	Chaplain of the Fleet; February 1966 – November 1969	Succeeded by Ambrose Walter Marcus Weekes
Preceded by Geoffrey Lewis Tiarks	Archdeacon of Portsmouth; February 1969 – November 1977	Succeeded by Ronald Victor Scruby
