= Alexander Cory =

The Venerable Alexander Cory was Archdeacon of the Isle of Wight.

Born into an ecclesiastical family on 19 March 1890, he was educated at St John's School, Leatherhead, Keble College, Oxford and Ripon College Cuddesdon he was ordained in 1914. After a curacy at Portsea he was a World War I temporary Chaplain to the Forces. He was Rector of Burton Overy from 1919 to 1923 and then Vicar of St Mary's, Far Cotton until 1928. After that he was Vicar of Fareham for a decade then the incumbent at Hayling Island until 1946. Moving to the Isle of Wight he was Vicar of All Saints, Ryde from 1946 to 1952 when he became Archdeacon of the whole island

He died on 7 April 1973

== Notes ==
Church of England titles
| Preceded by Edward James Keymer Roberts | Archdeacon of the Isle of Wight; July 1952– November 1961 | Succeeded by Geoffrey Lewis Tiarks |
