= St Maurice's Church, Winchester =

St Maurice’s Church, Winchester
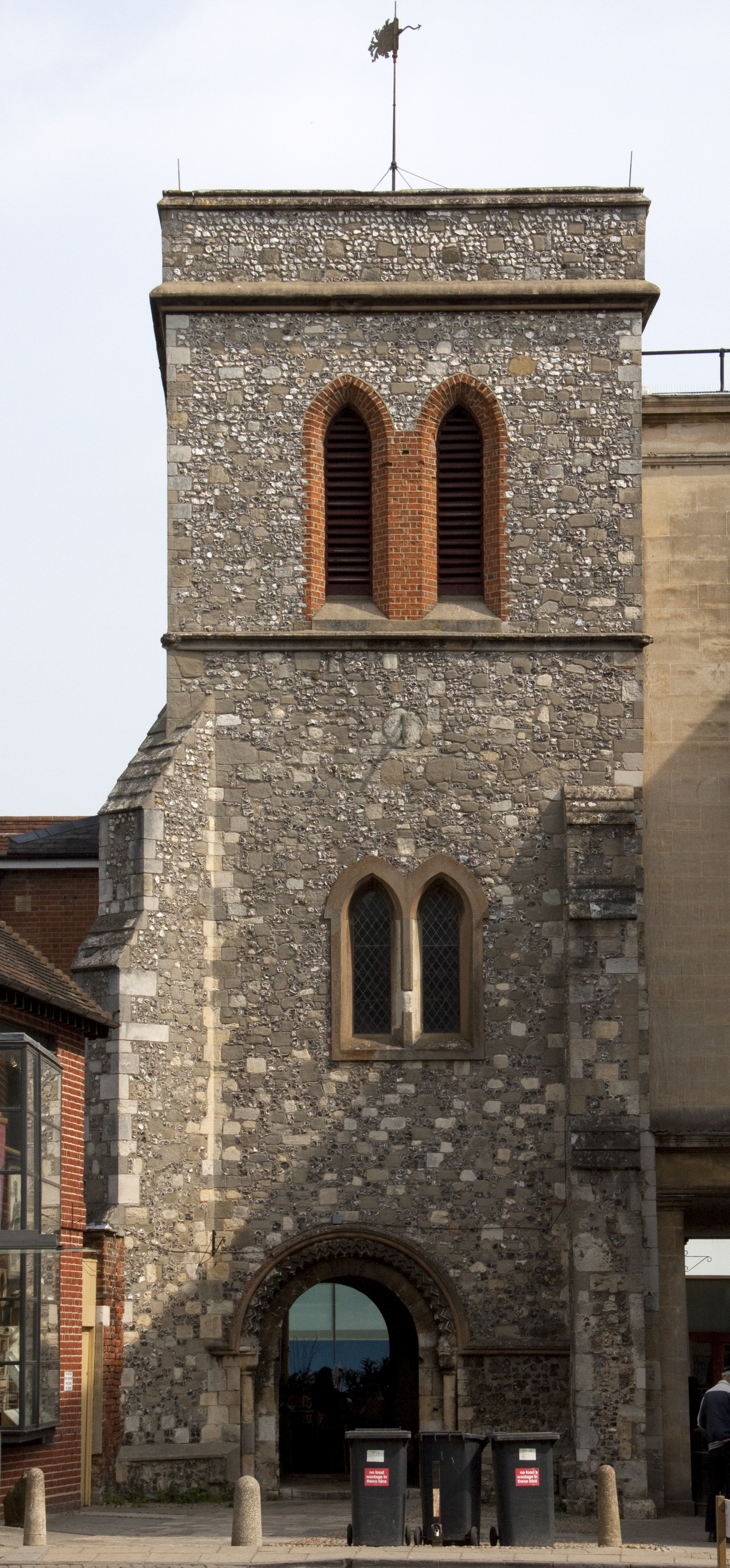
- Tower of St Maurice’s Church, Winchester
- St Maurice’s Church, Winchester
- 51°03′43″N 1°18′46″W
- OS grid reference: SU 48265 29400
- Location: Winchester
- Country: England
- Denomination: Church of England

History
- Dedication: Saint Maurice

Architecture
- Heritage designation: Grade II listed

Administration
- Province: Province of Canterbury
- Diocese: Diocese of Winchester

St Maurice's Church, Winchester was a parish church in the Church of England in Winchester, Hampshire.

The parish was united with that of St Mary Kalendar and the old church was taken down in March 1840, rebuilt to designs by the architect William Gover of Winchester, and reopened on 21 July 1842, when it was consecrated by the Bishop of Winchester.

The body of the church was taken down in the late 1950s. The only remains are the 15th-century tower, built of flint and rubble and incorporating a Norman arch, which is Grade II listed. The tower also displays a sundial and the arms of King George III.

== Organ ==
The church contained a pipe organ dating from 1756 by Father Smith. When the church closed this was moved to St Thomas' Church, Southgate Street, and when that church closed, it moved again to St Denys Church, Portswood, Southampton. A specification of the organ can be found on the National Pipe Organ Register.

== Bells ==
The tower contained six bells at the time the church was closed.

Until 1919 they were a ring of five, however during that year the bells were taken to Gillett and Johnston of Croydon, had their canons removed and a treble added to give six bells. These were taken out and in 1957, were given to the Church of the Ascension, Bitterne Park, Southampton, where they were augmented to eight with the addition of two trebles and the tenor being recast by Mears and Stainbank.

In 2008 they were augmented to twelve with the addition of four trebles, all cast by Hayward Mills Associates, making them the world's lightest ring of twelve bells hung in a church. (Note: There are several other lighter peals of twelve "Dove Web search". dove.cccbr.org.uk., however Bitterne Park's are the lightest to be located in a church.)

== Rectors ==
In 1682 Isaac Jones was appointed first Rector of the joint parish of St Maurice with St Mary Kalendre.

- 1560 Jes Cunth or Cout
- 1584 Mr. James
- 1591 Parson Dithey or Disley
- 1591 Thomas Stempe
- 1594 Mr. Jones
- 1607 Thomas Stempe
- 1608 Mr. Newby
- 1609 Mr. Munday
- 1644 William Clunn
- 1675 Joseph Masters
- 1682 Isaac Jones
- 1704 Richard Barker
- 1718 William Jefferies
- 1719 Cornelius Norwood
- 1721 Daniel Wavell
- 1738 Thomas Ridding
- 1741 Richard Wavell (son of Daniel)
- 1779 James Monk Newbolt
- 1803 George L Armstrong
- 1819 Henry John Hopkins
- 1838 William Nicholson
- 1845 Thomas Woodroffe
- 1854 William Cornes
- 1861 Henry Brougham Bousfield
- 1870 Henry Haigh
- 1883 James Henerille Thresher
- 1893 Alfred Cecil Dicker
- 1906 Walter Edmund Colchester
- 1923 Charles Fanshawe
- 1925 Sidney Montague Watson
- 1947 Charles Oswald Rockett
- 1950 Bernard Cunningham Corfield
