= Bishop of St Edmundsbury and Ipswich =

Diocesan bishop in the Church of England

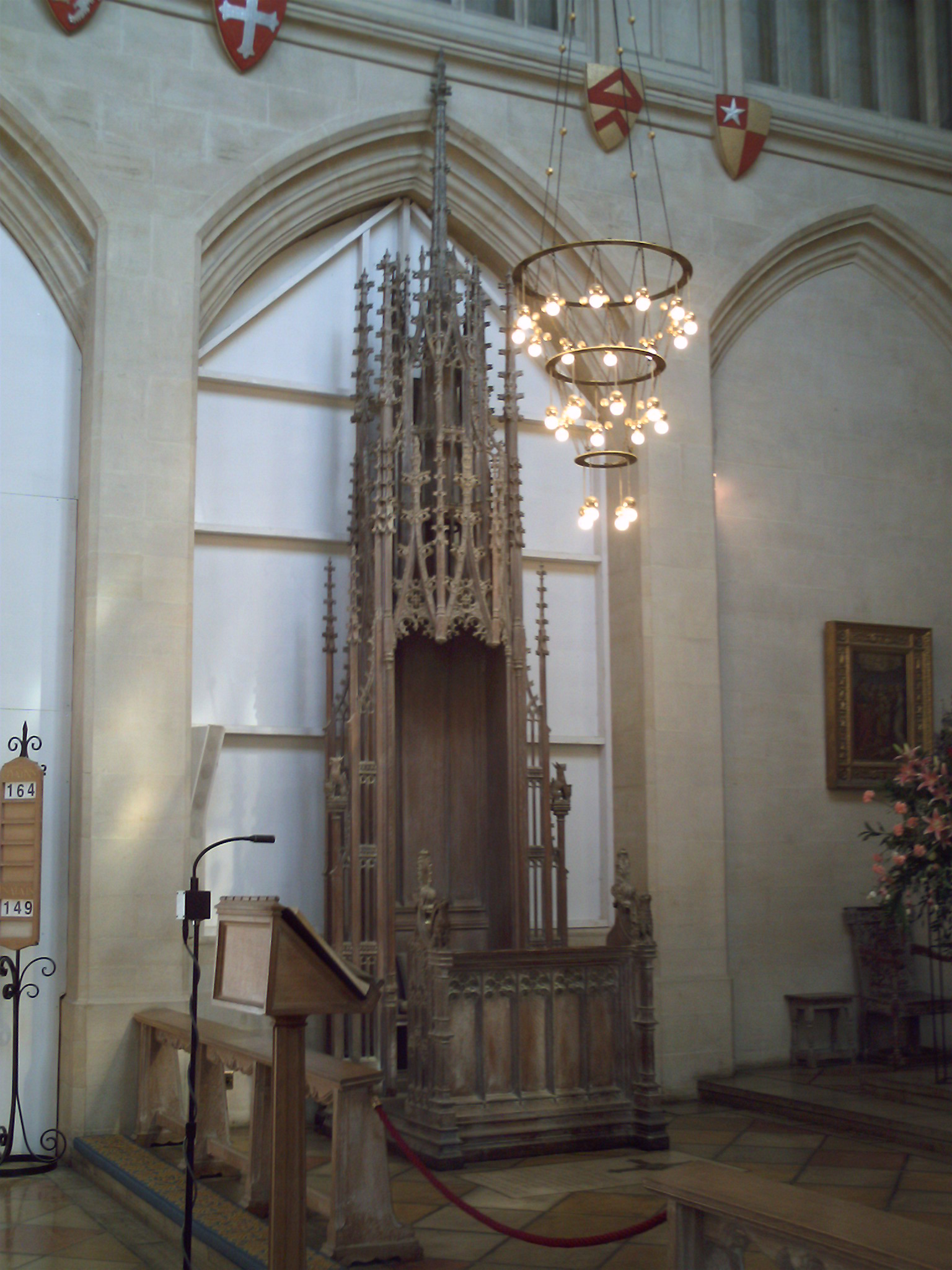
Seat of the Bishop of St Edmundsbury and Ipswich in the Cathedral Church of Saint James, Bury St Edmunds

The Bishop of St Edmundsbury and Ipswich is the Ordinary of the Church of England's Diocese of St Edmundsbury and Ipswich in the Province of Canterbury.

The current bishop is Joanne Grenfell, since the confirmation on 5 September 2025 of her election. The Bishop's residence is the Bishop's House, Ipswich — a little to the north of the town centre.

== History ==
Under the Suffragan Bishops Act 1534, the title Bishop of Ipswich was created in 1536, but it fell into abeyance following the first holder surrendering the office in 1538. In 1899, the title was revived with two suffragan bishops of Ipswich appointed to assist the diocesan bishop of Norwich. Through reorganisation in the Church of England, the Diocese of Saint Edmundsbury and Ipswich was established by Act of Parliament in 1913 under King George V. The bishop's and the diocesan offices are located in Ipswich, while the bishop's seat is located at St Edmundsbury Cathedral in Bury St Edmunds. Since 1934, the bishops of St Edmundsbury and Ipswich have been assisted by the suffragan bishops of Dunwich in overseeing the diocese.

== List of bishops ==
Bishops of St Edmundsbury and Ipswich
From	Until	Incumbent	Notes
1914	1921	Henry Hodgson, DD	Nominated on 18 February, consecrated on 24 February, and enthroned in March 1914. Died in office on 28 February 1921.
1921	1923	Albert David	Nominated on 21 January and consecrated on 25 July 1921. Translated to Liverpool on 18 October 1923.
1923	1940	Walter Whittingham, DD, MA	Nominated on 22 October and consecrated on 1 November 1923. Resigned on 31 August 1940 and died on 17 June 1941.
1940	1953	Richard Brook, DD	Nominated on 24 September and consecrated on 1 November 1940. Resigned on 1 October 1953 and died on 31 January 1969.
1954	1965	Arthur Morris, DD	Translated from Pontefract. Nominated on 4 May and confirmed on 2 June 1954. Resigned on 31 December 1965 and died on 15 October 1977.
1966	1978	Leslie Brown, CBE, DD	Previously Archbishop of Uganda. Nominated on 25 January and confirmed on 25 March 1966. Resigned on 30 September 1978 and died on 27 December 1999.
1978	1986	John Waine, KCVO, BA	Translated from Stafford. Nominated on 23 October and confirmed on 21 November 1978. Translated to Chelmsford in 1986.
1986	1996	John Dennis	Father of the British comedian Hugh Dennis. Translated from Knaresborough. Nominated and confirmed in 1986. Retired in 1996.
1997	2007	Richard Lewis	Translated from Taunton. Nominated and confirmed in 1997. Retired in June 2007.
2007	2013	Nigel Stock, BA, DipTh	Translated from Stockport. Nominated and confirmed in 2007.
20 October 2013	7 May 2015	David Thomson (acting)	Bishop suffragan of Huntingdon (Ely)
7 May 2015	28 February 2025	Martin Seeley	Previously Principal of Westcott House, Cambridge. Nominated on 20 November 2014; election confirmed 7 May 2015; retired 28 February 2025.
1 March 2025	acting	Graeme Knowles, acting bishop	Acting bishop during vacancy; former Bishop of Sodor and Man.
2025	present	Joanne Grenfell	Translated from Stepney: nominated June 2025 and confirmed 5 September 2025.

== Assistant bishops ==
Among those who have served the diocese as assistant bishops have been:

- in 1921, Cecil Wood, Rector of Witnesham and former Bishop of Melanesia, served as archbishop's commissary (i.e. acting diocesan bishop)
- 1931–1934: Maxwell Maxwell-Gumbleton, Archdeacon of Sudbury from 1932 and former Bishop of Ballarat, became first Bishop suffragan of Dunwich

== Bibliography ==
- Crockford's Clerical Directory (100th ed.). London: Church House Publishing. 2007. ISBN 978-0-7151-1030-0.
- Fryde, E. B.; Greenway, D. E.; Porter, S.; Roy, I., eds. (1986). Handbook of British Chronology (3rd, reprinted 2003 ed.). Cambridge: Cambridge University Press. ISBN 0-521-56350-X.
