= Freddie Carpenter =

British archdeacon

Frederick Charles Carpenter (24 February 1920 – 19 February 2003) was an Archdeacon of the Isle of Wight.

Born on 24 February 1920, Carpenter was educated at Sir George Monoux Grammar School and Sidney Sussex College, Cambridge. After World War II service with the Royal Signals he was ordained in 1950. He was an Assistant Master and Chaplain at Sherborne School until 1962. He was Vicar of St Mary's Church, Moseley from then until 1968 when he became a Canon Residentiary of Portsmouth Cathedral and Director of Religious Education for the Diocese, posts he held until his island appointment.

== Death ==
Carpenter died on 19 February 2003.

Church of England titles
Preceded by Ronald Victor Scruby	Archdeacon of the Isle of Wight; February 1977– November 1986	Succeeded by Antony Hubert Michael Turner
