= Ron Scruby =

Ronald Victor Scruby (known as Ron; 23 December 1919 – 31 January 2011) was an eminent Anglican priest: Archdeacon of the Isle of Wight, then Archdeacon of Portsmouth.

Born in Southall on 23 December 1919, he was educated at Trinity Hall, Cambridge. After World War II service with the Royal Engineers he entered Ripon College Cuddesdon and ordained in 1949. He was an Assistant Curate at Rogate from 1950 to 1953 and then Chaplain at Saunders-Roe, East Cowes until 1958. He was Vicar of Eastney and then Rural Dean of Portsmouth until his appointment to the Isle of Wight in 1965. After twelve years he became Archdeacon of Portsmouth.

He retired in 1986 and died on 31 January 2011.

== Notes ==
Church of England titles
| Preceded by Geoffrey Lewis Tiarks | Archdeacon of the Isle of Wight; February 1965 – November 1977 | Succeeded by Frederick Charles Carpenter |
| Preceded by Christopher Prior | Archdeacon of Portsmouth; 1977–1985 | Succeeded by Norman Harry Crowder |
