= Trevor Reader =

Trevor Alan John Reader is a retired Anglican priest: he was Archdeacon of Portsdown from 2006 until 2013.

Born in Pembrokeshire, Wales on 3 August 1946, he was educated at Portsmouth Polytechnic. He was a Research assistant then a Lecturer there until 1986; after which he studied for ordination at Salisbury and Wells Theological College. He was an Assistant Curate at St Mary, Alverstoke from 1986 to 1989 and then Priest in charge at St Mary, Hook-with-Warsash until 1998. He was Priest in charge of Holy Trinity, Blendworth, with St Michael and all Angels, Chalton with St Hubert, Idsworth and Diocesan Director of Non-Stipendiary Ministry until 2003 when he became Archdeacon of the Isle of Wight, a post he held until his appointment to Portsdown.

He retired in January 2013. He is married to Lynne and has 6 daughters.

== Notes ==
Church of England titles
Preceded by Mervyn Banting	Archdeacon of the Isle of Wight; 2003–2006	Succeeded by Caroline Baston
Preceded by Christopher Lowson	Archdeacon of Portsdown; 2006–2013	Succeeded by Joanne Grenfell
