= Rickmansworth School =

Location
- Scots Hill; Croxley Green, Rickmansworth, Hertfordshire, WD3 3AQ; England; 51.645°N 0.456°W

Information
- Type: Academy
- Motto: Nisi Dominus Aedificaverit
- Established: 1954
- Department for Education URN: 136606 Tables
- Ofsted: Reports
- Chair of Governors: Tony Walker
- Headteacher: Mr Matthew Fletcher
- Staff: 100 approx.
- Gender: Mixed
- Age: 11 to 18
- Enrolment: 1400
- Houses: Bury; Inns; Springwell; Stockers
- Former name: Rickmansworth Grammar School
- Website: http://www.rickmansworth.herts.sch.uk

Rickmansworth School is a co-educational secondary school and sixth form in Croxley Green, Hertfordshire, near the town of Rickmansworth. In September 2023, Rickmansworth School received an "Outstanding" inspection rating from Ofsted.

Founded as a grammar school in 1953, the school became comprehensive in 1969, and an academy in 2011. Today, the school is partially selective, accepting 25% of the Year 7 intake based on tests in mathematics and verbal reasoning, and 10% on musical aptitude, with the remaining intake being comprehensive.

== Location ==
The school stands in twenty-six acres of Metropolitan Green Belt woodland situated in a residential area well served by road and rail, on the south side of the A412 road. The M25 motorway is five minutes distance by car, and Croxley and Rickmansworth Metropolitan line stations are ten- and fifteen-minute walks respectively. Watford Junction station (National Rail to London Euston) is fifteen to twenty minutes by car.

== History ==
=== Grammar school (1953 - 1969) ===
Rickmansworth Grammar School was the fifth grammar school to be built after the war. The school was built on the site of a house called Briery Close, which had been the residence of the vicar of Rickmansworth but had fallen vacant before the war. Because building at the site ran late, the first intake in September 1953 was housed in a school in Oxhey, until the Scots Hill premises opened in September 1954. The school was formally opened on 20 June 1956 by Countess Mountbatten of Burma. In the mid-1960s it had around 940 boys and girls, and was situated in 18 acres (7.3 ha) of land.

=== Comprehensive (1969 - 2011) ===
In September 1969 the school ceased to be academically selective and became fully comprehensive. The School was maintained as a county school by the Hertfordshire local education authority until September 1990, when it was among the first schools in the country to take advantage of the opportunity offered by grant-maintained status to become a self-governing school.

In 2003 the school was designated as a specialist Arts College, with a major focus on performing arts, and in April 2008 was awarded a second specialism in Science. The school continues with the specialisms today.

=== Academy (2011 - present) ===
On 1 April 2011, Rickmansworth School officially converted to an academy.

In May 2013, Stephen Burton, who had been headmaster for 13 years, had decided to step down. In July 2013, it was announced that Keith Douglas was to become the school's new headmaster in January 2014. The current headteacher of Rickmansworth School is Matthew Fletcher.

== Mitchell and Webb ==
The school appeared in an episode of the BBC comedy "That Mitchell and Webb Look" in the sketch "The Surprising Adventures of Sir Digby Chicken-Caesar 2 (Series 1, Episode 2)". In which the duo break into the house of an elderly woman, tie her up and pretend that they are visiting "Auntie Marigold". They steal her television and just when they are about to leave the front garden of her house, they're pursued back into the house and through the fence gate at the back of her garden where Ginger is beaten up. They break into Rickmansworth School and steal a Bunsen burner in order to melt batteries down for consumption. The duo are once again pursued out the school's Science block corridor by students, and out the Student Main Entrance where Ginger mentions that "I think we got the makings of (a) Crystal meth theatre" and Webb replies that "it's going to be an Easter weekend to remember".

== Academic results ==
Its standing in comparison with the national average is very favourable at GCSE level and A Level. Its results at GCSE and A level are similar to a grammar school.

In 2024-25, 91% of students achieved grade 4 or higher in English and Mathematics, 81% of students achieved grade 5 or higher and 73% of students were entered for the English Baccalaureate (EBaac) in GCSE.

In 2024-25, the average A Level grade attained by students was a grade B−.

== Notable alumni ==
- George Banks, actor, Coronation Street
- Phil Clarke, Head of Comedy since 2013 at Channel 4, producer of Peep Show
- Adam Godley, actor
- Adrian Newman, Church of England bishop
- Nick Stringer, England international and London Wasps rugby player
- Kyla La Grange, singer

== Notable staff ==
- Ken Smith, chemistry teacher and first chairman of Bury Lake Young Mariners.
