= Richard Chartres =

Former Bishop of London (born 1947)

The Right Reverend and Right Honourable The Lord Chartres GCVO PC FSA
- Bishop of London
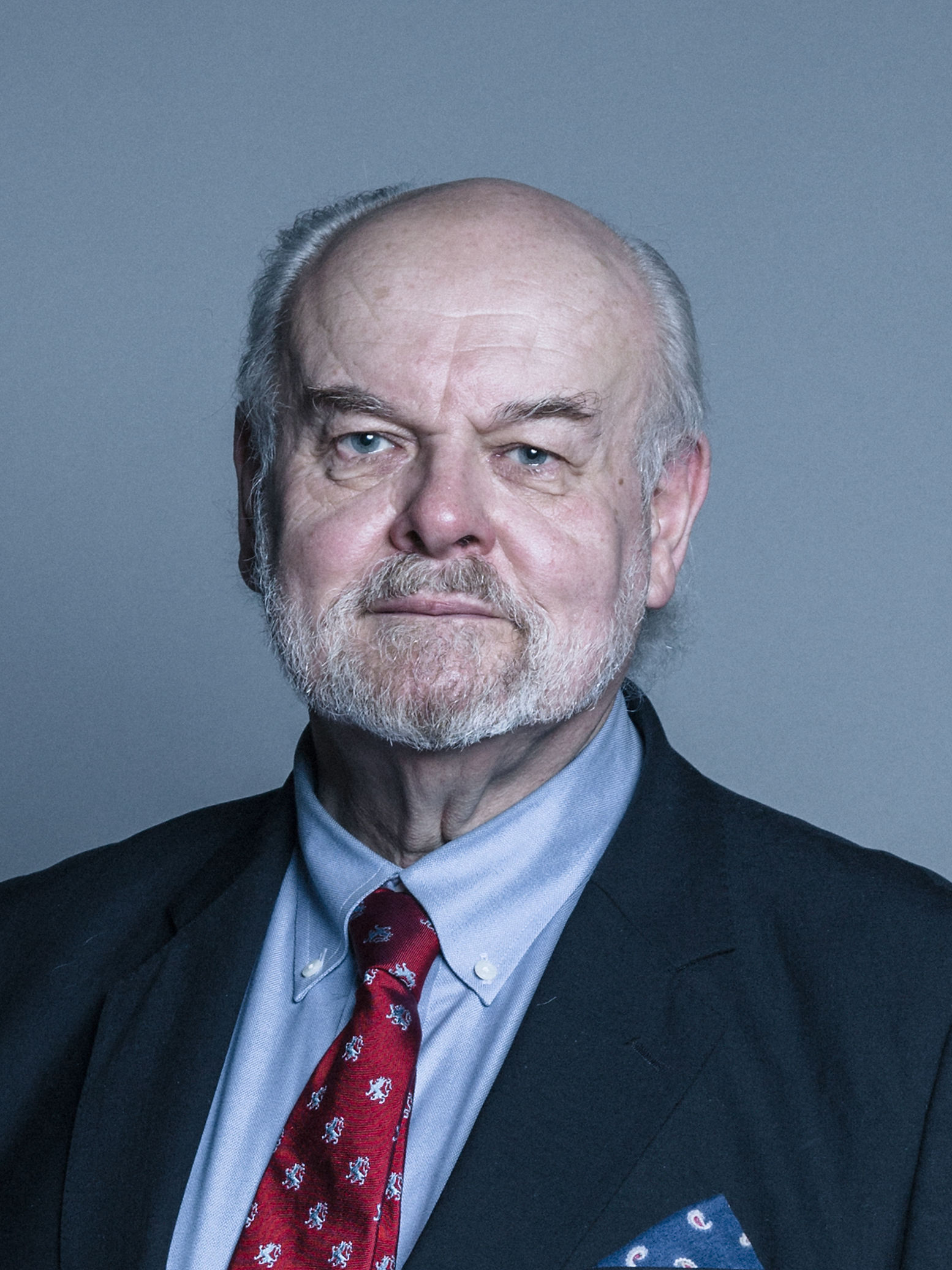
- Lord Chartres, 2018
- Church: Church of England
- Diocese: Diocese of London
- In office: 1995–2017
- Predecessor: David Hope
- Successor: Sarah Mullally
- Previous posts: Gresham Professor of Divinity (1987–1992); Bishop of Stepney (1992–1995)

Orders
- Ordination: 1973 (deacon); 1974 (priest)
- Consecration: 22 May 1992

Personal details
- Born: 11 July 1947 (age 79) Ware, Hertfordshire, England
- Denomination: Anglican
- Residence: The Old Deanery, Dean's Court, London
- Spouse: Caroline Mary McLintock (m. 1982)
- Children: 4
- Education: Trinity College, Cambridge

Member of the House of Lords
- Lord Temporal
- Life peerage 7 November 2017
- Lord Spiritual
- Ex officio as Bishop of London; 22 January 1996 – 31 March 2017

Personal details
- Party: Crossbench

Richard John Carew Chartres, Baron Chartres, GCVO, ChStJ, PC, FSA, FBS (/ˈtʃɑːrtərz/; born 11 July 1947) is a retired senior bishop of the Church of England.

Chartres served as area Bishop of Stepney from 1992 to 1995 and Bishop of London from 1995 to 2017. He was sworn of the Privy Council in the same year he became Bishop of London, having been Gresham Professor of Divinity from 1987 to 1992. In October 2017, Chartres was created a life peer, and now sits as a crossbencher in the House of Lords, previously sitting as a Lord Spiritual.

== Life ==
=== Early life ===
Chartres was born at Ware, Hertfordshire, to Richard Arthur Carew Chartres and Charlotte, daughter of William Day, of London; the Chartres family were Irish gentry of Huguenot origin. He was educated at Hertford Grammar School (now Richard Hale School) and Trinity College, Cambridge (MA), where he read history before pursuing religious studies at Cuddesdon and Lincoln Theological Colleges.

He has spoken of his great-uncle, John Smith Chartres, "called [the] 'Mystery Man of the Treaty' was a member of Sinn Féin and a Protestant civil servant. He was also undoubtedly a gun runner for Michael Collins".

=== Early ordained ministry ===
Chartres was ordained in the Church of England as a deacon in 1973 and as a priest in 1974. He served his curacy at St Andrew's Church, Bedford in the Diocese of St Albans. In 1975, he became domestic chaplain to Robert Runcie, then Bishop of St Albans; he continued in the role when Runcie became Archbishop of Canterbury. Then, in 1984, he joined St Stephen's Church, Rochester Row, in the Diocese of London, as its priest-in-charge. He was made its vicar in 1986, and continued to lead the parish until he was made a bishop in 1992.

He received a Lambeth Bachelor of Divinity degree and holds honorary doctorates from Brunel University, City University London, London Metropolitan University, St. Mary's University College, and London Guildhall University.

=== Gresham professor ===
From 1987 to 1992, he was a Professor of Divinity at Gresham College in London. Based on a three-part lecture series, given in May 1992, he published A Brief History of Gresham College 1597–1997. During the first lecture of the original lecture series he referred to the college as a "magical island like Atlantis" disappearing and re-emerging from the sea. This was a reference both to the Invisible College and Francis Bacon's New Atlantis.

Other Gresham lectures by Chartres covered the Shroud of Turin (November 1988) and the Church of the Holy Sepulchre in Jerusalem (December 1989) when he spoke about the "Gresham Jerusalem Project" as well as on prayer (1991).

=== Bishop ===
On 15 May 1992, Chartres was nominated Bishop of Stepney, an area bishop in the Diocese of London. He was consecrated as bishop on 22 May 1992 at St Paul's Cathedral, by George Carey, Archbishop of Canterbury.

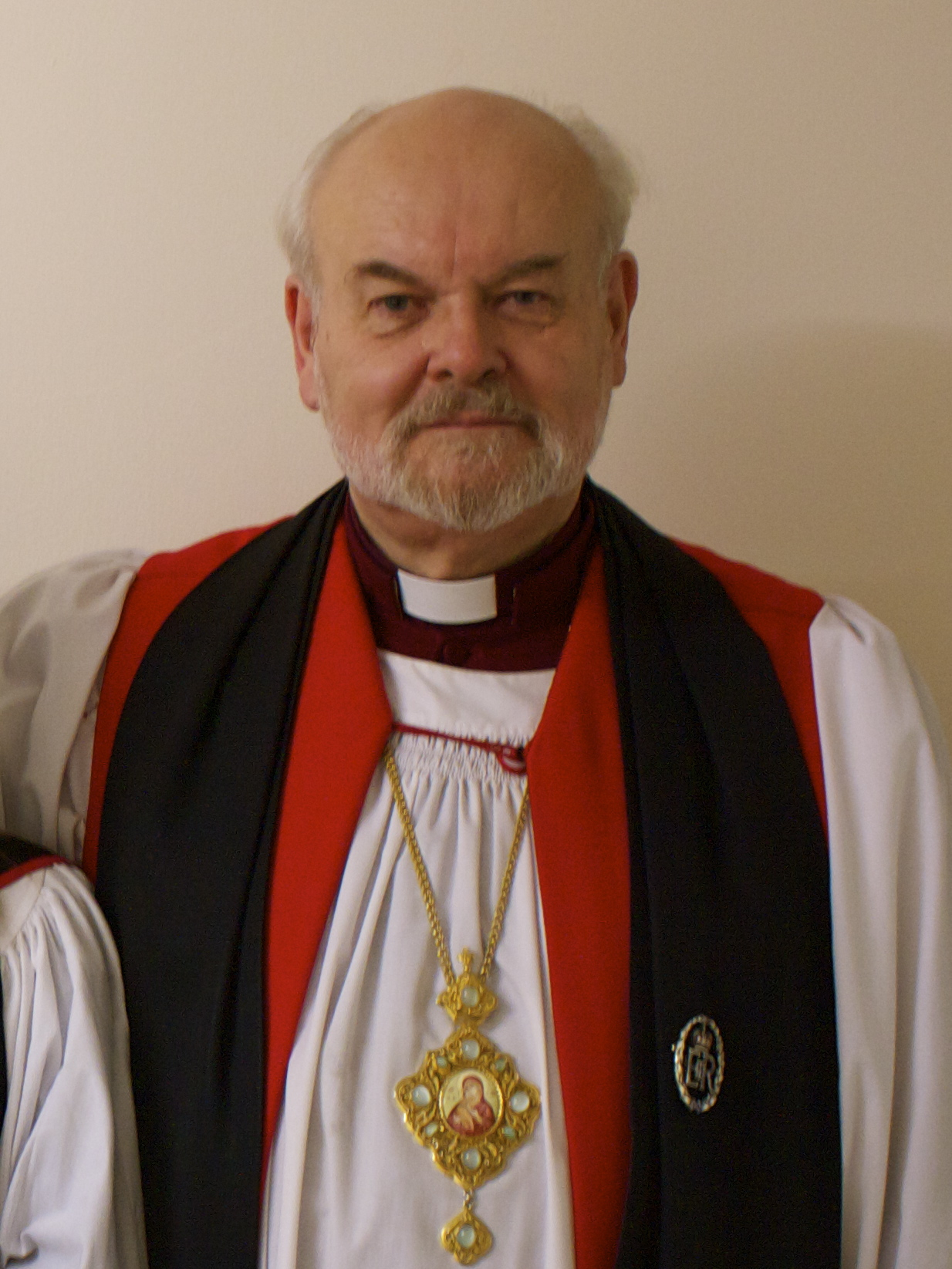
Chartres as Bishop of London, 2013

In November 1995, Chartres was enthroned as the Bishop of London, also becoming Prelate of the Order of the British Empire, Dean of the Chapels Royal and a Privy Counsellor. In 1997 he was appointed a Chaplain of the Most Venerable Order of Saint John (ChStJ). An Honorary Bencher of the Middle Temple since 1998, he is a Liveryman of the Worshipful Companies of Merchant Taylors and of Drapers, and has been admitted as an Honorary Freeman of the Grocers', Vintners', Weavers' and the Woolmen's Companies.

In 1997, Chartres was one of the executors of the will of Diana, Princess of Wales, and delivered an address at her memorial service in 2007. He confirmed both Prince William and Catherine Middleton. On 12 September 2009 he presided at the marriage of Lord Frederick Windsor to actress Sophie Winkleman at the Chapel Royal in Hampton Court Palace.

Chartres is the founder and chairman of the trustees of the St Ethelburga's Centre for Reconciliation and Peace. He is also a trustee of Coexist, sitting on the advisory council of the Tony Blair Faith Foundation. In October 2005, he joined Marianne Suhr at St Giles in the Fields, London WC2, to launch a new maintenance project for the capital's historic churches.

In January 2006, Chartres was criticised by the media for his decision to spend Easter on a cruise ship giving lectures on theology rather than attend the services at St Paul's Cathedral. At the time, Chartres was on a two-month sabbatical, his first in 33 years. He preached the sermon at the wedding of Prince William and Catherine Middleton on 29 April 2011. In 2013, Chartres led the funeral service of Baroness Thatcher, with whom he had a close friendship.

Chartres oversaw the Church of England's relations with the Eastern Orthodox churches, representing the Church of England at the funeral of Patriarch Alexy II of Moscow of the Russian Orthodox Church and the enthronement of his successor, Kirill I, at Saint Basil's Cathedral.

As Bishop of London, Chartres chose not to ordain women as priests, and instead only ordained both women and men to the diaconate. This was to a concession to the large number of traditionalists in the Diocese of London, with Chartres saying in 2002 that he was "very much pro women priests".

On 19 July 2016, it was announced that Chartres was to retire as Bishop of London effective from Shrove Tuesday, 28 February 2017, but remain as Dean of the Chapels Royal until the next Bishop of London took post. He retired as dean following his 72nd birthday in July 2019, being succeeded by Dame Sarah Mullally.

=== Green issues ===
Since its launch in 2006, Chartres has led the Church of England's "shrinking the footprint" campaign, aimed at cutting 80% of the Church's carbon emissions by 2050. In the launch and subsequently, Chartres criticised pollution of the planet by people going on holidays by plane. Michael O'Leary, boss of the low-cost airline Ryanair, responded that "the Bishop of London has got empty churches – presumably if no one went on holidays perhaps they might turn up and listen to his sermons. God bless the Bishop!" Also, after criticism that his taking flights for "diocese work" as well as retaining a chauffeur-driven car were against the ideals of this campaign, he pledged not to fly for a year.

In October 2008, the Independent on Sunday named Chartres as number 75 of the top 100 environmentalists in Britain on their "Green List".

=== Patronage ===
Lord Chartres serves as an ambassador for wildlife charity WWF and as a patron of various other organisations, including:

- The Burgon Society for the study of academical dress (also a Fellow)
- The Fellowship of Saint Alban and Saint Sergius
- The Georgian Group
- The National Churches Trust
- Paintings in Hospitals, a charity that provides art for health and social care in England, Wales and Northern Ireland
- The Prayer Book Society of England (Ecclesiastical Patron)
- Prospex, a charity which works with young people in North London
- St Paul's Theological Centre
- The Tower Hamlets Friends & Neighbours, a charity which works with older people in East London
- The Westminster Theological Centre
- The Choral Foundation, Hampton Court Palace
- The Nigerian Chaplaincy
- Honorary Chaplain to the Brigade of Gurkhas

== Personal life ==
In 1982, Chartres married Caroline (eldest daughter of Sir Alan McLintock), then a freelance writer and now the commissioning editor of a publishing house, with whom he has four children: Alexander, Sophie, Louis and Clio.

Lord Chartres is a member of the Garrick Club in London.

In 2023, he became a vice president of the National Churches Trust.

== Honours and awards ==
Appointed a Chaplain of the Order of St John in 1997 and a Knight Commander of the Royal Victorian Order (KCVO) in the 2009 Queen's Birthday Honours, Chartres was promoted Knight Grand Cross of the Royal Victorian Order (GCVO) on his retirement as Dean of the Chapels Royal on 11 July 2019: as is customary for Church of England clergy who receive the accolade of the realm, Chartres never used the honorific prefix of "Sir".

On 12 October 2017, it was announced that Chartres would be created a life peer, to sit on the crossbenches in the House of Lords, having previously sat on the Bishops' bench. Taking the title of Baron Chartres, of Wilton in the County of Wiltshire, he was introduced to the Upper House as a Lord Temporal on 7 November 2017.

Lord Chartres played a leading role in the Coronation of Charles III and Camilla, carrying the Queen's Ring and presenting the Queen's Sceptre for blessing.

=== Honours ===
- : Life Peer - 2017
- : Knight Grand Cross of the Royal Victorian Order (GCVO) - 2019
  - KCVO - 2009
- : Chaplain of the Order of St John (ChStJ) - 1997.

=== Honorary degrees ===
- Honorary DD degree from Queen Mary and Westfield College, London
- Honorary DD degree from City University London: 19 May 1999
- Honorary DD degree from Brunel University: 1999
- Honorary DD degree from St. Mary's University College, Surrey
- Honorary DLitt degree from London Guildhall University
- Honorary DD degree from King's College London: 3 November 2010
- Honorary DD degree from Nashotah House: 2018.

=== Fellowships ===
- Fellow of the Society of Antiquaries of London: 1999
- Fellow of Trinity College, Cambridge: 2017
- Visiting Fellow of Nuffield College, Oxford
- Honorary Fellow of King's College, Cambridge
- Honorary Fellow of St. John's College, Cambridge.

== Styles ==
- The Reverend Richard Chartres (1973–1986)
- The Reverend Professor Richard Chartres (1986–1992)
- The Right Reverend Richard Chartres (1992–1995)
- The Right Reverend and Right Honourable Richard Chartres, Lord Bishop of London (1995–2010)
- The Right Reverend and Right Honourable Richard Chartres, Lord Bishop of London KCVO (2010–2017)
- The Right Reverend and Right Honourable the Lord Chartres KCVO PC (2017–2019)
- The Right Reverend and Right Honourable the Lord Chartres GCVO PC (2019–present)

Church of England titles
Preceded by Jim Thompson	Bishop of Stepney; 1992–1995	Succeeded by John Sentamu
Preceded by David Hope	Bishop of London; 1995–2017	Succeeded by Sarah Mullally
