= Mervyn Banting =

Anglican Archdeacon (1937–2022)

Kenneth Mervyn Lancelot Hadfield Banting (known as Mervyn; 8 September 1937 – 9 February 2022) was an Anglican priest, who was an Archdeacon of the Isle of Wight.

Banting was educated at Pembroke College, Cambridge and Cuddesdon College. He was ordained deacon in 1965 and priest in 1966 and began his career as Chaplain at Winchester College after which he was Assistant Curate at St Francis, Leigh Park. He then held incumbencies in Hemel Hempstead, Bedford and Portsmouth before his island appointment in 1996.

Banting retired as Archdeacon in 2003. He died on 9 February 2022, at the age of 84.

== Notes ==
Church of England titles
Preceded by Antony Hubert Michael Turner	Archdeacon of the Isle of Wight; February 1996– November 2003	Succeeded by Trevor Reader
