= Shrinking the footprint =

Shrinking the footprint is a campaign by the Church of England to reduce its carbon footprint.

The campaign is being led by the Bishop of London, Dr Richard Chartres and was launched on World Environment Day in June 2006 with an invitation to all churches to carry out an energy audit and debate energy-related issues. This is seen as the first step to achieving 'The 20% Church' – cutting carbon emissions from Church activities, structures and processes to 20% of current levels by 2050, in line with the recommendations of the Intergovernmental Panel on Climate Change.

The campaign follows a discussion at the 2005 General Synod that resulted in a call for the Church to engage with the issues of climate change and energy use.

== See also ==
- Avoiding dangerous climate change
- Business action on climate change
- Christianity and environmentalism
- Individual and political action on climate change
- Energy use and conservation in the United Kingdom
- Energy policy of the United Kingdom
- Kyoto Protocol
