= Stephen Oliver (bishop) =

The Right Reverend Stephen Oliver
- Bishop of Stepney
- Diocese: Diocese of London
- In office: 2003–6 July 2010 (retired)
- Predecessor: John Sentamu
- Successor: Adrian Newman
- Other post: Canon Precentor at St Paul's (1997–2003)

Orders
- Ordination: 1971 (deacon); 1972 (priest)
- Consecration: 2003

Personal details
- Born: 7 January 1948 (age 78)
- Denomination: Anglican
- Parents: John & Nora Greenhalgh
- Spouse: Hilary Barkham (m. 1969; d. 2010)
- Children: 2 sons, incl. Simon
- Profession: Author (prayer)
- Education: King's College London

Stephen John Oliver AKC (born 7 January 1948) was the Anglican area Bishop of Stepney from 2003 to 2010.

Oliver was trained for the priesthood at King's College London, spending his final year at St Augustine's College, Canterbury before a curacy at Clifton, Nottingham. After an incumbency at St Mary Plumtree in the same diocese he became head of religious programming at the BBC. From 1997 until 2003 he was a Canon Residentiary at St Paul's Cathedral, London before his appointment as the area Bishop of Stepney following John Sentamu's appointment as Bishop of Birmingham. Oliver retired on 6 July 2010. In March 2013 'Inside Grief' ISBN 9780281068432 edited by Oliver was published by SPCK.

== Styles ==
- The Reverend Stephen Oliver (1971–1997)
- The Reverend Canon Stephen Oliver (1997–2003)
- The Right Reverend Stephen Oliver (2003–present)

Church of England titles
Preceded by John Sentamu	Bishop of Stepney; 2003–2010	Succeeded by Adrian Newman
