= Hampton Weekes =

Christian William Hampton Weekes (3 September 1880 – 31 August 1948), known as Hampton Weekes, was Archdeacon of the Isle of Wight from 1937 until his death.

Weekes was educated at Charterhouse and Trinity College, Cambridge and ordained in 1907. After a curacy in Hale, Surrey he was Rector of Yaverland from 1909 until 1913. After this he became Vicar of Brading and (in 1934) Rural Dean of East Wight.

== Notes ==
Church of England titles
Preceded by Robert McKew	Archdeacon of the Isle of Wight; February 1937–November 1948	Succeeded by Edward Roberts
