= Lewen Tugwell =

Archdeacon of the Isle of Wight

Lewen Greenwood Tugwell was an Archdeacon of the Isle of Wight.

Tugwell was born in 1862 into an ecclesiastical family, the son of the Rev. L. S. Tugwell and educated at Trinity College, Dublin and ordained in 1895. He held curacies at St Saviour's, Battersea Park and Holy Trinity, Guildford before becoming the Anglican Chaplain at Freiburg in 1900. He was Vicar of St Mark's, Farnborough from 1904 to 1911 and Rector of Calbourne-with-Newtown from 1912. He was Rural Dean of West Wight from 1918 to 1922; and Archdeacon of the Isle of Wight from then until 1928.

He died on 1 October 1937.

== Notes ==
Church of England titles
Preceded by James Macarthur	Archdeacon of the Isle of Wight; February 1922– November 1928	Succeeded by Robert McKew
