= St Thomas Church, Winchester =

Coordinates: 51.06125°N 1.3185°W

- St Thomas & St Clement Church, Winchester
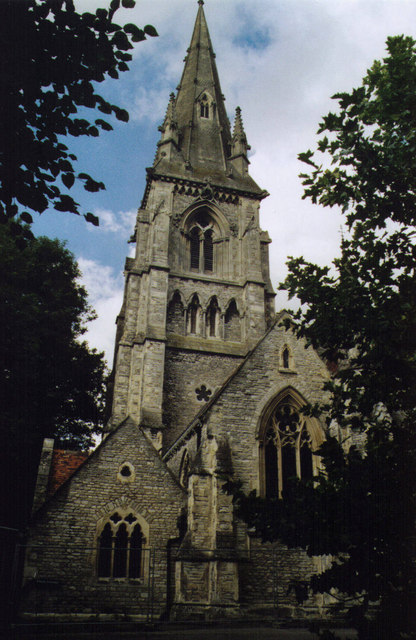
- More images
- OS grid reference: SU 47851 29318
- Country: England
- Previous denomination: Church of England

History
- Consecrated: 16 April 1847

Architecture
- Architect: E. W. Elmslie
- Style: Gothic Revival
- Years built: 1845–46, steeple 1857
- Construction cost: £8,152 (steeple £1,800)
- Closed: 1969

St Thomas Church (previously St Thomas & St Clement Church) is a disused Church of England parish church in Winchester, England.

An earlier St Thomas Church (which itself replaced a church dedicated to St Petroc which fell into decay in the 14th century following the Black Death) was in St Thomas Street. It was demolished in 1845 and replaced by the present church, about 100m away in Southgate Street.

Nikolaus Pevsner remarked that it is the most ambitious Victorian church in Winchester, and it is remarkable that it should be so early; for it is ‘archaeological’, i.e. no longer uninformed in its Gothic motifs and their handling.

The new church joined the parishes of St Thomas and St Clement and contained around 2,500 souls. The new church was consecrated on 16 April 1847 by the Bishop of Winchester.

This church closed in 1969 and for a while housed the Hampshire Record Office. At that time it was listed Grade II and remains on the statutory List of Buildings of Special Architectural or Historic Interest with the name of Hampshire Record Office. The Record Office moved to a new building and the church, called the St Thomas Centre, was used as charity offices until about 2010. It is now in the process of being converted into housing, with nine flats and properties being created inside the building.

== Organ ==
The first organ was by Bishop and Son with additions by J.W. Walker and Sons. In 1957 it was replaced by a pipe organ dating from 1756 by Father Smith which was originally in St Maurice's Church, Winchester. When St Thomas closed, the organ moved to St Deny's Church, Portswood, Southampton. A specification of the organ can be found on the National Pipe Organ Register.
