= Jenny Rowley =

The Reverend Jenny Rowley
- Archdeacon of Portsdown
- Diocese: Diocese of Portsmouth
- In office: 2020–2024
- Other post: Area Dean of Croydon Addington (2015–2020)

Orders
- Ordination: 2002 (deacon); 2003 (priest)

Personal details
- Born: 1961 (age 64–65)
- Education: Lady Margaret Hall, Oxford

Jennifer Jane Elisabeth (Jenny) Rowley (born 1961) is an Anglican priest.

Jenny Rowley was educated at Lady Margaret Hall, Oxford. After curacies in Kingsthorpe and Kettering she was Priest in charge at Nettleham. She was Rector of Selsdon, and Area Dean of Addington, from 2013 until her appointment as an Archdeacon. She resigned as Archdeacon of Portsdown effective 31 January 2024.

Church of England titles
Preceded by Joanne Grenfell	Archdeacon of Portsdown; 2020–2024	TBA
