= Martin Seeley =

British Church of England bishop and Lord Spiritual (born 1954)

The Right Reverend Martin Seeley
- Bishop of St Edmundsbury and Ipswich
- Church: Church of England
- Diocese: Diocese of St Edmundsbury and Ipswich
- In office: 2015–2025
- Predecessor: Nigel Stock; David Thomson (Acting)
- Successor: Graeme Knowles (Acting)
- Previous post: Principal of Westcott House, Cambridge (2006–2015)

Orders
- Ordination: 1978 (deacon); 1979 (priest)
- Consecration: 14 May 2015 by Justin Welby

Personal details
- Born: 29 May 1954 (age 72) Portsmouth, Hampshire, United Kingdom
- Denomination: Anglican
- Residence: Bishop's House, Ipswich
- Spouse: Cynthia McLean (m. 1980–1989) Jutta Brueck (m. 1999)
- Children: two
- Education: Jesus College, Cambridge; Ripon College Cuddesdon; Union Theological Seminary, New York City

Member of the House of Lords
- Lord Spiritual
- Bishop of St Edmundsbury and Ipswich; 21 March 2022 – 28 February 2025

Martin Alan Seeley (born 29 May 1954) is a British retired Church of England bishop. From May 2015 til his February 2025 retirement, he served as the Bishop of St Edmundsbury and Ipswich; from 2006 to 2015, he was the Principal of Westcott House, Cambridge.

== Early life and education ==
Seeley was born in Portsmouth on 29 May 1954. He studied at Jesus College, Cambridge. He graduated with a Bachelor of Arts (BA) degree in 1976 and a Bachelor of Education (BEd) degree in 1978. In 1976, he entered Ripon College Cuddesdon to study for ordained ministry. He then attended Union Theological Seminary, New York City, from which he graduated with a Master of Sacred Theology (STM) degree in 1978. On 16 October 2018 he received the degree of Doctor of Divinity, honoris causa from Berkeley Divinity School at Yale, New Haven, where he was also invited to deliver the 2018 Cheney Lecture.

== Ordained ministry ==
Seeley was ordained in the Church of England: made a deacon at Michaelmas 1978 (24 September), by David Tustin, Bishop of Grimsby, at St Paul's Ashby, and as a priest the Michaelmas following (30 September 1979), by Simon Phipps, Bishop of Lincoln, at Lincoln Cathedral. His first appointment was as a curate at St Peter's Church, Bottesford, Lincolnshire (1978–1980).

In 1980, Seeley returned to the United States where he was a curate at the Church of the Epiphany and assistant director of Trinity Church, Manhattan, New York City (1980–1985) and then executive director of the Thompson Center, an ecumenical lay and clergy education programme in St Louis, Missouri (1985–1990).

In 1990, Seeley returned to England, where he was a selection secretary at the advisory board of Ministry and secretary for Continuing Ministerial Education (1990–1996). From 1996 to 2006, he was the vicar of the Isle of Dogs, a parish in the Diocese of London. In September 2006, he was appointed Principal of Westcott House, Cambridge, a theological college in the Liberal Catholic tradition of the Church of England. In 2008, he was appointed an honorary canon of Ely Cathedral.

=== Episcopal ministry ===
In November 2014, it was announced that Seeley would become the 11th Bishop of St Edmundsbury and Ipswich. His canonical election was confirmed on 7 May 2015. On 14 May 2015, he was consecrated a bishop by Justin Welby, Archbishop of Canterbury during a service at Westminster Abbey. On 20 June 2015, he was installed as Bishop of St Edmundsbury and Ipswich at St Edmundsbury Cathedral. He has also been an honorary assistant bishop of the Diocese of Ely since 2015. He was introduced as a member (Lord Spiritual) of the House of Lords on 21 March 2022. He retired effective 28 February 2025.

=== Views ===
In January 2023, Seeley welcomed the Church of England's introduction of blessings of same-sex couples but expressed disappointment that it did not go further: "the faithful, pastoral, loving and just way forward is to extend Holy Matrimony to same-sex couples".

In November 2023, he was one of 44 Church of England bishops who signed an open letter supporting the use of the Prayers of Love and Faith (i.e. blessings for same-sex couples) and called for "Guidance being issued without delay that includes the removal of all restrictions on clergy entering same-sex civil marriages, and on bishops ordaining and licensing such clergy".

== Personal life ==
Seeley was married to Cynthia McLean from 1980 until 1989. He married Jutta Brueck who was his curate at Christ Church with St Luke's, Isle of Dogs on 23 January 1999; she is also a priest. They have two children.

Seeley was amongst five recipients of the 2025 Suffolk Medal, presented on June 21 by the Lord Lieutenant of Suffolk as part of Suffolk Day celebrations. His was cited as having "inspired diverse congregations and communities and used his wisdom, humility and good humour to steer the county in matters of faith."

== Styles ==
- The Reverend Martin Seeley (1978–2007)
- The Reverend Canon Martin Seeley (2007–2015)
- The Right Reverend Martin Seeley (2015–present)

Church of England titles
Preceded by Nigel Stock	Bishop of St Edmundsbury and Ipswich; 2015–2025	TBA
