= Caroline Baston =

Anglican Archdeacon

The Venerable Caroline Baston
- Priest in Charge of the Parish of St Andrew, Blunsdon
- Church: Church of England
- Diocese: Diocese of Bristol
- In office: 2011 to 2016
- Other posts: Warden of the Community of St Mary the Virgin (2013-2021); Archdeacon of the Isle of Wight (2006-2011)

Personal details
- Born: Caroline Jane Baston; 17 October 1956 (age 69)
- Denomination: Anglicanism
- Education: University of Birmingham; Ripon College Cuddesdon

Caroline Jane Baston (born 17 October 1956) is a Church of England priest. From 2006 to 2011, she served as Archdeacon of the Isle of Wight.

== Early life and education ==
Baston was born on 17 October 1956. She studied at the University of Birmingham, graduating with a Bachelor of Science (BSc) degree in 1978 and a Certificate of Education (CertEd) in 1979. She then began her first career as a mathematics teacher, working at a comprehensive school in inner-city Sandwell.

In 1987, Baston entered Ripon College Cuddesdon, an Anglican theological college. There, she spent the next two years studying theology and training for ordination.

== Ordained ministry ==
Baston was ordained in the Church of England as a deacon in 1989. From 1989 to 1994, she served as Parish Deacon of St Christopher's Church, Thornhill, Southampton. In 1994, she was ordained as a priest; this was the first year that the Church of England ordained women to the priesthood and therefore she was one of its first female priests. She was an Assistant Curate at St Christopher's, Thornhill, and then Rector of All Saints', Winchester with St Andrew's, Chilcomb. She was appointed an honorary canon of Winchester Cathedral in 2000.

Baston was Archdeacon of the Isle of Wight from 2006 until 2011. On 3 October 2011, she was licensed as Transition Minister and Priest-in-charge of St Andrew's, North Swindon. In November 2013, she was appointed Warden of the Community of St Mary the Virgin, an Anglican religious order. She was appointed Master, Community of Hospital of St Nicholas, Salisbury, in 2021

Church of England titles
Preceded by Trevor Reader	Archdeacon of the Isle of Wight; 2006–2011	Succeeded by Peter Sutton
