= Norman Crowder =

Norman Harry Crowder (20 October 1926 – 10 February 2013) was Archdeacon of Portsmouth from 1985 to 1993.

Born in Nottingham on 20 October 1926, he was educated at Nottingham High School and St John's College, Cambridge. After National Service with the RAF Educational Service he was ordained in 1952. He was an Assistant Curate St Mary's, Radcliffe-on-Trent and then Residential Chaplain to the Bishop of Portsmouth until 1959. He was Chaplain at Canford School from 1959 until 1972 when he became Vicar of St John's, Oakfield, Ryde. From 1975 to 1985 he was Director of Religious Education in the Portsmouth Diocese and a Residential Canon of its Cathedral. After this he became Archdeacon of Portsmouth.

He died in Salisbury on 10 February 2013. He had married Pauline. Their son Richard worked at the Foreign and Commonwealth Office

== Notes ==
Church of England titles
| Preceded by Ronald Victor Scruby | Archdeacon of Portsmouth; February 1985– November 1993 | Succeeded by Graeme Paul Knowles |
