= Adrian Newman (bishop) =

British Anglican bishop

The Right Reverend Adrian Newman
- area Bishop of Stepney
- Church: Church of England
- Diocese: Diocese of London
- In office: 2011–2018
- Predecessor: Stephen Oliver
- Successor: Joanne Grenfell
- Other post: Dean of Rochester (2004–2011)

Orders
- Ordination: 1986
- Consecration: 22 July 2011

Personal details
- Born: 21 December 1958 (age 67)
- Denomination: Anglican
- Spouse: Gillian (née Hayes)
- Children: 3
- Education: University of Bristol; Trinity College, Bristol

Adrian Newman (born 21 December 1958) is a British Anglican bishop. He had served as Dean of Rochester from 2004 to 2011, before becoming Bishop of Stepney, an area bishop in the Diocese of London (2011–2018). He retired early due to ill health but continues to be active in the Church of England as an honorary assistant bishop.

== Early life and education ==
Newman was born on 21 December 1958 to John Henry Newman and Ruth Doreen Newman. He was educated at Rickmansworth School, a comprehensive school in Rickmansworth, Hertfordshire. He studied economics at the University of Bristol, graduating with a Bachelor of Science (BSc) degree in 1980. He then worked as an economist.

In 1982, Newman entered Trinity College, Bristol, an Evangelical Anglican theological college, to train for ordained ministry. Having studied theology during this time, he completed a Diploma of Higher Education (DipHE) in 1985. He left theological college in 1985 to be ordained in the Church of England, but continued his theological studies and completed a Master of Philosophy (MPhil) degree in 1989.

== Ordained ministry ==
Newman was ordained in the Church of England as a deacon in 1985 and as a priest in 1986. From 1985 to 1989, he served his curacy at St Mark's Church, Forest Gate in the Diocese of Chelmsford. Then, from 1989 to 1996, he was Vicar of Christ Church, Wadsley Bridge and Hillsborough in the Diocese of Sheffield. He was also Area Dean of Hallam from 1994 to 1996. From 1996 to 2004, he was Rector of St Martin in the Bull Ring in the Diocese of Birmingham. In 2005, he was appointed the Dean of Rochester; this made him the head of the chapter of Rochester Cathedral.

=== Episcopal ministry ===
On 22 March 2011, it was announced that Newman would succeed Stephen Oliver as Bishop of Stepney, an area bishop of the Diocese of London. On 22 July 2011, he was consecrated as a bishop at St Paul's Cathedral by Rowan Williams, Archbishop of Canterbury. In addition to his other pastoral duties, Newman made regular media appearances promoting ministry in the local community and was in attendance throughout London 2012. He resigned his see effective 31 October 2018 on grounds of ill health: he had been suffering from debilitating migraines and anxiety as a medication side effect.

Newman has held permission to officiate in the Diocese of London since 2019 and in the Diocese of Chelmsford since 2020. He has also been an honorary assistant bishop in the Diocese of Chelmsford since February 2022.

== Personal life ==
In 1981, Newman married Gillian. She is also ordained in the Church of England. Together they have three sons.

== Honours ==
Newman was conferred with an honorary fellowship of Canterbury Christ Church University in 2009.

== Styles ==
- The Reverend Adrian Newman (1986–2004)
- The Very Reverend Adrian Newman (2004–2011)
- The Right Reverend Adrian Newman (2011–present)
