= Robert McKew =

Irish Anglican priest (1872–1944)

Right Rev. Robert McKew CBE (16 February 1872 – 11 October 1944) was an Irish Anglican priest in the 20th century.

McKew was born on Valentia Island, County Kerry. He was educated at Trinity College, Dublin and ordained in 1902. He became a Royal Navy Chaplain from January 1903, and served on (amongst others) HMS Hyacinth, HMS Venerable, HMS Cornwall and HMS Collingwood. He became Chaplain of the Fleet in 1924 and held the post for five years. He was then Archdeacon of the Isle of Wight until his retirement in 1936. An Honorary Chaplain to the King, he died on the Isle of Wight in 1944.

He was appointed a Commander of the Order of the British Empire in the 1919 Birthday Honours.

Church of England titles
Preceded by Charles William Chamberlayne Ingles	Chaplain of the Fleet; 1924–1929	Succeeded by Walter Kenrick Knight-Adkin
Preceded by Lewen Greenwood Tugwell	Archdeacon of the Isle of Wight; February 1929– November 1936	Succeeded by Christian William Hampton Weekes
