= Peter Sutton (priest) =

Former religious leader in the United Kingdom (born 1959)

Peter Allerton Sutton (born 18 July 1959) is a priest who served as the Archdeacon of the Isle of Wight from 2011 to 2018.

Sutton was educated at Exeter University. He held Curacies at Holy Trinity, Fareham, and St Mary, Alverstoke. He was Vicar of St Faith, Lee-on-the-Solent, from 2003 to 2012. As of September 2018, Sutton serves as parish priest for the villages of Greatham, Empshott, Hawkley and Priors Dean.

Church of England titles
Preceded by Caroline Baston	Archdeacon of the Isle of Wight; 2011–2018	Peter Leonard
