= John Sentamu =

Archbishop of York from 2005 to 2020

The Right Reverend and Right Honourable The Lord Sentamu PC
- Archbishop of York
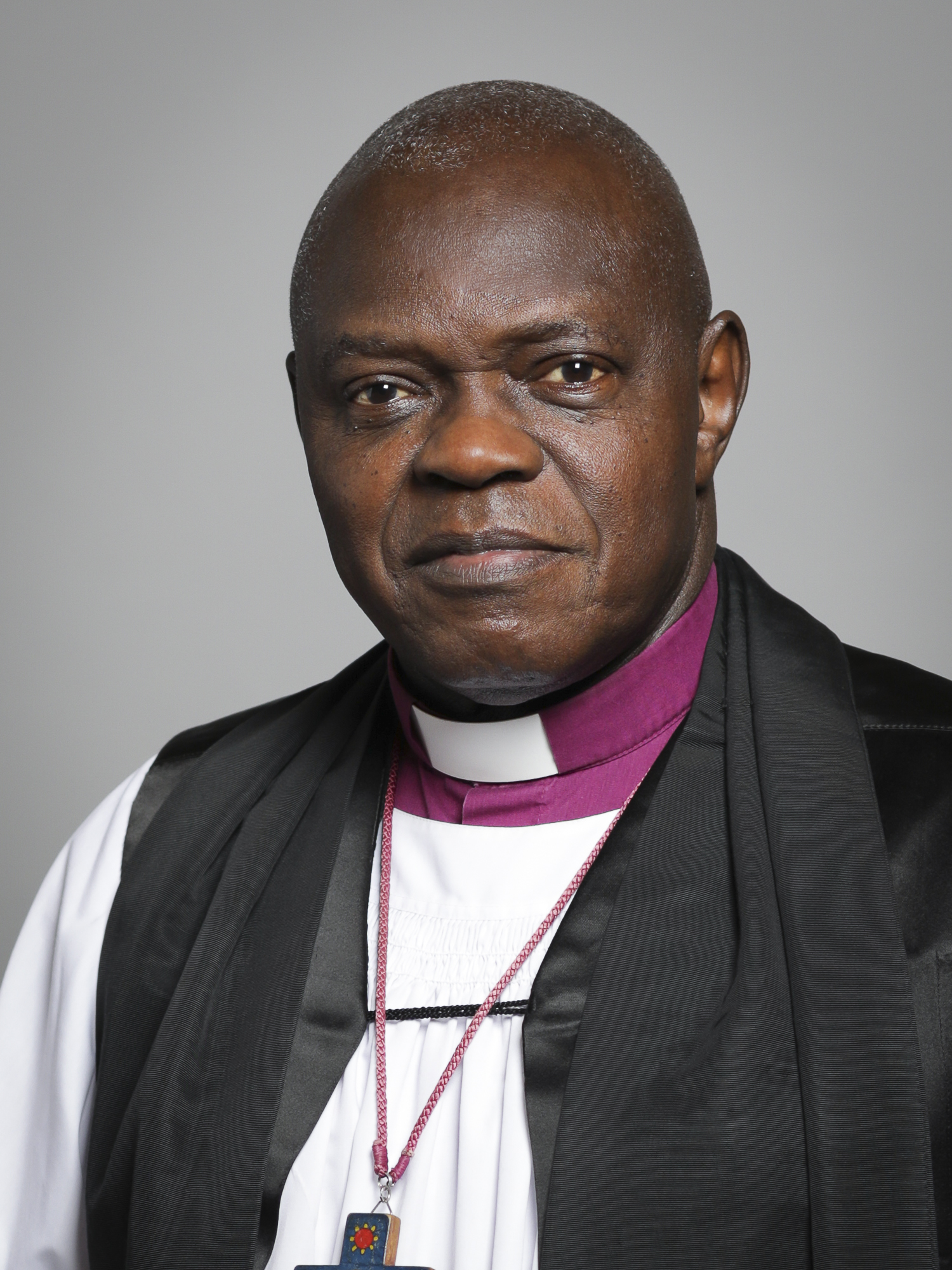
- Official portrait, 2019
- Province: York
- Diocese: York
- In office: 2005–2020
- Predecessor: David Hope
- Successor: Stephen Cottrell
- Other posts: Bishop of Stepney (1996–2002); Bishop of Birmingham (2002–2005)

Orders
- Ordination: 1979
- Consecration: 25 September 1996 by George Carey

Personal details
- Born: John Tucker Mugabi Sentamu; 10 June 1949 (age 77) Kampala, Uganda
- Denomination: Church of England
- Parents: John and Ruth Walakira
- Spouse: Margaret Wanambwa (m. 1973)
- Children: 2
- Occupation: Life peer
- Profession: Cleric, lawyer
- Education: Makerere University; Selwyn College, Cambridge; Ridley Hall, Cambridge

Member of the House of Lords
- Lord Temporal
- Life peerage 27 April 2021
- Lord Spiritual
- Ex officio as Archbishop of York; 25 January 2006 – 7 June 2020

John Tucker Mugabi Sentamu, Baron Sentamu, PC (/ˈsɛntəmuː/; Luganda pronunciation: [sːéːntámû]; born 10 June 1949) is a retired Anglican bishop and life peer. He was Archbishop of York and Primate of England from 2005 to 2020. In retirement he was subject to investigation over his handling of child sexual abuse allegations and was asked to step back from ministry because of his mishandling of safeguarding cases.

Born near Kampala in Uganda, Sentamu studied law at Makerere University before gaining employment as an advocate of the Supreme Court of Uganda. Speaking out against the regime of President Idi Amin, he was briefly imprisoned before fleeing in 1974 to the United Kingdom, where he devoted himself to Anglicanism, beginning his study of theology at Selwyn College, Cambridge, in 1976 and eventually gaining a doctorate in 1984. He studied for ordination at Ridley Hall, Cambridge, and was ordained in 1979. In 1996 he was consecrated as the area bishop of Stepney and in 2002 became Bishop of Birmingham. In 2005 he was appointed to the office of Archbishop of York.

He has also received attention for his vocal criticism of former Zimbabwean president Robert Mugabe.

Sentamu was omitted from the first list of new peerages following his resignation as archbishop, but it was announced in December 2020 that Sentamu would be created a crossbench life peer in the second list of 2020 Political Honours.

== Biography ==
=== Early life ===
Sentamu was born in 1949 in Masooli village, Gayaza, near Kampala, Uganda, the sixth of thirteen children. He obtained an LLB degree from Makerere University, Kampala in 1971, and practised as an advocate of the High Court of Uganda until 1974, being briefly a judge of the High Court. In 1973, he married his wife Margaret who is a deacon. Three weeks after his marriage, he incurred the wrath of the dictator Idi Amin and was detained for 90 days. In a speech in 2007, he described how during that time he had been "kicked around like a football and beaten terribly", saying "the temptation to give up hope of release was always present". He fled his home country to arrive as an immigrant in the United Kingdom in 1974.

=== Education and early ministry ===
Sentamu studied theology at Selwyn College, Cambridge, where he subsequently received a BA degree in 1976, promoted to the Cambridge MA in 1979, and a PhD degree in 1984. He trained for the priesthood at Ridley Hall, Cambridge, being ordained a priest in 1979. His doctoral thesis is entitled "Some aspects of soteriology, with particular reference to the thought of J. K. Mozley, from an African perspective". He worked as assistant chaplain at Selwyn College, as chaplain at a remand centre and as curate and vicar in a series of parish appointments.

Sentamu was consecrated a bishop on 25 September 1996 by George Carey, Archbishop of Canterbury, at St Paul's Cathedral; to serve as Bishop of Stepney, a suffragan and area bishop in the Diocese of London. It was during this time that he served as advisor to the Stephen Lawrence Judicial Enquiry. In 2002 he chaired the Damilola Taylor review. That same year he was appointed Bishop of Birmingham where his ministry, according to the Archbishop of Canterbury, Rowan Williams, was praised by "Christians of all backgrounds". Sentamu became President of Youth for Christ in 2004 and President of the YMCA in April 2005.

=== Archbishop of York ===
On 17 June 2005 the prime minister's office announced Sentamu's translation to York as the 97th archbishop. He was formally elected by the chapter of York Minster on 21 July, legally confirmed as archbishop at St Mary-le-Bow, London on 5 October, and enthroned at York Minster on 30 November 2005 (the feast of Saint Andrew), at a ceremony with African singing and dancing and contemporary music, with Sentamu himself playing African drums during the service. As Archbishop of York, Sentamu sat in the House of Lords and was admitted, as a matter of course, to the Privy Council of the United Kingdom. He was the first black archbishop in the Church of England.

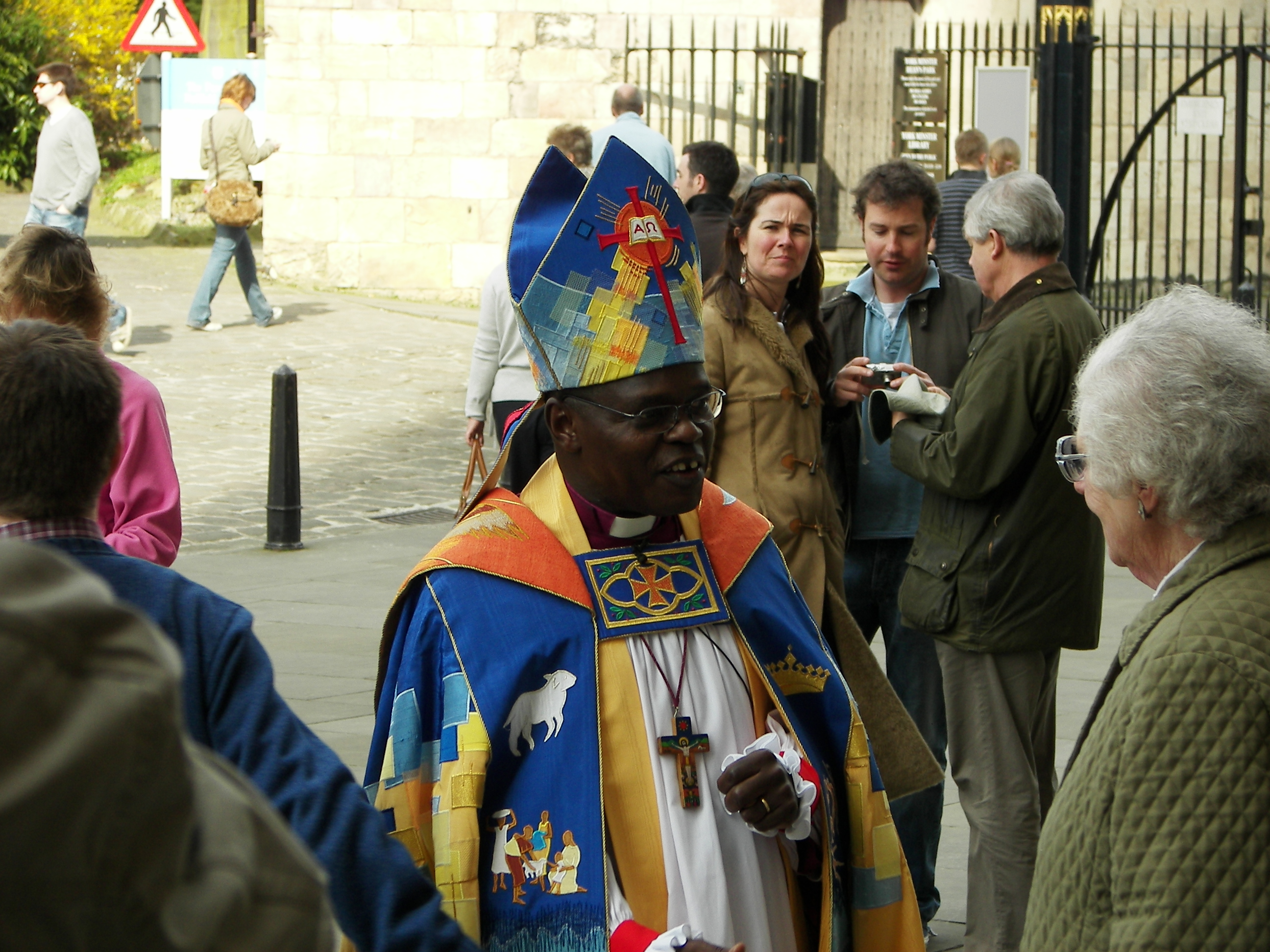
John Sentamu outside York Minster on Easter Sunday, 2007.

For a week in August 2006, Sentamu camped in York Minster, forgoing food in solidarity with those affected by the Middle East conflict, especially the children and other civilians killed and injured during the 2006 Lebanon War, when cluster bombs were used by Israeli forces.

On 7 March 2007, Sentamu was installed as the first Chancellor of York St John University. On 1 June 2007 he was appointed as the first Chancellor of the University of Cumbria. He took up the position when the university opened on 1 August 2007. In July 2009, he was awarded an honorary doctorate by University of Chester. On 15 July 2010, Sentamu was presented with an honorary degree from the University of York by the Provost of Vanbrugh College, David Efird of the Department of Philosophy, and on 16 July 2010 was presented with an honorary degree from the University of Leeds by the chancellor of the university, Melvyn Bragg.

On 16 July 2007, Sentamu was presented with an honorary degree from the University of Hull by the chancellor of the university, Virginia Bottomley, at Hull City Hall during the graduation ceremony for graduands of the Faculty of Arts and Social Sciences. On 19 July 2007 he was presented with an honorary degree (Doctor of Letters) from the University of Sheffield in recognition of his distinguished career as a scholar and theologian.

In October 2007 Sentamu was awarded the "Yorkshireman of the Year" title by the Black Sheep Brewery. In his acceptance speech he praised the welcome he had received from the people of Yorkshire and made reference to the "African-Yorkshire DNA connection", joking that perhaps his parents had this in mind when they gave him the name "Mugabi", which, spelled backwards, is "Ibagum" ("ee-by-gum", a stock phrase popularly supposed to be used to express shock or disbelief in northern England). In 2008 Archbishop Thurstan Church of England School in Hull was renamed Archbishop Sentamu Academy in his honour; it was renamed to Liberty Academy in 2025.

In October 2018, Sentamu announced his retirement, scheduled for 7 June 2020. In June 2019, he ordained his wife as a deacon.

=== Retirement ===
It was announced in the 2020 Political Honours that he would be made a life peer. On 27 April 2021 he was created Baron Sentamu, of Lindisfarne in the County of Northumberland and of Masooli in the Republic of Uganda. He took his seat among the lords temporal on 25 May, the last life peer to be introduced by Thomas Woodcock as Garter King of Arms.

Sentamu moved with his wife to Berwick and, on 14 June 2021, was licensed an honorary assistant bishop of the Diocese of Newcastle.

In May 2023, he was asked to step back from active ministry by the Bishop of Newcastle after an independent review found he failed to act on a sexual abuse disclosure. Sentamu acknowledged that he did not act on the disclosure but claimed it was not his responsibility as archbishop to deal with the disclosure as "the action following a disclosure to the bishop of Sheffield was his and his alone". He further tried to claim that the law prevented him acting:

"Safeguarding is very important but it does not trump Church Law (which is part of the Common Law of England). And the Law is not susceptible to be used as an excuse for exercising the role given to an Archbishop. Church Law sets the boundaries for Diocesan Bishops and Archbishops."

== Views ==
Sentamu has spoken on issues including young people, the family, slavery, and injustice and conflict abroad. In an early TV appearance in 1988 he joined, among others, Ray Honeyford, Ann Dummett and Lurline Champagnie to discuss "Race and the classroom" on After Dark. In November 2005 he sought re-discovery of English pride and cultural identity, stating that zeal for multiculturalism had sometimes "seemed to imply, wrongly for me, 'let other cultures be allowed to express themselves but do not let the majority culture at all tell us its glories, its struggles, its joys, its pains'." In 2006 he claimed that the BBC was frightened of criticising Islam.

In 2006, Sentamu featured prominently in the British press because of his comments on the treatment of detainees in Guantanamo Bay Naval Base.

=== Poverty ===
Sentamu regrets that many low-paid workers are not paid enough to lift them and their families out of poverty.

The issue is one that strikes to the heart of the moral fabric of our society. For the very first time the majority of households in poverty in Britain have at least one person working. The nature of poverty in Britain is changing dramatically. For millions of hard-pressed people, work is no longer a route out of poverty. (...) Low pay is a scourge on our society, and we all pay for it. Low pay costs the taxpayer between 3.6 and 6 billion pounds a year in tax credits, in-work benefits and lost tax receipts. And as disposable income available to the lowest paid reduces, so too does the demand in the economy.

Once upon a time you couldn't really be living in poverty if you had a regular income, you could find yourself on a low income, yes. But that is not longer so. You can be in work and still live in poverty.

Sentamu believes that food poverty is causing malnutrition in the UK. In 2013, he said that "last year more than 27,000 people were diagnosed as suffering from malnutrition in Leeds – not Lesotho, not Liberia, not Lusaka but Leeds?" and feels these reports "disgrace us all, leaving a dark stain on our consciences". Government welfare reforms were

"beginning to bite – with reductions in housing benefit for so-called under-occupation of social housing, the cap on benefits for workless householders and single parents, and the gradual replacement of the disability living allowance with a personal independence payment".

=== General election ===
In the run up to the 2017 United Kingdom general election, Justin Welby, the Archbishop of Canterbury, and John Sentamu campaigned over the need to address poverty, education, housing and health. The archbishops stressed the importance of "education for all, of urgent and serious solutions to our housing challenges, the importance of creating communities as well as In the run up to the 2017 United Kingdom general election, and a confident and flourishing health service that gives support to all – especially the vulnerable – not least at the beginning and end of life."

=== Stop and search ===
In 2000, Sentamu, then Bishop of Stepney, was stopped by a City of London Police officer near St Paul's Cathedral. Sentamu claimed it was the eighth time he had been questioned by police in eight years, and that he was the only Church of England bishop to have been stopped by police in this way. In a 2010 debate in the House of Lords, Sentamu was critical of the standards of "reasonable grounds to suspect" applied by police.

=== Robert Mugabe ===
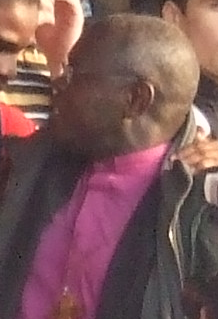
Sentamu wearing a clerical shirt without its white insert, 2009

On 9 December 2007, during a live television interview with Andrew Marr on BBC One, Sentamu made a protest against Zimbabwean president Robert Mugabe. Sentamu took the white insert off his clerical shirt and cut it up stating that:

as an Anglican, this is what I wear to identify myself that I'm a clergyman. Do you know what Mugabe has done? He's taken people's identity and literally, if you don't mind [cuts up dog collar], cut it to pieces. This is what he's actually done, to a lot of—and in the end there's nothing. So as far as I'm concerned from now on I'm not going to wear a dog collar until Mugabe's gone.

His protest followed criticism against Mugabe at the EU-Africa summit in Lisbon.

In December 2008, Sentamu again spoke out against Mugabe, saying "The time has come for Robert Mugabe to answer for his crimes against humanity, against his countrymen and women and for justice to be done". On 26 November 2017, Sentamu returned to The Andrew Marr Show and kept his promise to reinstate his dog collar following Robert Mugabe's resignation earlier in the week. Marr presented him with an envelope containing the original cut up pieces of collar. Of it he said

You know, Andrew, I could attempt to put this one back together using superglue, but it would be a pretty ropey collar. And I actually think the lesson for Zimbabwe is the same. They just can't try and stitch it up. Something more radical, something new needs to happen.

He then put on a new dog collar which he had brought with him. He also said it could be possible for Zimbabweans to forgive Mr Mugabe. "Mugabe needs to say at some point to Zimbabweans: 'Forgive me'. He's a very, very intelligent man and I think he is capable of doing it."

=== Financial crisis ===
In September 2008, Sentamu and the Archbishop of Canterbury, Rowan Williams, spoke out against opportunistic stock market trading. Sentamu compared those who practised short selling of HBOS shares, driving the share prices down, to "bank robbers".

=== Sexuality and marriage ===
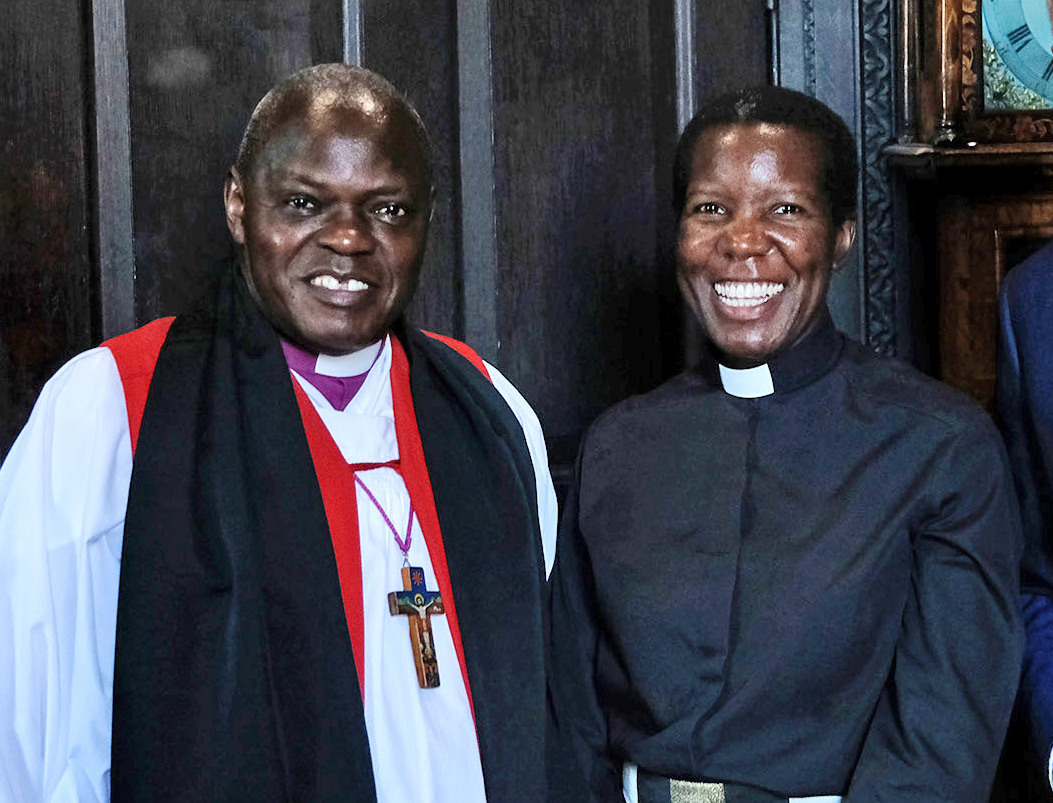
Sentamu and his daughter Grace Sentamu-Baverstock

Sentamu, born in Uganda, said laws being debated in Uganda which would impose the death penalty on homosexuals and on those supporting them were "victimising". He told the BBC that the proposed law "tends to confuse all of homosexual relationships with what you call aggravated stuff and that's the problem", but that the Anglican Communion was committed to recognising that gay people were valued by God. Previously, as area Bishop of Stepney, he was one of four English bishops who refused to sign the Cambridge Accord, an attempt in 1999 to find agreement on affirming certain human rights of homosexuals, notwithstanding differences within the church on the morality of homosexual behaviour. In 2012 he stated his opposition to government plans to legalise same-sex marriage in the United Kingdom, asserting that "Marriage is a relationship between a man and a woman, I don't think it is the role of the State to define what marriage is" and "We've seen dictators [redefine marriage] in different contexts and I don't want to redefine very clear social structures that have been in existence for a long time." At the same time, he expressed support for same-sex civil partnerships. "They [civil partnerships] are in every respect in ethical terms an honourable contract of a committed relationship."

In 2016, speaking to Piers Morgan, Sentamu said that he would not call homosexuality a 'sin' and still supported civil unions while opposing same-sex marriage. “I support civil partnerships because I think that’s a matter of equality, and a matter of fairness, but for me, it was wrong for the Government to try to redefine the nature of marriage" he said. In 2017, Sentamu spoke out in favour of a motion at General Synod to call for the government to ban the use of conversion therapy, a controversial practice meant to change a person's sexual orientation. At the same session of General Synod, Sentamu supported a motion to offer "welcome and affirmation" for transgender persons as members of the Church of England.

Commenting on Prince William and Catherine Middleton's decision to live together before their wedding, Sentamu said that the couple's public commitment to live their lives together today would be more important than their past. He said that he had conducted wedding services for "many cohabiting couples" during his time as a vicar in south London, and said, "We are living at a time where some people, as my daughter used to say, want to test whether the milk is good before they buy the cow." He also said, "For some people that's where their journeys are. But what is important, actually, is not to simply look at the past because they are going to be standing in the Abbey taking these wonderful vows: 'for better for worse; for richer for poorer; in sickness and in health; till death us do part.'"

In a speech to the House of Lords on 19 November 2007, he opposed elements of the Human Fertilisation and Embryology Bill for seeking to remove a child's "need for a father" in the IVF process. He said: "We are now faced with a Bill which is seeking to formalise the situation where the need for the ultimate male role model – that of the father – is removed in entirety."

=== National Trust Egg Hunt ===
In 2017 he criticised the National Trust for "airbrushing out" religion from the National Trust Egg Hunt.

== Other activities ==
=== Columnist ===
Sentamu has contributed to The Sun tabloid newspaper, and in 2012 he contributed to the first edition of the Sun on Sunday. All the income that he derives from journalism goes to St Leonard's Hospice in York, of which he is president.

In September 2007, Sentamu wrote in his column that the parents of the missing Madeleine McCann, were subject to a "whispering campaign" and were entitled to the presumption of innocence.

=== Public baptisms ===
On Easter Sunday 2008, Sentamu baptised 20 people by full immersion in a tank of water outside St Michael-le-Belfrey Church in York. Hundreds of people watched the ceremony.

=== Skydive for the Afghanistan Trust ===
On 6 June 2008, Sentamu completed a charity skydive from 12,500 feet with a member of the Red Devils parachute team. The dive took place over Langar Airfield in Nottinghamshire, with Sentamu aiming to raise £50,000 for the Afghanistan Trust. Yorkshire businessman Guy Brudenell had challenged Sentamu to do the jump at a charity dinner and Brudenell also took part in the jump on the day. In recognition of what was described as his "pluck", Sentamu was later given honorary membership of the Parachute Regimental Association.

Sentamu and Brudenell raised over £75,000.

=== Hull Kingston Rovers ===
On 15 April 2011, Sentamu addressed the crowd at Craven Park before the Engage Super League Rugby league match between Hull Kingston Rovers and Wigan Warriors. He asked the crowd to join him in prayer extolling the virtues of teamwork and harmony in sport. Afterwards he was presented with a Hull KR shirt.

== Safeguarding procedure complaints ==
In May 2016, Sentamu was one of six bishops accused of procedural misconduct by a survivor of child sex abuse (the accusation was to do with how the complaint was handled; none of the six was involved in the abuse). Sentamu was named in The Guardian and the Church Times alongside Peter Burrows, Steven Croft, Martyn Snow, Glyn Webster and Roy Williamson, as subject of Clergy Disciplinary Measure complaints owing to their inaction on the survivor's disclosure. The bishops contested the complaints because they were made after the church's required one-year limit. Sentamu had acknowledged receipt of a letter from the survivor with an assurance of "prayers through this testing time". But according to the Guardian report, no action was taken against the alleged abuser nor support offered to the survivor by the church. A spokesperson for the archbishop said that Sentamu had simply acknowledged a copy of a letter addressed to another bishop. "The original recipient of the letter had a duty to respond and not the archbishop", the spokesperson said. All six bishops appeared on a protest brochure which the survivor handed out at Steven Croft's enthronement as Bishop of Oxford.

In April 2018 it was reported that Sentamu and four other bishops were under investigation by South Yorkshire Police for failure to respond properly to a report of clerical child abuse. A memo from June 2013, seen by The Times and other media revealed that Sentamu had received the allegation but recommended that 'no action' be taken. The priest against whom the allegation was made died by suicide the day before he was due in court in June 2017. The Archbishop of York's office said:

The diocese of York insists that Sentamu did not fail to act on any disclosures because that responsibility lay with Ineson's local bishop, Steven Croft, who was at the time bishop of Sheffield.

A Guardian editorial contrasted Archbishop Sentamu's response to a statement from Archbishop Welby at IICSA, the Independent Inquiry into Child Sexual Abuse, in which Justin Welby stated

It is not an acceptable human response, let alone a leadership response to say “I have heard about a problem, but … it was someone else’s job to report it”.

Matt Ineson, the victim and survivor at the heart of the case, has called for the resignations of Archbishop Sentamu and Bishop Steven Croft.

In 2023, Lord Sentamu was asked by the Bishop of Newcastle to step back from active ministry as an assistant bishop in the Diocese of Newcastle "until both the findings and his response can be explored further" after an independent review criticised his failure to act after being told of Ineson's claim of abuse.

== Retirement and peerage ==
In June 2021, he was licensed as an honorary assistant bishop in the diocese of Newcastle, continuing to undertake occasional ministerial duties.

Following his retirement as Archbishop of York in 2020, Sentamu settled in Berwick-upon-tweed with his wife, Margret Sentamu. In April 2021, he was created Baron Sentamu, of Lindisfarne in the county of Northumberland and of Masooli in the Republic of Uganda, becoming a life peer and taking his seat in the House of Lords as Crossbench member.

Church of England titles
Preceded by Richard Chartres	Bishop of Stepney; 1996–2002	Succeeded by Stephen Oliver
Preceded by Mark Santer	Bishop of Birmingham; 2002–2005	Succeeded by David Urquhart
Preceded by David Hope	Archbishop of York (Primate of England); 2005–2020	Succeeded by Stephen Cottrell
