= Harold Hyde-Lees =

Anglican minister, Archdeacon of Portsmouth

Harold Montagu Hyde-Lees was Archdeacon of Portsmouth from 1937 to 1945.

Hyde-Lees was born in 1890, educated at Eton and Wadham College, Oxford and ordained in 1921. He was a curate at St Luke's, Derby and then Acting Chaplain at St Mark's English Church, Florence. After a further curacy in Falmouth he was Vicar of Looe from 1927 to 1937 when he became an Archdeacon. His last appointment was as Rector of Withycombe.

Harold Hyde-Lees died on 14 June 1963.

== Notes ==
Church of England titles
Preceded by Harold Nickinson Rodgers	Archdeacon of Portsmouth; 1937–1945	Succeeded by Arthur Leonard Kitching
