= Detainees in Iraq =

As of December 2007 there are around 50,000 detainees in Iraq, many of them untried and not accused of any crime.
