= Henry Haigh =

Archdeacon of the Isle of Wight (1837–1906)

The Ven. Canon Henry Haigh (29 June 1837 – 7 September 1906) was Archdeacon of the Isle of Wight from 1886 to 1906; and a Canon of Winchester from 1890.

Haigh was educated at Harrow and Trinity College, Cambridge. He was ordained in 1861 and began his career as an Assistant Curate at St Peter, Petersfield. He then held incumbencies in Winchester and Newport before his Archdeacon’s appointment.
