= Tony Turner (priest) =

Archdeacon of the Isle of Wight (1930–2020)

Antony Hubert Michael "Tony" Turner (17 June 1930 – 22 July 2020) was a former Archdeacon of the Isle of Wight.

Turner was educated at Royal Liberty Grammar School, Romford, Essex and Tyndale Hall, Bristol and ordained in 1957. He began his career as Curate at St Ann's, Nottingham after which he was Curate in Charge of St Cuthbert's, Cheadle. He was Vicar of Christ Church, Macclesfield from 1962 until 1968 when he became Home Secretary of the Bible Churchmen's Missionary Society. He was Vicar of St Jude's, Southsea and then Rural Dean of Portsmouth before his island appointment.

== Notes ==
Church of England titles
| Preceded by Frederick Charles Carpenter | Archdeacon of the Isle of Wight; February 1986– November 1996 | Succeeded by Kenneth Mervyn Lancelot Hadfield Banting |
