= Peter Leonard (priest) =

English Anglican priest

The Reverend Peter Leonard
- Archdeacon of the Isle of Wight
- Church: Church of England
- Province: Canterbury
- Diocese: Portsmouth
- In office: 2019–2022
- Previous post: Canon Chancellor of Portsmouth Cathedral

Orders
- Ordination: 1997 (deacon); 1998 (priest)

Personal details
- Born: Peter Philip Leonard; 6 February 1970 (age 56) Slough, Buckinghamshire, England
- Denomination: Christianity (Anglican)
- Partner: Mark Pittaway
- Education: Trinity College, Bristol

Peter Philip Leonard (born 6 February 1970) is a British Anglican priest who served as Archdeacon of the Isle of Wight, 2019–2022.

Peter was educated at Trinity College, Bristol. He was ordained deacon in 1997 and priest in 1998. He held curacies at Haslemere then Woodham. A former teacher, he was Head of School at Mill Hill Primary School in Waterlooville before resuming his ministry as a residential canon at Portsmouth Cathedral.

Peter is married to Mark. Clergy in the Church of England are permitted to be in same-sex civil partnerships based on the understanding that such relationships are celibate. He has been chair of the Board of Trustees of OneBodyOneFaith, an LGBT positive Christian charity, since 2018.

On 9 January 2022, it was announced that Leonard is to resign his Church of England appointments effective 28 February to become Chief Executive of the charity Family Links — the Centre for Emotional Health.

Church of England titles
Preceded by Peter Sutton	Archdeacon of the Isle of Wight; 2019–2022	TBA
