= Rod Green =

Roderick Ernest Alexander Green is a British Anglican Bishop in the Church of England. Since 1 May 2026, he has been Bishop of Stepney in the Diocese of London

He was previously Archdeacon of Llandaff in the Church in Wales, a role he took up in 2021.

== Early life ==
Green studied at the University of Reading and the London School of Theology, before training for the ministry at Wycliffe Hall, Oxford.

Green became the Associate Rector of St Paul's Shadwell, in 2011 and vicar of St Peter's, West Harrow, in 2014.
