= Christopher Lowson =

British Anglican bishop

The Right Reverend Christopher Lowson
- Bishop of Lincoln
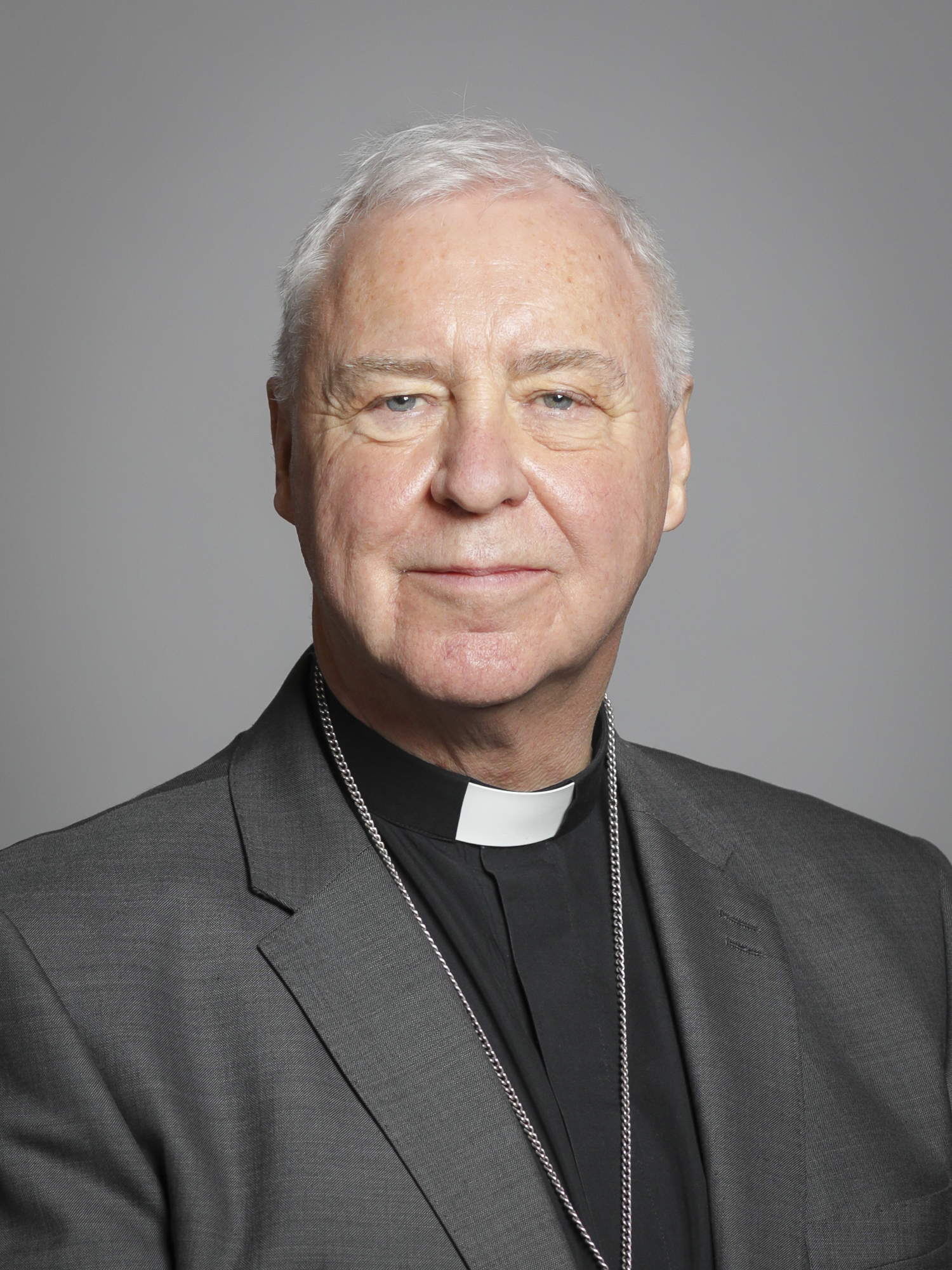
- Lowson in 2019
- Church: Church of England
- Diocese: Diocese of Lincoln
- In office: 2011–2021
- Predecessor: John Saxbee
- Other posts: Archdeacon of Portsmouth/of Portsdown (1999–2006; title changed November 1999); Director of Ministry Division (2006–2011)

Orders
- Ordination: 1977 (deacon); 1978 (priest) by Mervyn Stockwood
- Consecration: 2011

Personal details
- Born: 3 February 1953 (age 73) Consett, County Durham, United Kingdom
- Denomination: Anglican
- Residence: new bishop's house, Lincoln?-->
- Spouse: Susan Lowson
- Children: 2
- Education: King's College London

Member of the House of Lords
- Lord Spiritual
- Bishop of Lincoln; 14 September 2017 – 31 December 2021

Christopher Lowson (born 3 February 1953) is a British retired Anglican bishop. He was Bishop of Lincoln from 2011 to 2021.

== Education and ordination ==
Lowson was educated at Newcastle Cathedral School, Consett Grammar School and King's College London where he was awarded an Associateship of King's College qualification in theology in 1975. He then studied at the Pacific School of Religion in Berkeley, California, (as a World Council of Churches' scholar), where he received a Master of Sacred Theology degree in theology before being ordained in 1977. During his work Lowson studied part-time at Heythrop College, University of London, where he obtained a Master of Theology degree in pastoral theology in 1996 and, in 2003, he completed a Master of Laws degree in canon law at Cardiff Law School.

== Ordained ministry ==
Lowson was made a deacon at Petertide on 3 July 1977 and was ordained as a priest the following year, both times by Mervyn Stockwood, Bishop of Southwark, at Southwark Cathedral. He began his ordained ministry as an assistant curate in Richmond, Surrey. He was successively priest in charge (1982 to 1983) and vicar (1983 to 1991) at Holy Trinity, Eltham. From 1982 to 1985 he was also a chaplain at Avery Hill College and then of Thames Polytechnic until 1991. That year, he became vicar of Petersfield and rector of Buriton. He held this appointment for eight years, during the last four of which he was also rural dean of Petersfield. In 1999 he became Archdeacon of Portsmouth, which soon after was divided into the archdeaconries of The Meon and of Portsdown. After the split, Lowson became the Archdeacon of Portsdown and held this position until 2006. In that year he was appointed director of the Ministry Division of the Archbishops' Council and a priest vicar at Westminster Abbey, posts he held until the confirmation of his election to the See of Lincoln.

=== Episcopal ministry ===
Lowson's election as Bishop of Lincoln was confirmed at Lambeth Palace on 19 July 2011. He was consecrated as a bishop on 21 September 2011 in Westminster Abbey and enthroned in Lincoln Cathedral on 12 November 2011. He is believed to be the only steel worker ever to have been appointed a bishop. He was introduced to the House of Lords as a Lord Spiritual on 14 September 2017.

Lowson was suspended from office by Justin Welby, Archbishop of Canterbury, on 16 May 2019. According to Welby, the suspension was in relation to a safeguarding children inquiry, but "is a neutral act" and there has been "no allegation that [he] has committed abuse of a child or vulnerable adult". He accepted a misconduct penalty in relation to his mishandling of "a disclosure about a member of clergy in the Lincoln diocese in early 2019" and returned to work in February 2021.

On 31 December 2021, Lowson resigned the See of Lincoln and retired from full-time ministry. He is currently an Honorary Assistant Bishop in the Diocese of Newcastle.

== Clubs ==
He is a member of the Garrick Club, the MCC and the Savile Club.

== Styles ==
- The Reverend Chris Lowson (1978–1999)
- The Venerable Chris Lowson (1999–2011)
- The Right Reverend Christopher Lowson (2011–present)

Church of England titles
Preceded by John Saxbee	Bishop of Lincoln; 2011–2021	Succeeded by Stephen Conway
