= Bishop of Stepney =

Title in the Church of England

The Bishop of Stepney is an episcopal title used by a suffragan bishop of the Church of England Diocese of London, in the Province of Canterbury, England. The title takes its name after Stepney, an inner-city district in the London Borough of Tower Hamlets. The See was vacant since Joanne Grenfell's translation to St Edmundsbury and Ipswich on 5 September 2025. On 20 March 2026, the Venerable Rod Green, Archdeacon of Llandaff in the Church in Wales, was announced as the next bishop. He was consecrated on 1 May 2026 at St Paul’s Cathedral.

== History ==
The first bishop was appointed to take responsibility for North and East London, which had been under the care of the Bishop of Bedford; the new See was erected because the retiring bishop Robert Billing retained the See of Bedford, and Stepney was a more obvious See for the suffragan for the East End. In 1898, the new Bishop of Islington received responsibility for North London. In the experimental area scheme of 1970, the bishop was given oversight of the deaneries of Tower Hamlets, Hackney, and Islington. The Bishops suffragan of Stepney have been area bishops since the London area scheme was founded in 1979.

== List of bishops ==
Bishops of Stepney
From	Until	Incumbent	Notes
1895	1897	George Forrest Browne	(1833–1930). Translated to Bristol
1897	1901	Arthur Winnington-Ingram	(1858–1946). Translated to London
1901	1909	Cosmo Gordon Lang	(1864–1945). Translated to York, and later to Canterbury
1909	1919	Luke Paget	(1853–1937). Formerly Bishop of Ipswich. Translated to Chester
1919	1928	Henry Mosley	(1868–1948). Translated to Southwell
1928	1936	Charles Curzon	(1878–1954). Translated to Exeter
1936	1952	Robert Moberly	(1884–1978)
1952	1957	Joost de Blank	(1908–1968)
1957	1968	Evered Lunt	(1900–1982)
1968	1978	Trevor Huddleston	(1913–1998). Translated to Mauritius
1978	1991	Jim Thompson	(1936–2003). First area bishop from 1979; translated to Bath and Wells
1992	1995	Richard Chartres	(b. 1947). Consecrated on 22 May 1992. Translated to London in 1995
1996	2002	John Sentamu	(b. 1949). Translated to Birmingham, and later to York
2003	2010	Stephen Oliver	(b. 1948) Retired 6 July 2010
2010	2011	Pete Broadbent; Bishop of Willesden	Acted as Bishop of Stepney from 7 July 2010, effectively suspended from 23 November 2010 to 10 January 2011, resumed as Acting Bishop until 22 July 2011.
2011	2018	Adrian Newman	(b. 1958) Resigned on 31 October 2018 on health grounds.
2018	2019	Pete Broadbent, Bishop of Willesden	Acting as Bishop of Stepney from 31 October 2018 until Grenfell's consecration.
2019	2025	Joanne Grenfell	From 3 July 2019 consecration until 5 September 2025 translation to St Edmundsbury and Ipswich
2025	incumbent	Rod Green	Consecrated 1 May 2026 in St Paul's Cathedral. Previously Archdeacon of Llandaff in the Church in Wales.
