= Geoffrey Tiarks =

British Anglican bishop (1909–1987)

Geoffrey Lewis Tiarks (8 October 1909 – 13 January 1987) was a British Anglican bishop. He was the Bishop of Maidstone in the latter part of the 20th century.

== Early life and education ==
Born into an ecclesiastical family on 8 October 1909, his father was Lewis Hermann Tiarks, some time Rector of Lerwick (in the Scottish Episcopal Church). He was educated at Marlborough College and St John's College, Cambridge.

== Ordained ministry ==
Tiarks was ordained in the Church of England: made deacon in Advent 1932 (18 December) and ordained priest the following Advent (17 December 1933), both times by Richard Parsons, Bishop of Southwark at Southwark Cathedral. He served his a curacy at St Peter's Church, Walworth. He was for many years a Royal Navy military chaplain. Following this, he served the Anglican Church in Rondebosch, South Africa, from 1950 to 1953. He then returned to England, and was Vicar of Lyme Regis until 1961. He served as Archdeacon of the Isle of Wight to 1965 and finally (before his appointment to the episcopate), as Archdeacon of Portsmouth.

Tiarks was consecrated a bishop on 25 January 1969, by Michael Ramsey, Archbishop of Canterbury, at Westminster Abbey. He served as Bishop of Maidstone, a suffragan bishop of the Diocese of Canterbury, until his retirement on 30 September 1976; until 1974 he was also Senior Chaplain at Lambeth Palace (to Ramsey as Archbishop of Canterbury).

== Personal life ==
He married Betty Lyne Stock in Malta whilst a naval chaplain and they had a son, Robert, and a daughter, Susan. They retired to Dorset in 1976; he died on 14 January 1987, survived by Betty.

He was second-cousin to John Tiarks (Bishop of Chelmsford, 1962–1971). Through his first cousin once removed Anne, the bishop was a first cousin twice removed to Mark Phillips, and one of the godfathers of Mark's son Peter, the eldest grandchild of Elizabeth II.

Church of England titles
Vacant Title last held by Stanley Betts	Bishop of Maidstone; 1969–1976	Succeeded by Richard Third
