= Canonical election =

Canon law of the Catholic Church

A canonical election, in the canon law of the Latin Church of the Catholic Church, is the designation of a suitable candidate to a vacant ecclesiastical office by a vote of a collegial body. One example for a canonical election would be the election of a pope by the cardinals in the conclave.

Usually confirmation of the election by a competent authority is required. The competent authority cannot withhold confirmation if the designated candidate is canonically suitable for the office and the election has been conducted validly.
