= Archdeacon of Westmorland and Furness =

Church of England ecclesiastical office

The Archdeacon of Westmorland and Furness is a senior ecclesiastical officer within the Diocese of Carlisle. They are responsible for the disciplinary supervision of the clergy within its four rural deaneries: Barrow, Windermere, Kendal and Furness.

The archdeaconry of Westmorland was erected by Order-in-Council of 10 August 1847 from the Archdeaconry of Richmond, but that Order did not come into effect until Hugh Percy (Bishop of Carlisle) died on the 5th of February 1856 (because he did not consent to the changes to his diocese). The Archdeaconry of Furness was erected by further Order-in-Council in 1884; they were subsequently merged to form the current archdeaconry of Westmorland and Furness. The incumbent is Vernon Ross.

== Archdeacons of Westmorland and of Westmorland and Furness ==
- 1856–January 1865 (ret.): Robert Evans (first archdeacon)
- 1865–25 July 1896 (d.): John Cooper, Vicar of Kendal
- 1896–1901 (res.): John Diggle, Vicar of Mossley Hill until 1897
- 1901–1 March 1915 (d.): William Sherwen, Rector of Dean
- 1915–1923 (res.): Campbell West-Watson, Bishop suffragan of Barrow-in-Furness and, from 1921, Rector of Aldingham (became Archdeacon of Furness)
- 1923–1931 (ret.): Henry Lafone, Vicar of Kendal
- 1931–1944: John Hopkinson, Vicar of Christ Church, Cockermouth (son of Alfred Hopkinson)
- 1944–1 July 1946 (d.): Harold Mulliner, Vicar of Winster
- 1947–1951 (res.): Hubert Wilkinson, Vicar of Winster until 1948, then Vicar of Ambleside with Rydal (became Archdeacon of Liverpool)
- 1951–1965 (res.): Cyril Bulley, Vicar of Ambleside with Rydal until 1959, then Bishop suffragan of Penrith

In 1959, Furness archdeaconry was merged into Westmorland archdeaconry and the latter was renamed as "Westmorland and Furness".

- 1965–1971 (res.): Richard Hare, Vicar of St George with St Luke, Barrow until 1969, then Vicar of Winster (became Bishop suffragan of Pontefract)
- 1971–1977 (res.): Walter Ewbank, Vicar of Winster
- 1978–1983 (res.): Arthur Attwell, Vicar of St John's, Windermere until 1982 (became Bishop of Sodor and Man)
- 1983–1989 (res.): Peter Vaughan (became area Bishop of Ramsbury)
- 1989–1995 (ret.): Lawrie Peat (afterwards archdeacon emeritus)
- 1995–1999 (ret.): David Jenkins (afterwards archdeacon emeritus)
- 2000–2011 (res.): George Howe (afterwards archdeacon emeritus)
- 2012–2016 (ret.): Penny Driver
- 25 February 2017 – present: Vernon Ross

== Archdeacons of Furness ==
The archdeaconry (occasionally called Barrow-in-Furness) was created by Order-in-Council on 27 May 1884.

- 1884–1893 (res.): Arthur Crosse, Vicar of St George's, Barrow
- 1893–1901 (res.): Thompson Phillips, Vicar of St George's, Barrow
- 1901–1905 (res.): Cecil Boutflower, Vicar of St George's, Barrow
- 1905–1912 (res.): Herbert Campbell, Vicar of St George's, Barrow
- 1912–1923 (res.): Henry Lafone, Vicar of St George's, Barrow until 1919, then Vicar of Cartmel
- 1923–1926 (res.): Campbell West-Watson, Bishop suffragan of Barrow and Rector of Aldingham
- 1926–1 August 1944 (d.): Godfrey Smith, Vicar of Haverthwaite
- 1944–1958 (ret.): Herbert Turner, Bishop suffragan of Penrith and, until 1955, Vicar of Hawkshead

On 7 August 1959, Furness archdeaconry was dissolved and its territory added to the Westmorland archdeaconry, which was renamed "Westmorland and Furness".
