= List of bishops in the Church of England =

Key
Active bishop	Male bishop
Inactive bishop	Female bishop
Position vacant	

The active bishops of the Church of England are usually either diocesan bishops or suffragan bishops. Several also hold portfolios of national responsibility, either as spokesperson bishops for the Church of England or as Lords Spiritual in the House of Lords.

Bishops are generally required to retire at age 70, but may continue in office for longer (up to a maximum of 75) by direction of their superior (the archbishop for diocesan bishops, the diocesan bishop for suffragan bishops).

== Diocesan bishops ==
As there are 42 dioceses of the Church of England, there are 42 bishops diocesan (including vacancies). Of the 42: both archbishops and the Bishops of London, of Durham and of Winchester, sit in the House of Lords as Lords Spiritual ex officio; a further 21 sit there by seniority (of whom eight had their seniority accelerated); the Bishop of Sodor and Man sits ex officio in the Legislative Council of the Isle of Man and also in Tynwald Court; fourteen diocesans are not currently Lords Spiritual; and the Bishop in Europe is ineligible to be a Lord Spiritual.

=== Lords Spiritual ex officio ===
Bishop	Person	Birth date and age	Election confirmed (Note: The date the person's election to their current see was confirmed.)	Consecrated (Note: The date the person was consecrated as an Anglican bishop.)	Introduced (Note: The date(s) the person was introduced in the House of Lords.)
The Archbishop of Canterbury	Sarah Mullally	26 March 1962 (age 64)	28 January 2026	22 July 2015	24 May 2018 (London); 5 February 2026 (Canterbury)
The Archbishop of York	Stephen Cottrell	31 August 1958 (age 68)	9 July 2020	4 May 2004 (Note: Cottrell was consecrated in 2004 to serve as area Bishop of Reading, translated to Chelmsford on 6 October 2010, and translated to York on 9 July 2020.)	25 March 2014 (Chelmsford); 22 October 2020 (York)
The Bishop of London	Vacant since 28 January 2026				
The Bishop of Durham	Rick Simpson	5 July 1966 (age 60)	29 April 2026	30 April 2026	26 October 2026
The Bishop of Winchester	Philip Mounstephen	13 July 1959 (age 67)	10 October 2023 (Note: Mounstephen was translated to Winchester upon the confirmation of his election at St Mary-le-Bow on 10 October 2023.)	30 November 2018 (Note: Mounstephen was consecrated as Bishop of Truro in 2018.)	12 December 2023

=== Lords Spiritual by virtue of seniority of service ===
Until 2015, the 21 longest-serving among the remaining diocesan bishops were eligible to sit in the House of Lords as Lords Spiritual. Since women became eligible as bishops in 2015, female diocesan bishops take precedence over male ones whenever a new vacancy in the Lords arises, in accordance with the Lords Spiritual (Women) Act 2015 (originally in force until 17 May 2025, extended in 2025 by five more years until 18 May 2030).

Bishop	Person	Birth date and age	Election confirmed	Consecrated	Introduced
The Bishop of Gloucester	Rachel Treweek (Note: Accelerated in accordance with the Lords Spiritual (Women) Act 2015.)	4 February 1963 (age 63)	15 June 2015	22 July 2015	26 October 2015
The Bishop of Derby	Libby Lane (Note: Lane has the distinction of being the first woman consecrated into bishop's orders in the Church of England (as Bishop suffragan of Stockport in 2015). Hartley was a priest of the Church of England consecrated bishop in 2014 in the Anglican Church in Aotearoa, New Zealand and Polynesia.) (Note: Lane has stepped back from diocesan duties while on sick leave.)	8 December 1966 (age 59)	11 February 2019	26 January 2015	2 July 2019
The Bishop of Manchester, Convenor of the Lords Spiritual	David Walker (Note: Walker is to retire effective 31 July 2027.)	30 May 1957 (age 69)	7 October 2013	30 November 2000 (Note: Walker was consecrated as area Bishop of Dudley in 2000.)	7 September 2020
The Bishop of Chelmsford	Guli Francis-Dehqani	18 June 1966 (age 60)	11 March 2021	30 November 2017 (Note: Francis-Dehqani was consecrated as Bishop suffragan of Loughborough in 2017.)	1 November 2021
The Bishop of Southwell and Nottingham	Paul Williams	16 January 1968 (age 58)	11 May 2015	25 March 2009	13 June 2022
The Bishop of Leicester	Martyn Snow	25 January 1968 (age 58)	22 February 2016	25 September 2013	8 November 2022
The Bishop of Sheffield	Pete Wilcox	10 October 1961 (age 65)	5 June 2017	22 June 2017	14 March 2023
The Bishop of Newcastle	Helen-Ann Hartley	28 May 1973 (age 53)	3 February 2023	22 February 2014	26 October 2023
The Bishop of Norwich	Graham Usher	11 September 1970 (age 56)	17 June 2019	25 March 2014	26 October 2023
The Bishop of Hereford	Richard Jackson	22 January 1961 (age 65)	7 January 2020	14 May 2014	23 January 2024
The Bishop of Peterborough	Debbie Sellin	1 October 1964 (age 62)	13 December 2023	3 July 2019	30 January 2025
The Bishop of Chester	Mark Tanner	November 1970 (age 55–56)	15 July 2020	18 October 2016	17 July 2025
The Bishop of Coventry	Sophie Jelley	1972 (age 53–54)	14 February 2025	21 September 2020 (morning)	4 September 2025
The Bishop of Portsmouth	Jonathan Frost	26 September 1964 (age 62)	18 January 2022	30 November 2010	23 October 2025
The Bishop of St Edmundsbury and Ipswich	Joanne Grenfell	27 May 1972 (age 54)	5 September 2025	3 July 2019	5 February 2026
The Bishop of Salisbury	Stephen Lake (Note: Lake is currently suspended from ministry.)	17 December 1963 (age 62)	1 April 2022	25 April 2022	TBA
The Bishop of Ely	Sarah Clark	21 April 1965 (age 61)	17 April 2026	27 February 2019	10 December 2026
The Bishop of Rochester	Jonathan Gibbs	6 May 1961 (age 65)	24 May 2022	17 October 2014	29 October 2026
The Bishop of Bath and Wells	Michael Beasley	1968 (age 57–58)	29 June 2022	14 May 2015	27 October 2026
The Bishop of Blackburn	Philip North (Note: It was announced on 31 January 2017 that North was nominated to become Bishop of Sheffield; on 9 March, North withdrew his acceptance of the nomination.)	2 December 1966 (age 59)	25 April 2023	2 February 2015	23 November 2026
The Bishop of Birmingham	Michael Volland	2 May 1974 (age 52)	22 November 2023	30 November 2023	1 December 2026

=== Other diocesan bishops ===
Bishop	Person	Birth date and age	Election confirmed	Consecrated
The Bishop to the Archbishops of Canterbury and York (ad interim) (Note: The Bishop to the Archbishops is neither a diocesan (they cannot be a Lord Spiritual) nor a suffragan bishop, but ranks highly as episcopal chief of staff to the Archbishops of Canterbury (at Lambeth Palace) and of York (at Bishopthorpe) and Urquhart is a retired diocesan bishop; unlike the holders of the predecessor office Bishop at Lambeth, Urquhart has not been appointed Bishop to the Forces, so he does not have a seat in the House of Bishops.)	David Urquhart	14 April 1952 (age 74)	Appointed February 2023	2000
The Bishop in Europe (Note: The Bishops of Sodor and Man and in Europe are ineligible to be Lords Spiritual; the Bishop of Sodor and Man is, however, ex officio a member of the Manx Legislative Council.)	Robert Innes	1959 (age 66–67)	Not elected	20 July 2014
The Bishop of Sodor and Man	Tricia Hillas	1966 (age 59–60)	23 September 2024 (letters patent)	10 October 2024
The Bishop of Exeter	Mike Harrison	7 March 1963 (age 63)	25 September 2024	24 February 2016
The Bishop of Truro	David Williams	16 April 1961 (age 65)	28 March 2025	19 September 2014
The Bishop of Carlisle	Rob Saner-Haigh	20 February 1973 (age 53)	1 September 2025	15 July 2022
The Bishop of Worcester, The Bishop to the Forces	Hugh Nelson	1972 (age 53–54)	28 November 2025; 20 September 2021 (Forces)	15 July 2020 (morning)
The Bishop of St Albans	Andrew Rumsey	11 February 1968 (age 58)	9 June 2026	25 January 2019
The Bishop of Leeds	Toby Howarth	12 July 1962 (age 64)	6 November 2026	17 October 2014
The Bishop of Liverpool	Vacant since 31 July 2025			
The Bishop of Bristol	Vacant since 1 September 2025			
The Bishop of Guildford	Vacant since 3 March 2026			
The Bishop of Chichester	Vacant since 1 April 2026			
The Bishop of Oxford	Vacant since 1 August 2026			
The Bishop of Southwark	Vacant since 5 August 2026			
The Bishop of Lichfield	Vacant since 1 October 2026			
The Bishop of Lincoln	Vacant since 2 October 2026			

=== Acting diocesan bishops ===
Acting diocesan bishops, properly called episcopal commissaries, are referred to by a wide variety of informal titles. For simplicity, this article generally refers to the Acting Bishop of Somewhere.

Acting bishop	Person	Birth date and age	Acting since	Consecration
Interim Bishop of Liverpool, The Bishop of Wigan	Ruth Worsley (Note: Attends the House of Bishops.)	1962 (age 63–64)	4 April 2025 (translated to Wigan)	29 September 2015
Acting Bishop of Bristol, The Bishop of Swindon	Neil Warwick	1964 (age 61–62)	2 September 2025	30 November 2023
Acting Bishop of London, The area Bishop of Kensington	Emma Ineson	1969 (age 56–57)	28 January 2026	27 February 2019 (Note: Ineson was consecrated as Bishop of Penrith in 2019 and became Bishop to the Archbishops on 1 June 2021.)
Acting Bishop of Lincoln, The Bishop of Grantham	Nicholas Chamberlain	25 November 1963 (age 62)	20 February 2026	19 November 2015
Acting Bishop of Guildford, The Bishop of Dorking	Paul Davies	15 March 1973 (age 53)	3 March 2026	29 September 2023
Acting Bishop of Salisbury, The Bishop of Sherborne	Karen Gorham (Note: Elected suffragan member of the House of Bishops for the 2021–2026 Convocations.)	24 June 1964 (age 62)	10 April 2026	24 February 2016
Acting Bishop of Derby	Jackie Searle	26 September 1960 (age 66)	1 May 2026	27 September 2018
Acting Bishop of Chichester; The Bishop of Lewes	Will Hazlewood	1971 (age 54–55)	1 June 2026	15 July 2020
Acting Bishop of Oxford, The area Bishop of Dorchester	Gavin Collins	31 December 1966 (age 59)	1 August 2026	14 April 2021
Acting Bishop of Southwark, The area Bishop of Croydon	Rosemarie Mallett	1959 (age 66–67)	5 August 2026	24 June 2022
Acting Bishop of Lichfield, The area Bishop of Shrewsbury	Sarah Bullock	17 March 1964 (age 62)	1 October 2026	3 July 2019

== Suffragan bishops ==
As of 1 May 2022, there are 73 bishops suffragan. Of the 73: one, the Bishop of Dover, acts as a diocesan bishop; one, the Bishop of Islington, has a national role (though often focused in London); five bishops provide Alternative Episcopal Oversight (to parishes who reject the presbyteral and/or episcopal ministry of women); 20 are area bishops; and the remaining 46 are deployed in suffragan roles across their diocese (or have informal portfolios or geographical responsibility).

Diocese	Bishop	Person	Birth date and age	Took office (Note: The date the person took up office in their current suffragan role; for suffragans in their first see, this date is the same as their consecration.)	Consecrated
Canterbury	The Bishop of Dover	Rose Hudson-Wilkin	19 January 1961 (age 65)	19 November 2019 (consecration)	19 November 2019
Manchester	The Bishop of Middleton	Mark Davies	12 May 1962 (age 64)	25 April 2008 (consecrated)	25 April 2008
London AEO	The Bishop of Fulham	Jonathan Baker	6 October 1966 (age 60)	13 February 2013 (translated)	16 June 2011 (Note: Baker was consecrated as Bishop suffragan of Ebbsfleet (PEV) in 2011.)
St Albans	The Bishop of Bedford	Richard Atkinson (Note: Atkinson is to retire effective 31 December 2026.)	17 December 1958 (age 67)	17 May 2012 (consecrated)	17 May 2012
Lichfield	The area Bishop of Wolverhampton	Tim Wambunya	1966 (age 59–60)	15 October 2024 (installation)	6 October 2013
Chelmsford	The area Bishop of Colchester	Roger Morris	18 July 1968 (age 58)	25 July 2014 (consecrated)	25 July 2014
Liverpool	The Bishop of Wigan, Interim Bishop of Liverpool	Ruth Worsley	1962 (age 63–64)	4 April 2025 (letters patent)	29 September 2015 (Taunton)
Lincoln	The Bishop of Grantham, Acting Bishop of Lincoln	Nicholas Chamberlain	25 November 1963 (age 62)	19 November 2015 (consecrated)	19 November 2015
Salisbury	The Bishop of Sherborne, Acting Bishop of Salisbury	Karen Gorham	24 June 1964 (age 62)	24 February 2016 (consecrated)	24 February 2016
Gloucester	The Bishop of Tewkesbury	Robert Springett	15 September 1962 (age 64)	30 November 2016 (consecrated)	30 November 2016
York	The Bishop of Hull	Eleanor Sanderson	1977 (age 48–49)	22 September 2022	2 June 2017
Blackburn	The Bishop of Lancaster	Jill Duff	1972 (age 53–54)	29 June 2018 (consecration)	29 June 2018
Rochester	The Bishop of Tonbridge	Simon Burton-Jones	23 December 1962 (age 63)	3 July 2018 (consecration)	3 July 2018
London	The area Bishop of Kensington, Acting Bishop of London	Emma Ineson	1969 (age 56–57)	19 February 2023 (oaths)	27 February 2019 (Note: Ineson was consecrated as Bishop of Penrith in 2019 and became Bishop to the Archbishops on 1 June 2021.)
Lichfield	The area Bishop of Shrewsbury, Acting Bishop of Lichfield	Sarah Bullock	17 March 1964 (age 62)	3 July 2019 (consecration)	3 July 2019
Worcester	The Bishop of Dudley	Martin Gorick	23 June 1962 (age 64)	28 January 2020 (consecration)	28 January 2020
Chichester	The Bishop of Horsham	Ruth Bushyager	1977 (age 48–49)	15 July 2020 (consecration)	15 July 2020 (morning)
Chichester	The Bishop of Lewes, Acting Bishop of Chichester	Will Hazlewood	1971 (age 54–55)	15 July 2020 (consecration)	15 July 2020 (afternoon)
Southwell and Nottingham	The Bishop of Sherwood	Andy Emerton	1972 (age 53–54)	21 September 2020 (consecration)	21 September 2020 (afternoon)
Newcastle	The Bishop of Berwick	Mark Wroe	1969 (age 56–57)	5 January 2021 (consecration)	5 January 2021
Oxford	The area Bishop of Dorchester, Acting Bishop of Oxford	Gavin Collins	31 December 1966 (age 59)	14 April 2021 (consecration)	14 April 2021
Lichfield	The area Bishop of Stafford	Matthew Parker	1 June 1963 (age 63)	14 April 2021 (consecration)	14 April 2021
Norwich	The Bishop of Lynn	Jane Steen	1964 (age 61–62)	23 June 2021 (consecration)	23 June 2021
Chester	The Bishop of Birkenhead	Julie Conalty	1963 (age 62–63)	19 July 2021 (consecration)	19 July 2021
Chester	The Bishop of Stockport	Sam Corley	1976 (age 49–50)	19 July 2021 (consecration)	19 July 2021
Chelmsford	The area Bishop of Barking	Lynne Cullens	1964 (age 61–62)	25 January 2022 (consecration)	25 January 2022
Leicester	The Bishop of Loughborough	Saju Muthalaly	1979 (age 46–47)	25 January 2022 (consecration)	25 January 2022
London	The area Bishop of Willesden	Lusa Nsenga-Ngoy	1977 (age 48–49)	25 January 2022 (consecration)	25 January 2022
Southwark	The area Bishop of Croydon, Acting Bishop of Southwark	Rosemarie Mallett	1959 (age 66–67)	24 June 2022 (consecration)	24 June 2022
Leeds	The Bishop of Kirkstall	Arun Arora	1971 (age 54–55)	15 July 2022 (consecration)	15 July 2022
Exeter	The Bishop of Plymouth	James Grier	aged c. 47	29 September 2022 (consecration)	29 September 2022
York AEO	The Bishop of Beverley	Stephen Race	1969 (age 56–57)	30 November 2022 (consecration)	30 November 2022
Lichfield AEO	The Bishop of Oswestry	Paul Thomas	1975 (age 50–51)	2 February 2023 (consecration)	2 February 2023
Southwark	The area Bishop of Kingston	Martin Gainsborough	1966 (age 59–60)	2 February 2023 (consecration)	2 February 2023
St Albans	The Bishop of Hertford	Jane Mainwaring	1970 (age 55–56)	2 February 2023 (consecration)	2 February 2023
Canterbury AEO	The Bishop of Ebbsfleet	Rob Munro	1963 (age 62–63)	2 February 2023 (consecration)	2 February 2023
Leeds	The area Bishop of Huddersfield	Smitha Prasadam	1964 (age 61–62)	22 June 2023 (consecration)	22 June 2023
Manchester	The Bishop of Bolton	Matthew Porter	1969 (age 56–57)	22 June 2023 (consecration)	22 June 2023
Leeds	The area Bishop of Ripon	Anna Eltringham	1974 (age 51–52)	22 June 2023 (consecration)	22 June 2023
Norwich	The Bishop of Thetford	Ian Bishop	13 November 1962 (age 64)	29 September 2023 (consecration)	29 September 2023
Chelmsford	The area Bishop of Bradwell	Adam Atkinson	1967 (age 58–59)	29 September 2023 (consecration)	29 September 2023
Guildford	The Bishop of Dorking, Acting Bishop of Guildford	Paul Davies	15 March 1973 (age 53)	29 September 2023 (consecration)	29 September 2023
Bristol	The Bishop of Swindon, Acting Bishop of Bristol	Neil Warwick	1964 (age 61–62)	30 November 2023 (consecration)	30 November 2023
London	The area Bishop of Edmonton	Anderson Jeremiah	1975 (age 50–51)	25 April 2024 (consecration)	25 April 2024
Southwark	The area Bishop of Woolwich	Alastair Cutting	May 29, 1960 (age 66)	3 July 2024 (consecration)	3 July 2024
Blackburn	The Bishop of Burnley	Joe Kennedy	1969 (age 56–57)	19 July 2024 (consecration)	19 July 2024
York	The Bishop of Selby	Flora Winfield	1964 (age 61–62)	10 October 2024 (consecration)	10 October 2024
York	The Bishop of Whitby	Barry Hill	1979 (age 46–47)	10 October 2024 (consecration)	10 October 2024
Winchester	The Bishop of Southampton	Rhiannon King	1972 (age 53–54)	18 October 2024 (consecration)	18 October 2024
Birmingham	The Bishop of Aston	Esther Prior	1973 (age 52–53)	27 February 2025 (consecration)	27 February 2025 (morning)
Europe	The Suffragan Bishop in Europe	Andrew Norman	1963 (age 62–63)	27 February 2025 (consecration)	27 February 2025 (morning)
Oxford	The area Bishop of Buckingham	Dave Bull	1972 (age 53–54)	27 February 2025 (consecration)	27 February 2025 (morning)
Oxford	The area Bishop of Reading	Mary Gregory	1970 (age 55–56)	27 February 2025 (consecration)	27 February 2025 (morning)
Canterbury AEO	The Bishop of Richborough	Luke Irvine-Capel	1975 (age 50–51)	27 February 2025 (consecration)	27 February 2025 (afternoon)
Leeds	The area Bishop of Wakefield	Malcolm Chamberlain	1 December 1969 (age 56)	11 June 2025 (consecration)	11 June 2025 (announced)
Exeter	The Bishop of Crediton	Moira Astin	18 February 1965 (age 61)	3 July 2025 (consecration)	3 July 2025
Sheffield	The Bishop of Doncaster	Leah Vasey-Saunders	1977 (age 48–49)	16 September 2025 (consecration)	16 September 2025
Winchester	The Bishop of Basingstoke	Kelly Betteridge	1969 (age 56–57)	15 October 2025 (consecration)	15 October 2025
Lincoln	The Bishop of Grimsby	Jean Burgess	10 June 1962 (age 64)	6 February 2026 (consecration)	6 February 2026
Bath and Wells	The Bishop of Taunton	Fiona Gibson	1970 (age 55–56)	6 February 2026 (consecration)	6 February 2026
Carlisle	The Bishop of Penrith	Michael Leyden	12 December 1985 (age 40)	30 April 2026 (consecration)	30 April 2026
Liverpool	The Bishop of Warrington	Simon Robinson	17 August 1967 (age 59)	30 April 2026 (consecration)	30 April 2026
London	The area Bishop of Stepney	Rod Green	29 May 1974 (age 52)	1 May 2026 (consecration)	1 May 2026
Truro	The Bishop of St Germans	James Treasure	1975 (age 50–51)	1 May 2026 (consecration)	1 May 2026
Peterborough	The Bishop of Brixworth	Alex Hughes	3 October 1975 (age 51)	16 July 2026 (consecration)	16 July 2026
Coventry	The Bishop of Warwick	Timothy Lomax		6 November 2026 (consecration)	6 November 2026 postponed
Durham	The Bishop of Jarrow	Jitesh Patel		8 December 2026 (consecration)	8 December 2026
St Edmundsbury and Ipswich	The Bishop of Dunwich	Vacant since 25 September 2024			
London	The Bishop of Islington, national bishop for church plants	Vacant since 30 November 2025			
Derby	The Bishop of Repton	Vacant since 1 May 2026			
Ely	The Bishop of Huntingdon	Vacant since 30 May 2026			
Salisbury	The Bishop of Ramsbury	Vacant since 9 June 2026			
Leeds	The area Bishop of Bradford	Vacant since 6 November 2026			

== Other bishops ==
As of 15 October 2024, there are sixteen people in active ministry (i.e. not retired) in the Church of England who are in episcopal orders but not in episcopal posts in the Church of England.

- Jonathan Ruhumuliza, former Bishop of Cameroon (Church of the Province of West Africa) and of Kigali (Anglican Church of Rwanda; consecrated 1991), has been in parish ministry in England since 2005
- Pete Broadbent, former Bishop of Willesden (consecrated 2001), has been Bishop's Adviser (2030 Vision) in the Diocese of London since 1 October 2021.
- Saulo Barros, former Bishop of The Amazon (Anglican Episcopal Church of Brazil; consecrated 2006) is Priest-in-Charge of St Martin's Church, Plaistow.
- Humphrey Southern, former Bishop of Repton (consecrated 2007) has been Principal of Ripon College Cuddesdon since 2015
- Anthony Poggo, former Bishop of Kajo-Keji (Episcopal Church of South Sudan; consecrated 2007), has been based at Lambeth Palace since 2016: as the Archbishop of Canterbury's Advisor on Anglican Communion Affairs until 2022 and as Secretary General of the Anglican Consultative Council since
- Christopher Cocksworth, former Bishop of Coventry (consecrated 2008), has been Dean of Windsor since 2023
- Mark Sowerby, former Bishop of Horsham (consecrated 2009), has been Principal of the College of the Resurrection, Mirfield, since 2019
- Mark Rylands, former Bishop of Shrewsbury (consecrated 2009), has been a parish priest in Devon since 2018
- Chris Goldsmith, former Bishop of St Germans (consecrated 2013), has been based at Church House, Westminster as national Director of Ministry since 2019
- Rob Gillion, former Bishop of Riverina (Anglican Church of Australia; consecrated 2014), has been Vicar of Streatham Christ Church and Associate Bishop for the Arts in the Diocese of Southwark since 2020
- Graham Tomlin, former area Bishop of Kensington (consecrated 2015), has been leading the Centre for Cultural Witness since 2022
- Rob Wickham, former area Bishop of Edmonton (consecrated 2015), has been the CEO of Church Urban Fund since July 2023.
- Anne Hollinghurst, former Bishop of Aston (consecrated 2015), has been Principal of The Queen's Foundation, Edgbaston, and an honorary assistant bishop in the neighbouring Diocese of Lichfield (and member of that diocese's House of Bishops) since September 2024.
- Jan McFarlane, former Bishop of Repton (consecrated 2016), has been Dean of Lichfield since 2024.
- Jo Bailey Wells, former Bishop of Dorking (consecrated 2016), has been "Bishop for Episcopal Ministry" at the Anglican Communion Office since January 2023.
- Anthony Ball, part-time bishop (consecrated 2021) in the Episcopal/Anglican Province of Alexandria. is a Canon of Westminster and has been Director of the Anglican Centre in Rome and Archbishop of Canterbury's Representative to the Holy See since 2025.

== House of Bishops ==
The membership of the General Synod's House of Bishops is:

- All 42 bishops diocesan (or as many as are in post)
- The Bishop suffragan of Dover (as a quasi-diocesan bishop; Rose Hudson-Wilkin, since 2019) and the Bishop to the Forces (Hugh Nelson, Bishop of Worcester; since 2021)
- 9 bishops suffragan (5 from Canterbury province; 4 from York) elected by and from among all the bishops suffragan.

The following have been elected to serve in the Convocations for 2021–2026:

1. Martin Gorick, Bishop suffragan of Dudley (since 2021)
2. Jill Duff, Bishop suffragan of Lancaster (since 2022)
3. Julie Conalty, Bishop suffragan of Birkenhead (since 2023)
4. Stephen Race, Bishop suffragan of Beverley (since 2023)
5. Jonathan Baker, Bishop suffragan of Fulham (since 2025)
6. Robert Springett, Bishop suffragan of Tewkesbury (since 2026)
7. Karen Gorham, Bishop suffragan of Sherborne (since 2026)
8. one southern vacancy vice Hollinghurst
9. one northern vacancy vice Mason

Acting diocesan bishops (commissaries) also attend but do not vote (unless they happen to hold a vote as an elected representative suffragan) at meetings of the House.

The four "provincial episcopal visitors" (the Bishops suffragan of Richborough, of Ebbsfleet, of Oswestry and of Beverley) may attend and speak, but are not members and may not vote — unless they are elected as representative suffragans (as Beverley is).

Since 1 December 2016 six female bishops suffragan are "[given] rights of attendance". They are:

1. Alison White, Bishop suffragan of Hull
2. Ruth Worsley, Bishop suffragan of Wigan
3. Karen Gorham, Bishop suffragan of Sherborne
4. one vacancy vice Hartley
5. one vacancy vice Bailey Wells
6. one vacancy vice Hollinghurst

== Scheduled Crown Nominations Committee (CNC) meetings ==
The following meetings of the Crown Nominations Commission have been held since 2020, with the outcomes listed:

See	First meeting	Second meeting	Announcement	Election confirmed
Chester	3 February 2020	16 & 17 March 2020	12 May 2020	15 July 2020
Chelmsford	12 October 2020	18 & 19 November 2020	17 December 2020	11 March 2021
Portsmouth	21 June 2021	20 & 21 July 2021	8 October 2021	18 January 2022
Salisbury	29 September 2021	9 & 10 November 2021	13 January 2022	1 April 2022
Rochester	14 December 2021	27 & 28 January 2022	31 March 2022	24 May 2022
Bath and Wells	31 January 2022	28 & 1 March 2022	28 April 2022	29 June 2022
Liverpool	16 May 2022	21 & 22 June 2022	18 October 2022	20 January 2023
Newcastle	7 June 2022	18 & 19 July 2022	20 October 2022	3 February 2023
Blackburn	21 September 2022	8 & 9 November 2022	10 January 2023	25 April 2023
Lincoln	24 February 2023	28 & 29 March 2023	24 May 2023	20 July 2023
Winchester	21 March 2023	27 & 28 April 2023	6 July 2023	10 October 2023
Birmingham	21 April 2023	18 & 19 May 2023	31 August 2023	22 November 2023
Peterborough	13 June 2023	19 & 20 July 2023	28 September 2023	13 December 2023
Carlisle	7 November 2023	13 & 14 December 2023	15 December 2023: not filled	—
Sodor and Man	17 January 2024	13 & 14 March 2024	16 May 2024	n/a
Exeter	29 February 2024	9 & 10 April 2024	4 June 2024	25 September 2024
Ely	13 May 2024	11 & 12 July 2024	15 July 2024: not filled	—
Coventry	26 June 2024	11 & 12 September 2024	4 November 2024	14 February 2025
Truro	6 September 2024	15 & 16 October 2024	11 December 2024	28 March 2025
Durham	11 October 2024	26 & 27 November 2024	17 February 2025 (nominated candidate withdrew)	—
Carlisle	22 January 2025	13 & 14 March 2025	9 May 2025	1 September 2025
St Edmundsbury and Ipswich	4 March 2025	28 & 29 April 2025	27 June 2025	5 September 2025
Worcester	9 May 2025	12 & 13 June 2025	29 July 2025	28 November 2025
Canterbury	May & July 2025	September 2025	3 October 2025	28 January 2026
Ely	2 October 2025	12 & 13 November 2025	27 January 2026	17 April 2026
Durham	3 September 2025	9 & 10 December 2025	19 February 2026	29 April 2026
St Albans	4 December 2025	20 & 21 January 2026	19 March 2026	9 June 2026

Upcoming elections are listed below.

See	First meeting	Second meeting	Announcement	Election confirmed
Bristol	19 February 2026	15 & 16 April 2026	27 May 2026 (nominated candidate withdrew)	—
Leeds	4 March 2026	13 & 14 May 2026	31 July 2026	6 November 2026
See	First meeting	Second meeting	Estimated announcement	Election Confirmed
London	23 September 2026	12 & 13 November 2026	c. 2027	TBA
Bristol	22 September 2026	19 & 20 November 2026		TBA
Oxford	9 October 2026	9 & 10 December 2026	c. 2027	TBA
Liverpool	1 December 2026	27 & 28 January 2027	c. 2027	TBA
Southwark	4 February 2027	17 & 18 March 2027		TBA
Chichester	11 March 2027	20 & 21 April 2027		TBA
Lichfield	12 May 2027	30 June & 1 July 2027		TBA
Guildford	9 June 2027	20 & 21 July 2027		TBA
Manchester	9 September 2027	19 & 20 October 2027		TBA

== See also ==
- List of deans in the Church of England
- List of archdeacons in the Church of England
- List of Anglican diocesan bishops in Britain and Ireland
- List of Church of England dioceses
- List of current members of the House of Lords
- Religion in the United Kingdom
