= George Howe (priest) =

George Alexander Howe (born 1952) is a retired Anglican priest. He was Archdeacon of Westmorland and Furness from 2000 until 2011.

Howe was educated at Liverpool Institute, Durham University and Westcott House, Cambridge.

Howe was ordained in 1976. After curacies in Peterlee and Stockton-On-Tees he held incumbencies at Hart, Sedgefield, and Kendal before his time as Archdeacon; and Chief of Staff, Chaplain to the James Newcome (the Bishop of Carlisle) and Diocesan Director of Ordinands afterwards.

== Notes ==
Church of England titles
Preceded by David Jenkins	Archdeacon of Westmorland and Furness; 2000–2011	Succeeded by Penny Driver
