= Archdeacon of West Cumberland =

Church of England ecclesiastical office

The Archdeacon of West Cumberland is responsible for the archdeaconry of West Cumberland, one of three administrative divisions of the Church of England (Anglican) Diocese of Carlisle. The archdeaconry was created (mostly from the Archdeaconry of Westmorland but with a little territory from Furness and Carlisle archdeaconries) by Order-in-Council on 7 August 1959.

== List of archdeacons ==
The archdeaconry was erected in 1959; Pugh was the first archdeacon.

- 1959–1970 (res.): Edward Pugh (became Bishop suffragan of Penrith)
- 1970 – 31 March 1979 (res.): Bill Hardie, Vicar of Haile
- 1979 – 31 March 1991 (ret.): Burnham Hodgson (afterwards archdeacon emeritus)
- September 1991 – November 1996 (res.): John Packer, Priest-in-charge of Bridekirk from 1995 (became Bishop suffragan of Warrington)
- 1996–2004 (ret.): Alan Davis
- 2004–2008 (ret.): Colin Hill
- 20 January 2009 – 2022: Richard Pratt (alone)
- 24 January 2022 – present: Stewart Fyfe was collated Archdeacon of West Cumberland and Richard Pratt licensed as Associate Archdeacon in a job-share arrangement. Pratt was then collated Archdeacon of Carlisle in 2023.
