= Thompson Phillips =

Anglican clergyman (1832–1909)

Thompson Phillips (1832 – 1909) was Archdeacon of Furness from 1892 until 1901.

Born at Convamore, County Cork, Ireland, he was educated at Manchester Grammar School, Trinity College, Dublin and St John's College, Cambridge, and ordained priest in 1857. After curacies in Paddington and Coventry he held incumbencies at Holme Eden, Ivegill and Barrow-in-Furness.

He married Eliza, daughter of General James Wallace Sleigh. Their eldest son was James Robert Phillips.

For twelve years he employed Elizabeth Everest as a nanny to his daughter, Ella; in 1894, after Mrs Everest was dismissed as nanny to Winston and Jack Churchill, Rev. Phillips took her into his home for about a year, until she found her final home with her sister.

== Notes ==
Church of England titles
Preceded by Arthur Crosse	Archdeacon of Furness; 1892 – 1901	Succeeded by Cecil Boutflower
