= Order of precedence in England and Wales =

Relative preeminence of officials for ceremonial purposes

The following is the order of precedence in England and Wales as of September 2026. Separate orders exist for men and women.

Names in italics indicate that these people rank elsewhere—either higher in that table of precedence or in the table for the other sex. Titles in italics indicate the same thing for their holders, or that they are vacant.

Peers and their families make up a large part of these tables. It is possible for a peer to hold more than one title of nobility, and these may belong to different ranks and peerages. A peer derives his precedence from his highest-ranking title; peeresses derive their precedence in the same way, whether they hold their highest-ranking title in their own right or by marriage. The ranks in the tables refer to peers rather than titles: if exceptions are named for a rank, these do not include peers of a higher rank (or any peers at all, in the case of baronets). No exceptions are named for most categories, owing to their large size.

== Gentlemen ==
=== Royalty, archbishops, et al. ===
==== Royal family ====
Precedence is accorded to spouses, children and grandchildren of the reigning sovereign, as well as children and grandchildren of former sovereigns.

Position	Holder	Ref
The sovereign (regardless of sex)	Charles III	
Sons of the sovereign	William, Prince of Wales	
Sons of the sovereign	Prince Harry, Duke of Sussex	
Grandsons of the sovereign	Prince George of Wales	(Note: Ordered according to the rules of primogeniture.) (Note: "From [1726] onwards it has been the settled practice to place the male members of the Royal Family in the following order: the Sovereign's son, grandsons, brothers, uncles and nephews".)
Grandsons of the sovereign	Prince Louis of Wales	(Note: Ordered according to the rules of primogeniture.) (Note: "From [1726] onwards it has been the settled practice to place the male members of the Royal Family in the following order: the Sovereign's son, grandsons, brothers, uncles and nephews".)
Grandsons of the sovereign	Prince Archie of Sussex	(Note: Ordered according to the rules of primogeniture.) (Note: "From [1726] onwards it has been the settled practice to place the male members of the Royal Family in the following order: the Sovereign's son, grandsons, brothers, uncles and nephews".)
Brothers of the sovereign	Andrew Mountbatten-Windsor	
Brothers of the sovereign	Prince Edward, Duke of Edinburgh	
Uncles of the sovereign	None at present	
Nephews of the sovereign	James, Earl of Wessex (Note: Legally HRH Prince James of Edinburgh according to the 1917 Letters Patent as a male-line grandchild of a monarch, but styled as the duke's son per his parents' wishes on their wedding day and the will of Queen Elizabeth II.)	
Nephews of the sovereign	Peter Phillips	
Grandsons of former sovereigns who are dukes	Prince Richard, Duke of Gloucester	(Note: "in the outcome [in 1850] The Duke of Cambridge was not only placed in Garter's Roll above all the other dukes, but also above the Archbishop of Canterbury and the Lord Chancellor, despite his not falling within the ambit of s. 4 of the Act of 1539. This precedent has been followed in all subsequent similar cases.")
Grandsons of former sovereigns who are dukes	Prince Edward, Duke of Kent	(Note: "in the outcome [in 1850] The Duke of Cambridge was not only placed in Garter's Roll above all the other dukes, but also above the Archbishop of Canterbury and the Lord Chancellor, despite his not falling within the ambit of s. 4 of the Act of 1539. This precedent has been followed in all subsequent similar cases.")
Grandsons of former sovereigns who are not dukes	David Armstrong-Jones, 2nd Earl of Snowdon	
Grandsons of former sovereigns who are not dukes	Prince Michael of Kent	

==== Archbishops, High Officers of State, et al. ====
Title	Holder		Ref
Archbishop of Canterbury	Dame Sarah Mullally	Office held by a woman	
Lord High Steward	None; ceremonial and only appointed for coronations		(Note: Sir Gordon Messenger was the recent Lord High Steward in the 2023 Coronation.)
Lord High Chancellor of Great Britain	Alex Norris		
Archbishop of York	Stephen Cottrell		
Prime Minister	Andy Burnham		(Note: The title of Prime Minister was used unofficially in the 18th and 19th centuries for the First Lord of the Treasury; it first received official recognition with a royal warrant of 2 December 1905, which assigned the Prime Minister precedence immediately after that of the Archbishop of York.)
Lord High Treasurer	None; vacant since 1714		(Note: Charles Talbot, 1st Duke of Shrewsbury was the last person to hold the office of Lord High Treasurer until his resignation in 1714. Lords Commissioners of the Treasury do not exercise the office of Lord High Treasurer.)
Lord President of the Council	Sir Alan Campbell		
Speaker of the House of Commons	Sir Lindsay Hoyle		
Lord Speaker	Michael Forsyth, Baron Forsyth of Drumlean		(Note: The speakership of the House of Lords was historically vested in the Lord Chancellor; following the creation of a separate office of Lord Speaker, its rank and precedence was established by a royal warrant dated 4 July 2006 as being immediately after that of the Speaker of the House of Commons.)
President of the Supreme Court	Robert Reed, Baron Reed of Allermuir		
Lord Chief Justice of England and Wales	Sue Carr, Baroness Carr of Walton-on-the-Hill	Office held by a woman	
Lord Keeper of the Privy Seal	Angela Smith, Baroness Smith of Basildon	Office held by a woman	
The Ambassadors and High Commissioners to the United Kingdom in order of arrival			(Note: When visiting the United Kingdom, cabinet ministers of foreign countries are given precedence immediately above that of their country's High Commissioner (if in the Commonwealth) or Ambassador (if not).)
Lord Great Chamberlain	Rupert Carington, 7th Baron Carrington		
Lord High Constable	None; ceremonial and only appointed for coronations		(Note: Sir Tony Radakin was the recent Lord High Constable in the 2023 Coronation.)
Earl Marshal	Edward Fitzalan-Howard, 18th Duke of Norfolk		
Lord High Admiral	Charles III		(Note: Ranks higher as the Sovereign)
Lord Steward of the Household	Peter St Clair-Erskine, 7th Earl of Rosslyn		
Lord Chamberlain of the Household	Richard Benyon, Baron Benyon		
Master of the Horse	Henry Ashton, 4th Baron Ashton of Hyde		(Note: If the Master of the Horse holds a rank lower than a duke in the peerage, then by royal warrant dated 6 May 1907, he ranks next after the Lord Chamberlain.)

=== Nobility, bishops, et al. ===
==== Dukes, et al. ====
	Note	Ref
Royal dukes not grandsons of former sovereigns	None at present	
(Kingdom of England) England	Ordered according to date of creation	(Note: Excepting Edward Fitzalan-Howard, 18th Duke of Norfolk who ranks higher as the Earl Marshal.)
(Kingdom of Scotland) Scotland	Ordered according to date of creation	
(Kingdom of Great Britain) Great Britain	Ordered according to date of creation	
(Kingdom of Ireland) Ireland	Maurice FitzGerald, 9th Duke of Leinster	
United Kingdom	Ordered according to date of creation	(Note: The Dukedom of Abercorn was created after the Acts of Union 1800. It takes precedence after earlier Dukedoms of the United Kingdom.)
Eldest sons of royal dukes who are not already ranked higher	Alexander Windsor, Earl of Ulster (son of the Duke of Gloucester)	
Eldest sons of royal dukes who are not already ranked higher	George Windsor, Earl of St Andrews (son of the Duke of Kent)	
Ministers, envoys, and other very important visitors from foreign countries

==== Marquesses, et al. ====
	Note	Ref
(Kingdom of England) England	Christopher Paulet, 19th Marquess of Winchester	
(Kingdom of Scotland) Scotland	Ordered according to date of creation	
(Kingdom of Great Britain) Great Britain	Ordered according to date of creation	
(Kingdom of Ireland) Ireland	Ordered according to date of creation	
United Kingdom	Ordered according to date of creation	(Note: The Marquess of Londonderry (Earl Vane and Viscount Seaham in the Peerage of the United Kingdom, Baron Stewart in the Peerage of the United Kingdom and Marquess Conyngham (Baron Minster in the Peerage of the United Kingdom) was created after the Acts of Union 1800. They take precedence after earlier Marquessates of the United Kingdom.)
Eldest sons of dukes according to the precedence of the peerage holders

==== Earls, et al. ====
	Note	Ref
(Kingdom of England) England	Ordered according to date of creation	
(Kingdom of Scotland) Scotland	Ordered according to the Decreet of Ranking of 1606 according to date of creation	
(Kingdom of Great Britain) Great Britain	Ordered according to date of creation	
(Kingdom of Ireland) Ireland	Ordered according to date of creation	
United Kingdom	Ordered according to date of creation	(Note: Excepting The Earl of Snowdon, who rank higher as a member of the royal family.)
United Kingdom	Ordered according to date of creation	(Note: Excepting The Earl of Rosslyn, who rank higher as Lord Steward of the Household.)
United Kingdom	Ordered according to date of creation	(Note: The Earl of Limerick (The Baron Foxford in the Peerage of the United Kingdom), The Earl of Clancarty (The Viscount Clancarty in the Peerage of the United Kingdom, The Baron Trench in the Peerage of the United Kingdom), The Earl of Rosse, The Earl of Gosford (The Baron Worlington in the Peerage of the United Kingdom, The Baron Acheson in the Peerage of the United Kingdom), The Earl of Normanton (The Baron Mendip in the Peerage of Great Britain, The Baron Somerton in the Peerage of the United Kingdom), The Earl of Kilmorey, The Earl of Listowel (The Baron Hare in the Peerage of the United Kingdom), The Earl of Norbury and The Earl of Ranfurly (The Baron Ranfurly in the Peerage of the United Kingdom) was created after the Acts of Union 1800. It takes precedence after earlier Earldoms of the United Kingdom.)
Younger sons of royal dukes who are not already ranked higher	Lord Nicholas Windsor (second son of the Duke of Kent)	
Eldest sons of marquesses according to the precedence of the peerage holders
Eldest sons of eldest sons of dukes according to the precedence of the peerage holders
Younger sons of dukes according to the precedence of the peerage holders
Younger sons of eldest sons of dukes according to the precedence of the peerage holders

==== Viscounts, et al. ====
	Note	Ref
(Kingdom of England) England	Robin Devereux, 19th Viscount Hereford	
(Kingdom of Scotland) Scotland	Ordered according to date of creation	
(Kingdom of Great Britain) Great Britain	Ordered according to date of creation	
(Kingdom of Ireland) Ireland	Ordered according to date of creation	
United Kingdom	Ordered according to date of creation	(Note: Viscount Monck (The Baron Monck in the Peerage of the United Kingdom) and Viscount Gort was created after the Acts of Union 1800. It takes precedence after earlier Viscountcies of the United Kingdom.)
Eldest sons of earls according to the precedence of the peerage holders		
Lord Frederick Windsor (only son of Prince Michael of Kent)		
Eldest sons of eldest sons of marquesses ordered according to the precedence of the peerage holders
Younger sons of marquesses ordered according to the precedence of the peerage holders
Younger sons of eldest sons of marquesses ordered according to the precedence of the peerage holders

==== Bishops ====
	Title	Holder	Ref
Diocesan bishops with seats in the House of Lords – ex officio	Bishop of London	None; vacant since 2026	(Note: Excepting the Archbishops of Canterbury and York who rank higher as the Primate of All England and the Primate of England respectively.)
Diocesan bishops with seats in the House of Lords – ex officio	Bishop of Durham	Rick Simpson	(Note: Excepting the Archbishops of Canterbury and York who rank higher as the Primate of All England and the Primate of England respectively.)
Diocesan bishops with seats in the House of Lords – ex officio	Bishop of Winchester	Philip Mounstephen	(Note: Excepting the Archbishops of Canterbury and York who rank higher as the Primate of All England and the Primate of England respectively.)
Other diocesan bishops with seats in the House of Lords ordered according to seniority of confirmation of election			(Note: The number of bishops entitled to sit in the House of Lords has been fixed at 21 since the 16th century; they were all male until 2015, when women who are bishops began to be introduced to the House of Lords under the terms of the Lords Spiritual (Women) Act 2015.)
Other diocesan bishops ordered according to seniority of confirmation of election
Suffragan bishops ordered according to seniority of consecration
Retired Church of England diocesan archbishops and bishops ordered according to original date of confirmation of election

==== Barons/Lords of Parliament ====
	Order of precedence	Notes
Secretaries of State; Being of the degree of a baron		
(Kingdom of England) England	Ordered according to date of creation	
(Kingdom of Scotland) Scotland	Ordered according to date of creation	
(Kingdom of Great Britain) Great Britain	Ordered according to date of creation	(Note: Excepting The Lord Carrington, who ranks higher as Lord Great Chamberlain.)
(Kingdom of Ireland) Ireland	Ordered according to date of creation	
United Kingdom	Ordered according to date of creation	(Note: Barons and baronesses for life created under the Appellate Jurisdiction Act 1876 and the Life Peerages Act 1958.)
United Kingdom	Ordered according to date of creation	(Note: Excepting The Lord Forsyth of Drumlean, who ranks higher as Lord Speaker of the House of Lords.)
United Kingdom	Ordered according to date of creation	(Note: Excepting The Lord Reed of Allermuir, who ranks higher as the President of the Supreme Court.)
United Kingdom	Ordered according to date of creation	(Note: Excepting The Lord Benyon who ranks higher as the Lord Chamberlain of the Household.)
United Kingdom	Ordered according to date of creation	(Note: Excepting The Lord Ashton of Hyde who ranks higher as the Master of the Horse.)
United Kingdom	Ordered according to date of creation	(Note: The Baron Rendlesham, The Baron Castlemaine, The Baron Decies, The Baron Garvagh, The Baron Talbot of Malahide, The Baron Carew (The Baron Carew in the Peerage of the United Kingdom), The Baron Oranmore and Browne (The Baron Mereworth in the Peerage of the United Kingdom), The Baron Bellew, The Baron Fermoy and The Baron Rathdonnell was created after the Acts of Union 1800. They take precedence after earlier Barons of the United Kingdom.)

=== Gentry, et al. ===
==== Master of the Rolls and Supreme Court Justices ====
Title	Holder		Ref
Master of the Rolls	Sir Geoffrey Vos		
Deputy President of the Supreme Court	Philip Sales, Lord Sales		
Justices of the Supreme Court	David Lloyd Jones, Lord Lloyd-Jones		(Note: Justices of the Supreme Court who are not peers have the right to the courtesy title of "Lord" or "Lady" for life by authority of royal warrant issued 10 December 2010.)
Justices of the Supreme Court	Michael Briggs, Lord Briggs of Westbourne		(Note: Justices of the Supreme Court who are not peers have the right to the courtesy title of "Lord" or "Lady" for life by authority of royal warrant issued 10 December 2010.)
Justices of the Supreme Court	Nicholas Hamblen, Lord Hamblen of Kersey		(Note: Justices of the Supreme Court who are not peers have the right to the courtesy title of "Lord" or "Lady" for life by authority of royal warrant issued 10 December 2010.)
Justices of the Supreme Court	George Leggatt, Lord Leggatt		(Note: Justices of the Supreme Court who are not peers have the right to the courtesy title of "Lord" or "Lady" for life by authority of royal warrant issued 10 December 2010.)
Justices of the Supreme Court	Andrew Burrows, Lord Burrows		(Note: Justices of the Supreme Court who are not peers have the right to the courtesy title of "Lord" or "Lady" for life by authority of royal warrant issued 10 December 2010.)
Justices of the Supreme Court	Ben Stephens, Lord Stephens of Creevyloughgare		(Note: Justices of the Supreme Court who are not peers have the right to the courtesy title of "Lord" or "Lady" for life by authority of royal warrant issued 10 December 2010.)
Justices of the Supreme Court	Vivien Rose, Lady Rose of Colmworth	Office held by a woman	(Note: Justices of the Supreme Court who are not peers have the right to the courtesy title of "Lord" or "Lady" for life by authority of royal warrant issued 10 December 2010.)
Justices of the Supreme Court	Ingrid Simler, Lady Simler	Office held by a woman	(Note: Justices of the Supreme Court who are not peers have the right to the courtesy title of "Lord" or "Lady" for life by authority of royal warrant issued 10 December 2010.)
Justices of the Supreme Court	Raymond Doherty, Lord Doherty		(Note: Justices of the Supreme Court who are not peers have the right to the courtesy title of "Lord" or "Lady" for life by authority of royal warrant issued 10 December 2010.)
Justices of the Supreme Court	Richard Snowden, Lord Snowden of Redcar		(Note: Justices of the Supreme Court who are not peers have the right to the courtesy title of "Lord" or "Lady" for life by authority of royal warrant issued 10 December 2010.)

==== Royal Household officials ====
Title	Holder		Ref
Lords Commissioners of the Great Seal	None; last appointed in 1850		
Treasurer of the Household		Sir Mark Tami	
Comptroller of the Household	Gen Kitchen	Office held by a woman	
Vice-Chamberlain of the Household	Emma Foody	Office held by a woman	

==== Cabinet, et al. ====
Title
Secretaries of State
Under the degree of a Baron
Eldest sons of viscounts according to the precedence of the peerage holders
Eldest sons of eldest sons of earls according to the precedence of the peerage holders
Younger sons of earls according to the precedence of the peerage holders
Younger sons of eldest sons of earls according to the precedence of the peerage holders
Eldest sons of barons according to the precedence of the peerage holders

The Prime Minister determines the order of precedence for Secretaries of State as part of the ministerial ranking (also known as the order of precedence in Cabinet).

==== Knights Companion of the Order of the Garter and Knights of the Order of the Thistle ====
Order	Post-nominal letters	Holder	Ref
Knights Companion of the Order of the Garter	KG	Sir John Major	(Note: Who are not already ranked higher in precedence as peers or royalty.)
Knights Companion of the Order of the Garter	KG	Sir Tony Blair	(Note: Who are not already ranked higher in precedence as peers or royalty.)
Knights of the Order of the Thistle	KT	Sir Jim McDonald	(Note: Who are not already ranked higher in precedence as peers or royalty.)
Knights of the Order of the Thistle	KT	Sir James MacMillan	(Note: Who are not already ranked higher in precedence as peers or royalty.)
Knights of the Order of St Patrick	KP	None; order dormant	(Note: The last Knight, Prince Henry, Duke of Gloucester, died in 1974.)

==== Privy Counsellors, et al. ====
Privy Counsellors	Holder		Ref
Privy Counsellors (PC)	Ordered according to date of oath-taking		(Note: Privy Counsellors who do not already rank higher are mostly current or former politicians, civil servants, royal household staff, clergy and judiciary.)
Chancellor of the Order of the Garter	Eliza Manningham-Buller, Baroness Manningham-Buller	Office held by a woman	
Chancellor of the Exchequer	John Healey		(Note: Ranks higher as a Privy Counsellor.)
Chancellor of the Duchy of Lancaster	Louise Haigh	Office held by a woman	

==== Senior judges, et al. ====
		Holder		Ref
The Senior Judges	President of the King's Bench Division	Dame Victoria Sharp	Office held by a woman	(Note: This office was historically held jointly with that of Lord Chief Justice; following their separation, a royal warrant dated 30 September 2005 declared that "the rank and precedence of the President of the Queen's Bench Division shall be so placed as to be in order immediately before the President of the Family Division".)
The Senior Judges	President of the Family Division	Sir Stephen Cobb		
The Senior Judges	Chancellor of the High Court	Sir Colin Birss		
Lord Justices of Appeal		Ordered according to seniority of appointment		(Note: Lord and Lady Justices of Appeal are customarily made Privy Counsellors, and thus rank accordingly.)
Judges of the High Court		Ordered according to seniority of appointment		
Eldest sons of eldest sons of viscounts according to the precedence of the peerage holders
Younger sons of viscounts according to the precedence of the peerage holders
Younger sons of eldest sons of viscounts according to the precedence of the peerage holders
Eldest sons of eldest sons of barons according to the precedence of the peerage holders
Younger sons of barons according to the precedence of the peerage holders
Younger sons of eldest sons of barons according to the precedence of the peerage holders
All sons of life peers according to the precedence of the peerage holders				(Note: Rank and precedence set by royal warrant, dated 21 July 1958.)

==== Baronets ====
	Post-nominal letters	Ref
Baronets	Bt	(Note: Baronetcies belong to any of five baronetages, namely the Baronetages of England (1611–1705), Nova Scotia (1625–1706), Ireland (1620–1799), Great Britain (1707–1800) and the United Kingdom (1801–present); this does not affect their precedence in relation to each other.)

==== Knights ====
Level	Order	Post-nominal letters	Ref
Knights Grand Cross	Knights Grand Cross of the Order of the Bath	GCB	
Knights Grand Cross	Knights Grand Commander of the Order of the Star of India	GCSI	(Note: The last Knight Grand Commander, Chithira Thirunal Balarama Varma, Maharaja of Travancore, died in 1991.)
Knights Grand Cross	Knights Grand Cross of the Order of St Michael and St George	GCMG	
Knights Grand Cross	Knights Grand Commander of the Order of the Indian Empire	GCIE	
Knights Grand Cross	Knights Grand Cross of the Royal Victorian Order	GCVO	
Knights Grand Cross	Knights Grand Cross of the Order of the British Empire	GBE	
Knights Commander	Knights Commander of the Order of the Bath	KCB	
Knights Commander	Knights Commander of the Order of the Star of India	KCSI	(Note: The last Knight Commander, Tej Singh Prabhakar, Maharaja of Alwar, died in 2009.)
Knights Commander	Knights Commander of the Order of St Michael and St George	KCMG	
Knights Commander	Knights Commander of the Order of the Indian Empire	KCIE	(Note: The last Knight Commander, Meghrajji III, Maharaja of Dhrangadhra-Halvad, died in 2010.)
Knights Commander	Knights Commander of the Royal Victorian Order	KCVO	
Knights Commander	Knights Commander of the Order of the British Empire	KBE	
Knights Bachelor		(None)	

==== Lower level judges, et al. ====
Title	Holder	Ref
Vice-Chancellor of the County Palatine of Lancaster	Sir Thomas Leech	(Note: He ranks higher as a High Court judge; it is customary for a High Court judge to be named to this position.)
Recorder of London	Mark Lucraft	
Recorders of Liverpool and Manchester		(Note: In order of appointment.)
Recorder of Liverpool	Andrew Menary	
Recorder of Manchester	Nicholas Dean	
Common Serjeant of London	Richard Marks	
Circuit Judges		

=== Other lower ranks, including esquires and gentlemen ===
==== Companions, commanders, lieutenants and officers of various orders ====
Order	Post-nominal letters	Ref
Companions of the Order of the Bath	CB	
Companions of the Order of the Star of India	CSI	(Note: The last Companion, Ronald Brockman, died in 1999.)
Companions of the Order of St Michael and St George	CMG	
Companions of the Order of the Indian Empire	CIE	(Note: The last Companion, Ian Dixon Scott, died in 2002.)
Commanders of the Royal Victorian Order	CVO	
Commanders of the Order of the British Empire	CBE	
Companions of the Distinguished Service Order	DSO	
Lieutenants of the Royal Victorian Order	LVO	
Officers of the Order of the British Empire	OBE	
Companions of the Imperial Service Order	ISO	

==== Sons and members ====
Order	Note	Ref
Eldest sons of younger sons of hereditary peers in their own right	Ordered according to the precedence of the peerage holders	
Eldest sons of baronets	Ordered according to the precedence of the baronets	
Eldest sons of knights	Ordered according to the precedence of the knights	
Members of the Royal Victorian Order (MVO)	MVO post-nominal	
Members of the Order of the British Empire (MBE)	MBE post-nominal	
Younger sons of baronets	Ordered according to the precedence of the baronets	
Younger sons of knights	Ordered according to the precedence of the knights	

== Ladies ==
=== Royal Family ===
The order of precedence accorded to women of the royal family:

Position	Holder
Consort of the sovereign	Queen Camilla
Daughters-in-law of the sovereign	Catherine, Princess of Wales
Daughters-in-law of the sovereign	Meghan, Duchess of Sussex
Daughters of the sovereign	None at present
Wives of grandsons of the sovereign	None at present
Granddaughters of the sovereign	Princess Charlotte of Wales
Granddaughters of the sovereign	Princess Lilibet of Sussex
Sisters-in-law of the sovereign	Sophie, Duchess of Edinburgh
Sisters of the sovereign	Anne, Princess Royal
Wives of uncles of the sovereign	None at present
Aunts of the sovereign	None at present
Wives of nephews of the sovereign	Harriet Phillips
Nieces of the sovereign	Princess Beatrice, Mrs Edoardo Mapelli Mozzi
Nieces of the sovereign	Princess Eugenie, Mrs Jack Brooksbank
Nieces of the sovereign	Lady Louise Mountbatten-Windsor (Note: Legally HRH Princess Louise of Edinburgh according to the 1917 Letters Patent as a male-line grandchild of a monarch, but styled as the duke's daughter per her parents' wishes on their wedding day and the will of Queen Elizabeth II.)
Nieces of the sovereign	Zara Tindall
Wives of grandsons of former sovereigns who are dukes	Birgitte, Duchess of Gloucester
Wives of grandsons of former sovereigns who are not dukes	Serena Armstrong-Jones, Countess of Snowdon
Wives of grandsons of former sovereigns who are not dukes	Princess Michael of Kent
Granddaughters of former sovereigns	Lady Sarah Chatto
Granddaughters of former sovereigns	Princess Alexandra, The Honourable Lady Ogilvy

=== High Officers of State, et al. ===
Title	Holder	Ref
Archbishop of Canterbury	Dame Sarah Mullally	
Lady Chief Justice of England and Wales	Sue Carr, Baroness Carr of Walton-on-the-Hill	
Lord Keeper of the Privy Seal	Angela Smith, Baroness Smith of Basildon	
The Ambassadors and High Commissioners to the United Kingdom in order of arrival		

=== Nobility and bishops ===
==== Duchesses, et al. ====
	Note	Ref
(Kingdom of England) England	Ordered according to date of creation	
(Kingdom of Scotland) Scotland	Ordered according to date of creation	
(Kingdom of Great Britain) Great Britain	Ordered according to date of creation	
(Kingdom of Ireland) Ireland	Fiona FitzGerald, Duchess of Leinster	
United Kingdom	Ordered according to date of creation	
Wives of eldest sons of royal dukes	Claire Windsor, Countess of Ulster (wife of Earl of Ulster)	
Wives of eldest sons of royal dukes	Sylvana Windsor, Countess of St Andrews (wife of Earl of St Andrews)	
Daughters of royal dukes	Lady Davina Windsor (elder daughter of the Duke of Gloucester)	
Daughters of royal dukes	Lady Rose Gilman (younger daughter of the Duke of Gloucester)	
Daughters of royal dukes	Lady Helen Taylor (only daughter of the Duke of Kent)	
Ministers, envoys, and other very important visitors from foreign countries

==== Marchionesses, et al. ====
	Note	Ref
(Kingdom of England) England	Christine Paulet, Marchioness of Winchester	
(Kingdom of Scotland) Scotland	Ordered according to date of creation	
(Kingdom of Great Britain) Great Britain	Ordered according to date of creation	
(Kingdom of Ireland) Ireland	Ordered according to date of creation	
United Kingdom	Ordered according to date of creation	
Wives of the eldest sons of dukes according to the precedence of the peerage holders
Daughters of dukes not married to peers

==== Countesses, et al. ====
	Note	Ref
(Kingdom of England) England	Ordered according to date of creation	
(Kingdom of Scotland) Scotland	Ordered according to the Decreet of Ranking of 1606 according to date of creation	
(Kingdom of Great Britain) Great Britain	Ordered according to date of creation	
(Kingdom of Ireland) Ireland	Ordered according to date of creation	
United Kingdom	Ordered according to date of creation	
Wives of younger sons of royal dukes who are not already ranked higher	Lady Nicholas Windsor (wife of Lord Nicholas Windsor)	
Wives of eldest sons of marquesses according to the precedence of the peerage holders
Daughters of Princes who are not Royal Dukes	Lady Gabriella Kingston (only daughter of Prince Michael of Kent)	
Daughters of marquesses not married to peers
Wives of younger sons of dukes according to the precedence of the peerage holders

==== Viscountesses, et al. ====
	Note	Ref
(Kingdom of England) England	Louisa Devereux, Viscountess Hereford	
(Kingdom of Scotland) Scotland	Ordered according to date of creation	
(Kingdom of Great Britain) Great Britain	Ordered according to date of creation	
(Kingdom of Ireland) Ireland	Ordered according to date of creation	
United Kingdom	Ordered according to date of creation	
Wives of eldest sons of earls according to the precedence of the peerage holders
Lady Frederick Windsor (wife of Lord Frederick Windsor)
Daughters of earls not married to peers
Wives of younger sons of marquesses ordered according to the precedence of the peerage holders

==== Female bishops ====
	Ref
Female diocesan bishops with seats in the House of Lords – ex officio	
Other female diocesan bishops with seats in the House of Lords ordered according to seniority of confirmation of election	
Other female diocesan bishops ordered according to seniority of confirmation of election	
Female suffragan bishops ordered according to seniority of consecration	
Retired female Church of England diocesan archbishops and bishops ordered according to original date of confirmation of election	

==== Baronesses ====
	Note	Ref
Secretaries of State; Being of the degree of a baroness	None at present	
(Kingdom of England) England	Ordered according to date of creation	
(Kingdom of Scotland) Scotland	Ordered according to date of creation	
(Kingdom of Great Britain) Great Britain	Ordered according to date of creation	
(Kingdom of Ireland) Ireland	Ordered according to date of creation	
United Kingdom	Ordered according to date of creation	(Note: Excepting The Baroness Carr of Walton-on-the-Hill who ranks higher as the Lady Chief Justice of England and Wales.) (Note: Excepting The Baroness Smith of Basildon who ranks higher as the Lord Keeper of the Privy Seal.)

=== Gentry, et al. ===
==== Supreme Court Justices ====
Title	Holder	Ref
Justices of the Supreme Court	Vivien Rose, Lady Rose of Colmworth	
Justices of the Supreme Court	Ingrid Simler, Lady Simler	

==== Female Royal Household officials ====
Title	Holder	Ref
Comptroller of the Household	Gen Kitchen	
Vice-Chamberlain of the Household	Emma Foody	

==== Cabinet, et al. ====
Title
Secretaries of State
Under the degree of a Baroness
Wives of Viscounts' eldest sons
Daughters of Viscounts not married to peers
Wives of younger sons of Earls
Wives of eldest sons of Barons
Daughters of Barons not married to peers

The Prime Minister determines the order of precedence for Secretaries of State as part of the ministerial ranking (also known as the order of precedence in Cabinet).

=== Ladies and dames, et al. ===
==== Ladies Companion of the Order of the Garter and Ladies of the Order of the Thistle ====
Order	Post-nominal letters	Holder	Ref
Ladies Companion of the Order of the Garter	LG	Lady Mary Fagan	
Ladies Companion of the Order of the Garter	LG	Lady Mary Peters	
Ladies of the Order of the Thistle	LT	Lady Elish Angiolini	

==== Wives of Knights Companion of the Order of the Garter ====
Wife	Husband who is/was member	Ref
Lady (June) Hilary	Sir Edmund Hillary	(Note: Widow of Sir Edmund Hillary who is a New Zealand Citizen may use this when visiting the United Kingdom.)
Lady (Jennifer) Acland	Sir Antony Acland	
Lady (Norma) Major	Sir John Major	(Note: Also titled Dame Norma Major, a Dame Commander of the Order of the British Empire in her own right but with lower precedence.)
Lady (Henrietta) Dunne	Sir Thomas Dunne	
Lady (Tessa) Brewer	Sir David Brewer	
Lady (Cherie) Blair	Sir Tony Blair	

==== Wives of Knights of the Order of the Thistle ====
Wife	Husband who is/was member	Ref
Lady (Poppy) Anderson	Sir Eric Anderson	
Lady (Gillian) Morrison	Sir Garth Morrison	(Note: Widow of Sir Garth Morrison.)
Lady (Helen) Wood	Sir Ian Wood	(Note: Widow of Sir Ian Wood.)
Lady (Daphne) Reid	Sir George Reid	
Lady (Margaret) Palmer	Sir Geoff Palmer	
Lady (Eileen) McDonald	Sir Jim McDonald	
Lady (Lynne) MacMillan	Sir James MacMillan	

==== Female Privy Counsellors, et al. ====
Privy Counsellors	Holder	Ref
Privy Counsellors (PC)	Ordered according to date of oath-taking	
Chancellor of the Order of the Garter	Eliza Manningham-Buller, Baroness Manningham-Buller	(Note: Ranks higher as a Baroness)
Chancellor of the Duchy of Lancaster	Louise Haigh	

==== Senior judges, et al. ====
	Holder	Ref
President of the King's Bench Division	Dame Victoria Sharp	
Lady Justices of Appeal	Ordered according to seniority of appointment	
Judges of the High Court	Ordered according to seniority of appointment	
Wives of younger sons of viscounts according to the precedence of the peerage holders
Wives of younger sons of barons according to the precedence of the peerage holders
Baronetesses in their own right	None at present	(Note: The most recent, Anne Maxwell Macdonald, died in 2011.)
Wives of baronets

==== Dames ====
Level	Order	Post-nominal letters	Ref
Dames Grand Cross	of the Order of the Bath	GCB	
Dames Grand Cross	of the Order of St Michael and St George	GCMG	
Dames Grand Cross	of the Royal Victorian Order	GCVO	
Dames Grand Cross	of the Order of the British Empire	GBE	
Wives	of Knights Grand Cross of the Order of the Bath		
Wives	of Knights Grand Commander of the Order of the Star of India		
Wives	of Knights Grand Cross of the Order of St Michael and St George		
Wives	of Knights Grand Commander of the Order of the Indian Empire		
Wives	of Knights Grand Cross of the Royal Victorian Order		
Wives	of Knights Grand Cross of the Order of the British Empire		
Dames Commander	of the Order of the Bath	DCB	
Dames Commander	of the Order of St Michael and St George	DCMG	
Dames Commander	of the Royal Victorian Order	DCVO	
Dames Commander	of the Order of the British Empire	DBE	(Note: Dame Norma Major DBE also has a higher precedence as the wife of Sir John Major KG.)
Wives of Knights Commander	of the Order of the Bath		
Wives of Knights Commander	of the Order of the Star of India		
Wives of Knights Commander	of the Order of St Michael and St George		
Wives of Knights Commander	of the Order of the Indian Empire		
Wives of Knights Commander	of the Royal Victorian Order		
Wives of Knights Commander	of the Order of the British Empire		
Wives of knights bachelor			

==== Lower level judges ====
Title	Holder	Ref
Circuit Judges		

=== Members of orders, et al. ===
- Members of the following orders:
  - Companions of the Order of the Bath
  - Companions of the Order of St Michael and St George
  - Commanders of the Royal Victorian Order
  - Commanders of the Order of the British Empire (Note: Cherie Blair CBE also has a higher precedence as the wife of Sir Tony Blair KG.)
- Wives of Companions of the following orders:
  - Order of the Bath
  - Order of the Star of India
  - Order of St Michael and St George
  - Order of the Indian Empire
  - Royal Victorian Order
  - Order of the British Empire
- Wives of Companions of the Distinguished Service Order
- Lieutenants of the Royal Victorian Order
- Officers of the Order of the British Empire
- Wives of Lieutenants of the Royal Victorian Order
- Wives of Officers of the Order of the British Empire
- Companions of the Imperial Service Order
- Wives of Companions of the Imperial Service Order

=== Wives and daughters of peers, baronets, and knights, et al. ===
- Wives of the eldest sons of sons of peers or peeresses
- Daughters of sons of peers or peeresses
- Wives of the eldest sons of baronets
- Daughters of baronets
- Wives of eldest sons of knights:
  - Knights Companion of the Order of the Garter
  - Knights of the Order of the Thistle
  - Knights of the Order of St Patrick
  - Knights Grand Cross or Grand Commander
  - Knights Commander
- Daughters of knights:
  - Daughters of Knights Companion of the Order of the Garter
  - Daughters of Knights of the Order of the Thistle
  - Daughters of Knights Grand Cross or Grand Commander
  - Daughters of Knights Commander
- Members of the Royal Victorian Order
- Members of the Order of the British Empire
- Wives of members of the Royal Victorian Order
- Wives of members of the Order of the British Empire

=== Wives of younger sons ===
- Wives of younger sons of baronets
- Wives of younger sons of knights:
  - Knights Companion of the Order of the Garter
  - Knights of the Order of the Thistle
  - Knights of the Order of St Patrick
  - Knights Grand Cross or Knights Grand Commander
  - Knights Commander
