= James Robert Phillips =

British colonial administrator (1863–1897)

Acting Consul General Phillips
- Born: James Robert Phillips; 11 September 1863; Ivegill, Cumberland, England
- Died: 4 January 1897 (aged 33); Ugbine, Benin Rivers
- Occupations: Deputy Commissioner and Consul General
- Years active: 1891–1897
- Known for: The Benin Massacre
- Notable work: Sheriff and Queen's Advocate of the Gold Coast (1891–1896)

James Robert Phillips (1863 – 4 January 1897) was the deputy commissioner and consul for the Niger Coast Protectorate. He is remembered for his part in the events that led to the Benin Expedition of 1897. In 1897, Phillips set out to petition the Oba of Benin, although his reasons for doing so remain unclear. He and his party were ambushed and slaughtered as they approached Benin City, with Phillips being among the casualties. Though Phillips had acted without consulting the Royal Niger Company authorities, after his death the British government dispatched a punitive expedition against the Benin monarchy, which the force defeated and deposed, leading to the kingdom's eventual absorption into colonial Nigeria.

== Life ==
James Phillips was the eldest son of Reverend Thompson Phillips, vicar of Ivegill and later Archdeacon of Furness in the Diocese of Carlisle, and Eliza, daughter of General James Wallace Sleigh.

== Education ==
Phillips was educated at Uppingham School, an independent boarding school. In 1882 he went up to Trinity College, Cambridge to read law. He served his solicitor's articles (trained as a solicitor) at Carlisle with the Clerk of the Peace for Cumberland and was in due course admitted a solicitor.

He played football for the Eden Wanderers Football Club for several seasons, proving himself a man of strong physique, vigour and resource. He was well liked by his teammates.

== Gold Coast ==
After qualifying as a solicitor, he believed that there might be better openings for him in the colonies. In 1891, he accepted an appointment as a colonial officer on the Gold Coast (present-day Ghana) as a Sheriff and Overseer of Prisons. In 1892 he was promoted to the position of Acting Queen's Advocate of the Gold Coast.

== Niger Coast Protectorate ==
In 1896, Phillips returned to England on leave and while visiting friends in Cumberland he expressed himself pleased with his prospects.

In May 1896, he was appointed deputy commissioner and consul for the Niger Coast Protectorate and adjoining native territories. He was ordered by the Foreign Office in London to wait in England until he could meet with the current Niger Coast Protectorate Commissioner and Consul-General, Ralph Denham Rayment Moor, who was en route to England to begin a period of leave. No record exists on where they met or what they discussed but they most probably met in London in September 1896.

As a lawyer, Phillips had a brief from the Foreign Office to concentrate on the prisons and legal system of the Protectorate. He arrived in the Protectorate on 24 October 1896. On 31 October 1896, he held a meeting with members of the Benin Rivers trading companies to introduce himself to the traders. This included European traders of the Royal Niger Company, Itsekiri chiefs and native traders. Additionally, he wanted to hear directly from them about trading issues they were having. During this meeting, he met Chief Dogho and other Itsekiri chiefs, as well as a number of European traders including representatives of the Royal Niger Company at Sapele on the Benin River.

After this meeting and his discussions with Moor, Phillips felt that he had ‘gained a very clear picture of the state of affairs’ in the Benin Rivers trading situation. On 16 November 1896 he wrote to the Foreign Office in London stating that:

“The King of Benin has continued to do everything in his power to stop the people from trading and prevent the Government from opening up the country. By means of his Fetish he has succeeded to a marked degree. He has permanently placed a Juju on (Palm) Kernels, the most profitable product of the country, and the penalty for trading in this produce is death. He has closed the markets and has only occasionally consented to open them in certain places on receipt of presents from the Jakri chiefs. Only however to close them again when he desires more blackmail…I feel so convinced that every means has been successfully tried that I have advised the Jakri chiefs to discontinue their presents.” “I therefore ask for his Lordship’s permission to visit Benin City in February next, to depose and remove the King of Benin and to establish a native council in his place and to take such further steps for the opening up of the country as the occasion may require. I do not anticipate any serious resistance from the people of the country – there is every reason to believe that they would be glad to get rid of their King – but in order to obviate any danger I wish to take up a sufficient armed Force, consisting of 250 troops, two seven-pounder guns, 1 Maxim gun, and 1 Rocket apparatus of the Niger Coast Protectorate Force (NCPF) and a detachment of Lagos Hausas 150 strong, if his Lordship and the Secretary of State for the Colonies will sanction the use of the Colonial Forces to this extent…PS I would add that I have reason to hope that sufficient Ivory may be found in the King’s house to pay the expenses in removing the King from his Stool.”

Phillips' letter was sent in a dispatch to London on 17 November 1896. Without waiting for a response from the Foreign Office, he began an expedition to Benin. Phillips with six other British officials, two businessmen, translators, and 215 porters, set off from the small port of Sapele. The total number of men who embarked on this expedition has been put at over 500 by some sources, based on references made by survivor Alan Maxwell Boisragon in his book The Benin Massacre (1897). The official number of participants in the expedition was put at 250 African carriers and nine white men.

== The Benin massacre ==
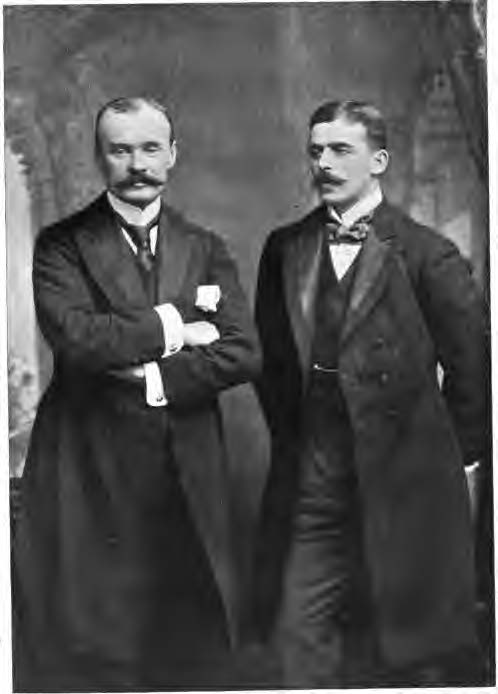
Boisragon and Locke, the two British men to survive the ambush

On 17 December 1896, Phillips set off from Old Calabar in the yacht Ivy on the expedition to Benin. He also sent a message through Chief Dogho (Itsekiri Chief) to Ovonramwen, the 36th Oba of Benin, that he was on his way to visit. Although they had given word of their intended visit, they were later informed that their arrival must be delayed, because no foreigner could enter the city while rituals were being conducted; however, the travellers continued on their expedition. His true intentions were not clear to Oba Ovonramwen, who replied asking him to wait for some days whilst he and his Council of Chiefs investigated claims that ‘the whitemen are bringing war to Benin’. He also informed Phillips that he was currently engaged in 'worshipping his father's head' in the Ague Festival. Phillips failed to heed the Oba's advice, as well as pleas from his Itsekiri advisors, and on 4 January 1897 he pressed ahead with his plan.

Phillips and his party were ambushed en route to Benin City by Benin warriors led by Ologbosere, and only two Europeans escaped the ensuing massacre. The circumstances of their deaths are unclear. Phillips and at least three other white men (Vice Consul Major Peter Wade Grant Copland-Crawford, of the 7th Battalion King's Royal Rifles, and vice-consul of the Benin and Warri District; Dr Robert Hannah Elliot, medical officer of Sapele and Benin District; and Captain Arthur Irwin Maling, lieutenant of the 16th Lancers) are believed to have been killed during the initial attack near Ugbine village on 4 January. Robert Home concluded that three other white men (Kenneth Chichester Campbell, a District Commissioner at Sapele; Harry Simes Powis of Miller, Brother and Company; and Thomas Gordon of the African Association) may have been taken to Benin City as hostages and died during the subsequent British attack in February. Only two white officers survived: Captain Alan Boisragon, Commandant of the Constabulary of the Niger Coast Protectorate; and Ralph Locke, District Commissioner of Warri. The fate of the African troops, carriers and other servants who were working for the party is largely unclear, with initial press reports stating that 250 were killed. Boisragon reported that a small number of carriers survived the attack and managed to reach the safety of a British steamer downriver.

The British Foreign Secretary Lord Salisbury responded to Phillips on 9 January 1897 advising him to postpone the planned expedition for another year as there were not currently enough troops to undertake the mission. Salisbury stated that 400 men would be required for this and as there were currently other expeditions in progress elsewhere in the protectorate, this number could not be raised. However Phillips was by this time already dead.

== Aftermath ==
The British Admiralty responded swiftly to the Benin Massacre by authorizing the punitive expedition which departed in February 1897. On 18 February, Benin City was captured by the expedition and the Kingdom of Benin was overthrown; it was eventually absorbed into colonial Nigeria.

The British government revoked the Royal Niger Company's charter (granted in 1886) as a result of these events and ongoing complaints against the company from the Brass people of the Benin Rivers, the deaths of Hausa princes during skirmishes in the Bida Emirate in 1897 and ongoing territorial rivalry with the French. Following the revoking of its charter on 31 December 1899, the Royal Niger Company sold its holdings to the British government for £865,000 (equivalent to £96,101,800 in 2025). On 1 January 1900 all its territories and assets passed to the British Crown. The surrendered territories together with the Niger Coast Protectorate were formed into Northern and Southern Protectorates of the Niger River. In 1914, the two protectorates were formally united and amalgamated as the Colony and Protectorate of Nigeria by Governor Lord Frederick Lugard.

== Memorials ==
An eagle lectern in Christ Church, Ivegill, was inscribed in his memory; it is now in Carlisle Cathedral. At the site of the massacre, a memorial cross was erected to the seven Britons killed.

== See also ==
- Colonisation of Africa
