= Godfrey Smith =

Godfrey Smith may refer to:

- Godfrey Smith (politician)
- Godfrey Smith (priest)
- Godfrey Smith (journalist)
