= Grandage =

Grandage is a given name and a surname. Notable people with the name include:

== Given name ==
- Grandage Powell (1882–1948), British bishop

== Surname ==
- Iain Grandage, Australian composer and music director
- Michael Grandage (born 1962), British theatre director
- Leigh Grandage, American musician
