= General Ologbosere =

African Resistance fighter

- Died: June 1899
- Other names: Chief Irabor
- Known for: masterminding an attack on a British expedition outside of Benin

General Ologbosere, also known as Chief Irabor, resisted the conquest of Benin Empire before he was captured and killed.

Ologbosore masterminded an attack on a British expedition outside of Benin, killing at least ten Europeans and 200 African carriers. He resisted the British invasion from 1897 to 1899. He was the second-in-command of the Benin military and stopped the first British invasion led by James Robert Phillips.

== History ==
The 1897 British military campaign sent the reigning king, Ovonramwen Nogbaisi, into exile and many chiefs of the kingdom surrendered or were captured. However, one of the war chiefs chose armed resistance instead.

Ologbosere had during this period been condemned to death in absentia by the British administration for having killed a previous British expedition that was on its way to Benin. That killing is said to have sparked the British punitive response in 1897.

Ologbosere, an army chief, hid among villages and towns that supported his actions, and for two years led a Gurerilla war of resistance against the British in Benin after the British expedition, he became a thorn in the flesh of the Royal British Empire that had replaced the oba(king)system in the kingdom, as he launched attacks against British outposts destroying the British outposts and flags.

=== Death ===
Ologbosere was captured. The British forces burned villages, destroyed crops, detained young people and incarcerated rulers. Eventually, war-weary villagers betrayed Ologbosere and his cohorts.

He was held responsible by the British for the killing of a British delegation to Benin City in 1897 and hanged in June 1899.

== See also ==
- Asoro
