= Richard Pratt (priest) =

British Anglican priest (born 1955)

Richard David Pratt (born 1955) is a British retired Anglican priest who served as the Archdeacon of West Cumberland and the Archdeacon of Carlisle (in the Church of England Diocese of Carlisle) since 2009.

Pratt was born in Cheltenham in 1955 and was educated at Ranelagh Grammar School and Lincoln College, Oxford. and ordained in 1984. Following a curacy at All Hallows' Wellingborough he held incumbencies at St Mark's Kingsthorpe and St Benedict's Hunsbury before his appointment as the communications officer for the Diocese of Carlisle in 1997, a position he held until his archdeacon’s appointment. On 24 January 2022, Pratt started a job-share arrangement with Stewart Fyfe as Archdeacon of West Cumberland; on that date, he legally ceased to be Archdeacon and became Associate Archdeacon. In 2023, he was appointed (instead) Archdeacon of Carlisle (one of two other archdeaconries of the same diocese). Pratt is also a bell ringer who served as the President of the Carlisle Diocesan Guild of Church Bell Ringers (CDGCBR).

Church of England titles
| Preceded by Colin Hill | Archdeacon of West Cumberland; 2009–2022 | Succeeded by Stewart Fyfe job-share with Pratt |
| Preceded by Lee Townend | Archdeacon of Carlisle | TBA |
