= George Hacker (bishop) =

English Anglican clergyman (1928–2025)

The Rt Revd George Hacker MA(Oxon)
- Bishop of Penrith
- Diocese: Diocese of Carlisle
- In office: 1979–1994
- Predecessor: Edward Pugh
- Successor: Richard Garrard
- Other posts: Honorary assistant bishop in Carlisle (1994–2025); Chaplain, St Boniface's College, Warminster (1959–1964)

Orders
- Ordination: 1954 (deacon); 1955 (priest)
- Consecration: 1979

Personal details
- Born: 27 April 1928
- Died: 30 April 2025 (aged 97)
- Denomination: Anglican
- Parents: Edward & Carla Lanyon
- Spouse: June Smart (m. 1969)
- Children: 1 son; 1 daughter
- Profession: Writer
- Education: Exeter College, Oxford

George Lanyon Hacker (27 April 1928 – 30 April 2025) was an English Anglican clergyman who was the sixth Suffragan Bishop of Penrith in the modern era.

== Biography ==
Hacker was educated at Kelly College, Tavistock and Exeter College, Oxford. He was ordained after a period of study at Cuddesdon in 1955. He began his career with a curacy at St Mary Redcliffe before spells as Chaplain at King's College London, Perpetual curate at the Church of the Good Shepherd, Bishopwearmouth and Rector of Tilehurst.

In 1979 he ascended to the Episcopate, a post he held for 15 years. In retirement, settling at Milburn, Cumbria, he continued to serve the church as an Assistant Bishop within his old diocese.

Hacker died on 30 April 2025, at the age of 97.

Church of England titles
Preceded by Edward Pugh	Bishop of Penrith; 1979–1994	Succeeded by Richard Garrard
