= Robert Freeman (bishop) =

British Anglican bishop

The Right Reverend Robert Freeman
- Bishop of Penrith
- Church: Church of England
- Diocese: Diocese of Carlisle
- In office: 2011–2018
- Predecessor: James Newcome
- Other post: Archdeacon of Halifax (2003–2011)

Orders
- Ordination: 1977 (deacon); 1978 (priest)
- Consecration: 28 October 2011

Personal details
- Born: 26 October 1952 (age 73) Cambridge, Cambridgeshire, United Kingdom
- Denomination: Anglican
- Spouse: Chris
- Children: Beccy, Anna, Cassie

Robert John Freeman (born 26 October 1952) is a British Anglican bishop. From 2011 until his 2018 retirement, he served as the Bishop of Penrith in the Church of England Diocese of Carlisle. Previously, he was the Archdeacon of Halifax (in the Diocese of Wakefield) from 2003 to 2011. From August 2018 he was appointed as Honorary Assistant Bishop in the Diocese of Leicester.

== Education ==
Freeman was educated at St John's College, Durham, then at Fitzwilliam College, Cambridge, where he trained for the Anglican ministry at Ridley Hall, Cambridge.

== Priestly career ==
Following his diaconal ordination in 1977, Freeman's first appointment was as a curate at St John's Church, Blackpool, in the Diocese of Blackburn, from 1977 to 1981. His next appointments were Team Vicar at Chigwell in the Diocese of Chelmsford from 1981 to 1985 and Vicar of the Church of the Martyrs, Leicester in the Diocese of Leicester from 1985 to 1999. From 1994 to 2003, he was an honorary canon of Leicester Cathedral. During that period he was Rural Dean of Christianity South from 1995 to 1998 and National Advisor in Evangelism for the Archbishops' Council from 1999 to 2003. From 2003 to 2011 he was Archdeacon of Halifax in the Diocese of Wakefield.

== Episcopal career ==
Freeman's nomination as Bishop of Penrith was announced on 10 June 2011, in succession to James Newcome who had been translated as the Bishop of Carlisle on 31 July 2009. He was consecrated on 28 October 2011 at York Minster by John Sentamu, Archbishop of York. On 3 November 2017, it was announced that Freeman was to retire effective "Easter" 2018.

== Personal life ==
Freeman is married to Chris and they have three daughters. His interests include time spent with family, computer technology and internet development, walking and travelling, classic Motown, electric blues and rock music, computer games, reluctant gardening, reading crime and action-adventure fiction.

== Styles ==
- The Reverend Robert Freeman (1977–1994)
- The Reverend Canon Robert Freeman (1994–2003)
- The Venerable Robert Freeman (2003–2011)
- The Right Reverend Robert Freeman (2011–present)
