= St Michael's Church, Pennington =

Coordinates: 54.1873°N 3.1312°W

- Church of St Michael and the Holy Angels, Pennington
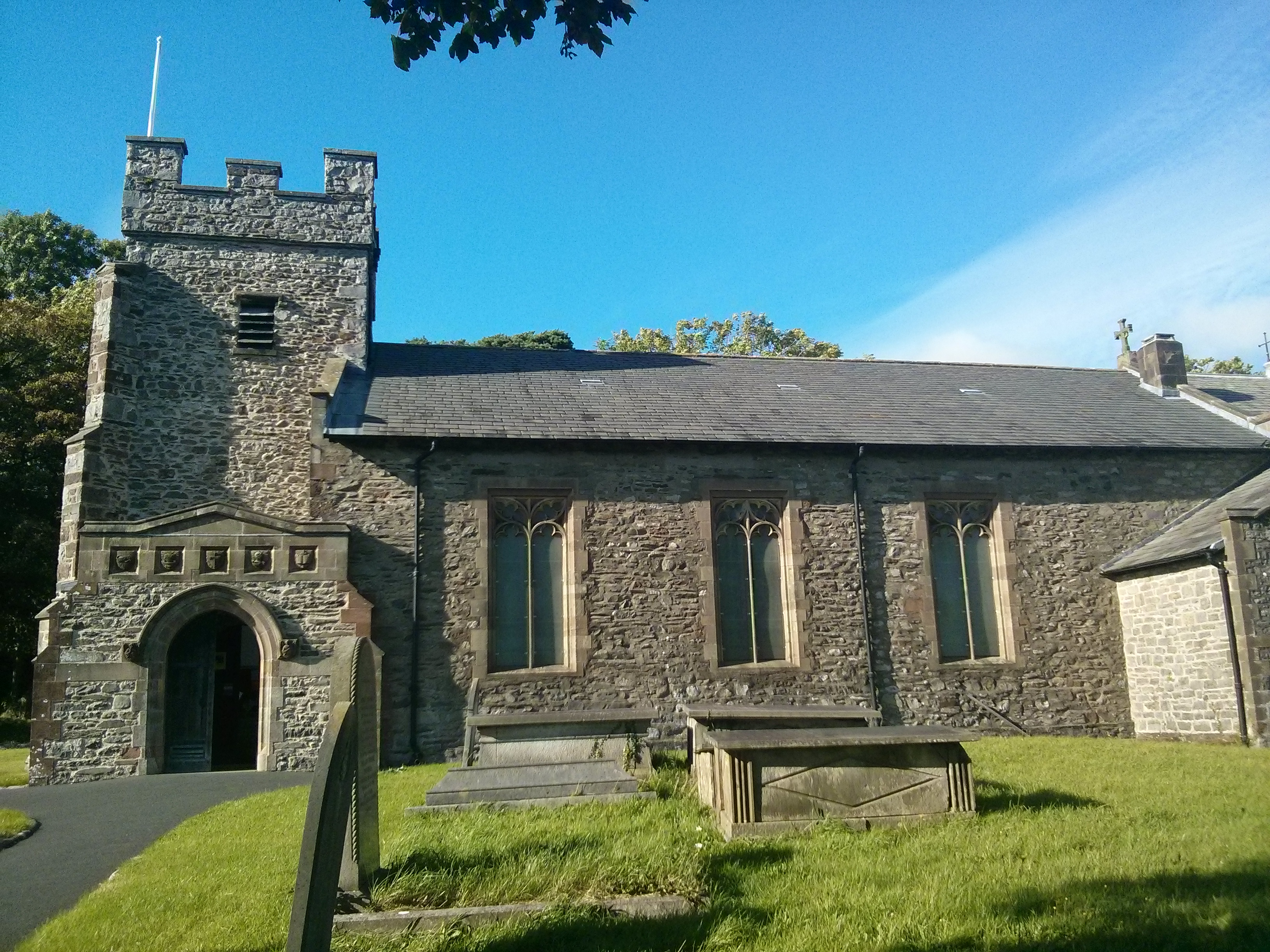
- St Michael's Church, Pennington, from the south

- Location in Cumbria
- OS grid reference: SD 263,774
- Location: Pennington, Cumbria
- Country: England
- Denomination: Anglican
- Website: St Michael, Pennington

History
- Status: Parish church

Architecture
- Functional status: Active
- Heritage designation: Grade II
- Designated: 5 March 1990
- Architect: Henry Paley
- Architectural type: Church
- Style: Gothic Revival
- Groundbreaking: 1826
- Completed: 1934

Specifications
- Materials: Stone, slate roofs

Administration
- Province: York
- Diocese: Carlisle
- Archdeaconry: Westmorland and Furness
- Deanery: Furness
- Parish: Pennington

Clergy
- Vicar: Revd Gary Tubbs

St Michael's Church is in the village of Pennington, Cumbria, England. It is an active Anglican parish church in the deanery of Furness, the archdeaconry of Westmorland and Furness, and the diocese of Carlisle. Its benefice is united with those of Holy Trinity, Bardsea, and St Peter, Lindal and Marton. The church is recorded in the National Heritage List for England as a designated Grade II listed building.

== History ==
The church stands on an ancient site, but the oldest parts of the present church are the nave and the tower that were built in 1826–27. In 1917 the Lancaster architect Henry Paley of Austin and Paley prepared plans for a complete rebuilding of the church, but this was considered to be too expensive. Further plans were made that involved adding a polygonal chancel, removing the ceiling, opening the tower arch, inserting new windows, reseating the church, and carrying out a general restoration of the existing building. This was completed for the church's centenary at a cost of £5,708 (equivalent to £300,000 in 2025). In 1934 the same architect added an organ chamber and a new aisle at a cost of £666.

== Architecture ==
St Michael's is constructed in stone rubble with ashlar dressings, and has slate roofs. Its plan consists of a four-bay nave, a south porch, an apsidal chancel, a south organ chamber with an aisle, and a west tower. The tower has diagonal buttresses, a two-light west window, straight-headed bell openings, and an embattled parapet. The nave windows have two-lights and straight heads, and contain Decorated tracery. The east window has five lights, and the window in the organ chamber has three lights. Inset into the wall of the inner entrance to the church is a Norman tympanum carved with runes, and the image of Christ and a cross. There are also damaged Norman capitals built into the porch, and fragments of carved stones elsewhere inside the church. The octagonal font is medieval and is tulip-shaped. All the stained glass was made by Powell. The two-manual pipe organ was made by Jardine and Company of Manchester.

== External features ==
In the churchyard is a sundial listed at Grade II. It is dated 1680 and consists of an octagonal post on a square base with a square cap.

== See also ==
- Listed buildings in Pennington, Cumbria
- List of ecclesiastical works by Austin and Paley (1916–44)
