= Michael Leyden =

British Anglican bishop

The Right Reverend Michael John Leyden
- Bishop of Penrith
- Church: Church of England
- Diocese: Diocese of Carlisle
- In office: 2026 to present
- Predecessor: Rob Saner-Haigh

Orders
- Ordination: 2011 (deacon); 2012 (priest)
- Consecration: 30 April 2026

Personal details
- Born: Michael John Leyden; 1985 (age 40–41)
- Denomination: Anglicanism
- Education: St Peter's College, Oxford (BA, MA); University of Chester (PhD)

Michael John Leyden (born 1985) is a British Anglican bishop. He is currently the Bishop of Penrith.

== Early life and education ==
He was educated at St Peter's College, Oxford and the University of Chester.

== Ordained ministry ==
He was ordained deacon in 2011, and priest in 2012. He was curate of Rainhill then vicar of Weston with Shavington. He became the founding Dean of Emmanuel Theological College in 2021.

On 26 April 2026, it was announced that he was to become Bishop of Penrith in the Diocese of Carlisle. He was consecrated as a bishop by Stephen Cottrell, Archbishop of York, on 30 April 2026 during a service in York Minster.
