= Alan Davis (priest) =

Anglican Archdeacon (1938–2021)

Alan Norman Davis (27 July 1938 – 3 March 2021) was an Anglican priest who was Archdeacon of West Cumberland from 1996 until 2004.

Davis was educated at King Edward's School, Birmingham; Durham University and Lichfield Theological College; and ordained in 1966. After a curacy in Birmingham at St Luke's, Kingstanding (1965–68), he was Priest in charge at St Paul, Sheffield, then Vicar of St James and St Christopher, Shiregreen. He was Team Rector of Maltby from 1980 to 1989; Archbishop of York's Officer for Urban Priority Areas from 1990 to 1992; and Communications Officer for the Diocese of Carlisle from 1992 to 1996.

He died in 2021, aged 82.

Church of England titles
Preceded by John Richard Packer	Archdeacon of West Cumberland; 1996–2004	Succeeded by Colin Hill
