= David Jenkins (Archdeacon of Westmorland and Furness) =

David Thomas Ivor Jenkins (3 June 1928 – 16 September 2014) was Archdeacon of Westmorland and Furness from 1995 until 1999.

Jenkins was educated at King's College London and ordained in 1953. After a curacy at Rugby he held incumbencies in Coventry and Carlisle. He was a Canon Residentiary at Carlisle Cathedral from 1991 to 1995.

== Notes ==
Church of England titles
Preceded by Lawrie Peat	Archdeacon of Westmorland and Furness; 1995–1999	Succeeded by George Howe
