= Cyril Bulley =

English bishop

Sydney Cyril Bulley (12 June 1907 – 20 November 1989) was an English bishop.

He was born on 12 June 1907 and educated at the University of Durham. He was a member of St Chad's College. He began his ministry as a curate at Newark and was then successively vicar of Worksop (1942), Rural Dean of Mansfield (1946), Director of Religious Education in the Diocese of Carlisle and Archdeacon of Westmorland and Furness (c.1950) before his ordination to the episcopate, initially as the Suffragan Bishop of Penrith (1959–1966) and then as Bishop of Carlisle (1966–1972). In 1972 he was an awarded an honorary doctorate by Durham.

A noted author, his works included the autobiographical “The Glass of Time”, published in 1981, “Faith, Fire and Fun”, 1985 and “Glimpses of the Divine”, 1987 He was also a Cumbrian enthusiast. He retired in 1972 and died on 20 November 1989.

Church of England titles
| Preceded by Herbert Victor Turner | Bishop of Penrith; 1959 – 1966 | Succeeded by Reginald Foskett |
| Preceded by Thomas Bloomer | Bishop of Carlisle; 1966 – 1972 | Succeeded by Henry David Halsey |
