= John Cooper (archdeacon of Westmorland) =

Archdeacon of Westmorland

John Cooper was Archdeacon of Westmorland from 1865 until 1896.

Cooper was educated at Trinity College, Cambridge, graduating B.A. in 1835. He was Vicar of Kendal from 1858 and Canon of Carlisle from 1861 until his death on 25 July 1896.
