= Bill Hardie =

Archibald George "Bill" Hardie (19 December 1908 – 28 February 1997) was Archdeacon of West Cumberland from 1971 until 1979.

The son of the Most Rev. William George Hardie (Archbishop of the West Indies from 1945 to 1949), he was educated at St. Lawrence College, Ramsgate; Trinity College, Cambridge and Westcott House, Cambridge; and ordained in 1935. After a curacy at All Hallows, Lombard Street he was Chaplain at Repton School from 1936 to 1938; Vicar of St Alban, Golders Green from 1938 to 1944; Rector of Hexham Abbey from 1944 to 63; and Vicar and Rural Dean of Halifax from 1963 until 1971.

Church of England titles
Preceded by Edward Pugh	Archdeacon of West Cumberland; 1971–1979	Succeeded by Burnham Hodgson
