= Burnham Hodgson =

Archdeacon of West Cumberland (1926–2020)

(Thomas Richard) Burnham Hodgson (17 August 1926 - 30 September 2020) was Archdeacon of West Cumberland from 1979 until 1991.

Hodgson was educated at Heversham Grammar School and the London College of Divinity; and ordained in 1953. He held curacies at Keswick and Stanwix and incumbencies in Whitehaven, Aikton, Raughton Head and Grange-over-Sands. Hodgson was a member of the General Synod of the Church of England from 1983 until 1990.

Church of England titles
Preceded by Archibald George Hardie	Archdeacon of West Cumberland; 1979–1991	Succeeded by John Richard Packer
