= Colin Hill (priest) =

English Anglican priest and author

Colin Hill (born 4 September 1942) is an English Anglican priest and author.

== Biography ==
Hill was born on 4 September 1942, educated at the University of Leicester and Ripon College, Oxford ordained in 1967 Following curacies in Leicestershire he was vicar of St Thomas and St James, Worsbrough Dale from 1972 to 1978. He was then Churches Planning Officer for Mission and Ministry in Telford, Rural Dean in both Lichfield and Hereford Dioceses and Prebendary of Hereford Cathedral before becoming a canon residentiary and diocesan secretary at Carlisle Cathedral in 1996. He gained his Doctorate in 1988 (Living in two worlds: A study of the variety and characteristics of church life and policies in selected Church of England parishes. PhD thesis Open University). He was the archdeacon of West Cumberland from 2004 until his retirement in 2008.

Church of England titles
Preceded by Alan Norman Davis	Archdeacon of West Cumberland; 2004–2008	Succeeded by Richard David Pratt
