= Harold Mulliner =

Archdeacon of Westmorland

Harold George Mulliner (18 September 1897 – 1 July 1946) Archdeacon of Westmorland from 1944 until his death.

He was educated at Birkenhead School and held a Commission with the King's Liverpool Regiment and was wounded in France. When peace returned he completed his studies at Hertford College, Oxford and Ripon College Cuddesdon; and was ordained in 1925. He served curacies in Caversham, Garston and Southport. He was the Vicar of North Stainley from 1929 to 1937; Domestic Chaplain to the Bishop of Ripon from 1929 to 1935; and Residentiary Canon and Chancellor of Truro Cathedral from 1937 to 1944.
