= Henry Lafone =

Henry Pownall Malins Lafone (1867 - 1955) was an Anglican Archdeacon in the first half of the Twentieth century.

He was educated at Trinity College, Cambridge and Wells Theological College; and ordained in 1890. After a curacy at St Mary's Church, Portsea he held incumbencies in Ambleside, Carlisle, Kendal, Barrow-in-Furness and Cartmel. He was Archdeacon of Furness from 1912 to 1923; and of Westmorland from 1923 to 1931.

He was a JP in Kendal from 1934 until his death on 23 March 1955.
