= Lawrie Peat =

Church of England clergyman

Lawrence Joseph Peat (29 August 1928 – 16 March 2018) was a Church of England priest who was Archdeacon of Westmorland and Furness from 1989 until 1995.

== Education and career ==
Initially, Peat was unsure whether to take up ordained ministry. However, eventually, he was educated at Lincoln Theological College and ordained in 1958. After a curacy at Bramley he served incumbencies in Stockport, Leeds, Southend-on-Sea, Longsleddale and Kirkby Lonsdale.

== Retirement ==
From 2013, Peat attended St Mary's Church, Whitkirk, Leeds, where his youngest son was the Vicar.

Peat died on 16 March 2018.

Church of England titles
Preceded by Peter Vaughan	Archdeacon of Westmorland and Furness; 1989–1995	Succeeded by David Jenkins
