= Godfrey Smith (priest) =

Anglican Priest

- Born: 14 July 1878
- Died: 1 August 1944 (aged 66)
- Education: Charterhouse; Magdalen College, Oxford; Wells Theological College
- Occupation: Anglican Priest
- Years active: 1903–1944
- Known for: Archdeacon of Furness

Godfrey Smith (14 July 1878 – 1 August 1944) was Archdeacon of Furness from 1926 until his death.

He was educated at Charterhouse, Magdalen College, Oxford and Wells Theological College; and ordained in 1903. After curacies in Barrow-in-Furness and Grange-over-Sands he held incumbencies at Walney Island, Cartmel, Wentworth, South Yorkshire (where he was also Chaplain to the 7th Earl Fitzwilliam and Haverthwaite.

== Notes ==
Church of England titles
Preceded by Campbell West-Watson	Bishop of Penrith; 1926–1944	Succeeded by Herbert Turner
