= William Sherwen =

Archdeacon of Westmorland

William Sherwen was Archdeacon of Westmorland from 1901 until his death on 1 March 1915.

He was educated at The Queen's College, Oxford; and was ordained in 1860. He served curacies in Cold Brayfield, Bishopwearmouth, Sedgefield and Dean. He was Rural Dean of Cockermouth and Workington from 1882 to 1901.
