= Elizabeth Everest =

Nursery nurse to Winston Churchill (c. 1832 – 1895)

- Born: 13th February 1834; Chatham, England
- Died: 3 July 1895 (aged 61)
- Occupation: Nanny

Elizabeth Ann Everest (13 February 1834 – 3 July 1895) was an English nurse and nanny, notable for being an important figure in the early life of Winston Churchill.

== Biography ==
She was born in Chatham, Kent, the daughter of William and Ann Everest. On the 17th, August 1834, she was baptised at the Ebenezer Chapel, Clover Street, Chatham. She was never married; "Mrs" was an honorific given to nannies and cooks as a courtesy. One of her early jobs was for the family of Thompson Phillips, a clergyman in Cumberland, where she brought up Ella Phillips for 12 years. The 1861 census shows that she was then aged 27 and was working as a servant for the May family at 5 Cambridge Terrace, Lee, Kent. They had four young children, and Mr May was an Underwriter.

She went into service with the Churchill family at the beginning of 1875, a month after Winston's birth. Later she was responsible for his younger brother Jack as well. Lord Randolph Churchill and Jennie Jerome Churchill were very active in society but emotionally distant, even neglectful, of their son. Young Winston became very close with his nanny and addressed her as "Woom," the nearest he could get to saying "Woman." Churchill wrote in his autobiography, My Early Life : "I loved my mother dearly - but at a distance. My nurse was my confidante. Mrs Everest it was who looked after me and tended all my wants. It was to her I poured out all my many troubles."

She remained with the family until 1893, when she was let go. Churchill biographer William Manchester wrote that her firing was handled abruptly and poorly, given her long and devoted service to the family. She then returned to the Thomson Phillips family - he was by then an archdeacon in Barrow-in-Furness - and lived there for about a year. Her final home was with her sister, 15 Crouch Hill in Finsbury Park, North London.

Everest died there of peritonitis on 3 July 1895. Churchill telegraphed the Venerable Thompson Phillips, and the two men attended the funeral service together (although her other charge, Ella, did not). Churchill wrote, "[Phillips] had a long memory for faithful service."

Churchill paid for Everest's headstone in the City of London Cemetery and Crematorium, Newham, Greater London. His son, Randolph, wrote, "For many years afterwards he paid an annual sum to the local florist for the upkeep of the grave." Inspection of the headstone shows the wording “by Winston Spencer Churchill” at the base with "Jack Spencer Churchill" reported to be below that wording.

== Other articles ==
- Churchill by Roy Jenkins
- The Last Lion: Winston Spencer Churchill by William Manchester
- Young Winston, a film featuring Churchill and Mrs. Everest
