= Thomas Bloomer =

English bishop

Bloomer in 1950.

Thomas Bloomer (14 July 1894 – 5 January 1984) was an English bishop. He was educated at the Royal School Dungannon and Trinity College, Dublin. He began his ministry as a curate at Carrickfergus. Later he was Vicar of St Mark's, Bath and then Vicar and Rural Dean of Barking before his ordination to the episcopate as Bishop of Carlisle. He was consecrated a bishop on St Luke's day (18 October) 1946, by Cyril Garbett, Archbishop of York, at York Minster; his brother, James Bloomer, then-Rector of Armagh, preached. He retired as bishop in 1966, and died on 5 January 1984.

Church of England titles
| Preceded by Henry Williams | Bishop of Carlisle; 1946–1966 | Succeeded by Cyril Bulley |
