= Edward Pugh (bishop) =

Bishop

William Edward Augustus Pugh (known as Edward; 22 July 1909 – 4 January 1986) was the fifth Bishop of Penrith in the modern era.

He was educated at Leeds University and the College of the Resurrection, Mirfield. Ordained in 1934 he began his career with a curacy at Staveley, Derbyshire. From here he became Vicar of Norwell, Nottinghamshire and then Harrington, Cumbria along with his appointment as the first Archdeacon of West Cumberland. Appointment to the episcopate followed in 1970 – he was consecrated at York Minster on Michaelmas day (29 September) 1970 – and he retired nine years later.

Church of England titles
Preceded by Reginald Foskett	Bishop of Penrith; 1970–1979	Succeeded by George Hacker
