= Lords Spiritual (Women) Act 2015 =

Act of the Parliament of the United Kingdom

Lords Spiritual (Women) Act 2015 (Note: Section 2(3).)
- Act of Parliament
- Parliament of the United Kingdom
- Long title: An Act to make time-limited provision for vacancies among the Lords Spiritual to be filled by bishops who are women.
- Citation: 2015 c. 18
- Introduced by: Nick Clegg, Deputy Prime Minister of the United Kingdom (Commons); Lord Faulks, Minister of State for Civil Justice and Legal Policy (Lords)
- Territorial extent: England and Wales; Scotland; Northern Ireland; (Note: Section 2(2).)

Dates
- Royal assent: 26 March 2015
- Commencement: 18 May 2015 (Note: Section 2(1).)
Other legislation
Amended by	Lords Spiritual (Women) Act 2015 (Extension) Act 2025
Relates to	Bishoprics Act 1878

Status: Amended

History of passage through Parliament

Text of statute as originally enacted

Revised text of statute as amended

Lords Spiritual (Women) Act 2015 (Extension) Act 2025 (Note: Section 2(3).)
- Act of Parliament
- Parliament of the United Kingdom
- Long title: An Act to extend the period within which vacancies among the Lords Spiritual are to be filled by bishops who are women.
- Citation: 2025 c. 1
- Introduced by: Pat McFadden MP, Chancellor of the Duchy of Lancaster (Commons); Baroness Smith, Leader of the House of Lords (Lords)
- Territorial extent: England and Wales; Scotland; Northern Ireland; (Note: Section 2(2).)

Dates
- Royal assent: 16 January 2025
- Commencement: 16 January 2025 (Note: Section 2(2).)
Other legislation
Amends	Lords Spiritual (Women) Act 2015

Status: Current legislation

History of passage through Parliament

Text of statute as originally enacted

Revised text of statute as amended

Bishoprics Act 1878 (Note: Section 1.)
- Act of Parliament
- Parliament of the United Kingdom
- Long title: An Act to provide for the foundation of four new Bishoprics in England.
- Citation: 41 & 42 Vict. c. 68
- Territorial extent: United Kingdom

Dates
- Royal assent: 16 August 1878
- Commencement: 16 August 1878 (Note: The Acts of Parliament (Commencement) Act 1793.)
Other legislation
Amends	London Diocese Act 1863; Bishopric of Saint Albans Act 1875
Amended by	Statute Law (Repeals) Act 1973
Relates to	Queen Anne's Bounty Act 1703; Queen Anne's Bounty Act 1803

Status: Amended

Text of statute as originally enacted

Revised text of statute as amended

The Lords Spiritual (Women) Act 2015 (c. 18) is an act of the Parliament of the United Kingdom. It states that whenever a vacancy arises among the Lords Spiritual during the next ten years after the act comes into force, the position has to be filled by a woman, if there is one who is eligible. In this case, the act supersedes section 5 of the Bishoprics Act 1878 (41 & 42 Vict. c. 68), which would otherwise require "the issue of a writ of summons to that bishop of a see in England who having been longest bishop of a see in England has not previously become entitled to such writ". It does not apply to the five sees of Canterbury, York, London, Durham or Winchester, which are always represented in the House of Lords.

The act was passed half a year after the Bishops and Priests (Consecration and Ordination of Women) Measure 2014 authorised the Church of England to appoint women as bishops.

In 2024, the Labour Starmer ministry government introduced a bill to Parliament to extend the act's provisions by five more years (until 18 May 2030). The Lords Spiritual (Women) Act 2015 (Extension) Act 2025 (c. 1) received royal assent on 16 January 2025.

== The act in practice ==
The first female diocesan bishop, and thus the first female Lord Spiritual due to this act, was Rachel Treweek in 2015. Consecrated Bishop of Gloucester on 22 July 2015 and enthroned on 19 September 2015, she joined the Lords on 7 September 2015 with the full title The Rt Rev. the Lord Bishop of Gloucester, and was introduced to the House by the Archbishop of Canterbury and the Bishop of London on 26 October 2015. She made her maiden speech on 7 March 2016.

Since then, Christine Hardman (2016, retired 2021), Viv Faull (2018), Libby Lane (2019), Guli Francis-Dehqani (2021), Helen-Ann Hartley (2023), Debbie Sellin (2024), and Sophie Jelley (2025) have also entered the Lords due to this Act shortly after becoming diocesan bishops. Therefore 8 out of 22 vacant Lords positions occurring in the ten years of the original Act (May 2015 to May 2025) were filled by women. (Note: Christopher Lowson, Warner, Henderson, David Walker, Atwell, Paul Bayes, Watson, Seeley, Williams, Snow, Ipgrave, Wilcox, Usher, Jackson were the new male Lords in this time.) Without the Act, Treweek and Hardman would only have become Lords Spiritual in late 2021. (Note: In May 2021, there were still five non-Lord diocesan bishops with longer length of service than Treweek, so Treweek and Hardman would then have been next in line in the absence of this act, and consequently entered the Lords with the next vacancies in autumn 2021; see List of bishops in the Church of England.)

In addition (and independently of the act), Sarah Mullally entered the Lords ex officio when appointed Bishop of London in 2018.

On 30 July 2024, Baroness Smith of Basildon, the Leader of the House of Lords, introduced a bill to extend the act by 5 years to 18 May 2030. The Lords Spiritual (Women) Act 2015 (Extension) Act 2025 came into force on royal assent on 16 January 2025.

== See also ==
- List of bishops in the Church of England, which lists the current Lords Spiritual and the seniority of service of the other diocesan bishops
- Women in the House of Lords
