= Grandage Powell =

20th-century Anglican bishop

Grandage Edwards Powell (20 November 1882 – 5 March 1948) was an Anglican bishop in the second quarter of the 20th century.

Powell was born in Fallowfield, Lancashire, into a clerical family, the son of Rev. Astell Drayner Powell, sometime Canon of Manchester Cathedral, and Annie Edwards, daughter of Thomas Grandage Edwards. He was educated at Rugby and University College, Oxford and ordained in 1906. After curacies in Fallowfield and Blackburn he rose rapidly in the Church of England hierarchy becoming successively vicar of St Matthew's West Kensington, Rural Dean of Leicester and Archdeacon of Carlisle. After four years in Cumberland he was ordained to the episcopate as the Suffragan Bishop of Penrith.

He married Madeline Mary Allen, by whom he had two sons. He resigned after a serious illness in April 1944 and died four years later.

Church of England titles
| Preceded by In abeyance | Bishop of Penrith; 1939 – 1944 | Succeeded by Herbert Victor Turner |
