= Rob Saner-Haigh =

British Anglican bishop

The Right Reverend Rob Saner-Haigh
- Bishop of Carlisle
- Church: Church of England
- Diocese: Diocese of Carlisle
- In office: 2025 to present
- Predecessor: Rt Revd James Newcombe

Orders
- Ordination: 2005 (deacon); 2006 (priest)
- Consecration: 15 July 2022

Personal details
- Born: Robert James Saner-Haigh; 1973 (age 52–53)
- Denomination: Anglicanism
- Education: University of Birmingham (BA, MPhil); Wycliffe Hall, Oxford (BA)

Robert James Saner-Haigh (born 1973) is a British Anglican bishop. He is currently the Bishop of Carlisle, having previously been the Bishop of Penrith — the sole suffragan bishop of the Diocese of Carlisle — from 2022 to 2025. Before this he was a residentiary canon of Newcastle Cathedral and Director of Mission and Ministry for the Diocese of Newcastle since 2020.

== Early life and education ==
He was educated at Birmingham University, graduating with a BA in Ancient History and Archaeology in 1994 and an MPhil in Archaeology in 1998, followed by training for ministry at Wycliffe Hall, Oxford, receiving a BA in 2004, upgraded to an MA in 2008.

== Ordained ministry ==
He was ordained deacon in 2005, and priest in 2006. He was curate of Appleby-in-Westmorland in the Diocese of Carlisle from 2005 to 2007, then from 2007 to 2010 held the joint post of bishop's domestic chaplain, and curate of Dalston with Cumdivock, in the same diocese. From 2008 to 2010, he was also director of ordinands for the diocese.

In 2010, he was appointed priest in charge of Kendal Parish Church, and held that position until 2020 when he became a residentiary canon of Newcastle Cathedral and Director of Mission and Ministry for the Diocese of Newcastle.

On 27 May 2022, it was announced that he was to become Bishop of Penrith in the Diocese of Carlisle. He was consecrated as a bishop by Stephen Cottrell, Archbishop of York, on 15 July 2022 during a service in York Minster. Following the retirement of James Newcome as Bishop of Carlisle in August 2023, Saner-Haigh was acting diocesan bishop of the Diocese of Carlisle.

On 9 May 2025, it was announced that he would become the Bishop of Carlisle.His election was confirmed on the 1 September 2025 and he was installed at Carlisle Cathedral on 29 November 2025.

=== Views ===
He holds a "traditional view of Holy Matrimony" (i.e. one man and one woman).
