= James Newcome =

British Anglican bishop (born 1953)

The Right Reverend James Newcome KCVO DL
- Bishop of Carlisle
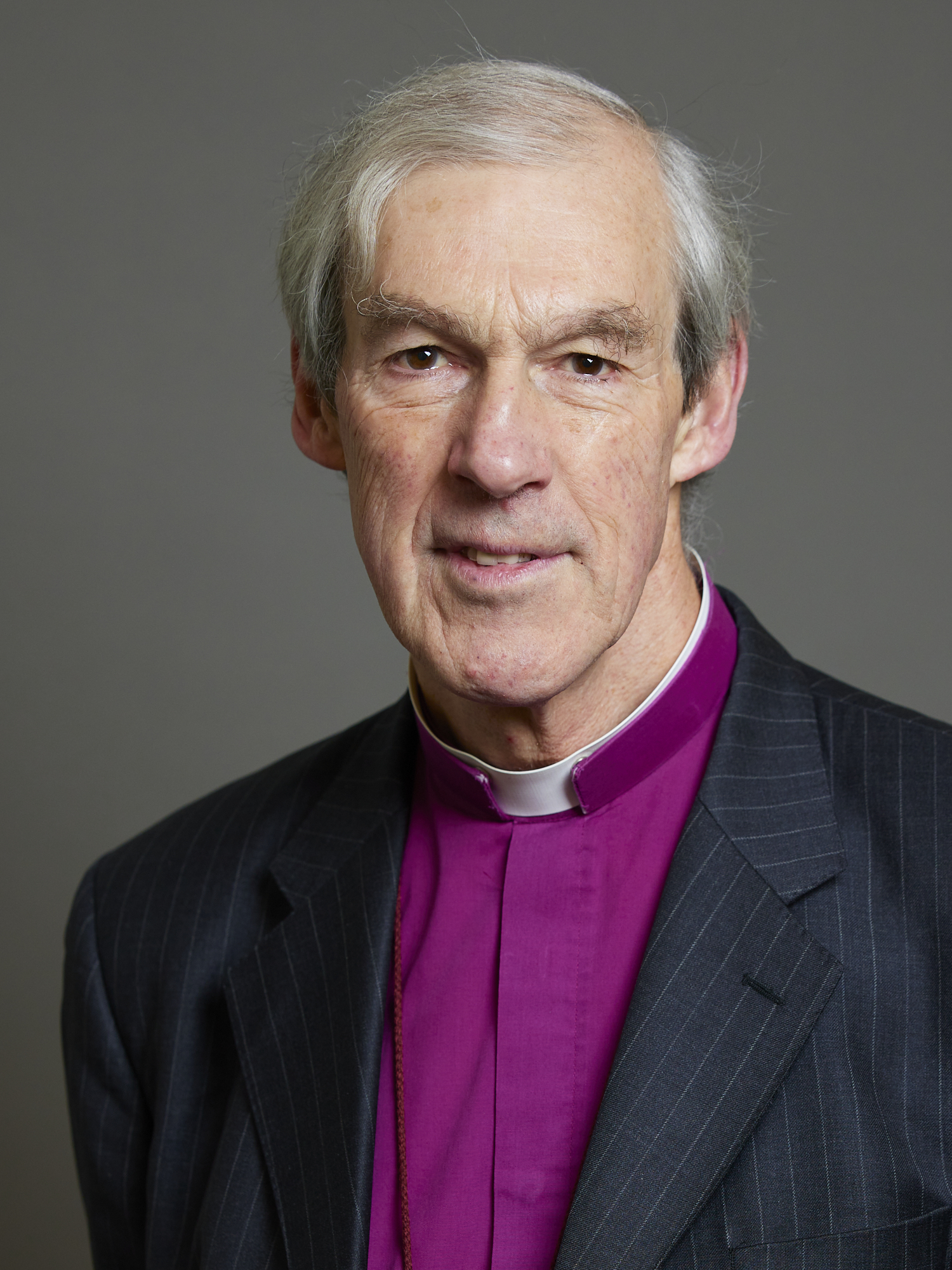
- Official portrait, 2022
- Church: Church of England
- Diocese: Diocese of Carlisle
- In office: 2009–2023
- Predecessor: Graham Dow
- Other post: Clerk of the Closet (2014–2023)
- Previous post: Bishop of Penrith (2002–2009)

Orders
- Ordination: 24 September 1978 (deacon); 30 September 1979 (priest) by Robert Runcie
- Consecration: 19 March 2002

Personal details
- Born: 24 July 1953 (age 73) Aldershot, Hampshire, England
- Denomination: Anglican
- Residence: Bishop's House, Keswick
- Spouse: Alison Newcome (m. 1977)
- Children: 4
- Occupation: former ambulance driver
- Profession: former military officer
- Education: Trinity College, Oxford

Member of the House of Lords
- Lord Spiritual
- Bishop of Carlisle; 23 October 2013 – 31 August 2023

James William Scobie Newcome KCVO DL (born 24 July 1953) is a retired English Anglican bishop and former Lord Spiritual. From 2009 until retirement, he was the Bishop of Carlisle, the diocesan bishop of the Diocese of Carlisle; he was also a member of the House of Lords as a Lord Spiritual from October 2013. From 2002 to 2009, he was the Bishop of Penrith, the suffragan bishop in the same diocese.

== Early life ==
He was born in Aldershot, the son of an officer in the Royal Artillery. As a result of his father's army postings, he spent time in Malta and Germany during his childhood. He then attended Marlborough College from 1966 to 1971, where he was Senior Prefect, and worked for Community Service Volunteers in children's homes in Nottinghamshire.

In 1971, he matriculated into Trinity College, Oxford to study modern history. He won the University of Oxford history of art prize in 1972. He graduated with a Bachelor of Arts (BA) degree in 1974; his BA was promoted to Master of Arts (MA Oxon) degree in 1978.

He was commissioned as a second lieutenant on the General List of the Territorial Army on 23 May 1974. He then spent a year working as an ambulance driver in Stevenage. He later resigned his TA commission on 8 July 1977.

From 1975, he studied at the University of Cambridge, where he read theology at Selwyn College, Cambridge, whilst also preparing for ordination at Ridley Hall, Cambridge. He graduated Bachelor of Arts (BA) in 1977; this was promoted to Master of Arts (MA Cantab) in 1981.

== Ordained ministry ==
Newcome was ordained a deacon at Michaelmas 1978 (24 September) at St Mary's, Watford and a priest the following Michaelmas (30 September 1979) at St Albans Cathedral – both times by Robert Runcie when he was Bishop of St Albans. His ordained ministry began as a curate at All Saints' Leavesden in the Diocese of St Albans. He was ordained a priest in 1979 and remained at All Saints until 1982.

Newcome was then appointed Vicar of Bar Hill and Dry Drayton in the Diocese of Ely in 1982. He also became a tutor and lecturer in Pastoral Theology, Ethics and Integrating Theology at the Cambridge Federation of Theological Colleges from 1983 to 1988. He was Rural Dean of the Northstowe Deanery from 1988 to 1994. In 1994 he was appointed a canon residentiary at Chester Cathedral also holding the Diocesan posts of Director of Ordinands from 1994 to 2000 and Director of Ministry, Education and Training from 1996 to 2002.

=== Episcopal ministry ===
In March 2002, Newcome was appointed Bishop of Penrith, a suffragan bishop in the Diocese of Carlisle; he was consecrated a bishop at York Minster on 19 March 2002. In May 2009, he was announced as the next Bishop of Carlisle, the diocesan bishop of the Diocese of Carlisle. He was enthroned at Carlisle Cathedral on 10 October 2009.

On 3 October 2013, Newcome joined the House of Lords as a Lord Spiritual.

On 17 November 2014, it was announced that Newcome had been appointed Clerk of the Closet. As such, he was head of the College of Chaplains of the Ecclesiastical Household and undertook a number of ceremonial roles such as presenting new diocesan bishops to the monarch. He was also a senior advisor to the sovereign on spiritual affairs.

He was a chaplain to the Royal British Legion, and officiated at the 2016, 2017 and 2018 Festival of Remembrance at the Royal Albert Hall. He was asked to step back from the role in 2020 after he gave a character reference to a clergyman of the Diocese of Carlisle who was being prosecuted for child sexual abuse: the clergyman was found guilty and sentenced to eight years and four months in prison. Newcome later retracted the reference and described it as "error of judgement". Newcome was investigated by the Church of England's National Safeguarding Team which resulted in him receiving an "informal rebuke" and a requirement to undergo further safeguarding training.

In March 2023, it was announced that Newcome would retire as Bishop of Carlisle effective 31 August 2023. In his role as Clerk of the Closet, he took part in the Royal procession at the 2023 Coronation 6 May 2023. A service of thanksgiving and farewell was held on 16 July at Carlisle Cathedral to mark his retirement.

Upon relinquishing his appointment as Clerk of the Closet in November 2023, King Charles III appointed him a Knight Commander of the Royal Victorian Order (KCVO).

=== Views ===
He holds a "traditional view of Holy Matrimony" (i.e. one man and one woman).

In 2023, following the news that the House of Bishop's of the Church of England was to introduce proposals for blessing same-sex relationships, he signed an open letter which stated:

many Christians in the Church of England and the Anglican Communion, together with Christians from across the churches of world Christianity, continue to believe that marriage is given by God for the union of a man and woman and that it cannot be extended to those who are of the same sex. [...] Without seeking to diminish the value of many committed same-sex relationships, for which there is much to give thanks, we find ourselves constrained by what we sincerely believe the Scriptures teach which cannot be set aside.

== Personal life ==
Newcome married Alison, a health visitor, in 1977, and they have four adult children. He is a keen amateur runner, squash player and hill walker, and also enjoys films and restoring furniture.

Newcome was appointed a deputy lieutenant for Cumbria in 2013. He was a governor of St. Bees School which announced that, after 432 years, it was closing in March 2015. It reopened in 2018.

Church of England titles
Preceded by Richard Garrard	Bishop of Penrith; 2002–2009	Succeeded by Robert Freeman
Preceded by Graham Dow	Bishop of Carlisle; 2009–2023	TBA
Preceded by Christopher Hill	Clerk of the Closet; 2014–2023	Succeeded by Richard Jackson
