= Vernon Ross =

Archdeacon of Westmorland and Furness

Vernon Ross (born 13 April 1957) has been Archdeacon of Westmorland and Furness since 2017.

Vernon Ross was educated at Portsmouth Polytechnic and Trinity College, Bristol. He was ordained in 1991. Following a curacy in Fareham he was Priest in charge at Witheridge then Team Rector of Barnstaple from 2000 to 2008. Then he was Vicar of The Fyfield Benefice and Mission and Ministry Advisor for the Barking Episcopal Area from 2008 to 2015. He was full-time Mission and Ministry Advisor and Assistant Area Dean of Epping Forest and Ongar Deanery from 2015 to 2017. Chelmsford Diocese, firstly at Fyfield and latterly at Chigwell.

Church of England titles
Preceded by Penny Driver	Archdeacon of Carlisle; 2017–	Succeeded by Incumbent
