= James Wallace Sleigh =

British Army general (1775–1865)

General Sir James Wallace Sleigh KCB
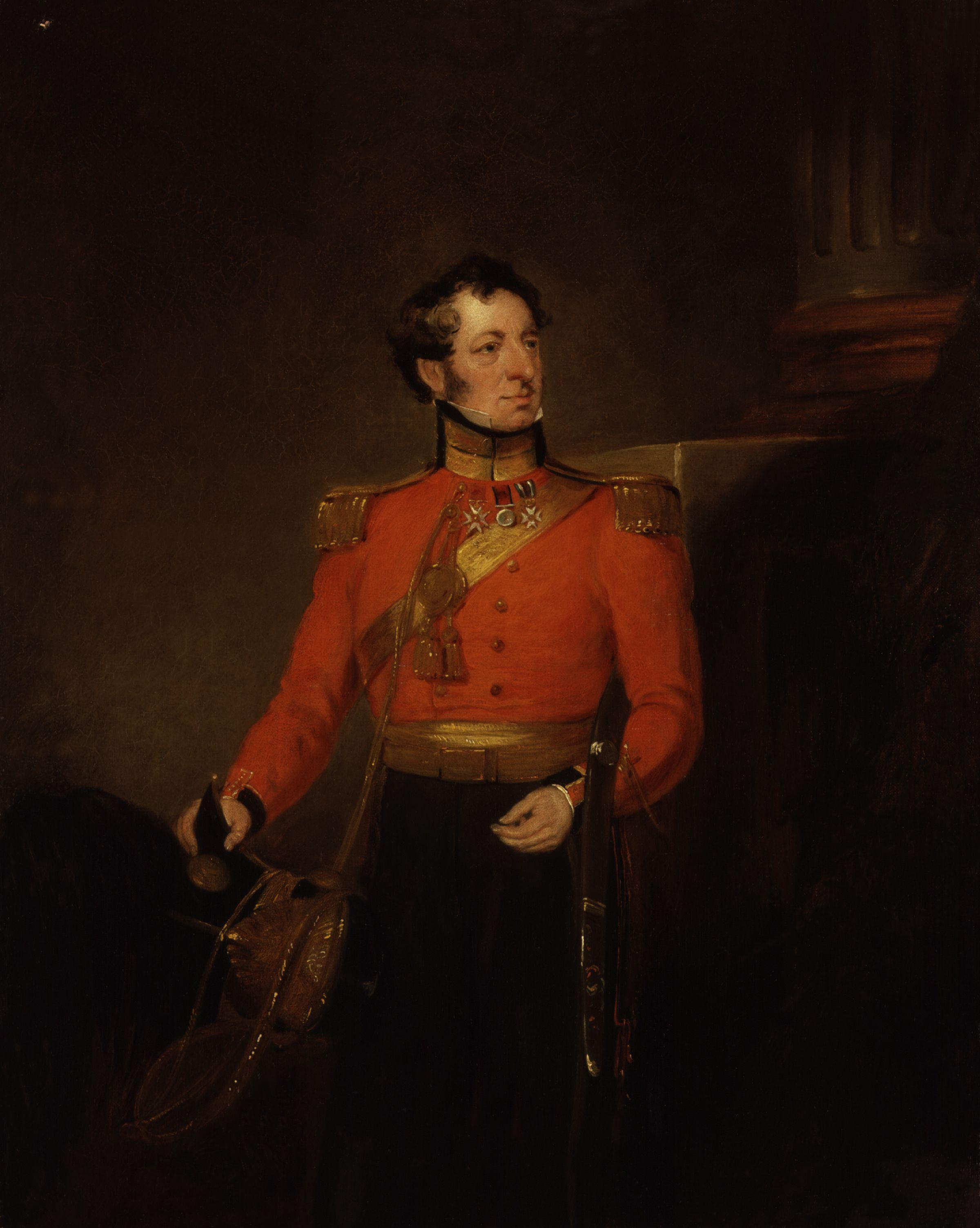
- Portrait by William Salter
- Born: 1775
- Died: 1865 (aged 89–90)
- Allegiance: United Kingdom
- Branch: British Army
- Rank: General
- Conflicts: Napoleonic Wars; Battle of Waterloo

Sir James Wallace Sleigh KCB (1775–1865) was an officer of the British Army. He rose to be a general, and fought with Wellington at the Battle of Waterloo.

== Family background ==
Sleigh was the son of William Sleigh and Frances Wallace. His mother was the illegitimate daughter of Admiral Sir James Wallace. He also had a brother called Francis Wallace Sleigh who went to live in South Africa. In 1783 his father is mentioned in the events surrounding the court case involving Charles Bourne and Sir James Wallace. Along with his mother and siblings he is mentioned as a beneficiary in the will of Sir James Wallace (who died in 1803). Sleigh married Eliza Fagan, the daughter of Major-General Christopher Sullivan Fagan and Agnes Baldock in 1831.

== Military record ==
Sleigh was appointed a lieutenant with the 11th Dragoons in 1795. He was made a captain in 1798 and a major in 1805. In 1809 he became a lieutenant-colonel and as such fought in the Battle of Waterloo against Napoleon. In 1819 he became a colonel by brevet. He was appointed Companion of the Order of the Bath. In 1826 he is referred to as formerly a brigadier and as a British general who was leading the Cavalry in a battle in India at Bhurtpore. He became a major-general in 1830 and was made the Colonel of the 9th Lancers in 1839.
