= Arthur Crosse =

Arthur Bayly Crosse (1831 – 1909) was Archdeacon of Furness from 1882 until 1892.

He was educated at Gonville and Caius College, Cambridge, and ordained in 1854. After curacies in Trimingham and Great Yarmouth he held posts at Kessingland, Biarritz and Barrow-in-Furness before his appointment as Archdeacon; and Norwich afterwards.

He died on 8 June 1909.
