= Herbert Turner (bishop) =

Bishop of Penrith

Herbert Victor Turner (1888 – 10 March 1968) was the second Bishop of Penrith in the modern era.

Educated at Merton College, Oxford, he was successively curate at Sutton in Ashfield, vicar of St. Peter's Church, Nottingham, then St. Mary's Church, Radcliffe on Trent and canon of Southwell before his appointment to the episcopate. He was consecrated a bishop on St James's Day 1944 (25 July), by Cyril Garbett, Archbishop of York, at York Minster. He retired to Windermere after 14 years in post and died a decade later on 10 March 1968.

== Notes ==
Church of England titles
Preceded by Grandage Edwards Powell	Bishop of Penrith; 1944 – 1958	Succeeded by Sydney Cyril Bulley
