= Bishop of Penrith =

Suffragan bishop of the Church of England

The Bishop of Penrith is an episcopal title named after the town of Penrith in Cumbria.

The title was first mentioned "as Pereth" in the Suffragan Bishops Act 1534 (alongside a see for Penreth – now called Penrydd – in Pembrokeshire). It was first used for the Diocese of Ripon in 1888, but the incumbent's episcopal title was transferred to Richmond by Royal Warrant in 1889. Since 1939, the Bishop of Penrith has been a suffragan bishop in the Church of England Diocese of Carlisle assisting the diocesan Bishop of Carlisle in overseeing the diocese.

== List of bishops ==
Bishops of Penrith
From	Until	Incumbent	Notes
1534	1888	in abeyance	Crockfords shows John Bird as Bishop 1537-39 but this is almost certainly incorrect due to the misidentification of his See of Penreth with Penrith. John Byrde was consecrated for Dio.Llandaff (possibly for Skenfrith in Monmouthshire) and in 1539 was translated to Bangor.
1888	1889	John Pulleine	Appointed for the diocese of Ripon. His suffragan title was changed by Royal Warrant to Richmond in 1889.
1889	1939	in abeyance	
1939	1944	Grandage Powell	
1944	1959	Herbert Turner	
1959	1966	Cyril Bulley	Translated to Carlisle
1967	1970	Reginald Foskett	
1970	1979	Edward Pugh	
1979	1994	George Hacker	
1994	2002	Richard Garrard	
2002	2009	James Newcome	Translated to Carlisle on 10 October 2009.
2009	2011	no appointment	
2011	2018	Robert Freeman	Consecrated on 28 October 2011; retired "Easter" 2018.
2019	2021	Emma Ineson	Consecrated on 27 February 2019; resigned See to become "Bishop to the Archbishops of Canterbury and York" on 1 June 2021.
2022	2025	Rob Saner-Haigh	Consecrated 15 July 2022; translated to Carlisle, 1 September 2025.
2026		Michael John Leyden	Consecrated 30 April 2026
