= Diocese of Carlisle =

Diocese of the Church of England

Coordinates: 54.8947°N 2.9385°W

Diocese of Carlisle Dioecesis Carleolensis
- Coat of arms

- Flag

Location
- Ecclesiastical province: Province of York
- Archdeaconries: Carlisle, West Cumberland, Westmorland and Furness

Statistics
- Parishes: 267
- Churches: 349

Information
- Cathedral: Carlisle Cathedral
- Language: English

Current leadership
- Bishop: Robert Saner-Haigh, Bishop of Carlisle
- Suffragan: Michael Leyden Bishop of Penrith
- Archdeacons: Vernon Ross, Archdeacon of Westmorland and Furness; Stewart Fyfe, Archdeacon of West Cumberland; Ruth Newton, Archdeacon of Carlisle

Website
- carlislediocese.org.uk

The Diocese of Carlisle was created in 11 April 1132 by Henry I out of part of the Diocese of Durham, although many people of Cumbric descent in the area looked to Glasgow for spiritual leadership. The first bishop was Æthelwold, who was the king's confessor and became prior of the Augustinian priory at Nostell in Yorkshire. Carlisle was thus the only cathedral in England apart from Bristol to be run by Augustinians instead of Benedictines. This only lasted until the reign of Henry III however, when the Augustinians in Carlisle joined the rebels who temporarily handed the city over to Scotland and elected their own bishop. When the revolt was ended, the Augustinians were expelled.

The seat of the diocese is the Cathedral Church of the Holy and Undivided Trinity in Carlisle.

The Diocese covers most of the ceremonial county of Cumbria; Alston Moor is part of the Diocese of Newcastle. The diocese originally only covered the northern parts of Cumberland and Westmorland, and expanded to cover almost the entirety of these, as well as the Furness and Cartmel areas of Lancashire, in 1847, from part of the Diocese of Chester, although this did not take effect until 1856.

== Organisation ==
=== Bishops ===
Alongside the diocesan Bishop of Carlisle (Rob Saner-Haigh), the Diocese has one suffragan bishop, the Bishop of Penrith (Michael Leyden)

Other retired bishops living in the diocese who are licensed as honorary assistant bishops:

- 2003–present: A retired Bishop suffragan of Bedford, John Richardson, is licensed in both Carlisle and Newcastle dioceses and lives in Bewcastle.
- 2024–present: John Thomson, formerly Bishop of Selby
- James Bell, formerly Bishop of Knaresborough
- Peter Ramsden, formerly bishop of Port Moresby
- Nigel McCulloch, formerly Bishop of Manchester, Bishop of Wakefield and Bishop of Taunton

Alternative episcopal oversight is provided by the provincial episcopal visitor (PEV) the Bishop suffragan of Beverley, Stephen Race, and Bishop of Ebbsfleet, Rob Munro.

=== Archdeaconries and deaneries ===
The diocese of Carlisle is divided into three archdeaconries, each divided into a number of rural deaneries. The data in this table is a summation of the statistics found in the list of churches.

Diocese	Archdeaconries	Rural Deaneries	Paid clergy	Churches	Population	People/clergy	People/church	Churches/clergy
Diocese of Carlisle	Archdeaconry of Carlisle	Rural Deanery of Carlisle	16*	34*	88,404	5,525	2,600	2.13
Diocese of Carlisle	Archdeaconry of Carlisle	Rural Deanery of Appleby	3	33	19,451	6,484	589	11
Diocese of Carlisle	Archdeaconry of Carlisle	Rural Deanery of Brampton	8	29	24,038	3,005	829	3.63
Diocese of Carlisle	Archdeaconry of Carlisle	Rural Deanery of Penrith	9	34	30,003	3,334	882	3.78
Diocese of Carlisle	Archdeaconry of West Cumberland	Rural Deanery of Calder	11	39	58,706	5,337	1,505	3.55
Diocese of Carlisle	Archdeaconry of West Cumberland	Rural Deanery of Derwent	9	35	28,292	3,144	808	3.89
Diocese of Carlisle	Archdeaconry of West Cumberland	Rural Deanery of Solway	10	27	66,803	6,680	2,474	2.7
Diocese of Carlisle	Archdeaconry of Westmorland and Furness	Rural Deanery of Barrow	5	9	55,474	11,095	6,164	1.8
Diocese of Carlisle	Archdeaconry of Westmorland and Furness	Rural Deanery of Furness	8	25	42,866	5,358	1,715	3.13
Diocese of Carlisle	Archdeaconry of Westmorland and Furness	Rural Deanery of Kendal	13	43	56,291	4,330	1,309	3.31
Diocese of Carlisle	Archdeaconry of Westmorland and Furness	Rural Deanery of Windermere	8	26	26,013	3,252	1,001	3.25
Total/average			100	334	496,341	4,963	1,486	3.34

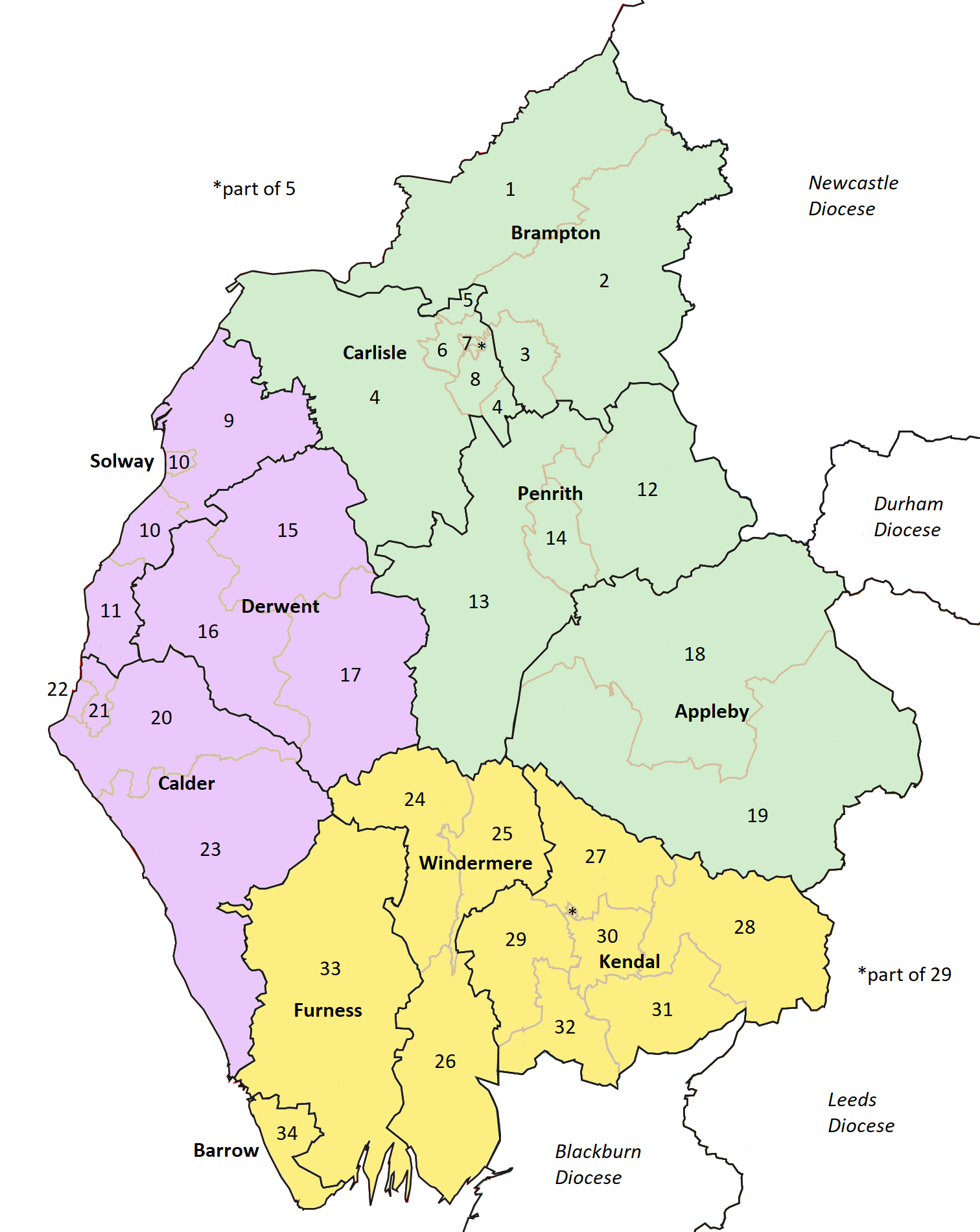
Carlisle deaneries & mission communities, coloured by archdeaconry (yellow = Westmorland & Furness; purple = West Cumberland; green = Carlisle). Mission communities: (1) Brampton North/The Borders (2) Brampton Central (3) Eden Wild Goose (4) Carlisle Rural (5) Carlisle West (6) Two Rivers (7) Heart of the city (8) Carlisle South (9) Solway Plain (10) Criffel View (11) Workington (12) East of Eden (13) Penrith West (14) Penrith Central (15) Binsey (16) Grasmoor (17) Keswick (18) Heart of Westmorland (19) Appleby South (20) Central Calder (21) East Whitehaven (22) Whitehaven (23) South Calder (24) Central Lakes (25) Windermere South Lakes (26) Cartmel Peninsula (27) Beacon (28) Western Dales (29) Two Valleys (30) Kendal Helm (31) Kirkby Lonsdale (32) Kendal Estuary (33) Furness (34) Barrow

*includes Cathedral

From 1889 to 1939, the diocese had one suffragan bishop, the Bishop of Barrow-in-Furness, and from 1939 until 1944, two suffragan bishops (Penrith and Barrow), before the see of Barrow went into the abeyance in which it remains to date.

== Sources ==
- Church of England Statistics 2002
- Diocese of Carlisle
- Carlisle Diocese Youth Centre (St John's-in-the-Vale)
