= List of minor planets: 550001–551000 =

The following is a partial list of minor planets, running from minor-planet number 550001 through 551000, inclusive. The primary data for this and other partial lists is based on JPL's "Small-Body Orbital Elements" and data available from the Minor Planet Center. Critical list information is also provided by the MPC, unless otherwise specified from Lowell Observatory. A detailed description of the table's columns and additional sources are given on the main page including a complete list of every page in this series, and a statistical break-up on the dynamical classification of minor planets.

Also see the summary list of all named bodies in numerical and alphabetical order, and the corresponding naming citations for the number range of this particular list. New namings may only be added to this list after official publication, as the preannouncement of names is condemned by the Working Group for Small Bodies Nomenclature of the International Astronomical Union.

Near-Earth obj.	MBA (inner)	MBA (outer)	Centaur
Mars-crosser	MBA (middle)	Jupiter trojan	Trans-Neptunian obj.
Unclassified

== 550001–550100 ==
Designation			Discovery			Properties		Ref
Permanent	Provisional	Named after	Date	Site	Discoverer(s)	Category	Diam.	Ref
550001	2011 WJ_{138}	—	October 23, 2011	Kitt Peak	Spacewatch	·	3.3 km	MPC · JPL
550002	2011 WY_{140}	—	February 12, 2000	Apache Point	SDSS	·	1.5 km	MPC · JPL
550003	2011 WM_{145}	—	November 20, 2006	Kitt Peak	Spacewatch	·	1.6 km	MPC · JPL
550004	2011 WC_{151}	—	December 1, 2011	Haleakala	Pan-STARRS 1	·	1.2 km	MPC · JPL
550005	2011 WK_{152}	—	December 26, 2003	Piszkéstető	K. Sárneczky	·	1.3 km	MPC · JPL
550006	2011 WY_{158}	—	November 25, 2011	Haleakala	Pan-STARRS 1	·	1.5 km	MPC · JPL
550007	2011 WY_{161}	—	November 23, 2011	Mount Lemmon	Mount Lemmon Survey	·	910 m	MPC · JPL
550008	2011 WF_{162}	—	February 5, 2017	Mount Lemmon	Mount Lemmon Survey	·	1.3 km	MPC · JPL
550009	2011 WH_{162}	—	March 19, 2013	Haleakala	Pan-STARRS 1	PHO	1.1 km	MPC · JPL
550010	2011 WX_{162}	—	November 18, 2011	Mount Lemmon	Mount Lemmon Survey	·	700 m	MPC · JPL
550011	2011 WG_{165}	—	November 26, 2011	Mount Lemmon	Mount Lemmon Survey	·	1.8 km	MPC · JPL
550012	2011 WH_{165}	—	April 9, 2013	Haleakala	Pan-STARRS 1	H	390 m	MPC · JPL
550013	2011 WL_{166}	—	March 19, 2017	Mount Lemmon	Mount Lemmon Survey	·	1.2 km	MPC · JPL
550014	2011 WZ_{166}	—	November 3, 2015	Mount Lemmon	Mount Lemmon Survey	·	1.0 km	MPC · JPL
550015	2011 WZ_{167}	—	November 24, 2011	Mount Lemmon	Mount Lemmon Survey	L4	6.5 km	MPC · JPL
550016	2011 WB_{168}	—	July 4, 2014	Haleakala	Pan-STARRS 1	·	1.3 km	MPC · JPL
550017	2011 WY_{169}	—	November 26, 2011	Mount Lemmon	Mount Lemmon Survey	H	490 m	MPC · JPL
550018	2011 WJ_{171}	—	November 24, 2011	Mount Lemmon	Mount Lemmon Survey	·	1.1 km	MPC · JPL
550019	2011 WV_{172}	—	May 21, 2014	Haleakala	Pan-STARRS 1	·	1.5 km	MPC · JPL
550020	2011 WY_{172}	—	November 7, 2015	Haleakala	Pan-STARRS 1	·	1.2 km	MPC · JPL
550021	2011 WY_{174}	—	November 23, 2011	Mount Lemmon	Mount Lemmon Survey	(5)	710 m	MPC · JPL
550022	2011 WG_{175}	—	November 18, 2011	Mount Lemmon	Mount Lemmon Survey	·	1.5 km	MPC · JPL
550023	2011 WE_{176}	—	August 29, 2006	Kitt Peak	Spacewatch	·	1.5 km	MPC · JPL
550024	2011 WD_{179}	—	November 27, 2011	Mount Lemmon	Mount Lemmon Survey	·	1.3 km	MPC · JPL
550025	2011 XU_{4}	—	October 8, 2015	Haleakala	Pan-STARRS 1	·	1.1 km	MPC · JPL
550026	2011 XO_{5}	—	December 6, 2011	Haleakala	Pan-STARRS 1	·	1.4 km	MPC · JPL
550027	2011 XP_{5}	—	January 31, 2017	Haleakala	Pan-STARRS 1	HNS	960 m	MPC · JPL
550028	2011 XD_{6}	—	December 6, 2011	Haleakala	Pan-STARRS 1	(5)	1.1 km	MPC · JPL
550029	2011 XK_{6}	—	April 12, 2013	Haleakala	Pan-STARRS 1	·	770 m	MPC · JPL
550030	2011 YD_{1}	—	January 31, 2004	Apache Point	SDSS Collaboration	HNS	1.3 km	MPC · JPL
550031	2011 YD_{2}	—	December 5, 2007	Mount Lemmon	Mount Lemmon Survey	·	1.1 km	MPC · JPL
550032	2011 YP_{2}	—	November 30, 2011	Mount Lemmon	Mount Lemmon Survey	·	1.4 km	MPC · JPL
550033	2011 YZ_{3}	—	October 19, 2006	Catalina	CSS	·	2.0 km	MPC · JPL
550034 Reitsam	2011 YA_{4}	Reitsam	December 22, 2011	Oukaïmeden	C. Rinner	·	1.2 km	MPC · JPL
550035	2011 YD_{4}	—	January 28, 2007	Kitt Peak	Spacewatch	·	3.2 km	MPC · JPL
550036	2011 YK_{5}	—	December 24, 2011	Mount Lemmon	Mount Lemmon Survey	·	2.6 km	MPC · JPL
550037	2011 YN_{5}	—	December 24, 2011	Mount Lemmon	Mount Lemmon Survey	·	1.2 km	MPC · JPL
550038	2011 YR_{6}	—	December 17, 2007	Mount Lemmon	Mount Lemmon Survey	·	1.5 km	MPC · JPL
550039	2011 YN_{9}	—	December 6, 2011	Haleakala	Pan-STARRS 1	·	1.1 km	MPC · JPL
550040	2011 YF_{12}	—	January 1, 2008	Kitt Peak	Spacewatch	·	1.1 km	MPC · JPL
550041	2011 YT_{14}	—	December 25, 2011	Les Engarouines	L. Bernasconi	L4	8.4 km	MPC · JPL
550042	2011 YK_{16}	—	November 2, 2007	Mount Lemmon	Mount Lemmon Survey	PHO	1 km	MPC · JPL
550043	2011 YL_{19}	—	December 30, 2008	Kitt Peak	Spacewatch	·	760 m	MPC · JPL
550044	2011 YN_{19}	—	October 15, 2001	Palomar	NEAT	·	2.5 km	MPC · JPL
550045	2011 YA_{21}	—	November 7, 2002	Kitt Peak	Deep Ecliptic Survey	MIS	2.4 km	MPC · JPL
550046	2011 YH_{22}	—	February 28, 2008	Catalina	CSS	·	1.9 km	MPC · JPL
550047	2011 YG_{23}	—	December 22, 1998	Kitt Peak	Spacewatch	·	1.6 km	MPC · JPL
550048	2011 YE_{25}	—	December 31, 2007	Kitt Peak	Spacewatch	·	1.2 km	MPC · JPL
550049	2011 YU_{34}	—	August 7, 2010	XuYi	PMO NEO Survey Program	·	2.1 km	MPC · JPL
550050	2011 YW_{34}	—	September 3, 2010	Mount Lemmon	Mount Lemmon Survey	·	2.7 km	MPC · JPL
550051	2011 YL_{35}	—	October 15, 2002	Palomar	NEAT	(5)	1.2 km	MPC · JPL
550052	2011 YV_{35}	—	September 14, 2006	Kitt Peak	Spacewatch	·	1.3 km	MPC · JPL
550053	2011 YM_{36}	—	January 14, 2008	Kitt Peak	Spacewatch	·	950 m	MPC · JPL
550054	2011 YC_{42}	—	December 25, 2011	Mount Lemmon	Mount Lemmon Survey	·	1.1 km	MPC · JPL
550055	2011 YS_{45}	—	December 27, 2011	Kitt Peak	Spacewatch	EUN	1.2 km	MPC · JPL
550056	2011 YH_{48}	—	January 17, 2004	Palomar	NEAT	·	1.5 km	MPC · JPL
550057	2011 YG_{53}	—	December 19, 2007	Mount Lemmon	Mount Lemmon Survey	·	1.8 km	MPC · JPL
550058	2011 YT_{53}	—	December 27, 2011	Mount Lemmon	Mount Lemmon Survey	·	1.0 km	MPC · JPL
550059	2011 YH_{57}	—	August 31, 2005	Campo Imperatore	CINEOS	615	1.5 km	MPC · JPL
550060	2011 YW_{58}	—	December 29, 2011	Kitt Peak	Spacewatch	·	1.6 km	MPC · JPL
550061	2011 YL_{60}	—	December 29, 2011	Kitt Peak	Spacewatch	ADE	1.5 km	MPC · JPL
550062	2011 YQ_{63}	—	December 26, 2011	Marly	P. Kocher	·	1.6 km	MPC · JPL
550063	2011 YJ_{66}	—	December 31, 2011	Kitt Peak	Spacewatch	·	1.8 km	MPC · JPL
550064	2011 YD_{68}	—	December 31, 2011	Kitt Peak	Spacewatch	L4	9.5 km	MPC · JPL
550065	2011 YE_{68}	—	March 9, 2008	Kitt Peak	Spacewatch	·	1.3 km	MPC · JPL
550066	2011 YF_{68}	—	August 29, 2006	Catalina	CSS	·	1.4 km	MPC · JPL
550067	2011 YT_{68}	—	December 17, 2011	ESA OGS	ESA OGS	·	1.1 km	MPC · JPL
550068	2011 YL_{73}	—	December 30, 2011	Kitt Peak	Spacewatch	·	1.6 km	MPC · JPL
550069	2011 YY_{74}	—	February 18, 2001	Haleakala	NEAT	·	3.7 km	MPC · JPL
550070	2011 YA_{75}	—	October 9, 2002	Socorro	LINEAR	·	1.6 km	MPC · JPL
550071	2011 YM_{76}	—	December 18, 2003	Socorro	LINEAR	·	1.2 km	MPC · JPL
550072	2011 YL_{78}	—	January 24, 2012	Haleakala	Pan-STARRS 1	·	1.7 km	MPC · JPL
550073	2011 YY_{79}	—	March 8, 2008	Mount Lemmon	Mount Lemmon Survey	·	910 m	MPC · JPL
550074	2011 YZ_{79}	—	December 27, 2011	Kitt Peak	Spacewatch	·	1.4 km	MPC · JPL
550075	2011 YC_{80}	—	December 27, 2011	Mount Lemmon	Mount Lemmon Survey	EUN	860 m	MPC · JPL
550076	2011 YK_{81}	—	December 28, 2011	Mount Lemmon	Mount Lemmon Survey	·	720 m	MPC · JPL
550077	2011 YP_{82}	—	December 27, 2011	Mount Lemmon	Mount Lemmon Survey	·	3.0 km	MPC · JPL
550078	2011 YH_{83}	—	September 13, 2015	Piszkéstető	K. Sárneczky	·	1.4 km	MPC · JPL
550079	2011 YL_{83}	—	December 27, 2011	Kitt Peak	Spacewatch	HNS	960 m	MPC · JPL
550080	2011 YE_{84}	—	November 19, 2015	Mount Lemmon	Mount Lemmon Survey	·	1.5 km	MPC · JPL
550081	2011 YW_{84}	—	April 12, 2013	Haleakala	Pan-STARRS 1	·	1.4 km	MPC · JPL
550082	2011 YY_{84}	—	December 27, 2011	Mount Lemmon	Mount Lemmon Survey	·	1.9 km	MPC · JPL
550083 Szécsényi-Nagy	2011 YL_{85}	Szécsényi-Nagy	December 31, 2011	Piszkéstető	K. Sárneczky, A. Szing	EUN	1.1 km	MPC · JPL
550084	2011 YQ_{85}	—	December 31, 2011	Kitt Peak	Spacewatch	EUN	830 m	MPC · JPL
550085	2011 YR_{85}	—	December 31, 2011	Mount Lemmon	Mount Lemmon Survey	·	1.1 km	MPC · JPL
550086	2011 YX_{85}	—	April 1, 1995	Kitt Peak	Spacewatch	·	1.9 km	MPC · JPL
550087	2011 YT_{88}	—	October 13, 1998	Kitt Peak	Spacewatch	EUN	1.2 km	MPC · JPL
550088	2011 YJ_{89}	—	December 29, 2011	Mount Lemmon	Mount Lemmon Survey	L4	7.2 km	MPC · JPL
550089	2011 YC_{91}	—	December 29, 2011	Mount Lemmon	Mount Lemmon Survey	·	1.1 km	MPC · JPL
550090	2012 AC_{1}	—	March 1, 2008	Kitt Peak	Spacewatch	BAR	960 m	MPC · JPL
550091	2012 AL_{2}	—	October 2, 2006	Mount Lemmon	Mount Lemmon Survey	·	1.8 km	MPC · JPL
550092	2012 AV_{3}	—	January 1, 2012	Mount Lemmon	Mount Lemmon Survey	·	1.1 km	MPC · JPL
550093	2012 AW_{4}	—	January 10, 2007	Kitt Peak	Spacewatch	·	2.7 km	MPC · JPL
550094	2012 AJ_{10}	—	August 28, 2005	Siding Spring	SSS	H	650 m	MPC · JPL
550095	2012 AV_{11}	—	February 13, 2004	Kitt Peak	Spacewatch	ADE	1.5 km	MPC · JPL
550096	2012 AL_{18}	—	October 5, 2002	Palomar	NEAT	·	1.1 km	MPC · JPL
550097	2012 AX_{18}	—	October 31, 2002	Socorro	LINEAR	·	1.9 km	MPC · JPL
550098	2012 AQ_{21}	—	December 29, 2011	Mount Lemmon	Mount Lemmon Survey	JUN	910 m	MPC · JPL
550099	2012 AN_{22}	—	November 24, 2011	Haleakala	Pan-STARRS 1	·	1.2 km	MPC · JPL
550100	2012 AB_{23}	—	December 30, 2007	Kitt Peak	Spacewatch	·	1.1 km	MPC · JPL

== 550101–550200 ==
back to top

Designation			Discovery			Properties		Ref
Permanent	Provisional	Named after	Date	Site	Discoverer(s)	Category	Diam.	Ref
550101	2012 AB_{25}	—	January 6, 2012	Kitt Peak	Spacewatch	·	1.0 km	MPC · JPL
550102	2012 AL_{25}	—	January 4, 2012	Mount Lemmon	Mount Lemmon Survey	·	540 m	MPC · JPL
550103	2012 AU_{26}	—	January 10, 2012	Mount Lemmon	Mount Lemmon Survey	HNS	1.3 km	MPC · JPL
550104	2012 AW_{28}	—	January 1, 2012	Mount Lemmon	Mount Lemmon Survey	·	1.1 km	MPC · JPL
550105	2012 AX_{29}	—	January 21, 1999	Caussols	ODAS	·	1.6 km	MPC · JPL
550106	2012 AH_{30}	—	January 2, 2012	Kitt Peak	Spacewatch	L4	8.0 km	MPC · JPL
550107	2012 AZ_{30}	—	January 2, 2012	Mount Lemmon	Mount Lemmon Survey	EOS	1.8 km	MPC · JPL
550108	2012 AA_{32}	—	January 1, 2012	Mount Lemmon	Mount Lemmon Survey	·	970 m	MPC · JPL
550109	2012 AV_{32}	—	January 3, 2012	Mount Lemmon	Mount Lemmon Survey	·	2.7 km	MPC · JPL
550110	2012 AL_{33}	—	January 4, 2012	Mount Lemmon	Mount Lemmon Survey	GAL	1.2 km	MPC · JPL
550111	2012 BW_{2}	—	December 29, 2011	Kitt Peak	Spacewatch	·	1.5 km	MPC · JPL
550112	2012 BX_{2}	—	December 25, 2011	Kitt Peak	Spacewatch	EUN	950 m	MPC · JPL
550113	2012 BH_{3}	—	December 26, 2011	Kitt Peak	Spacewatch	·	1.7 km	MPC · JPL
550114	2012 BQ_{3}	—	January 2, 2012	Mount Lemmon	Mount Lemmon Survey	EUN	810 m	MPC · JPL
550115	2012 BK_{4}	—	October 20, 2006	Kitt Peak	Spacewatch	·	1.2 km	MPC · JPL
550116	2012 BC_{9}	—	January 18, 2012	Kitt Peak	Spacewatch	·	1.3 km	MPC · JPL
550117	2012 BD_{10}	—	September 11, 2007	Mount Lemmon	Mount Lemmon Survey	·	630 m	MPC · JPL
550118	2012 BJ_{10}	—	July 30, 2000	Cerro Tololo	Deep Ecliptic Survey	·	2.4 km	MPC · JPL
550119	2012 BO_{16}	—	April 7, 2008	Kitt Peak	Spacewatch	·	2.4 km	MPC · JPL
550120	2012 BZ_{17}	—	February 22, 2003	Palomar	NEAT	·	2.1 km	MPC · JPL
550121	2012 BQ_{19}	—	December 29, 2011	Mount Lemmon	Mount Lemmon Survey	JUN	820 m	MPC · JPL
550122	2012 BL_{21}	—	December 26, 2011	Kitt Peak	Spacewatch	H	460 m	MPC · JPL
550123	2012 BE_{23}	—	October 5, 2002	Palomar	NEAT	EUN	1.4 km	MPC · JPL
550124	2012 BY_{26}	—	February 10, 2008	Mount Lemmon	Mount Lemmon Survey	·	1.5 km	MPC · JPL
550125	2012 BA_{28}	—	January 19, 2012	Haleakala	Pan-STARRS 1	HNS	1.0 km	MPC · JPL
550126	2012 BT_{29}	—	February 16, 2004	Kitt Peak	Spacewatch	RAF	1.0 km	MPC · JPL
550127	2012 BA_{31}	—	August 23, 2004	Kitt Peak	Spacewatch	·	2.8 km	MPC · JPL
550128	2012 BT_{32}	—	January 3, 2012	Kitt Peak	Spacewatch	·	2.6 km	MPC · JPL
550129	2012 BN_{37}	—	February 19, 2001	Socorro	LINEAR	·	4.2 km	MPC · JPL
550130	2012 BP_{37}	—	November 2, 2006	Mount Lemmon	Mount Lemmon Survey	·	1.8 km	MPC · JPL
550131	2012 BG_{40}	—	November 4, 2010	Mount Lemmon	Mount Lemmon Survey	EOS	1.5 km	MPC · JPL
550132	2012 BH_{40}	—	January 19, 2012	Mount Lemmon	Mount Lemmon Survey	·	2.7 km	MPC · JPL
550133	2012 BL_{40}	—	September 15, 2010	Mount Lemmon	Mount Lemmon Survey	·	640 m	MPC · JPL
550134	2012 BX_{40}	—	January 19, 2012	Mount Lemmon	Mount Lemmon Survey	·	2.7 km	MPC · JPL
550135	2012 BV_{43}	—	December 30, 2011	Kitt Peak	Spacewatch	·	1.6 km	MPC · JPL
550136	2012 BD_{44}	—	January 10, 2008	Mount Lemmon	Mount Lemmon Survey	·	1.2 km	MPC · JPL
550137	2012 BP_{46}	—	January 19, 2012	Mount Lemmon	Mount Lemmon Survey	3:2 · SHU	5.0 km	MPC · JPL
550138	2012 BN_{48}	—	July 7, 2005	Mauna Kea	Veillet, C.	·	1.2 km	MPC · JPL
550139 Venn	2012 BF_{53}	Venn	September 18, 2006	Mauna Kea	D. D. Balam	·	1.2 km	MPC · JPL
550140	2012 BD_{54}	—	February 21, 2003	Palomar	NEAT	·	2.1 km	MPC · JPL
550141	2012 BF_{54}	—	December 26, 2006	Catalina	CSS	·	2.4 km	MPC · JPL
550142	2012 BA_{55}	—	January 21, 2012	Haleakala	Pan-STARRS 1	·	2.1 km	MPC · JPL
550143	2012 BT_{55}	—	January 21, 2012	Haleakala	Pan-STARRS 1	·	1.7 km	MPC · JPL
550144	2012 BP_{56}	—	February 18, 2008	Mount Lemmon	Mount Lemmon Survey	·	1.1 km	MPC · JPL
550145	2012 BE_{58}	—	January 18, 2012	Mount Lemmon	Mount Lemmon Survey	·	2.3 km	MPC · JPL
550146	2012 BQ_{59}	—	January 19, 2012	Mount Lemmon	Mount Lemmon Survey	·	1.3 km	MPC · JPL
550147	2012 BU_{59}	—	December 7, 2005	Kitt Peak	Spacewatch	EOS	1.9 km	MPC · JPL
550148	2012 BN_{62}	—	December 29, 2011	Kitt Peak	Spacewatch	·	2.6 km	MPC · JPL
550149	2012 BS_{67}	—	November 2, 2011	Mount Lemmon	Mount Lemmon Survey	·	1.9 km	MPC · JPL
550150	2012 BB_{74}	—	October 8, 2004	Kitt Peak	Spacewatch	·	700 m	MPC · JPL
550151	2012 BM_{78}	—	January 30, 2003	Haleakala	NEAT	·	1.9 km	MPC · JPL
550152	2012 BR_{78}	—	September 28, 2006	Catalina	CSS	·	1.6 km	MPC · JPL
550153	2012 BD_{79}	—	January 4, 2012	Kitt Peak	Spacewatch	·	1.5 km	MPC · JPL
550154	2012 BM_{82}	—	May 3, 2005	Kitt Peak	Spacewatch	·	1.0 km	MPC · JPL
550155	2012 BW_{86}	—	March 29, 2008	Catalina	CSS	·	1.4 km	MPC · JPL
550156	2012 BB_{87}	—	September 30, 2006	Mount Lemmon	Mount Lemmon Survey	·	2.5 km	MPC · JPL
550157	2012 BE_{87}	—	December 19, 2011	Oukaïmeden	M. Ory	·	3.8 km	MPC · JPL
550158	2012 BJ_{88}	—	January 26, 2012	Kitt Peak	Spacewatch	·	1.2 km	MPC · JPL
550159	2012 BX_{88}	—	January 14, 2012	Kitt Peak	Spacewatch	·	1.1 km	MPC · JPL
550160	2012 BS_{90}	—	November 14, 2007	Kitt Peak	Spacewatch	·	830 m	MPC · JPL
550161	2012 BC_{91}	—	January 26, 2012	Mount Lemmon	Mount Lemmon Survey	·	1.3 km	MPC · JPL
550162	2012 BL_{95}	—	February 7, 2002	Palomar	NEAT	·	2.3 km	MPC · JPL
550163	2012 BY_{95}	—	November 28, 2011	Mount Lemmon	Mount Lemmon Survey	·	3.3 km	MPC · JPL
550164	2012 BO_{98}	—	December 24, 2011	Mount Lemmon	Mount Lemmon Survey	ADE	1.7 km	MPC · JPL
550165	2012 BY_{99}	—	March 8, 2003	Nogales	P. R. Holvorcem, M. Schwartz	·	1.5 km	MPC · JPL
550166	2012 BG_{101}	—	January 27, 2012	Kitt Peak	Spacewatch	·	1.2 km	MPC · JPL
550167	2012 BY_{102}	—	December 18, 2011	Les Engarouines	L. Bernasconi	·	1.4 km	MPC · JPL
550168	2012 BU_{109}	—	January 18, 2012	Kitt Peak	Spacewatch	·	1.2 km	MPC · JPL
550169	2012 BO_{110}	—	December 28, 2011	Mount Lemmon	Mount Lemmon Survey	·	1.6 km	MPC · JPL
550170	2012 BM_{114}	—	January 27, 2012	Mount Lemmon	Mount Lemmon Survey	·	1.8 km	MPC · JPL
550171	2012 BP_{115}	—	February 7, 2008	Kitt Peak	Spacewatch	·	1.5 km	MPC · JPL
550172	2012 BD_{119}	—	December 30, 2011	Kitt Peak	Spacewatch	·	2.0 km	MPC · JPL
550173	2012 BH_{119}	—	January 27, 2012	Mount Lemmon	Mount Lemmon Survey	·	600 m	MPC · JPL
550174	2012 BZ_{121}	—	February 8, 2008	Kitt Peak	Spacewatch	·	1.1 km	MPC · JPL
550175	2012 BU_{123}	—	June 14, 2010	Mount Lemmon	Mount Lemmon Survey	H	440 m	MPC · JPL
550176	2012 BV_{124}	—	October 9, 2010	Catalina	CSS	·	3.2 km	MPC · JPL
550177	2012 BG_{126}	—	November 22, 2011	Mount Lemmon	Mount Lemmon Survey	·	4.3 km	MPC · JPL
550178	2012 BS_{127}	—	January 20, 2012	Haleakala	Pan-STARRS 1	JUN	890 m	MPC · JPL
550179	2012 BL_{132}	—	April 12, 2008	Catalina	CSS	·	1.7 km	MPC · JPL
550180	2012 BR_{132}	—	January 25, 2012	Haleakala	Pan-STARRS 1	EUN	1.3 km	MPC · JPL
550181	2012 BX_{132}	—	November 4, 2002	Palomar	NEAT	·	1.4 km	MPC · JPL
550182	2012 BD_{133}	—	January 29, 2012	Mount Lemmon	Mount Lemmon Survey	·	2.1 km	MPC · JPL
550183	2012 BT_{134}	—	January 20, 2012	Catalina	CSS	EUN	1.4 km	MPC · JPL
550184	2012 BA_{136}	—	December 31, 2007	Mount Lemmon	Mount Lemmon Survey	·	1.9 km	MPC · JPL
550185	2012 BZ_{136}	—	January 26, 2012	Mount Lemmon	Mount Lemmon Survey	·	1.1 km	MPC · JPL
550186	2012 BL_{139}	—	January 29, 2012	Kitt Peak	Spacewatch	·	1.7 km	MPC · JPL
550187	2012 BK_{143}	—	September 18, 2006	Kitt Peak	Spacewatch	ADE	1.4 km	MPC · JPL
550188	2012 BU_{143}	—	April 5, 2003	Kitt Peak	Spacewatch	·	1.9 km	MPC · JPL
550189	2012 BP_{147}	—	January 28, 2003	Apache Point	SDSS Collaboration	·	1.8 km	MPC · JPL
550190	2012 BR_{147}	—	March 8, 2008	Kitt Peak	Spacewatch	·	1.1 km	MPC · JPL
550191	2012 BO_{149}	—	January 30, 2012	Mount Lemmon	Mount Lemmon Survey	·	1.6 km	MPC · JPL
550192	2012 BS_{149}	—	September 16, 2010	Kitt Peak	Spacewatch	·	1.6 km	MPC · JPL
550193	2012 BX_{149}	—	January 30, 2012	Kitt Peak	Spacewatch	·	2.1 km	MPC · JPL
550194	2012 BV_{151}	—	January 30, 2012	Kitt Peak	Spacewatch	·	2.0 km	MPC · JPL
550195	2012 BK_{156}	—	January 30, 2012	Kitt Peak	Spacewatch	AEO	1.0 km	MPC · JPL
550196	2012 BK_{159}	—	January 30, 2012	Mount Lemmon	Mount Lemmon Survey	JUN	1.0 km	MPC · JPL
550197	2012 BP_{160}	—	January 21, 2012	Kitt Peak	Spacewatch	·	1.8 km	MPC · JPL
550198	2012 BA_{162}	—	January 20, 2012	Mount Lemmon	Mount Lemmon Survey	·	1.4 km	MPC · JPL
550199	2012 BE_{162}	—	January 21, 2012	Kitt Peak	Spacewatch	EUN	1.0 km	MPC · JPL
550200	2012 BT_{162}	—	December 13, 2015	Haleakala	Pan-STARRS 1	·	1.5 km	MPC · JPL

== 550201–550300 ==
back to top

Designation			Discovery			Properties		Ref
Permanent	Provisional	Named after	Date	Site	Discoverer(s)	Category	Diam.	Ref
550201	2012 BF_{163}	—	January 19, 2012	Haleakala	Pan-STARRS 1	·	1.1 km	MPC · JPL
550202	2012 BO_{163}	—	November 17, 2014	Haleakala	Pan-STARRS 1	·	430 m	MPC · JPL
550203	2012 BS_{163}	—	January 29, 2012	Mount Lemmon	Mount Lemmon Survey	HNS	1.2 km	MPC · JPL
550204	2012 BC_{165}	—	December 9, 2015	Haleakala	Pan-STARRS 1	·	1.0 km	MPC · JPL
550205	2012 BU_{166}	—	January 15, 2018	Haleakala	Pan-STARRS 1	·	2.4 km	MPC · JPL
550206	2012 BZ_{166}	—	January 21, 2012	Catalina	CSS	·	1.3 km	MPC · JPL
550207	2012 BA_{167}	—	June 28, 2014	Haleakala	Pan-STARRS 1	·	1.6 km	MPC · JPL
550208	2012 BB_{167}	—	January 19, 2012	Kitt Peak	Spacewatch	·	1.6 km	MPC · JPL
550209	2012 BW_{167}	—	January 19, 2012	Haleakala	Pan-STARRS 1	HNS	750 m	MPC · JPL
550210	2012 BX_{167}	—	January 25, 2012	Kitt Peak	Spacewatch	·	1.8 km	MPC · JPL
550211	2012 BC_{168}	—	January 24, 2012	Haleakala	Pan-STARRS 1	·	1.4 km	MPC · JPL
550212	2012 BM_{169}	—	January 26, 2012	Mount Lemmon	Mount Lemmon Survey	·	2.1 km	MPC · JPL
550213	2012 BG_{172}	—	March 15, 2016	Haleakala	Pan-STARRS 1	·	600 m	MPC · JPL
550214	2012 BT_{173}	—	January 30, 2012	Kitt Peak	Spacewatch	·	1.2 km	MPC · JPL
550215	2012 BR_{174}	—	January 18, 2012	Mount Lemmon	Mount Lemmon Survey	·	530 m	MPC · JPL
550216	2012 BY_{174}	—	January 19, 2012	Haleakala	Pan-STARRS 1	·	1.4 km	MPC · JPL
550217	2012 BD_{176}	—	January 18, 2012	Mount Lemmon	Mount Lemmon Survey	MAR	860 m	MPC · JPL
550218	2012 BN_{176}	—	January 19, 2012	Kitt Peak	Spacewatch	ELF	3.0 km	MPC · JPL
550219	2012 BE_{179}	—	January 21, 2012	Kitt Peak	Spacewatch	·	1.2 km	MPC · JPL
550220	2012 CJ_{3}	—	November 5, 2010	Mount Lemmon	Mount Lemmon Survey	·	2.0 km	MPC · JPL
550221	2012 CK_{5}	—	August 27, 2009	Kitt Peak	Spacewatch	·	2.2 km	MPC · JPL
550222	2012 CL_{6}	—	April 7, 2008	Catalina	CSS	·	2.1 km	MPC · JPL
550223	2012 CY_{7}	—	March 10, 2003	Kitt Peak	Spacewatch	·	1.3 km	MPC · JPL
550224	2012 CQ_{10}	—	September 30, 2010	Mount Lemmon	Mount Lemmon Survey	MRX	840 m	MPC · JPL
550225	2012 CA_{13}	—	October 10, 2006	Palomar	NEAT	EUN	1.3 km	MPC · JPL
550226	2012 CF_{15}	—	December 26, 2011	Mount Lemmon	Mount Lemmon Survey	·	2.0 km	MPC · JPL
550227	2012 CL_{16}	—	April 16, 2004	Palomar	NEAT	·	1.7 km	MPC · JPL
550228	2012 CK_{19}	—	January 19, 2012	Haleakala	Pan-STARRS 1	·	1.4 km	MPC · JPL
550229	2012 CE_{21}	—	March 8, 2005	Mount Lemmon	Mount Lemmon Survey	3:2	4.3 km	MPC · JPL
550230	2012 CA_{23}	—	February 12, 2004	Palomar	NEAT	·	1.4 km	MPC · JPL
550231	2012 CD_{23}	—	August 31, 2005	Kitt Peak	Spacewatch	·	1.8 km	MPC · JPL
550232	2012 CR_{26}	—	January 26, 2012	Mount Lemmon	Mount Lemmon Survey	·	1.1 km	MPC · JPL
550233	2012 CE_{27}	—	November 19, 2006	Catalina	CSS	DOR	1.7 km	MPC · JPL
550234	2012 CN_{27}	—	February 12, 2012	Mount Lemmon	Mount Lemmon Survey	·	1.4 km	MPC · JPL
550235	2012 CN_{28}	—	October 29, 2010	Mount Lemmon	Mount Lemmon Survey	·	1.7 km	MPC · JPL
550236	2012 CU_{28}	—	November 24, 2006	Mount Lemmon	Mount Lemmon Survey	·	1.1 km	MPC · JPL
550237	2012 CW_{30}	—	February 12, 2012	Mount Lemmon	Mount Lemmon Survey	526	2.3 km	MPC · JPL
550238	2012 CY_{30}	—	January 21, 2012	Catalina	CSS	·	1.6 km	MPC · JPL
550239	2012 CQ_{32}	—	February 14, 2012	Haleakala	Pan-STARRS 1	CLO	1.4 km	MPC · JPL
550240	2012 CA_{33}	—	November 22, 2011	Mount Lemmon	Mount Lemmon Survey	·	1.4 km	MPC · JPL
550241	2012 CD_{34}	—	November 1, 2010	Mount Lemmon	Mount Lemmon Survey	·	2.2 km	MPC · JPL
550242	2012 CU_{34}	—	January 18, 2012	Kitt Peak	Spacewatch	·	1.3 km	MPC · JPL
550243	2012 CA_{35}	—	October 19, 2006	Kitt Peak	Deep Ecliptic Survey	·	1.0 km	MPC · JPL
550244	2012 CW_{40}	—	January 19, 2012	Haleakala	Pan-STARRS 1	·	1.9 km	MPC · JPL
550245	2012 CE_{41}	—	February 3, 2012	Haleakala	Pan-STARRS 1	·	1.6 km	MPC · JPL
550246	2012 CY_{41}	—	January 27, 2012	Kitt Peak	Spacewatch	·	1.5 km	MPC · JPL
550247	2012 CY_{42}	—	January 19, 2012	Haleakala	Pan-STARRS 1	·	1.3 km	MPC · JPL
550248	2012 CD_{44}	—	January 19, 2012	Kitt Peak	Spacewatch	H	470 m	MPC · JPL
550249	2012 CZ_{45}	—	August 8, 2005	Cerro Tololo	Deep Ecliptic Survey	·	1.6 km	MPC · JPL
550250	2012 CJ_{52}	—	January 1, 2012	Mount Lemmon	Mount Lemmon Survey	EUN	1.0 km	MPC · JPL
550251	2012 CJ_{53}	—	January 21, 2012	Kitt Peak	Spacewatch	EOS	1.5 km	MPC · JPL
550252	2012 CT_{53}	—	February 15, 2012	Haleakala	Pan-STARRS 1	·	1.6 km	MPC · JPL
550253	2012 CH_{54}	—	February 15, 2012	Haleakala	Pan-STARRS 1	·	2.1 km	MPC · JPL
550254	2012 CE_{56}	—	April 7, 2007	Mount Lemmon	Mount Lemmon Survey	T_{j} (2.95)	4.0 km	MPC · JPL
550255	2012 CM_{56}	—	January 19, 2012	Haleakala	Pan-STARRS 1	·	1.4 km	MPC · JPL
550256	2012 CN_{59}	—	February 14, 2012	Haleakala	Pan-STARRS 1	WIT	790 m	MPC · JPL
550257	2012 CW_{59}	—	February 3, 2012	Haleakala	Pan-STARRS 1	·	1.5 km	MPC · JPL
550258	2012 CB_{60}	—	February 15, 2012	Haleakala	Pan-STARRS 1	MAR	980 m	MPC · JPL
550259	2012 CC_{60}	—	December 26, 2014	Haleakala	Pan-STARRS 1	·	660 m	MPC · JPL
550260	2012 CL_{60}	—	May 3, 2008	Mount Lemmon	Mount Lemmon Survey	·	2.7 km	MPC · JPL
550261	2012 CG_{63}	—	February 14, 2012	Haleakala	Pan-STARRS 1	·	1.5 km	MPC · JPL
550262	2012 CO_{63}	—	March 5, 2017	Haleakala	Pan-STARRS 1	·	1.6 km	MPC · JPL
550263	2012 CO_{68}	—	February 3, 2012	Haleakala	Pan-STARRS 1	AGN	900 m	MPC · JPL
550264	2012 DG_{1}	—	March 31, 2003	Kitt Peak	Spacewatch	·	1.8 km	MPC · JPL
550265	2012 DA_{2}	—	September 29, 2005	Kitt Peak	Spacewatch	·	1.6 km	MPC · JPL
550266	2012 DF_{2}	—	December 1, 2010	Mount Lemmon	Mount Lemmon Survey	·	1.4 km	MPC · JPL
550267	2012 DO_{3}	—	August 16, 2009	Kitt Peak	Spacewatch	·	2.0 km	MPC · JPL
550268	2012 DR_{3}	—	February 16, 2012	Haleakala	Pan-STARRS 1	HNS	1.0 km	MPC · JPL
550269	2012 DD_{4}	—	March 8, 2003	Anderson Mesa	LONEOS	·	2.5 km	MPC · JPL
550270	2012 DU_{7}	—	March 10, 2003	Kitt Peak	Spacewatch	·	1.4 km	MPC · JPL
550271	2012 DP_{8}	—	February 20, 2012	Haleakala	Pan-STARRS 1	AMO	390 m	MPC · JPL
550272	2012 DM_{9}	—	September 14, 2005	Kitt Peak	Spacewatch	AGN	1.0 km	MPC · JPL
550273	2012 DY_{12}	—	November 2, 2011	Mount Lemmon	Mount Lemmon Survey	·	2.0 km	MPC · JPL
550274	2012 DC_{14}	—	January 3, 2012	Kitt Peak	Spacewatch	JUN	810 m	MPC · JPL
550275	2012 DG_{14}	—	November 5, 2010	Mount Lemmon	Mount Lemmon Survey	·	1.8 km	MPC · JPL
550276	2012 DG_{15}	—	January 17, 2007	Catalina	CSS	·	2.0 km	MPC · JPL
550277	2012 DB_{17}	—	February 22, 2012	Kitt Peak	Spacewatch	·	1.6 km	MPC · JPL
550278	2012 DF_{19}	—	October 31, 2010	Mount Lemmon	Mount Lemmon Survey	·	1.6 km	MPC · JPL
550279	2012 DV_{20}	—	August 27, 2005	Palomar	NEAT	·	2.2 km	MPC · JPL
550280	2012 DH_{21}	—	January 10, 2007	Kitt Peak	Spacewatch	·	1.6 km	MPC · JPL
550281	2012 DM_{22}	—	May 5, 2008	Catalina	CSS	·	2.3 km	MPC · JPL
550282	2012 DF_{25}	—	April 1, 2003	Apache Point	SDSS Collaboration	·	1.6 km	MPC · JPL
550283	2012 DW_{26}	—	December 30, 2011	Kitt Peak	Spacewatch	·	2.7 km	MPC · JPL
550284	2012 DG_{27}	—	August 7, 2004	Palomar	NEAT	·	1.7 km	MPC · JPL
550285	2012 DR_{28}	—	October 1, 2005	Mount Lemmon	Mount Lemmon Survey	·	1.6 km	MPC · JPL
550286	2012 DA_{30}	—	February 9, 2007	Kitt Peak	Spacewatch	(18466)	2.2 km	MPC · JPL
550287	2012 DS_{34}	—	August 31, 2005	Palomar	NEAT	·	1.9 km	MPC · JPL
550288	2012 DW_{37}	—	February 25, 2003	Campo Imperatore	CINEOS	·	1.8 km	MPC · JPL
550289	2012 DS_{40}	—	December 28, 2011	Mount Lemmon	Mount Lemmon Survey	·	1.9 km	MPC · JPL
550290	2012 DH_{46}	—	October 15, 2001	Palomar	NEAT	·	1.8 km	MPC · JPL
550291	2012 DH_{48}	—	February 23, 2012	Mount Lemmon	Mount Lemmon Survey	·	1.5 km	MPC · JPL
550292	2012 DQ_{50}	—	February 26, 2012	Mount Lemmon	Mount Lemmon Survey	·	1.6 km	MPC · JPL
550293	2012 DV_{55}	—	February 24, 2012	Haleakala	Pan-STARRS 1	·	810 m	MPC · JPL
550294	2012 DQ_{56}	—	February 1, 2012	Kitt Peak	Spacewatch	·	1.5 km	MPC · JPL
550295	2012 DZ_{62}	—	January 18, 2012	Kitt Peak	Spacewatch	·	1.1 km	MPC · JPL
550296	2012 DP_{64}	—	April 1, 2008	Mount Lemmon	Mount Lemmon Survey	·	1.5 km	MPC · JPL
550297	2012 DL_{66}	—	February 9, 2005	Anderson Mesa	LONEOS	·	710 m	MPC · JPL
550298	2012 DK_{67}	—	April 16, 2005	Vail-Jarnac	Jarnac	·	880 m	MPC · JPL
550299	2012 DU_{70}	—	September 19, 2010	Kitt Peak	Spacewatch	·	1.6 km	MPC · JPL
550300	2012 DR_{71}	—	January 19, 2012	Haleakala	Pan-STARRS 1	·	1.4 km	MPC · JPL

== 550301–550400 ==
back to top

Designation			Discovery			Properties		Ref
Permanent	Provisional	Named after	Date	Site	Discoverer(s)	Category	Diam.	Ref
550301	2012 DF_{72}	—	January 27, 2003	Palomar	NEAT	EUN	1.5 km	MPC · JPL
550302	2012 DW_{74}	—	August 25, 2000	Cerro Tololo	Deep Ecliptic Survey	·	2.0 km	MPC · JPL
550303	2012 DK_{75}	—	October 11, 2010	Mount Lemmon	Mount Lemmon Survey	·	1.3 km	MPC · JPL
550304	2012 DJ_{78}	—	March 29, 2008	Kitt Peak	Spacewatch	·	1.7 km	MPC · JPL
550305	2012 DQ_{78}	—	November 1, 2005	Kitt Peak	Spacewatch	T_{j} (2.98) · EUP	4.1 km	MPC · JPL
550306	2012 DZ_{78}	—	March 3, 2000	Apache Point	SDSS	(5)	1.3 km	MPC · JPL
550307	2012 DR_{79}	—	January 29, 2003	Palomar	NEAT	·	1.7 km	MPC · JPL
550308	2012 DX_{79}	—	October 23, 2001	Palomar	NEAT	·	2.4 km	MPC · JPL
550309	2012 DT_{80}	—	February 26, 2012	Haleakala	Pan-STARRS 1	·	1.6 km	MPC · JPL
550310	2012 DD_{86}	—	January 19, 2012	Haleakala	Pan-STARRS 1	centaur	70 km	MPC · JPL
550311	2012 DO_{86}	—	March 24, 2003	Haleakala	NEAT	·	2.4 km	MPC · JPL
550312	2012 DD_{87}	—	January 18, 2012	Kitt Peak	Spacewatch	·	620 m	MPC · JPL
550313	2012 DE_{87}	—	February 13, 2012	Kitt Peak	Spacewatch	·	1.5 km	MPC · JPL
550314	2012 DL_{87}	—	February 24, 2012	Haleakala	Pan-STARRS 1	·	1.0 km	MPC · JPL
550315	2012 DP_{87}	—	February 24, 2012	Haleakala	Pan-STARRS 1	·	2.1 km	MPC · JPL
550316	2012 DT_{87}	—	December 25, 2011	Mount Lemmon	Mount Lemmon Survey	·	2.3 km	MPC · JPL
550317	2012 DT_{88}	—	December 21, 2006	Kitt Peak	L. H. Wasserman, M. W. Buie	GEF	1.5 km	MPC · JPL
550318	2012 DZ_{90}	—	August 6, 2005	Palomar	NEAT	·	1.4 km	MPC · JPL
550319	2012 DV_{91}	—	April 4, 2008	Mount Lemmon	Mount Lemmon Survey	·	1.7 km	MPC · JPL
550320	2012 DK_{94}	—	February 15, 2012	Haleakala	Pan-STARRS 1	·	1.5 km	MPC · JPL
550321	2012 DP_{94}	—	August 6, 2005	Palomar	NEAT	·	1.9 km	MPC · JPL
550322	2012 DJ_{96}	—	February 23, 2012	Mount Lemmon	Mount Lemmon Survey	·	1.6 km	MPC · JPL
550323	2012 DY_{96}	—	August 26, 2005	Palomar	NEAT	·	2.2 km	MPC · JPL
550324	2012 DU_{97}	—	March 14, 2012	Haleakala	Pan-STARRS 1	HNS	1.4 km	MPC · JPL
550325	2012 DC_{101}	—	February 21, 2012	Kitt Peak	Spacewatch	·	2.0 km	MPC · JPL
550326	2012 DT_{101}	—	August 31, 2005	Kitt Peak	Spacewatch	HNS	1.1 km	MPC · JPL
550327	2012 DG_{102}	—	November 12, 2010	Mount Lemmon	Mount Lemmon Survey	·	1.6 km	MPC · JPL
550328	2012 DP_{102}	—	April 6, 2008	Kitt Peak	Spacewatch	·	1.2 km	MPC · JPL
550329	2012 DR_{102}	—	February 23, 2012	Mount Lemmon	Mount Lemmon Survey	·	1.4 km	MPC · JPL
550330	2012 DS_{103}	—	February 27, 2012	Kitt Peak	Spacewatch	·	1.6 km	MPC · JPL
550331	2012 DH_{104}	—	October 26, 2005	Kitt Peak	Spacewatch	·	1.7 km	MPC · JPL
550332	2012 DM_{104}	—	January 29, 2007	Kitt Peak	Spacewatch	AGN	1.1 km	MPC · JPL
550333	2012 DY_{105}	—	February 29, 2012	Oukaïmeden	M. Ory	·	1.5 km	MPC · JPL
550334	2012 DA_{106}	—	February 20, 2012	Haleakala	Pan-STARRS 1	·	1.9 km	MPC · JPL
550335	2012 DJ_{106}	—	February 28, 2012	Haleakala	Pan-STARRS 1	·	1.7 km	MPC · JPL
550336	2012 DD_{107}	—	February 27, 2012	Kitt Peak	Spacewatch	·	1.0 km	MPC · JPL
550337	2012 DL_{108}	—	February 16, 2012	Haleakala	Pan-STARRS 1	·	580 m	MPC · JPL
550338	2012 DH_{109}	—	February 20, 2012	Haleakala	Pan-STARRS 1	·	1.5 km	MPC · JPL
550339	2012 DJ_{111}	—	February 18, 2012	Catalina	CSS	·	1.4 km	MPC · JPL
550340	2012 DY_{111}	—	October 28, 2006	Mount Lemmon	Mount Lemmon Survey	·	1.9 km	MPC · JPL
550341	2012 DH_{115}	—	February 27, 2012	Haleakala	Pan-STARRS 1	HOF	1.7 km	MPC · JPL
550342	2012 DL_{116}	—	January 19, 2012	Mount Lemmon	Mount Lemmon Survey	·	1.7 km	MPC · JPL
550343	2012 DM_{116}	—	February 27, 2012	Haleakala	Pan-STARRS 1	·	1.7 km	MPC · JPL
550344	2012 DQ_{121}	—	February 20, 2012	Haleakala	Pan-STARRS 1	·	1.6 km	MPC · JPL
550345	2012 ED_{3}	—	January 10, 2007	Kitt Peak	Spacewatch	·	1.7 km	MPC · JPL
550346	2012 ED_{6}	—	March 13, 2012	Mount Lemmon	Mount Lemmon Survey	·	1.2 km	MPC · JPL
550347	2012 EH_{6}	—	February 26, 2012	Haleakala	Pan-STARRS 1	(5)	1.0 km	MPC · JPL
550348	2012 EK_{9}	—	January 19, 2012	Haleakala	Pan-STARRS 1	·	1.4 km	MPC · JPL
550349	2012 EH_{16}	—	March 22, 2012	Catalina	CSS	·	2.2 km	MPC · JPL
550350	2012 EO_{18}	—	March 14, 2012	Haleakala	Pan-STARRS 1	H	490 m	MPC · JPL
550351	2012 ER_{20}	—	May 8, 2013	Haleakala	Pan-STARRS 1	·	1.3 km	MPC · JPL
550352	2012 EC_{21}	—	April 24, 2003	Kitt Peak	Spacewatch	·	1.7 km	MPC · JPL
550353	2012 ED_{21}	—	January 28, 2016	Mount Lemmon	Mount Lemmon Survey	·	1.9 km	MPC · JPL
550354	2012 EO_{22}	—	March 15, 2012	Mount Lemmon	Mount Lemmon Survey	·	1.7 km	MPC · JPL
550355	2012 EP_{23}	—	March 15, 2012	Mount Lemmon	Mount Lemmon Survey	·	1.4 km	MPC · JPL
550356	2012 EL_{25}	—	March 15, 2012	Mount Lemmon	Mount Lemmon Survey	·	1.4 km	MPC · JPL
550357	2012 ED_{26}	—	March 14, 2012	Catalina	CSS	·	1.7 km	MPC · JPL
550358	2012 FA_{3}	—	March 15, 2012	Mount Lemmon	Mount Lemmon Survey	·	1.3 km	MPC · JPL
550359	2012 FA_{4}	—	December 27, 2011	Mount Lemmon	Mount Lemmon Survey	·	2.2 km	MPC · JPL
550360	2012 FF_{4}	—	January 10, 2007	Mount Lemmon	Mount Lemmon Survey	(13314)	1.5 km	MPC · JPL
550361	2012 FF_{10}	—	February 29, 2012	Catalina	CSS	·	2.2 km	MPC · JPL
550362	2012 FX_{12}	—	April 16, 2005	Kitt Peak	Spacewatch	MAS	630 m	MPC · JPL
550363	2012 FH_{14}	—	March 31, 2003	Apache Point	SDSS Collaboration	·	2.7 km	MPC · JPL
550364	2012 FO_{14}	—	March 18, 2012	Piszkéstető	K. Sárneczky	·	1.7 km	MPC · JPL
550365	2012 FM_{17}	—	April 27, 2008	Kitt Peak	Spacewatch	·	1.6 km	MPC · JPL
550366	2012 FY_{17}	—	March 17, 2012	Mount Lemmon	Mount Lemmon Survey	·	1.6 km	MPC · JPL
550367	2012 FO_{18}	—	February 21, 2012	Kitt Peak	Spacewatch	·	1.5 km	MPC · JPL
550368	2012 FE_{20}	—	February 25, 2012	Kitt Peak	Spacewatch	·	2.2 km	MPC · JPL
550369	2012 FP_{22}	—	October 7, 2010	Kitt Peak	Spacewatch	·	1.5 km	MPC · JPL
550370	2012 FF_{26}	—	March 26, 2003	Kitt Peak	Spacewatch	WIT	1.4 km	MPC · JPL
550371	2012 FK_{26}	—	April 16, 2005	Kitt Peak	Spacewatch	MAS	700 m	MPC · JPL
550372	2012 FO_{29}	—	November 9, 2009	Mount Lemmon	Mount Lemmon Survey	DOR	2.0 km	MPC · JPL
550373	2012 FS_{41}	—	March 10, 2003	Anderson Mesa	LONEOS	ADE	2.0 km	MPC · JPL
550374	2012 FT_{46}	—	March 16, 2012	Mount Lemmon	Mount Lemmon Survey	·	1.4 km	MPC · JPL
550375	2012 FR_{47}	—	March 13, 2012	Mount Lemmon	Mount Lemmon Survey	·	670 m	MPC · JPL
550376	2012 FT_{47}	—	October 10, 2004	Kitt Peak	Deep Ecliptic Survey	·	830 m	MPC · JPL
550377	2012 FM_{50}	—	February 24, 2012	Kitt Peak	Spacewatch	·	1.7 km	MPC · JPL
550378	2012 FG_{51}	—	March 24, 2012	Mount Lemmon	Mount Lemmon Survey	·	1.7 km	MPC · JPL
550379	2012 FU_{52}	—	March 12, 2012	Kitt Peak	Spacewatch	·	1.3 km	MPC · JPL
550380	2012 FG_{53}	—	March 22, 2012	Catalina	CSS	·	2.1 km	MPC · JPL
550381	2012 FC_{54}	—	February 27, 2012	Haleakala	Pan-STARRS 1	·	1.4 km	MPC · JPL
550382	2012 FC_{57}	—	November 28, 2011	Mount Lemmon	Mount Lemmon Survey	·	2.6 km	MPC · JPL
550383	2012 FA_{61}	—	September 15, 2009	Kitt Peak	Spacewatch	·	2.5 km	MPC · JPL
550384	2012 FB_{61}	—	March 28, 2012	Kitt Peak	Spacewatch	·	1.7 km	MPC · JPL
550385	2012 FY_{61}	—	November 1, 2000	Kitt Peak	Spacewatch	·	2.5 km	MPC · JPL
550386	2012 FO_{66}	—	December 23, 2000	Apache Point	SDSS	ERI	1.6 km	MPC · JPL
550387	2012 FH_{74}	—	March 24, 2012	Kitt Peak	Spacewatch	·	1.9 km	MPC · JPL
550388	2012 FQ_{77}	—	March 10, 2003	Anderson Mesa	LONEOS	·	2.6 km	MPC · JPL
550389	2012 FO_{78}	—	January 2, 2011	Mayhill-ISON	L. Elenin	V	920 m	MPC · JPL
550390	2012 FU_{79}	—	April 12, 2005	Mount Lemmon	Mount Lemmon Survey	·	750 m	MPC · JPL
550391	2012 FE_{80}	—	February 23, 2007	Mount Lemmon	Mount Lemmon Survey	·	1.7 km	MPC · JPL
550392	2012 FV_{81}	—	January 28, 2006	Catalina	CSS	·	4.4 km	MPC · JPL
550393	2012 FU_{85}	—	March 21, 2012	Catalina	CSS	EUN	930 m	MPC · JPL
550394	2012 FY_{85}	—	March 24, 2012	Kitt Peak	Spacewatch	·	1.5 km	MPC · JPL
550395	2012 FB_{87}	—	March 29, 2012	Kitt Peak	Spacewatch	·	1.9 km	MPC · JPL
550396	2012 FS_{87}	—	March 28, 2012	Haleakala	Pan-STARRS 1	·	1.9 km	MPC · JPL
550397	2012 FA_{88}	—	March 5, 2008	Kitt Peak	Spacewatch	·	1.1 km	MPC · JPL
550398	2012 FA_{90}	—	December 4, 2015	Haleakala	Pan-STARRS 1	BRA	1.5 km	MPC · JPL
550399	2012 FW_{94}	—	April 1, 2017	Haleakala	Pan-STARRS 1	·	1.7 km	MPC · JPL
550400	2012 FB_{104}	—	March 23, 2012	Mount Lemmon	Mount Lemmon Survey	·	1.4 km	MPC · JPL

== 550401–550500 ==
back to top

Designation			Discovery			Properties		Ref
Permanent	Provisional	Named after	Date	Site	Discoverer(s)	Category	Diam.	Ref
550401	2012 FN_{104}	—	March 29, 2012	Haleakala	Pan-STARRS 1	·	2.1 km	MPC · JPL
550402	2012 GW	—	March 14, 2012	Haleakala	Pan-STARRS 1	H	460 m	MPC · JPL
550403	2012 GZ_{1}	—	April 1, 2012	Catalina	CSS	·	1.8 km	MPC · JPL
550404	2012 GO_{5}	—	September 15, 2009	Kitt Peak	Spacewatch	·	1.6 km	MPC · JPL
550405	2012 GL_{8}	—	March 5, 2012	Kitt Peak	Spacewatch	·	1.9 km	MPC · JPL
550406	2012 GH_{9}	—	April 13, 2012	Haleakala	Pan-STARRS 1	AGN	1 km	MPC · JPL
550407	2012 GW_{10}	—	January 4, 2011	Mount Lemmon	Mount Lemmon Survey	·	1.5 km	MPC · JPL
550408	2012 GF_{13}	—	November 17, 2006	Kitt Peak	Spacewatch	·	1.8 km	MPC · JPL
550409	2012 GN_{13}	—	February 14, 2007	Lulin	LUSS	·	2.2 km	MPC · JPL
550410	2012 GD_{14}	—	March 11, 2007	Mount Lemmon	Mount Lemmon Survey	·	1.5 km	MPC · JPL
550411	2012 GF_{14}	—	April 13, 2012	Haleakala	Pan-STARRS 1	·	1.5 km	MPC · JPL
550412	2012 GU_{24}	—	August 22, 2009	Hibiscus	Teamo, N.	NYS	820 m	MPC · JPL
550413	2012 GZ_{29}	—	March 27, 2003	Palomar	NEAT	·	1.6 km	MPC · JPL
550414	2012 GN_{30}	—	November 1, 1999	Kitt Peak	Spacewatch	TIN	1.1 km	MPC · JPL
550415	2012 GU_{30}	—	April 12, 2012	Haleakala	Pan-STARRS 1	·	1.9 km	MPC · JPL
550416	2012 GS_{32}	—	November 3, 2005	Kitt Peak	Spacewatch	·	1.9 km	MPC · JPL
550417	2012 GV_{32}	—	October 24, 2005	Kitt Peak	Spacewatch	·	1.7 km	MPC · JPL
550418	2012 GG_{35}	—	March 9, 2007	Mount Lemmon	Mount Lemmon Survey	·	1.6 km	MPC · JPL
550419	2012 GX_{38}	—	July 29, 2008	Črni Vrh	Zakrajsek, J.	·	2.3 km	MPC · JPL
550420	2012 GF_{42}	—	April 15, 2012	Haleakala	Pan-STARRS 1	·	2.2 km	MPC · JPL
550421	2012 GN_{42}	—	April 15, 2012	Haleakala	Pan-STARRS 1	·	1.7 km	MPC · JPL
550422	2012 GR_{44}	—	August 9, 2013	Catalina	CSS	·	2.1 km	MPC · JPL
550423	2012 HH	—	October 31, 2005	Palomar	NEAT	H	580 m	MPC · JPL
550424	2012 HP_{11}	—	March 27, 2012	Catalina	CSS	·	1.6 km	MPC · JPL
550425	2012 HO_{14}	—	April 15, 2012	Haleakala	Pan-STARRS 1	DOR	2.5 km	MPC · JPL
550426	2012 HW_{14}	—	December 20, 2007	Kitt Peak	Spacewatch	ERI	1.2 km	MPC · JPL
550427	2012 HK_{15}	—	February 8, 2007	Mount Lemmon	Mount Lemmon Survey	·	2.0 km	MPC · JPL
550428	2012 HT_{15}	—	June 6, 2002	Palomar	NEAT	·	640 m	MPC · JPL
550429	2012 HA_{16}	—	April 15, 2012	Haleakala	Pan-STARRS 1	·	1.8 km	MPC · JPL
550430	2012 HY_{23}	—	December 6, 2010	Mount Lemmon	Mount Lemmon Survey	·	1.8 km	MPC · JPL
550431	2012 HH_{24}	—	April 15, 2012	Haleakala	Pan-STARRS 1	JUN	850 m	MPC · JPL
550432	2012 HP_{27}	—	April 24, 2012	Mount Lemmon	Mount Lemmon Survey	·	1.7 km	MPC · JPL
550433	2012 HW_{31}	—	March 4, 2001	Kitt Peak	Spacewatch	·	970 m	MPC · JPL
550434	2012 HZ_{34}	—	March 24, 2012	Mount Lemmon	Mount Lemmon Survey	·	2.2 km	MPC · JPL
550435	2012 HZ_{35}	—	March 29, 2012	Kitt Peak	Spacewatch	·	2.0 km	MPC · JPL
550436	2012 HP_{36}	—	April 22, 2012	Kitt Peak	Spacewatch	·	1.4 km	MPC · JPL
550437	2012 HD_{38}	—	March 15, 2007	Kitt Peak	Spacewatch	HOF	2.7 km	MPC · JPL
550438	2012 HG_{40}	—	March 29, 2012	Siding Spring	SSS	·	1.5 km	MPC · JPL
550439	2012 HW_{40}	—	May 28, 2008	Mount Lemmon	Mount Lemmon Survey	·	2.0 km	MPC · JPL
550440	2012 HT_{43}	—	February 22, 2007	Catalina	CSS	·	2.3 km	MPC · JPL
550441	2012 HL_{49}	—	April 15, 2012	Haleakala	Pan-STARRS 1	·	2.2 km	MPC · JPL
550442	2012 HC_{53}	—	April 27, 2012	Haleakala	Pan-STARRS 1	·	1.4 km	MPC · JPL
550443	2012 HN_{54}	—	April 15, 2012	Haleakala	Pan-STARRS 1	·	2.1 km	MPC · JPL
550444	2012 HS_{59}	—	January 29, 2011	Mount Lemmon	Mount Lemmon Survey	·	1.7 km	MPC · JPL
550445	2012 HH_{60}	—	November 17, 2009	Kitt Peak	Spacewatch	·	2.0 km	MPC · JPL
550446	2012 HQ_{60}	—	April 19, 2012	Mount Lemmon	Mount Lemmon Survey	·	1.3 km	MPC · JPL
550447	2012 HS_{60}	—	April 19, 2012	Mount Lemmon	Mount Lemmon Survey	AEO	1.0 km	MPC · JPL
550448	2012 HP_{65}	—	April 20, 2012	Mount Lemmon	Mount Lemmon Survey	·	2.0 km	MPC · JPL
550449	2012 HK_{68}	—	April 12, 2002	Palomar	NEAT	·	3.0 km	MPC · JPL
550450	2012 HB_{76}	—	April 28, 2003	Kitt Peak	Spacewatch	MRX	1.0 km	MPC · JPL
550451	2012 HW_{85}	—	April 19, 2012	Mount Lemmon	Mount Lemmon Survey	KOR	1.0 km	MPC · JPL
550452	2012 HY_{85}	—	September 20, 2009	Kitt Peak	Spacewatch	AST	1.5 km	MPC · JPL
550453	2012 HO_{86}	—	April 21, 2012	Kitt Peak	Spacewatch	·	1.6 km	MPC · JPL
550454	2012 HK_{88}	—	April 27, 2012	Haleakala	Pan-STARRS 1	·	850 m	MPC · JPL
550455	2012 HX_{88}	—	April 19, 2012	Mount Lemmon	Mount Lemmon Survey	·	1.3 km	MPC · JPL
550456	2012 HB_{99}	—	April 18, 2012	Mount Lemmon	Mount Lemmon Survey	·	1.4 km	MPC · JPL
550457	2012 HP_{100}	—	April 21, 2012	Mayhill-ISON	L. Elenin	·	1.1 km	MPC · JPL
550458	2012 HL_{102}	—	April 30, 2012	Kitt Peak	Spacewatch	KOR	1.2 km	MPC · JPL
550459	2012 JU_{8}	—	April 15, 2012	Haleakala	Pan-STARRS 1	·	2.4 km	MPC · JPL
550460	2012 JU_{12}	—	December 13, 2010	Mount Lemmon	Mount Lemmon Survey	·	2.0 km	MPC · JPL
550461	2012 JF_{14}	—	March 12, 2002	Kitt Peak	Spacewatch	·	1.7 km	MPC · JPL
550462	2012 JU_{14}	—	January 12, 2002	Palomar	NEAT	·	3.0 km	MPC · JPL
550463	2012 JS_{15}	—	August 21, 2008	Kitt Peak	Spacewatch	DOR	2.8 km	MPC · JPL
550464	2012 JV_{15}	—	May 12, 2012	Haleakala	Pan-STARRS 1	DOR	2.0 km	MPC · JPL
550465	2012 JE_{19}	—	February 13, 2008	Mount Lemmon	Mount Lemmon Survey	·	1.2 km	MPC · JPL
550466	2012 JJ_{19}	—	March 15, 2012	Mount Lemmon	Mount Lemmon Survey	·	2.1 km	MPC · JPL
550467	2012 JH_{22}	—	April 20, 2012	Mount Lemmon	Mount Lemmon Survey	H	390 m	MPC · JPL
550468	2012 JT_{31}	—	January 2, 2011	Mount Lemmon	Mount Lemmon Survey	·	1.5 km	MPC · JPL
550469	2012 JU_{31}	—	April 13, 2008	Mount Lemmon	Mount Lemmon Survey	NYS	990 m	MPC · JPL
550470	2012 JF_{32}	—	October 18, 2009	Mount Lemmon	Mount Lemmon Survey	·	1.8 km	MPC · JPL
550471	2012 JJ_{32}	—	March 19, 2007	Mount Lemmon	Mount Lemmon Survey	·	2.2 km	MPC · JPL
550472	2012 JL_{36}	—	May 15, 2012	Mount Lemmon	Mount Lemmon Survey	·	1.9 km	MPC · JPL
550473	2012 JX_{36}	—	September 11, 2005	Kitt Peak	Spacewatch	·	940 m	MPC · JPL
550474	2012 JW_{40}	—	March 14, 2007	Mount Lemmon	Mount Lemmon Survey	615	1.4 km	MPC · JPL
550475	2012 JE_{43}	—	July 29, 2000	Anderson Mesa	LONEOS	·	1.4 km	MPC · JPL
550476	2012 JM_{45}	—	October 7, 2004	Palomar	NEAT	GEF	1.4 km	MPC · JPL
550477	2012 JR_{54}	—	May 1, 2012	Mount Lemmon	Mount Lemmon Survey	·	1.3 km	MPC · JPL
550478	2012 JM_{59}	—	March 28, 2012	Kitt Peak	Spacewatch	·	2.0 km	MPC · JPL
550479	2012 JV_{60}	—	March 9, 2002	Kitt Peak	Spacewatch	HOF	2.3 km	MPC · JPL
550480	2012 JJ_{61}	—	May 14, 2012	Mount Lemmon	Mount Lemmon Survey	·	1.9 km	MPC · JPL
550481	2012 JP_{65}	—	November 10, 2009	Kitt Peak	Spacewatch	·	2.3 km	MPC · JPL
550482	2012 JS_{65}	—	April 19, 2007	Mount Lemmon	Mount Lemmon Survey	·	2.3 km	MPC · JPL
550483	2012 JR_{70}	—	May 12, 2012	Haleakala	Pan-STARRS 1	·	1.1 km	MPC · JPL
550484	2012 KN_{1}	—	April 15, 2004	Apache Point	SDSS Collaboration	H	620 m	MPC · JPL
550485	2012 KW_{2}	—	December 30, 2005	Kitt Peak	Spacewatch	·	1.9 km	MPC · JPL
550486	2012 KX_{5}	—	February 25, 2003	Haleakala	NEAT	·	1.6 km	MPC · JPL
550487	2012 KV_{10}	—	April 27, 2012	Mount Lemmon	Mount Lemmon Survey	DOR	2.0 km	MPC · JPL
550488	2012 KE_{11}	—	August 21, 2002	Palomar	NEAT	H	570 m	MPC · JPL
550489	2012 KF_{13}	—	May 16, 2012	Mount Lemmon	Mount Lemmon Survey	615	1.1 km	MPC · JPL
550490	2012 KY_{19}	—	September 18, 2003	Haleakala	NEAT	·	720 m	MPC · JPL
550491	2012 KR_{22}	—	February 8, 2011	Mount Lemmon	Mount Lemmon Survey	HOF	2.3 km	MPC · JPL
550492	2012 KO_{27}	—	December 28, 2005	Kitt Peak	Spacewatch	·	2.1 km	MPC · JPL
550493	2012 KK_{33}	—	May 16, 2012	Mount Lemmon	Mount Lemmon Survey	·	1.1 km	MPC · JPL
550494	2012 KH_{35}	—	February 26, 2008	Mount Lemmon	Mount Lemmon Survey	MAS	510 m	MPC · JPL
550495	2012 KO_{35}	—	September 11, 2004	Kitt Peak	Spacewatch	·	1.7 km	MPC · JPL
550496	2012 KF_{37}	—	February 7, 2011	Mount Lemmon	Mount Lemmon Survey	·	1.7 km	MPC · JPL
550497	2012 KA_{39}	—	April 27, 2012	Haleakala	Pan-STARRS 1	·	630 m	MPC · JPL
550498	2012 KF_{40}	—	April 21, 2012	Mount Lemmon	Mount Lemmon Survey	·	1.8 km	MPC · JPL
550499	2012 KY_{47}	—	January 7, 2006	Mount Lemmon	Mount Lemmon Survey	·	1.7 km	MPC · JPL
550500	2012 KE_{50}	—	September 26, 2003	Apache Point	SDSS	·	3.8 km	MPC · JPL

== 550501–550600 ==
back to top

Designation			Discovery			Properties		Ref
Permanent	Provisional	Named after	Date	Site	Discoverer(s)	Category	Diam.	Ref
550501	2012 KP_{56}	—	September 9, 2013	Haleakala	Pan-STARRS 1	·	1.8 km	MPC · JPL
550502	2012 KW_{59}	—	May 18, 2012	Haleakala	Pan-STARRS 1	·	1.8 km	MPC · JPL
550503	2012 LJ_{1}	—	June 9, 2012	Haleakala	Pan-STARRS 1	H	510 m	MPC · JPL
550504	2012 LP_{7}	—	September 7, 2008	Mount Lemmon	Mount Lemmon Survey	·	1.8 km	MPC · JPL
550505	2012 LC_{11}	—	March 11, 2008	Siding Spring	SSS	PHO	1.3 km	MPC · JPL
550506	2012 LW_{11}	—	May 16, 2012	Kitt Peak	Spacewatch	·	3.8 km	MPC · JPL
550507	2012 LX_{15}	—	October 24, 2009	Kitt Peak	Spacewatch	BRA	1.3 km	MPC · JPL
550508	2012 LZ_{16}	—	September 1, 2005	Palomar	NEAT	PHO	890 m	MPC · JPL
550509	2012 LW_{20}	—	March 16, 2007	Mount Lemmon	Mount Lemmon Survey	·	1.2 km	MPC · JPL
550510	2012 LN_{22}	—	May 13, 2012	Mount Lemmon	Mount Lemmon Survey	EOS	1.7 km	MPC · JPL
550511	2012 LR_{27}	—	October 29, 2003	Socorro	LINEAR	·	2.1 km	MPC · JPL
550512	2012 LE_{29}	—	February 10, 2016	Haleakala	Pan-STARRS 1	·	2.9 km	MPC · JPL
550513	2012 MB_{8}	—	September 21, 2003	Kitt Peak	Spacewatch	·	2.0 km	MPC · JPL
550514	2012 MM_{10}	—	March 11, 2011	Mount Lemmon	Mount Lemmon Survey	·	2.8 km	MPC · JPL
550515	2012 MB_{11}	—	October 17, 2003	Kitt Peak	Spacewatch	·	2.2 km	MPC · JPL
550516	2012 MT_{11}	—	December 11, 2006	Kitt Peak	Spacewatch	·	800 m	MPC · JPL
550517	2012 MH_{12}	—	June 16, 2012	Haleakala	Pan-STARRS 1	·	3.5 km	MPC · JPL
550518	2012 MK_{13}	—	October 25, 2003	Kitt Peak	Spacewatch	·	2.1 km	MPC · JPL
550519	2012 MZ_{14}	—	November 21, 2008	Kitt Peak	Spacewatch	·	2.6 km	MPC · JPL
550520	2012 MT_{15}	—	December 29, 2003	Kitt Peak	Spacewatch	·	3.7 km	MPC · JPL
550521	2012 MP_{17}	—	June 19, 2012	Mount Lemmon	Mount Lemmon Survey	·	2.5 km	MPC · JPL
550522	2012 MR_{17}	—	December 8, 2013	Mount Lemmon	Mount Lemmon Survey	LIX	3.2 km	MPC · JPL
550523	2012 ME_{18}	—	June 14, 2007	Kitt Peak	Spacewatch	·	2.3 km	MPC · JPL
550524	2012 MS_{18}	—	June 17, 2012	Kitt Peak	Spacewatch	·	2.6 km	MPC · JPL
550525 Sigourneyweaver	2012 NL	Sigourneyweaver	July 12, 2012	Zelenchukskaya Stn	T. V. Krjačko, Satovski, B.	T_{j} (2.96)	3.0 km	MPC · JPL
550526	2012 OM	—	July 16, 2012	Castelmartini	Prosperi, E., Prosperi, S.	H	420 m	MPC · JPL
550527	2012 OY_{2}	—	October 5, 2007	Kitt Peak	Spacewatch	·	3.6 km	MPC · JPL
550528	2012 ON_{6}	—	September 21, 2007	XuYi	PMO NEO Survey Program	TIR	2.7 km	MPC · JPL
550529	2012 OY_{6}	—	July 21, 2012	Siding Spring	SSS	·	1.8 km	MPC · JPL
550530	2012 OF_{7}	—	July 19, 2012	Siding Spring	SSS	·	1.4 km	MPC · JPL
550531	2012 PP_{1}	—	August 27, 2005	Palomar	NEAT	·	940 m	MPC · JPL
550532	2012 PR_{1}	—	November 17, 2009	Kitt Peak	Spacewatch	·	630 m	MPC · JPL
550533	2012 PM_{2}	—	August 8, 2012	Haleakala	Pan-STARRS 1	·	3.0 km	MPC · JPL
550534	2012 PU_{5}	—	July 28, 2012	Haleakala	Pan-STARRS 1	·	3.6 km	MPC · JPL
550535	2012 PK_{7}	—	August 8, 2012	Haleakala	Pan-STARRS 1	T_{j} (2.99) · EUP	3.4 km	MPC · JPL
550536	2012 PB_{9}	—	April 28, 2011	Haleakala	Pan-STARRS 1	·	2.8 km	MPC · JPL
550537	2012 PG_{9}	—	August 8, 2012	Haleakala	Pan-STARRS 1	·	2.6 km	MPC · JPL
550538	2012 PX_{10}	—	September 14, 2004	Socorro	LINEAR	H	690 m	MPC · JPL
550539	2012 PS_{12}	—	August 10, 2012	Kitt Peak	Spacewatch	·	650 m	MPC · JPL
550540	2012 PG_{13}	—	August 16, 2002	Palomar	NEAT	·	670 m	MPC · JPL
550541	2012 PR_{15}	—	January 13, 2010	Kitt Peak	Spacewatch	·	1.4 km	MPC · JPL
550542	2012 PK_{20}	—	December 2, 2008	Kitt Peak	Spacewatch	EOS	2.3 km	MPC · JPL
550543	2012 PJ_{22}	—	December 4, 2007	Catalina	CSS	·	3.1 km	MPC · JPL
550544	2012 PV_{22}	—	August 5, 2007	Great Shefford	Birtwhistle, P.	·	2.0 km	MPC · JPL
550545	2012 PF_{23}	—	August 13, 2012	Haleakala	Pan-STARRS 1	·	2.6 km	MPC · JPL
550546	2012 PH_{26}	—	August 12, 2012	Siding Spring	SSS	·	2.5 km	MPC · JPL
550547	2012 PQ_{26}	—	August 13, 2012	Haleakala	Pan-STARRS 1	EOS	1.6 km	MPC · JPL
550548	2012 PG_{27}	—	September 9, 2007	Kitt Peak	Spacewatch	·	2.2 km	MPC · JPL
550549	2012 PY_{30}	—	March 11, 2011	Mount Lemmon	Mount Lemmon Survey	·	2.8 km	MPC · JPL
550550	2012 PF_{32}	—	July 18, 2012	Catalina	CSS	·	1.2 km	MPC · JPL
550551	2012 PR_{33}	—	September 18, 2007	Kitt Peak	Spacewatch	·	2.4 km	MPC · JPL
550552	2012 PD_{34}	—	January 25, 2011	Mount Lemmon	Mount Lemmon Survey	H	450 m	MPC · JPL
550553	2012 PG_{35}	—	August 11, 2012	Siding Spring	SSS	·	620 m	MPC · JPL
550554	2012 PO_{36}	—	August 24, 2001	Kitt Peak	Spacewatch	·	2.6 km	MPC · JPL
550555	2012 PD_{38}	—	August 6, 2012	Haleakala	Pan-STARRS 1	·	3.1 km	MPC · JPL
550556	2012 PF_{40}	—	June 23, 1995	Kitt Peak	Spacewatch	·	3.2 km	MPC · JPL
550557	2012 PG_{40}	—	November 20, 2008	Kitt Peak	Spacewatch	·	3.1 km	MPC · JPL
550558	2012 PU_{40}	—	August 13, 2012	Haleakala	Pan-STARRS 1	·	980 m	MPC · JPL
550559	2012 PZ_{40}	—	August 6, 2012	Haleakala	Pan-STARRS 1	·	2.1 km	MPC · JPL
550560	2012 PF_{42}	—	February 14, 2010	Kitt Peak	Spacewatch	·	3.3 km	MPC · JPL
550561	2012 PQ_{42}	—	August 13, 2012	Haleakala	Pan-STARRS 1	·	800 m	MPC · JPL
550562	2012 PZ_{44}	—	August 10, 2012	Kitt Peak	Spacewatch	·	2.5 km	MPC · JPL
550563	2012 PK_{45}	—	August 20, 2001	Cerro Tololo	Deep Ecliptic Survey	·	2.8 km	MPC · JPL
550564	2012 PU_{45}	—	August 6, 2012	Haleakala	Pan-STARRS 1	other TNO	147 km	MPC · JPL
550565	2012 PL_{47}	—	July 15, 2016	Mount Lemmon	Mount Lemmon Survey	·	770 m	MPC · JPL
550566	2012 PM_{47}	—	February 24, 2014	Haleakala	Pan-STARRS 1	PHO	880 m	MPC · JPL
550567	2012 PT_{48}	—	August 12, 2012	Siding Spring	SSS	·	670 m	MPC · JPL
550568	2012 PQ_{49}	—	August 9, 2012	Les Engarouines	L. Bernasconi	·	2.9 km	MPC · JPL
550569	2012 PT_{49}	—	January 16, 2015	Haleakala	Pan-STARRS 1	·	2.8 km	MPC · JPL
550570	2012 PY_{49}	—	August 13, 2012	Haleakala	Pan-STARRS 1	EOS	1.4 km	MPC · JPL
550571	2012 PS_{55}	—	August 13, 2012	Haleakala	Pan-STARRS 1	·	1.5 km	MPC · JPL
550572	2012 QB_{1}	—	February 22, 2004	Kitt Peak	Spacewatch	·	2.7 km	MPC · JPL
550573	2012 QP_{6}	—	September 16, 2009	Mount Lemmon	Mount Lemmon Survey	·	690 m	MPC · JPL
550574	2012 QT_{9}	—	January 19, 2007	Mauna Kea	P. A. Wiegert	(2076)	580 m	MPC · JPL
550575	2012 QC_{12}	—	October 11, 2007	Catalina	CSS	·	3.3 km	MPC · JPL
550576	2012 QQ_{13}	—	August 17, 2012	Haleakala	Pan-STARRS 1	·	2.5 km	MPC · JPL
550577	2012 QB_{15}	—	August 14, 2012	Siding Spring	SSS	TIR	3.1 km	MPC · JPL
550578	2012 QM_{15}	—	December 18, 2009	Mount Lemmon	Mount Lemmon Survey	·	3.3 km	MPC · JPL
550579	2012 QP_{15}	—	May 9, 2011	Mount Lemmon	Mount Lemmon Survey	EMA	2.8 km	MPC · JPL
550580	2012 QJ_{17}	—	May 23, 2012	Mount Lemmon	Mount Lemmon Survey	·	1.3 km	MPC · JPL
550581	2012 QK_{17}	—	August 26, 2012	La Sagra	OAM	·	3.6 km	MPC · JPL
550582	2012 QG_{20}	—	February 12, 2004	Kitt Peak	Spacewatch	·	680 m	MPC · JPL
550583	2012 QO_{20}	—	December 29, 2008	Kitt Peak	Spacewatch	·	2.1 km	MPC · JPL
550584	2012 QV_{22}	—	August 17, 2012	Les Engarouines	L. Bernasconi	·	2.7 km	MPC · JPL
550585	2012 QE_{24}	—	August 24, 2012	Kitt Peak	Spacewatch	·	2.6 km	MPC · JPL
550586	2012 QE_{25}	—	November 20, 2007	Mount Lemmon	Mount Lemmon Survey	HYG	2.6 km	MPC · JPL
550587	2012 QY_{25}	—	February 16, 2005	La Silla	A. Boattini	·	660 m	MPC · JPL
550588	2012 QZ_{29}	—	December 1, 2005	Kitt Peak	Wasserman, L. H., Millis, R. L.	·	910 m	MPC · JPL
550589	2012 QG_{31}	—	February 12, 2004	Kitt Peak	Spacewatch	·	3.6 km	MPC · JPL
550590	2012 QR_{32}	—	August 25, 2012	Kitt Peak	Spacewatch	·	2.4 km	MPC · JPL
550591	2012 QC_{33}	—	August 25, 2012	Kitt Peak	Spacewatch	·	2.6 km	MPC · JPL
550592	2012 QH_{34}	—	August 14, 2012	Kitt Peak	Spacewatch	·	2.5 km	MPC · JPL
550593	2012 QO_{34}	—	February 3, 2009	Kitt Peak	Spacewatch	·	2.4 km	MPC · JPL
550594	2012 QT_{34}	—	August 25, 2012	Kitt Peak	Spacewatch	·	3.2 km	MPC · JPL
550595	2012 QP_{38}	—	November 3, 2007	Kitt Peak	Spacewatch	THM	2.1 km	MPC · JPL
550596	2012 QX_{38}	—	August 5, 2005	Palomar	NEAT	·	790 m	MPC · JPL
550597	2012 QT_{40}	—	July 19, 2012	Siding Spring	SSS	·	720 m	MPC · JPL
550598	2012 QT_{41}	—	August 6, 2005	Palomar	NEAT	·	890 m	MPC · JPL
550599	2012 QC_{42}	—	August 17, 2001	Palomar	NEAT	·	1.3 km	MPC · JPL
550600	2012 QJ_{42}	—	August 16, 2012	Haleakala	Pan-STARRS 1	L5	6.9 km	MPC · JPL

== 550601–550700 ==
back to top

Designation			Discovery			Properties		Ref
Permanent	Provisional	Named after	Date	Site	Discoverer(s)	Category	Diam.	Ref
550601	2012 QS_{42}	—	August 16, 2012	ESA OGS	ESA OGS	·	1.8 km	MPC · JPL
550602	2012 QY_{42}	—	September 3, 2007	Catalina	CSS	·	3.0 km	MPC · JPL
550603	2012 QX_{43}	—	August 17, 2012	Haleakala	Pan-STARRS 1	·	3.3 km	MPC · JPL
550604	2012 QF_{46}	—	July 28, 2012	Haleakala	Pan-STARRS 1	·	3.3 km	MPC · JPL
550605	2012 QQ_{47}	—	July 29, 2008	Kitt Peak	Spacewatch	·	970 m	MPC · JPL
550606	2012 QY_{48}	—	August 24, 2012	Kitt Peak	Spacewatch	·	3.0 km	MPC · JPL
550607	2012 QW_{51}	—	March 13, 2005	Kitt Peak	Spacewatch	·	2.4 km	MPC · JPL
550608	2012 QC_{57}	—	August 16, 2012	ESA OGS	ESA OGS	PHO	830 m	MPC · JPL
550609	2012 QS_{57}	—	November 17, 2009	Mount Lemmon	Mount Lemmon Survey	·	700 m	MPC · JPL
550610	2012 QF_{63}	—	March 5, 2016	Haleakala	Pan-STARRS 1	·	2.5 km	MPC · JPL
550611	2012 QL_{64}	—	August 26, 2012	Haleakala	Pan-STARRS 1	·	2.7 km	MPC · JPL
550612	2012 RE_{4}	—	November 22, 2005	Palomar	NEAT	·	1.2 km	MPC · JPL
550613	2012 RO_{6}	—	September 11, 2012	Črni Vrh	Zakrajsek, J.	T_{j} (2.94)	3.2 km	MPC · JPL
550614	2012 RM_{7}	—	August 29, 2002	Palomar	NEAT	·	660 m	MPC · JPL
550615	2012 RP_{7}	—	August 27, 2009	Kitt Peak	Spacewatch	·	1.1 km	MPC · JPL
550616	2012 RC_{9}	—	October 30, 2002	Haleakala	NEAT	·	700 m	MPC · JPL
550617	2012 RS_{9}	—	September 14, 2012	Mount Lemmon	Mount Lemmon Survey	H	480 m	MPC · JPL
550618	2012 RZ_{9}	—	September 13, 2007	Mount Lemmon	Mount Lemmon Survey	TEL	1.8 km	MPC · JPL
550619	2012 RZ_{11}	—	August 24, 2008	Črni Vrh	Skvarč, J.	PHO	1.2 km	MPC · JPL
550620	2012 RD_{13}	—	September 13, 2012	Mount Lemmon	Mount Lemmon Survey	·	3.4 km	MPC · JPL
550621	2012 RU_{13}	—	September 14, 2012	Catalina	CSS	·	3.1 km	MPC · JPL
550622	2012 RV_{13}	—	April 10, 2005	Kitt Peak	Deep Ecliptic Survey	·	3.9 km	MPC · JPL
550623	2012 RC_{15}	—	September 15, 2012	Catalina	CSS	·	2.7 km	MPC · JPL
550624	2012 RK_{17}	—	July 29, 2005	Palomar	NEAT	·	730 m	MPC · JPL
550625	2012 RY_{18}	—	July 30, 2005	Palomar	NEAT	(2076)	700 m	MPC · JPL
550626	2012 RD_{21}	—	February 24, 2006	Palomar	NEAT	H	510 m	MPC · JPL
550627	2012 RW_{21}	—	August 23, 2012	Les Engarouines	L. Bernasconi	·	4.1 km	MPC · JPL
550628	2012 RJ_{23}	—	September 25, 2005	Kitt Peak	Spacewatch	·	770 m	MPC · JPL
550629	2012 RA_{24}	—	May 21, 2001	Cerro Tololo	Deep Ecliptic Survey	H	570 m	MPC · JPL
550630	2012 RX_{25}	—	September 16, 2004	Kitt Peak	Spacewatch	·	1.1 km	MPC · JPL
550631	2012 RA_{27}	—	August 30, 2005	Palomar	NEAT	·	700 m	MPC · JPL
550632	2012 RT_{27}	—	January 20, 2009	Mount Lemmon	Mount Lemmon Survey	·	3.5 km	MPC · JPL
550633	2012 RF_{32}	—	August 25, 2012	Haleakala	Pan-STARRS 1	·	640 m	MPC · JPL
550634	2012 RB_{33}	—	August 8, 2012	Haleakala	Pan-STARRS 1	H	380 m	MPC · JPL
550635	2012 RF_{35}	—	October 18, 2001	Palomar	NEAT	·	2.7 km	MPC · JPL
550636	2012 RK_{37}	—	May 1, 2008	Kitt Peak	Spacewatch	·	680 m	MPC · JPL
550637	2012 RW_{37}	—	September 17, 2001	Desert Eagle	W. K. Y. Yeung	·	3.3 km	MPC · JPL
550638	2012 RD_{40}	—	July 6, 2005	Siding Spring	SSS	·	920 m	MPC · JPL
550639	2012 RK_{40}	—	August 14, 2012	Haleakala	Pan-STARRS 1	PHO	800 m	MPC · JPL
550640	2012 RW_{41}	—	June 4, 2011	Lulin	LUSS	V	550 m	MPC · JPL
550641	2012 RT_{42}	—	July 15, 2002	Palomar	NEAT	·	730 m	MPC · JPL
550642	2012 RJ_{45}	—	September 15, 2012	ESA OGS	ESA OGS	THM	1.8 km	MPC · JPL
550643	2012 RH_{46}	—	September 15, 2012	Kitt Peak	Spacewatch	·	2.6 km	MPC · JPL
550644	2012 SG_{1}	—	February 27, 2007	Kitt Peak	Spacewatch	·	920 m	MPC · JPL
550645	2012 SJ_{5}	—	March 18, 2010	Mount Lemmon	Mount Lemmon Survey	·	2.8 km	MPC · JPL
550646	2012 SK_{5}	—	November 3, 2004	Palomar	NEAT	·	1.0 km	MPC · JPL
550647	2012 SB_{8}	—	October 9, 2007	Mount Lemmon	Mount Lemmon Survey	·	1.5 km	MPC · JPL
550648	2012 SF_{20}	—	August 25, 2012	Kitt Peak	Spacewatch	·	2.0 km	MPC · JPL
550649	2012 ST_{20}	—	December 27, 2006	Mount Lemmon	Mount Lemmon Survey	·	680 m	MPC · JPL
550650	2012 SB_{21}	—	January 1, 2009	Mount Lemmon	Mount Lemmon Survey	·	2.5 km	MPC · JPL
550651	2012 SE_{23}	—	September 29, 2005	Kitt Peak	Spacewatch	·	880 m	MPC · JPL
550652	2012 SL_{28}	—	July 29, 2005	Palomar	NEAT	·	860 m	MPC · JPL
550653	2012 SJ_{29}	—	May 24, 2011	Nogales	M. Schwartz, P. R. Holvorcem	EOS	1.8 km	MPC · JPL
550654	2012 SV_{31}	—	September 21, 2012	Kitt Peak	Spacewatch	·	880 m	MPC · JPL
550655	2012 SX_{36}	—	March 2, 2011	Mount Lemmon	Mount Lemmon Survey	·	1.1 km	MPC · JPL
550656	2012 SE_{41}	—	August 26, 2012	Haleakala	Pan-STARRS 1	·	770 m	MPC · JPL
550657	2012 SL_{42}	—	February 10, 2011	Mount Lemmon	Mount Lemmon Survey	·	570 m	MPC · JPL
550658	2012 SN_{43}	—	September 20, 2001	Socorro	LINEAR	EOS	2.2 km	MPC · JPL
550659	2012 ST_{43}	—	September 18, 2012	Mount Lemmon	Mount Lemmon Survey	·	990 m	MPC · JPL
550660	2012 SX_{44}	—	August 14, 2006	Siding Spring	SSS	·	4.2 km	MPC · JPL
550661	2012 SS_{47}	—	November 2, 2007	Mount Lemmon	Mount Lemmon Survey	·	2.5 km	MPC · JPL
550662	2012 SP_{50}	—	September 18, 2012	Mount Lemmon SkyCe	T. Vorobjov, Kostin, A.	·	960 m	MPC · JPL
550663	2012 SM_{51}	—	August 12, 2006	Palomar	NEAT	·	3.3 km	MPC · JPL
550664	2012 SK_{53}	—	August 5, 2005	Palomar	NEAT	·	860 m	MPC · JPL
550665	2012 SF_{55}	—	September 19, 2012	Mount Lemmon	Mount Lemmon Survey	·	3.0 km	MPC · JPL
550666 Difrancesco	2012 SJ_{55}	Difrancesco	October 23, 2006	Mauna Kea	D. D. Balam	·	2.6 km	MPC · JPL
550667	2012 SV_{61}	—	August 26, 2012	Haleakala	Pan-STARRS 1	·	3.0 km	MPC · JPL
550668	2012 SD_{64}	—	June 5, 2002	Palomar	NEAT	·	720 m	MPC · JPL
550669	2012 SE_{64}	—	July 21, 2006	Lulin	LUSS	EOS	2.6 km	MPC · JPL
550670	2012 SE_{65}	—	September 26, 2012	Nogales	M. Schwartz, P. R. Holvorcem	EUN	1.6 km	MPC · JPL
550671	2012 SZ_{66}	—	October 9, 2008	Kitt Peak	Spacewatch	·	920 m	MPC · JPL
550672	2012 SQ_{69}	—	November 1, 2008	Mount Lemmon	Mount Lemmon Survey	·	1.5 km	MPC · JPL
550673	2012 SN_{71}	—	February 11, 2004	Kitt Peak	Spacewatch	EOS	2.0 km	MPC · JPL
550674	2012 SW_{71}	—	October 15, 1995	Kitt Peak	Spacewatch	·	710 m	MPC · JPL
550675	2012 SB_{72}	—	September 23, 2012	Kitt Peak	Spacewatch	·	3.0 km	MPC · JPL
550676	2012 SG_{72}	—	August 24, 2012	Kitt Peak	Spacewatch	·	550 m	MPC · JPL
550677	2012 SV_{72}	—	September 16, 2012	Mount Lemmon	Mount Lemmon Survey	·	2.6 km	MPC · JPL
550678	2012 SW_{73}	—	September 23, 2012	Kitt Peak	Spacewatch	·	860 m	MPC · JPL
550679	2012 SQ_{74}	—	September 16, 2012	ESA OGS	ESA OGS	·	1.2 km	MPC · JPL
550680	2012 SH_{79}	—	September 24, 2012	Mount Lemmon	Mount Lemmon Survey	ELF	2.9 km	MPC · JPL
550681	2012 SF_{85}	—	August 24, 2017	Haleakala	Pan-STARRS 1	·	2.3 km	MPC · JPL
550682	2012 SQ_{85}	—	September 24, 2012	Kitt Peak	Spacewatch	·	830 m	MPC · JPL
550683	2012 SV_{86}	—	September 16, 2012	ESA OGS	ESA OGS	PHO	840 m	MPC · JPL
550684	2012 SB_{88}	—	September 23, 2012	Mount Lemmon	Mount Lemmon Survey	·	2.5 km	MPC · JPL
550685	2012 SJ_{88}	—	September 20, 2012	Mount Lemmon	Mount Lemmon Survey	H	460 m	MPC · JPL
550686	2012 SS_{88}	—	September 24, 2012	Mount Lemmon	Mount Lemmon Survey	·	2.7 km	MPC · JPL
550687	2012 TY	—	October 25, 2005	Mount Lemmon	Mount Lemmon Survey	NYS	1.0 km	MPC · JPL
550688	2012 TU_{1}	—	September 14, 2012	Catalina	CSS	URS	2.8 km	MPC · JPL
550689	2012 TD_{2}	—	July 30, 2005	Palomar	NEAT	·	840 m	MPC · JPL
550690	2012 TS_{2}	—	September 19, 2012	Mount Lemmon	Mount Lemmon Survey	H	320 m	MPC · JPL
550691	2012 TD_{3}	—	August 13, 2001	Haleakala	NEAT	·	1.4 km	MPC · JPL
550692	2012 TM_{3}	—	November 12, 2001	Apache Point	SDSS	·	3.4 km	MPC · JPL
550693	2012 TJ_{4}	—	October 5, 2012	Haleakala	Pan-STARRS 1	H	620 m	MPC · JPL
550694	2012 TT_{6}	—	March 23, 2001	Haleakala	NEAT	·	870 m	MPC · JPL
550695	2012 TV_{6}	—	March 17, 2004	Kitt Peak	Spacewatch	VER	2.5 km	MPC · JPL
550696	2012 TL_{7}	—	October 10, 2008	Mount Lemmon	Mount Lemmon Survey	·	1.2 km	MPC · JPL
550697	2012 TO_{7}	—	October 15, 2001	Apache Point	SDSS	EOS	2.4 km	MPC · JPL
550698	2012 TW_{8}	—	November 20, 2001	Socorro	LINEAR	·	3.2 km	MPC · JPL
550699	2012 TN_{9}	—	September 24, 2012	Kitt Peak	Spacewatch	·	3.1 km	MPC · JPL
550700	2012 TB_{10}	—	August 17, 2006	Palomar	NEAT	·	3.0 km	MPC · JPL

== 550701–550800 ==
back to top

Designation			Discovery			Properties		Ref
Permanent	Provisional	Named after	Date	Site	Discoverer(s)	Category	Diam.	Ref
550701	2012 TD_{12}	—	March 16, 2004	Kitt Peak	Spacewatch	EOS	1.8 km	MPC · JPL
550702	2012 TS_{12}	—	September 16, 2012	Mount Lemmon	Mount Lemmon Survey	·	740 m	MPC · JPL
550703	2012 TW_{14}	—	May 7, 2002	Palomar	NEAT	·	770 m	MPC · JPL
550704	2012 TN_{16}	—	September 18, 2012	Kitt Peak	Spacewatch	·	940 m	MPC · JPL
550705	2012 TW_{16}	—	December 4, 2005	Kitt Peak	Spacewatch	MAS	700 m	MPC · JPL
550706	2012 TA_{17}	—	April 14, 2010	Kitt Peak	Spacewatch	·	3.2 km	MPC · JPL
550707	2012 TF_{19}	—	September 14, 2012	Kitt Peak	Spacewatch	·	720 m	MPC · JPL
550708	2012 TT_{19}	—	April 14, 2010	Mount Lemmon	Mount Lemmon Survey	·	3.1 km	MPC · JPL
550709	2012 TD_{20}	—	October 7, 2012	Haleakala	Pan-STARRS 1	H	590 m	MPC · JPL
550710	2012 TW_{20}	—	September 22, 2012	Kitt Peak	Spacewatch	·	500 m	MPC · JPL
550711	2012 TM_{21}	—	September 26, 2006	Kitt Peak	Spacewatch	·	3.4 km	MPC · JPL
550712	2012 TD_{22}	—	October 6, 2012	Mount Lemmon	Mount Lemmon Survey	·	3.4 km	MPC · JPL
550713	2012 TY_{23}	—	October 4, 2002	Palomar	NEAT	·	890 m	MPC · JPL
550714	2012 TG_{24}	—	October 8, 2012	Mount Lemmon	Mount Lemmon Survey	·	2.6 km	MPC · JPL
550715	2012 TW_{30}	—	February 25, 2007	Kitt Peak	Spacewatch	·	1.1 km	MPC · JPL
550716	2012 TL_{31}	—	August 26, 2012	Haleakala	Pan-STARRS 1	·	2.8 km	MPC · JPL
550717	2012 TA_{34}	—	October 18, 2007	Kitt Peak	Spacewatch	·	2.8 km	MPC · JPL
550718	2012 TP_{36}	—	September 16, 2012	Mount Lemmon	Mount Lemmon Survey	·	2.7 km	MPC · JPL
550719	2012 TD_{44}	—	May 24, 2011	Haleakala	Pan-STARRS 1	V	650 m	MPC · JPL
550720	2012 TM_{44}	—	October 8, 2012	Mount Lemmon	Mount Lemmon Survey	·	2.4 km	MPC · JPL
550721	2012 TK_{46}	—	January 6, 2010	Kitt Peak	Spacewatch	·	880 m	MPC · JPL
550722	2012 TF_{49}	—	October 8, 2012	Haleakala	Pan-STARRS 1	·	600 m	MPC · JPL
550723	2012 TE_{50}	—	February 24, 2009	Mount Lemmon	Mount Lemmon Survey	·	2.5 km	MPC · JPL
550724	2012 TV_{59}	—	October 8, 2012	Mount Lemmon	Mount Lemmon Survey	·	840 m	MPC · JPL
550725	2012 TP_{61}	—	November 20, 2007	Kitt Peak	Spacewatch	·	3.4 km	MPC · JPL
550726	2012 TW_{61}	—	November 2, 2007	Kitt Peak	Spacewatch	·	2.5 km	MPC · JPL
550727	2012 TJ_{65}	—	February 12, 2004	Kitt Peak	Spacewatch	·	840 m	MPC · JPL
550728	2012 TY_{68}	—	October 27, 2005	Kitt Peak	Spacewatch	SYL	4.5 km	MPC · JPL
550729	2012 TG_{69}	—	November 13, 2001	Uppsala-Kvistaberg	Kvistaberg	·	3.0 km	MPC · JPL
550730	2012 TS_{72}	—	October 9, 2012	Mount Lemmon	Mount Lemmon Survey	·	730 m	MPC · JPL
550731	2012 TV_{72}	—	July 6, 2005	Siding Spring	SSS	·	850 m	MPC · JPL
550732	2012 TK_{73}	—	May 10, 2005	Cerro Tololo	Deep Ecliptic Survey	(1298)	3.1 km	MPC · JPL
550733	2012 TK_{77}	—	May 6, 2006	Mount Lemmon	Mount Lemmon Survey	HNS	1.3 km	MPC · JPL
550734	2012 TM_{80}	—	October 5, 2002	Palomar	NEAT	·	690 m	MPC · JPL
550735	2012 TO_{85}	—	October 6, 2012	Mount Lemmon	Mount Lemmon Survey	VER	1.9 km	MPC · JPL
550736	2012 TH_{86}	—	September 23, 2012	Mount Lemmon	Mount Lemmon Survey	(1118)	2.7 km	MPC · JPL
550737	2012 TR_{86}	—	November 12, 2001	Apache Point	SDSS Collaboration	·	2.8 km	MPC · JPL
550738	2012 TZ_{87}	—	October 6, 2012	Mount Lemmon	Mount Lemmon Survey	·	1.1 km	MPC · JPL
550739	2012 TH_{90}	—	April 29, 2008	Mount Lemmon	Mount Lemmon Survey	·	560 m	MPC · JPL
550740	2012 TD_{91}	—	August 4, 2005	Palomar	NEAT	·	690 m	MPC · JPL
550741	2012 TW_{91}	—	October 7, 2012	Haleakala	Pan-STARRS 1	·	2.3 km	MPC · JPL
550742	2012 TP_{94}	—	October 8, 2012	Mayhill-ISON	L. Elenin	·	1.2 km	MPC · JPL
550743	2012 TR_{94}	—	September 16, 2012	Kitt Peak	Spacewatch	·	1.1 km	MPC · JPL
550744	2012 TB_{95}	—	May 8, 2011	Mount Lemmon	Mount Lemmon Survey	·	1.2 km	MPC · JPL
550745	2012 TF_{95}	—	August 20, 2008	Kitt Peak	Spacewatch	·	930 m	MPC · JPL
550746	2012 TJ_{96}	—	September 16, 2012	Kitt Peak	Spacewatch	·	860 m	MPC · JPL
550747	2012 TH_{97}	—	October 8, 2012	Kitt Peak	Spacewatch	·	880 m	MPC · JPL
550748	2012 TJ_{100}	—	September 17, 2012	Črni Vrh	Mikuž, B.	BRG	1.3 km	MPC · JPL
550749	2012 TX_{100}	—	August 28, 2012	Mount Lemmon	Mount Lemmon Survey	·	920 m	MPC · JPL
550750	2012 TM_{101}	—	September 28, 2006	Mount Lemmon	Mount Lemmon Survey	·	2.6 km	MPC · JPL
550751	2012 TQ_{104}	—	October 24, 2005	Kitt Peak	Spacewatch	·	750 m	MPC · JPL
550752	2012 TD_{105}	—	October 2, 1995	Kitt Peak	Spacewatch	·	560 m	MPC · JPL
550753	2012 TL_{106}	—	October 9, 2012	Mount Lemmon	Mount Lemmon Survey	·	1.3 km	MPC · JPL
550754	2012 TG_{107}	—	July 28, 2003	Haleakala	NEAT	EUN	1.7 km	MPC · JPL
550755	2012 TT_{108}	—	April 2, 2011	Mount Lemmon	Mount Lemmon Survey	V	540 m	MPC · JPL
550756	2012 TE_{110}	—	September 21, 2012	Kitt Peak	Spacewatch	(5)	660 m	MPC · JPL
550757	2012 TM_{117}	—	September 16, 2012	Kitt Peak	Spacewatch	·	2.6 km	MPC · JPL
550758	2012 TS_{119}	—	October 1, 2008	Mount Lemmon	Mount Lemmon Survey	(5)	560 m	MPC · JPL
550759	2012 TE_{121}	—	October 8, 2002	Uccle	T. Pauwels	·	650 m	MPC · JPL
550760	2012 TG_{125}	—	September 14, 2012	ESA OGS	ESA OGS	·	2.2 km	MPC · JPL
550761	2012 TT_{125}	—	April 1, 2011	Kitt Peak	Spacewatch	·	810 m	MPC · JPL
550762	2012 TB_{126}	—	October 23, 2005	Catalina	CSS	·	920 m	MPC · JPL
550763	2012 TS_{126}	—	August 24, 2006	Palomar	NEAT	·	3.1 km	MPC · JPL
550764	2012 TX_{126}	—	October 5, 2012	Haleakala	Pan-STARRS 1	·	3.4 km	MPC · JPL
550765	2012 TD_{128}	—	October 7, 2012	Haleakala	Pan-STARRS 1	·	3.5 km	MPC · JPL
550766	2012 TD_{131}	—	August 13, 2006	Palomar	NEAT	TIR	4.0 km	MPC · JPL
550767	2012 TK_{132}	—	September 16, 2012	Kitt Peak	Spacewatch	(5)	710 m	MPC · JPL
550768	2012 TD_{133}	—	March 28, 2008	Mount Lemmon	Mount Lemmon Survey	·	690 m	MPC · JPL
550769	2012 TP_{133}	—	October 5, 2012	Haleakala	Pan-STARRS 1	EOS	1.6 km	MPC · JPL
550770	2012 TD_{134}	—	October 21, 2008	Mount Lemmon	Mount Lemmon Survey	·	990 m	MPC · JPL
550771	2012 TN_{134}	—	May 24, 2011	Nogales	M. Schwartz, P. R. Holvorcem	·	1.3 km	MPC · JPL
550772	2012 TS_{136}	—	May 17, 2005	Mount Lemmon	Mount Lemmon Survey	URS	3.0 km	MPC · JPL
550773	2012 TV_{137}	—	September 26, 2007	Mount Lemmon	Mount Lemmon Survey	EUP	3.1 km	MPC · JPL
550774	2012 TW_{139}	—	August 13, 2006	Palomar	NEAT	H	710 m	MPC · JPL
550775	2012 TJ_{140}	—	March 10, 2011	Mayhill-ISON	L. Elenin	H	650 m	MPC · JPL
550776	2012 TF_{141}	—	April 10, 2005	Kitt Peak	Deep Ecliptic Survey	·	2.1 km	MPC · JPL
550777	2012 TP_{141}	—	September 15, 2004	Kitt Peak	Spacewatch	H	520 m	MPC · JPL
550778	2012 TV_{141}	—	August 25, 2006	Lulin	LUSS	·	2.7 km	MPC · JPL
550779	2012 TS_{145}	—	October 11, 2012	Haleakala	Pan-STARRS 1	·	780 m	MPC · JPL
550780	2012 TL_{150}	—	September 3, 2008	Kitt Peak	Spacewatch	·	1.3 km	MPC · JPL
550781	2012 TE_{152}	—	March 15, 2002	Mount Hamilton	M. W. Buie	·	2.0 km	MPC · JPL
550782	2012 TF_{153}	—	September 11, 2001	Kitt Peak	Spacewatch	THM	2.6 km	MPC · JPL
550783	2012 TC_{156}	—	September 15, 2012	ESA OGS	ESA OGS	·	2.5 km	MPC · JPL
550784	2012 TH_{163}	—	April 8, 2008	Kitt Peak	Spacewatch	·	800 m	MPC · JPL
550785	2012 TT_{163}	—	October 8, 2012	Haleakala	Pan-STARRS 1	(5)	920 m	MPC · JPL
550786	2012 TV_{165}	—	March 12, 2010	Mount Lemmon	Mount Lemmon Survey	·	2.7 km	MPC · JPL
550787	2012 TV_{167}	—	November 2, 2007	Kitt Peak	Spacewatch	·	2.6 km	MPC · JPL
550788	2012 TC_{168}	—	August 10, 2001	Palomar	NEAT	·	2.0 km	MPC · JPL
550789	2012 TL_{175}	—	September 14, 2005	Kitt Peak	Spacewatch	·	690 m	MPC · JPL
550790	2012 TL_{177}	—	August 18, 2006	Kitt Peak	Spacewatch	·	2.7 km	MPC · JPL
550791	2012 TS_{178}	—	December 10, 2009	Mount Lemmon	Mount Lemmon Survey	·	680 m	MPC · JPL
550792	2012 TC_{179}	—	October 9, 2012	Haleakala	Pan-STARRS 1	·	2.4 km	MPC · JPL
550793	2012 TD_{179}	—	March 15, 2004	Kitt Peak	Spacewatch	·	790 m	MPC · JPL
550794	2012 TF_{179}	—	September 16, 2012	Kitt Peak	Spacewatch	EOS	1.7 km	MPC · JPL
550795	2012 TK_{179}	—	November 3, 2007	Kitt Peak	Spacewatch	VER	2.6 km	MPC · JPL
550796	2012 TD_{185}	—	March 11, 2011	Mount Lemmon	Mount Lemmon Survey	(2076)	740 m	MPC · JPL
550797	2012 TG_{185}	—	September 24, 2012	Kitt Peak	Spacewatch	·	1.1 km	MPC · JPL
550798	2012 TE_{186}	—	October 9, 2012	Kitt Peak	Spacewatch	LIX	2.9 km	MPC · JPL
550799	2012 TW_{186}	—	October 9, 2012	Mount Lemmon	Mount Lemmon Survey	·	3.7 km	MPC · JPL
550800	2012 TO_{187}	—	October 9, 2012	Mount Lemmon	Mount Lemmon Survey	·	890 m	MPC · JPL

== 550801–550900 ==
back to top

Designation			Discovery			Properties		Ref
Permanent	Provisional	Named after	Date	Site	Discoverer(s)	Category	Diam.	Ref
550801	2012 TG_{189}	—	September 16, 2012	Kitt Peak	Spacewatch	·	990 m	MPC · JPL
550802	2012 TQ_{191}	—	October 10, 2012	Mount Lemmon	Mount Lemmon Survey	·	3.2 km	MPC · JPL
550803	2012 TA_{192}	—	September 24, 1995	Kitt Peak	Spacewatch	·	2.9 km	MPC · JPL
550804	2012 TU_{192}	—	December 4, 2005	Kitt Peak	Spacewatch	·	1.3 km	MPC · JPL
550805	2012 TZ_{194}	—	September 26, 2012	Mount Lemmon	Mount Lemmon Survey	·	2.9 km	MPC · JPL
550806	2012 TS_{195}	—	September 18, 2006	Goodricke-Pigott	R. A. Tucker	·	4.2 km	MPC · JPL
550807	2012 TX_{196}	—	October 13, 1999	Apache Point	SDSS	·	1.5 km	MPC · JPL
550808	2012 TC_{197}	—	October 10, 2012	Kitt Peak	Spacewatch	·	1.3 km	MPC · JPL
550809	2012 TU_{197}	—	October 10, 2012	Haleakala	Pan-STARRS 1	·	640 m	MPC · JPL
550810	2012 TC_{199}	—	November 30, 2005	Kitt Peak	Spacewatch	NYS	750 m	MPC · JPL
550811	2012 TM_{201}	—	October 1, 2005	Kitt Peak	Spacewatch	·	890 m	MPC · JPL
550812	2012 TR_{202}	—	November 4, 2007	Mount Lemmon	Mount Lemmon Survey	·	2.2 km	MPC · JPL
550813	2012 TX_{206}	—	March 18, 2010	Mount Lemmon	Mount Lemmon Survey	·	3.0 km	MPC · JPL
550814	2012 TD_{208}	—	September 19, 2012	Mount Lemmon	Mount Lemmon Survey	·	650 m	MPC · JPL
550815	2012 TQ_{209}	—	October 11, 2012	Mount Lemmon	Mount Lemmon Survey	·	2.4 km	MPC · JPL
550816	2012 TJ_{210}	—	August 31, 2011	Haleakala	Pan-STARRS 1	L5	7.4 km	MPC · JPL
550817	2012 TS_{211}	—	September 17, 2012	Kitt Peak	Spacewatch	·	1.2 km	MPC · JPL
550818	2012 TS_{213}	—	August 27, 2005	Anderson Mesa	LONEOS	·	830 m	MPC · JPL
550819	2012 TS_{215}	—	October 13, 2012	Les Engarouines	L. Bernasconi	·	1.5 km	MPC · JPL
550820	2012 TX_{216}	—	April 2, 2005	Kitt Peak	Spacewatch	·	3.3 km	MPC · JPL
550821	2012 TQ_{219}	—	September 18, 2012	Kitt Peak	Spacewatch	·	650 m	MPC · JPL
550822	2012 TD_{220}	—	September 18, 2012	Kitt Peak	Spacewatch	·	620 m	MPC · JPL
550823	2012 TA_{222}	—	October 14, 2012	Mount Lemmon	Mount Lemmon Survey	·	2.3 km	MPC · JPL
550824	2012 TB_{222}	—	November 9, 2004	Mauna Kea	Veillet, C.	·	690 m	MPC · JPL
550825	2012 TO_{226}	—	December 27, 2006	Mount Lemmon	Mount Lemmon Survey	·	670 m	MPC · JPL
550826	2012 TU_{230}	—	February 13, 2007	Mount Lemmon	Mount Lemmon Survey	·	730 m	MPC · JPL
550827	2012 TW_{232}	—	October 14, 2001	Palomar	NEAT	·	4.0 km	MPC · JPL
550828	2012 TA_{233}	—	January 31, 2009	Mount Lemmon	Mount Lemmon Survey	·	3.5 km	MPC · JPL
550829	2012 TQ_{233}	—	March 14, 2004	Kitt Peak	Spacewatch	·	740 m	MPC · JPL
550830	2012 TV_{233}	—	August 14, 2001	Powell	Smalley, K.	·	2.5 km	MPC · JPL
550831	2012 TV_{234}	—	October 7, 2012	Haleakala	Pan-STARRS 1	·	1.1 km	MPC · JPL
550832 Silvanacopceski	2012 TZ_{235}	Silvanacopceski	July 7, 2007	Charleston	R. Holmes	·	1.6 km	MPC · JPL
550833	2012 TK_{236}	—	October 16, 2001	Palomar	NEAT	EOS	2.3 km	MPC · JPL
550834	2012 TS_{237}	—	September 20, 2001	Socorro	LINEAR	·	3.3 km	MPC · JPL
550835	2012 TY_{237}	—	October 14, 2001	Apache Point	SDSS Collaboration	·	2.9 km	MPC · JPL
550836	2012 TA_{241}	—	August 28, 2012	Mount Lemmon	Mount Lemmon Survey	·	1.0 km	MPC · JPL
550837	2012 TP_{243}	—	September 23, 2012	Kitt Peak	Spacewatch	·	1.1 km	MPC · JPL
550838	2012 TW_{244}	—	September 17, 2012	Kitt Peak	Spacewatch	·	2.5 km	MPC · JPL
550839	2012 TL_{245}	—	September 21, 2012	Catalina	CSS	·	690 m	MPC · JPL
550840	2012 TB_{254}	—	October 11, 2012	Piszkéstető	K. Sárneczky	·	2.5 km	MPC · JPL
550841	2012 TQ_{258}	—	October 15, 2012	Mount Lemmon	Mount Lemmon Survey	·	620 m	MPC · JPL
550842	2012 TT_{260}	—	September 23, 2008	Mount Lemmon	Mount Lemmon Survey	·	700 m	MPC · JPL
550843	2012 TV_{267}	—	September 15, 2006	Kitt Peak	Spacewatch	·	3.1 km	MPC · JPL
550844	2012 TD_{268}	—	October 9, 2012	Haleakala	Pan-STARRS 1	H	400 m	MPC · JPL
550845	2012 TT_{273}	—	November 7, 2008	Mount Lemmon	Mount Lemmon Survey	·	780 m	MPC · JPL
550846	2012 TW_{274}	—	October 10, 2012	Mount Lemmon	Mount Lemmon Survey	·	2.2 km	MPC · JPL
550847	2012 TW_{276}	—	October 11, 2012	Haleakala	Pan-STARRS 1	V	600 m	MPC · JPL
550848	2012 TN_{279}	—	March 28, 2011	Kitt Peak	Spacewatch	H	300 m	MPC · JPL
550849	2012 TL_{281}	—	October 11, 2012	Mount Lemmon	Mount Lemmon Survey	·	2.4 km	MPC · JPL
550850	2012 TM_{281}	—	August 4, 2003	Kitt Peak	Spacewatch	·	2.1 km	MPC · JPL
550851	2012 TO_{282}	—	January 4, 2003	Kitt Peak	Deep Lens Survey	·	3.0 km	MPC · JPL
550852	2012 TS_{289}	—	September 21, 2003	Palomar	NEAT	·	1.7 km	MPC · JPL
550853	2012 TN_{290}	—	January 28, 2000	Kitt Peak	Spacewatch	·	740 m	MPC · JPL
550854	2012 TQ_{291}	—	October 1, 2005	Catalina	CSS	·	730 m	MPC · JPL
550855	2012 TC_{294}	—	October 14, 2012	Kitt Peak	Spacewatch	·	2.7 km	MPC · JPL
550856	2012 TH_{296}	—	September 30, 2005	Palomar	NEAT	·	970 m	MPC · JPL
550857	2012 TM_{296}	—	September 12, 2001	Kitt Peak	Spacewatch	·	1.1 km	MPC · JPL
550858	2012 TS_{296}	—	October 8, 2012	Mount Lemmon	Mount Lemmon Survey	·	2.8 km	MPC · JPL
550859	2012 TZ_{296}	—	April 13, 2004	Palomar	NEAT	·	3.8 km	MPC · JPL
550860	2012 TM_{297}	—	October 6, 2012	Kitt Peak	Spacewatch	HNS	1.1 km	MPC · JPL
550861	2012 TZ_{298}	—	November 1, 2008	Mount Lemmon	Mount Lemmon Survey	(5)	810 m	MPC · JPL
550862	2012 TD_{301}	—	October 10, 2001	Palomar	NEAT	·	1.4 km	MPC · JPL
550863	2012 TH_{301}	—	August 6, 2005	Palomar	NEAT	·	690 m	MPC · JPL
550864	2012 TK_{302}	—	September 19, 2001	Kitt Peak	Spacewatch	·	1.2 km	MPC · JPL
550865	2012 TX_{302}	—	September 23, 2012	Mayhill-ISON	L. Elenin	·	2.8 km	MPC · JPL
550866	2012 TD_{304}	—	September 23, 2006	San Marcello	San Marcello	VER	3.3 km	MPC · JPL
550867	2012 TZ_{305}	—	September 15, 2012	Kitt Peak	Spacewatch	·	610 m	MPC · JPL
550868	2012 TP_{307}	—	October 10, 2012	Mount Lemmon	Mount Lemmon Survey	·	660 m	MPC · JPL
550869	2012 TR_{307}	—	September 17, 2012	Kitt Peak	Spacewatch	H	440 m	MPC · JPL
550870	2012 TZ_{308}	—	December 8, 2005	Kitt Peak	Spacewatch	NYS	980 m	MPC · JPL
550871	2012 TO_{309}	—	August 17, 2006	Palomar	NEAT	·	3.0 km	MPC · JPL
550872	2012 TZ_{309}	—	September 30, 2006	Catalina	CSS	·	4.0 km	MPC · JPL
550873	2012 TJ_{310}	—	September 19, 1998	Apache Point	SDSS Collaboration	·	990 m	MPC · JPL
550874	2012 TJ_{311}	—	October 19, 2001	Anderson Mesa	LONEOS	·	1.4 km	MPC · JPL
550875	2012 TE_{312}	—	September 19, 2006	Catalina	CSS	·	3.7 km	MPC · JPL
550876	2012 TH_{312}	—	March 11, 2007	Kitt Peak	Spacewatch	·	1.2 km	MPC · JPL
550877	2012 TU_{313}	—	October 22, 2001	Palomar	NEAT	TIR	3.5 km	MPC · JPL
550878	2012 TS_{314}	—	October 20, 2003	Palomar	NEAT	·	2.5 km	MPC · JPL
550879	2012 TO_{318}	—	July 28, 2005	Palomar	NEAT	·	710 m	MPC · JPL
550880	2012 TY_{318}	—	September 17, 2012	Nogales	M. Schwartz, P. R. Holvorcem	·	1.1 km	MPC · JPL
550881	2012 TV_{320}	—	October 13, 2012	Catalina	CSS	H	480 m	MPC · JPL
550882	2012 TA_{321}	—	September 13, 2012	Kislovodsk	ISON-Kislovodsk Observatory	EUN	1.2 km	MPC · JPL
550883	2012 TG_{321}	—	October 15, 2012	Catalina	CSS	ADE	2.0 km	MPC · JPL
550884	2012 TB_{323}	—	October 9, 2012	Haleakala	Pan-STARRS 1	·	2.4 km	MPC · JPL
550885	2012 TJ_{327}	—	October 8, 2012	Haleakala	Pan-STARRS 1	·	2.9 km	MPC · JPL
550886	2012 TS_{327}	—	August 4, 2003	Kitt Peak	Spacewatch	·	1.2 km	MPC · JPL
550887	2012 TV_{329}	—	September 5, 2000	Apache Point	SDSS Collaboration	·	2.3 km	MPC · JPL
550888	2012 TV_{330}	—	October 11, 2012	Kitt Peak	Spacewatch	·	660 m	MPC · JPL
550889	2012 TX_{330}	—	December 1, 2005	Mount Lemmon	Mount Lemmon Survey	·	960 m	MPC · JPL
550890	2012 TZ_{331}	—	October 6, 2012	Haleakala	Pan-STARRS 1	·	1.3 km	MPC · JPL
550891	2012 TT_{338}	—	October 4, 2016	Mount Lemmon	Mount Lemmon Survey	·	1.1 km	MPC · JPL
550892	2012 TJ_{343}	—	October 26, 2013	Mount Lemmon	Mount Lemmon Survey	·	3.6 km	MPC · JPL
550893	2012 TX_{343}	—	December 21, 2014	Mount Lemmon	Mount Lemmon Survey	·	3.2 km	MPC · JPL
550894	2012 TO_{350}	—	January 1, 2014	Kitt Peak	Spacewatch	MAR	690 m	MPC · JPL
550895	2012 TR_{358}	—	October 8, 2012	Kitt Peak	Spacewatch	MAS	540 m	MPC · JPL
550896	2012 TV_{365}	—	October 5, 2012	Haleakala	Pan-STARRS 1	·	2.6 km	MPC · JPL
550897	2012 UZ_{1}	—	September 18, 2012	Kitt Peak	Spacewatch	·	1.1 km	MPC · JPL
550898	2012 UO_{2}	—	November 5, 2005	Catalina	CSS	V	680 m	MPC · JPL
550899	2012 UG_{4}	—	July 29, 2005	Palomar	NEAT	·	810 m	MPC · JPL
550900	2012 US_{4}	—	October 7, 2012	Haleakala	Pan-STARRS 1	·	560 m	MPC · JPL

== 550901–551000 ==
back to top

Designation			Discovery			Properties		Ref
Permanent	Provisional	Named after	Date	Site	Discoverer(s)	Category	Diam.	Ref
550901	2012 UC_{6}	—	April 6, 2008	Mount Lemmon	Mount Lemmon Survey	·	510 m	MPC · JPL
550902	2012 UG_{6}	—	October 24, 2007	Mount Lemmon	Mount Lemmon Survey	·	4.1 km	MPC · JPL
550903	2012 UN_{7}	—	October 16, 2012	Mount Lemmon	Mount Lemmon Survey	·	2.6 km	MPC · JPL
550904	2012 UV_{7}	—	August 24, 2005	Palomar	NEAT	·	660 m	MPC · JPL
550905	2012 US_{12}	—	October 8, 2012	Mount Lemmon	Mount Lemmon Survey	·	880 m	MPC · JPL
550906	2012 UP_{14}	—	October 8, 2012	Haleakala	Pan-STARRS 1	(2076)	730 m	MPC · JPL
550907	2012 UP_{19}	—	October 8, 2012	Haleakala	Pan-STARRS 1	·	720 m	MPC · JPL
550908	2012 UQ_{20}	—	October 27, 2008	Kitt Peak	Spacewatch	(5)	900 m	MPC · JPL
550909	2012 UG_{23}	—	October 17, 2012	Mount Lemmon	Mount Lemmon Survey	·	1.5 km	MPC · JPL
550910	2012 UP_{23}	—	October 17, 2012	Mount Lemmon	Mount Lemmon Survey	·	1.4 km	MPC · JPL
550911	2012 UV_{23}	—	November 17, 2007	Kitt Peak	Spacewatch	·	2.9 km	MPC · JPL
550912	2012 UK_{25}	—	October 8, 2012	Catalina	CSS	·	810 m	MPC · JPL
550913	2012 UJ_{26}	—	October 17, 2012	Mount Lemmon	Mount Lemmon Survey	·	2.6 km	MPC · JPL
550914	2012 UO_{26}	—	September 21, 2012	Mount Lemmon	Mount Lemmon Survey	·	640 m	MPC · JPL
550915	2012 UH_{27}	—	October 10, 2012	Mount Lemmon	Mount Lemmon Survey	·	1.3 km	MPC · JPL
550916	2012 UN_{34}	—	October 20, 2012	Mount Lemmon	Mount Lemmon Survey	L4	10 km	MPC · JPL
550917	2012 UU_{34}	—	July 18, 2001	Palomar	NEAT	·	1.1 km	MPC · JPL
550918	2012 UJ_{35}	—	October 3, 2006	Mount Lemmon	Mount Lemmon Survey	VER	2.8 km	MPC · JPL
550919	2012 UC_{40}	—	November 19, 2007	Kitt Peak	Spacewatch	THM	2.1 km	MPC · JPL
550920	2012 UD_{40}	—	March 9, 2007	Mount Lemmon	Mount Lemmon Survey	·	550 m	MPC · JPL
550921	2012 UQ_{40}	—	September 25, 2001	Bohyunsan	Bohyunsan	·	1.1 km	MPC · JPL
550922	2012 UH_{44}	—	October 18, 2012	Mount Lemmon	Mount Lemmon Survey	·	3.1 km	MPC · JPL
550923	2012 UP_{44}	—	October 18, 2012	Mount Lemmon	Mount Lemmon Survey	·	3.7 km	MPC · JPL
550924	2012 UO_{47}	—	April 10, 2005	Mount Lemmon	Mount Lemmon Survey	·	2.7 km	MPC · JPL
550925	2012 UB_{50}	—	May 14, 2009	Mount Lemmon	Mount Lemmon Survey	·	4.0 km	MPC · JPL
550926	2012 UC_{50}	—	March 15, 2011	Mount Lemmon	Mount Lemmon Survey	H	500 m	MPC · JPL
550927	2012 UL_{50}	—	November 3, 2005	Catalina	CSS	·	890 m	MPC · JPL
550928	2012 UY_{52}	—	September 28, 2006	Catalina	CSS	·	4.0 km	MPC · JPL
550929	2012 UC_{53}	—	October 30, 2007	Mount Lemmon	Mount Lemmon Survey	H	340 m	MPC · JPL
550930	2012 UT_{54}	—	October 19, 2012	Haleakala	Pan-STARRS 1	·	3.2 km	MPC · JPL
550931	2012 UH_{55}	—	October 19, 2012	Haleakala	Pan-STARRS 1	·	1.4 km	MPC · JPL
550932	2012 UR_{55}	—	October 19, 2012	Haleakala	Pan-STARRS 1	·	900 m	MPC · JPL
550933	2012 UW_{55}	—	October 19, 2012	Haleakala	Pan-STARRS 1	·	920 m	MPC · JPL
550934	2012 UK_{57}	—	July 28, 2011	Palomar	Palomar Transient Factory	·	2.0 km	MPC · JPL
550935	2012 UE_{58}	—	November 20, 2008	Kitt Peak	Spacewatch	(5)	870 m	MPC · JPL
550936	2012 UR_{58}	—	October 19, 2012	Haleakala	Pan-STARRS 1	V	550 m	MPC · JPL
550937	2012 UK_{61}	—	October 19, 2012	Haleakala	Pan-STARRS 1	H	380 m	MPC · JPL
550938	2012 UO_{61}	—	October 20, 2012	Haleakala	Pan-STARRS 1	H	350 m	MPC · JPL
550939	2012 UC_{62}	—	September 23, 2012	Mount Lemmon	Mount Lemmon Survey	·	1.3 km	MPC · JPL
550940	2012 UM_{62}	—	December 1, 2005	Kitt Peak	Spacewatch	·	880 m	MPC · JPL
550941	2012 UQ_{62}	—	November 19, 2006	Kitt Peak	Spacewatch	·	3.8 km	MPC · JPL
550942 Kurtág	2012 UN_{67}	Kurtág	October 20, 2012	Piszkéstető	K. Sárneczky, A. Király	·	3.1 km	MPC · JPL
550943	2012 UA_{68}	—	October 11, 2012	Haleakala	Pan-STARRS 1	H	480 m	MPC · JPL
550944	2012 US_{70}	—	September 3, 2002	Palomar	NEAT	·	810 m	MPC · JPL
550945	2012 UJ_{71}	—	March 18, 2010	Kitt Peak	Spacewatch	·	2.3 km	MPC · JPL
550946	2012 UL_{72}	—	March 5, 2006	Kitt Peak	Spacewatch	·	1.3 km	MPC · JPL
550947	2012 UW_{72}	—	October 17, 2012	Haleakala	Pan-STARRS 1	·	810 m	MPC · JPL
550948	2012 UD_{74}	—	October 23, 2008	Kitt Peak	Spacewatch	·	1.0 km	MPC · JPL
550949	2012 UW_{75}	—	October 8, 2012	Mount Lemmon	Mount Lemmon Survey	MAS	560 m	MPC · JPL
550950	2012 UT_{76}	—	January 5, 2006	Kitt Peak	Spacewatch	MAS	500 m	MPC · JPL
550951	2012 UW_{77}	—	August 21, 2001	Palomar	NEAT	·	3.6 km	MPC · JPL
550952	2012 UG_{80}	—	October 10, 2012	Kitt Peak	Spacewatch	·	1.7 km	MPC · JPL
550953	2012 UG_{84}	—	April 10, 2010	Kitt Peak	Spacewatch	·	3.9 km	MPC · JPL
550954	2012 UU_{90}	—	May 4, 2005	Mauna Kea	Veillet, C.	THM	1.9 km	MPC · JPL
550955	2012 UL_{92}	—	August 22, 2003	Palomar	NEAT	·	1.4 km	MPC · JPL
550956	2012 UK_{93}	—	November 2, 2005	Mount Lemmon	Mount Lemmon Survey	V	710 m	MPC · JPL
550957	2012 UM_{93}	—	November 19, 2009	Kitt Peak	Spacewatch	·	710 m	MPC · JPL
550958	2012 UP_{95}	—	October 30, 2008	Kitt Peak	Spacewatch	(5)	650 m	MPC · JPL
550959	2012 UF_{100}	—	November 3, 2008	Kitt Peak	Spacewatch	·	860 m	MPC · JPL
550960	2012 UU_{100}	—	November 6, 2008	Mount Lemmon	Mount Lemmon Survey	·	1.1 km	MPC · JPL
550961	2012 UP_{104}	—	May 24, 2011	Haleakala	Pan-STARRS 1	·	1.5 km	MPC · JPL
550962	2012 UC_{105}	—	January 10, 2003	Palomar	NEAT	·	3.2 km	MPC · JPL
550963	2012 UX_{113}	—	October 22, 2012	Mount Lemmon	Mount Lemmon Survey	·	1.9 km	MPC · JPL
550964	2012 UZ_{115}	—	September 17, 2012	Kitt Peak	Spacewatch	·	710 m	MPC · JPL
550965	2012 UT_{117}	—	September 16, 2012	Kitt Peak	Spacewatch	·	2.5 km	MPC · JPL
550966	2012 UW_{117}	—	December 1, 2007	Bisei	BATTeRS	·	2.9 km	MPC · JPL
550967	2012 UW_{120}	—	April 9, 2003	Palomar	NEAT	V	710 m	MPC · JPL
550968	2012 UU_{122}	—	July 28, 2005	Palomar	NEAT	·	570 m	MPC · JPL
550969	2012 UB_{123}	—	September 29, 2005	Mount Lemmon	Mount Lemmon Survey	·	670 m	MPC · JPL
550970	2012 UC_{123}	—	January 30, 2006	Kitt Peak	Spacewatch	NYS	860 m	MPC · JPL
550971	2012 US_{123}	—	November 9, 2001	Kitt Peak	Spacewatch	·	910 m	MPC · JPL
550972	2012 UG_{125}	—	April 7, 2007	Mount Lemmon	Mount Lemmon Survey	·	1.3 km	MPC · JPL
550973	2012 UU_{125}	—	October 22, 2012	Haleakala	Pan-STARRS 1	·	1.5 km	MPC · JPL
550974	2012 UN_{128}	—	October 18, 2012	Mount Lemmon	Mount Lemmon Survey	·	3.7 km	MPC · JPL
550975	2012 UG_{134}	—	September 26, 2012	Nogales	M. Schwartz, P. R. Holvorcem	·	1.3 km	MPC · JPL
550976	2012 UP_{134}	—	October 19, 2012	Mount Lemmon	Mount Lemmon Survey	·	1.4 km	MPC · JPL
550977	2012 UT_{134}	—	October 19, 2012	Haleakala	Pan-STARRS 1	H	430 m	MPC · JPL
550978	2012 UU_{134}	—	October 6, 2012	Haleakala	Pan-STARRS 1	EOS	2.0 km	MPC · JPL
550979	2012 UU_{135}	—	October 6, 2012	Haleakala	Pan-STARRS 1	·	4.5 km	MPC · JPL
550980	2012 UU_{137}	—	October 23, 2012	Kitt Peak	Spacewatch	·	1.0 km	MPC · JPL
550981	2012 UW_{137}	—	December 31, 2008	Mount Lemmon	Mount Lemmon Survey	·	1.0 km	MPC · JPL
550982	2012 UL_{138}	—	October 14, 2012	ASC-Kislovodsk	Nevski, V., Zeloyniy, O.	H	590 m	MPC · JPL
550983	2012 UL_{141}	—	March 25, 2010	Kitt Peak	Spacewatch	·	2.4 km	MPC · JPL
550984	2012 UP_{141}	—	April 13, 2011	Mount Lemmon	Mount Lemmon Survey	V	550 m	MPC · JPL
550985	2012 UN_{142}	—	April 20, 2010	Mount Lemmon	Mount Lemmon Survey	·	1.3 km	MPC · JPL
550986	2012 UQ_{142}	—	October 28, 2008	Kitt Peak	Spacewatch	·	870 m	MPC · JPL
550987	2012 UR_{142}	—	November 18, 2007	Mount Lemmon	Mount Lemmon Survey	·	2.2 km	MPC · JPL
550988	2012 UA_{146}	—	January 22, 2006	Mount Lemmon	Mount Lemmon Survey	EUN	1.3 km	MPC · JPL
550989	2012 UK_{147}	—	June 5, 2011	Mount Lemmon	Mount Lemmon Survey	·	1.5 km	MPC · JPL
550990	2012 UK_{148}	—	September 18, 2001	Apache Point	SDSS Collaboration	·	1.0 km	MPC · JPL
550991	2012 UU_{149}	—	August 28, 2012	Mount Lemmon	Mount Lemmon Survey	·	1.2 km	MPC · JPL
550992	2012 UN_{155}	—	April 1, 2003	Kitt Peak	Deep Ecliptic Survey	·	1 km	MPC · JPL
550993	2012 UR_{159}	—	March 11, 2003	Palomar	NEAT	V	830 m	MPC · JPL
550994	2012 UQ_{161}	—	September 28, 2006	Kitt Peak	Spacewatch	·	2.9 km	MPC · JPL
550995	2012 UN_{165}	—	October 5, 2000	Kitt Peak	Spacewatch	·	3.9 km	MPC · JPL
550996	2012 UH_{167}	—	December 29, 2005	Kitt Peak	Spacewatch	·	1.0 km	MPC · JPL
550997	2012 UO_{168}	—	October 9, 2012	Mayhill-ISON	L. Elenin	·	1.3 km	MPC · JPL
550998	2012 UY_{168}	—	September 25, 2008	Mount Lemmon	Mount Lemmon Survey	·	1.2 km	MPC · JPL
550999	2012 UA_{169}	—	October 6, 2012	Haleakala	Pan-STARRS 1	PHO	930 m	MPC · JPL
551000	2012 UQ_{169}	—	May 29, 2003	Cerro Tololo	Deep Ecliptic Survey	TIR	2.6 km	MPC · JPL

back to top

== Meaning of names ==
As minor planet discoveries are confirmed, they are given a permanent number by the IAU's Minor Planet Center (MPC), and the discoverers can then submit names for them, following the IAU's naming conventions. The list below concerns those minor planets in the specified number-range that have received names, and explains the meanings of those names.

Official naming citations of newly named small Solar System bodies are approved and published in a bulletin by IAU's Working Group for Small Bodies Nomenclature (WGSBN). Before May 2021, citations were published in MPC's Minor Planet Circulars for many decades. Recent citations can also be found on the JPL Small-Body Database (SBDB). Until his death in 2016, German astronomer Lutz D. Schmadel compiled these citations into the Dictionary of Minor Planet Names (DMP) and regularly updated the collection.

Based on Paul Herget's The Names of the Minor Planets, Schmadel also researched the unclear origin of numerous asteroids, most of which had been named prior to World War II. This article incorporates text from this source, which is in the public domain: SBDB New namings may only be added to this list below after official publication as the preannouncement of names is condemned. The WGSBN publishes a comprehensive guideline for the naming rules of non-cometary small Solar System bodies.

Named minor planet	Provisional	This minor planet was named for...	Ref · Catalog
550034 Reitsam	2011 YA_{4}	Robert Reitsam, German engineer and planetary observer.	IAU · 550034
550083 Szécsényi-Nagy	2011 YL_{85}	Gábor Szécsényi-Nagy (1948–2012), a Hungarian astronomer, professor at Eötvös Loránd University.	IAU · 550083
550139 Venn	2012 BF_{53}	Kim Venn (born 1965), Canadian astronomer at the Department of Physics and Astronomy of the University of Victoria.	IAU · 550139
550525 Sigourneyweaver	2012 NL	Sigourney Weaver (born 1949), an American actress who is best known for her lead role as "Ripley" in the Alien franchise.	IAU · 550525
550666 Difrancesco	2012 SJ_{55}	James DiFrancesco (born 1968), Canadian astrophysicist at the Herzberg Astronomy and Astrophysics Research Centre (National Research Council of Canada).	IAU · 550666
550832 Silvanacopceski	2012 TZ_{235}	Silvana Copceski (b. 1976), the coordinator of the asteroid search program in Brazil.	IAU · 550832
550942 Kurtág	2012 UN_{67}	György Kurtág (b. 1926), a Hungarian classical composer, pianist and teacher of chamber music.	IAU · 550942
