= Kim Venn =

Canadian physicist and astronomer

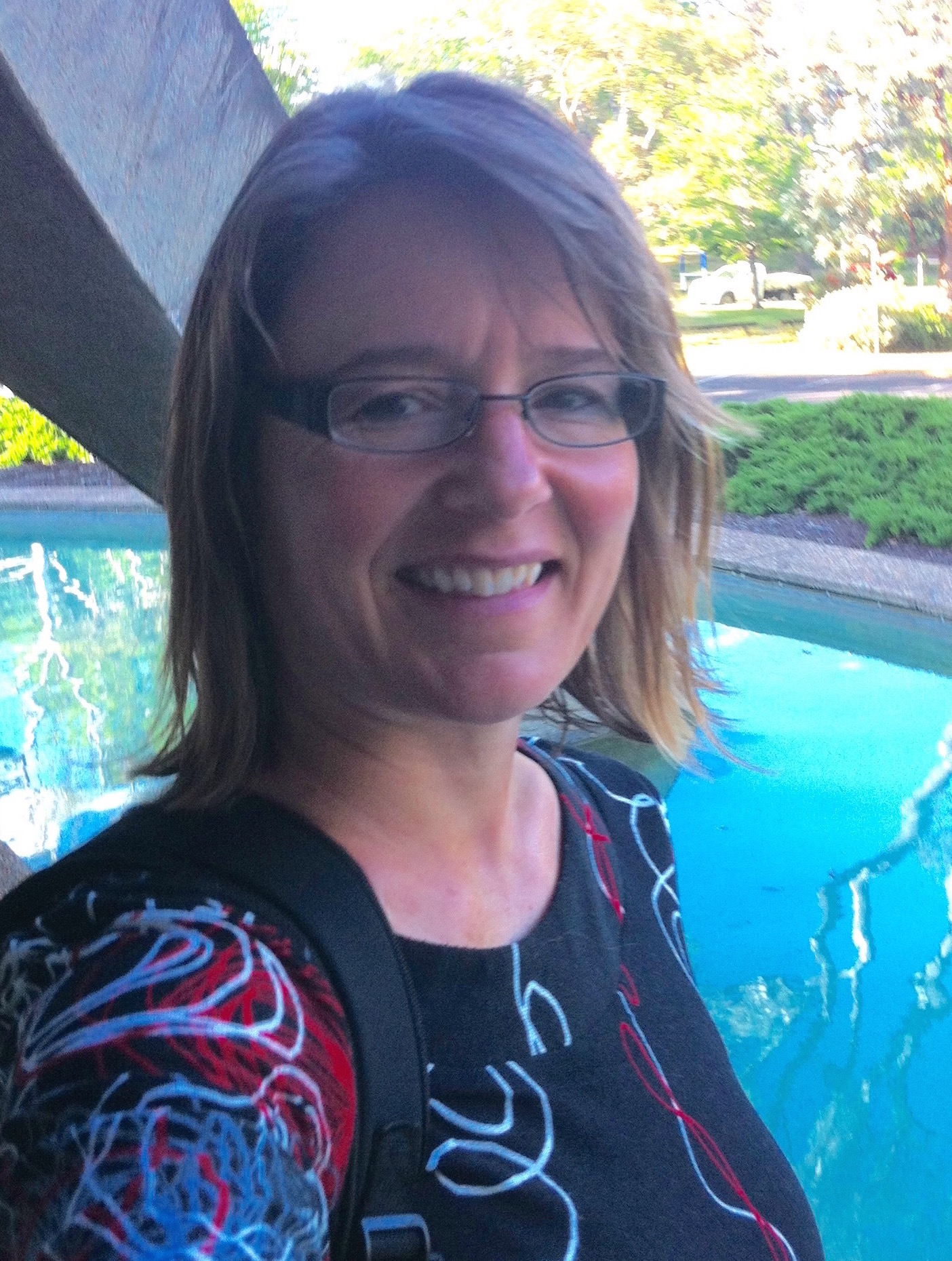
- Born: Toronto, Canada
- Awards: Presidential Early Career Award for Scientists and Engineers (2000) Clare Booth Luce Professorship (1995-2005) Canada Research Chair (Tier II, 2005-2015) UVic Reach Award for Research Partnerships (2018)

Academic background
- Education: University of Toronto; University of Texas at Austin

Academic work
- Discipline: Astronomy
- Institutions: Macalester College; Institute of Astronomy, Cambridge; University of Victoria
- Main interests: Stellar Spectroscopy; Local Group Galaxies; Origin of the Elements
- Website: www.astro.uvic.ca/~venn

Kim A. Venn is a professor of physics and astronomy at the University of Victoria, Canada, and director of the university's Astronomy Research Centre. She researches the chemo-dynamical analysis of stars in the galaxy and its nearby dwarf satellites.

== Early life and career ==
Venn was born and raised in Toronto, Canada, where she completed her BSc in Physics & Astronomy at the University of Toronto in 1987. She then received her PhD in Astronomy from the University of Texas at Austin in 1994 working with Christopher Sneden and David L. Lambert on the evolution of massive stars, and pursued postdoctoral research at the Max Planck Institute for Astrophysics/Universitäts-Sternwarte_München working with Rolf-Peter Kudritzki on the properties of massive stars in the Magellanic Clouds and other Local Group dwarf irregular galaxies.

She held a Clare Boothe Luce Professorship in Physics & Astronomy at Macalester College from 1996 to 2004, then moved to the University of Victoria in 2005 as a Canada Research Chair (Tier II) in Observational Astrophysics and Professor of Physics & Astronomy. She has served on numerous science advisory, time allocation, and funding committees, including the Thirty Meter Telescope Board of Governors as a representative for Canada (2018–2022).

In 2017, she led a team of Canadian researchers in developing a Natural Sciences and Engineering Research Council CREATE training program in New Technologies for Canadian Observatories, a program to help prepare students for leadership positions in Canadian astronomy and high-tech industry.

== Research ==
Venn is a specialist in observational stellar spectroscopy, and the chemo-dynamical analysis of stars in the Galaxy and its nearby dwarf satellites. She also has an interest in new astronomical techniques, ranging from new instruments for multi-object spectroscopy or adaptive optics, to new data analysis methods, such as machine learning applications for spectroscopic surveys. In her work, Venn has used data from the largest ground-based telescopes, including the Very Large Telescope, the Magellan Telescopes, the Subaru Telescope, the Gemini Observatory, and the Canada-France-Hawaii Telescope, as well as space-based telescopes such as the Hubble Space Telescope and the ESO Gaia mission.

== Recognition and awards ==
Venn won the Presidential Early Career Award for Scientists and Engineers (PECASE, 2000), and the UVic Reach Award for Excellence in Research Partnerships (2018) with Prof. Colin Bradley, Dr. David Andersen, and Dr. Olivier Lardiere, for their work on the RAVEN MOAO science demonstrator

Venn was interviewed on CBC Radio's All Points West (17 October 2019) about her work on the oldest, most metal-poor stars, and on CBC Radio's North By Northwest (6 February 2022) on her team's discovery of C-19, the remnant of the most metal-poor star cluster yet found. The research was carried out with the Pristine collaboration.

== Publications ==
Venn's most cited and most recent peer-review publications include:

- "Stellar Chemical Signatures and Hierarchical Galaxy Formation", appeared in the Astronomical Journal, 2004
- "The Pristine survey IV: approaching the Galactic metallicity floor with the discovery of an ultra-metal-poor star" appeared in Monthly Notices of the Royal Astronomical Society, 2018
- "The Pristine survey - IX. CFHT ESPaDOnS spectroscopic analysis of 115 bright metal-poor candidate stars", appeared in Monthly Notices of the Royal Astronomical Society, 2020
- "A stellar stream remnant of a globular cluster below the metallicity floor", appeared in Nature, 2022

== Affiliations ==
Venn is an active member of CASCA (Canadian Astronomical Society), currently serving on the CASCA/ACURA TMT Advisory Committee, and formerly on the Mid-Term Review of the Long Range Plan (2015), and as Chair of the Awards committee (2007–2011). She is currently the Chair of the ACURA (Association of Canadian Universities for Research in Astronomy) Board, and she is a member of the IAU
