= Richard Scrope =

Richard Scrope may refer to:

- Richard Scrope, 1st Baron Scrope of Bolton (c. 1327–1403), English soldier and courtier, builder of Bolton Castle
- Richard Scrope (bishop) (c. 1350–1405), Archbishop of York
- Richard Scrope, 3rd Baron Scrope of Bolton (1394–1420)

== See also ==
- Richard Scroope (died 1468), Bishop of Carlisle
