= Percy Robert Diggle =

British Lions international rugby union player

- Born: Percy Robert Diggle; 27 November 1887 London, England
- Died: 1977 (aged 89–90)
- School: Marlborough College

Rugby union career
- Position: Forward
Amateur team(s)
Years	Team	Apps	(Points)
1907-	Oxford University		
1910-	Cumberland		
International career
Years	Team	Apps	(Points)
1910	Combined British	1	

Percy Robert Diggle was an English sportsman who played rugby union at an international level, touring Argentina with the 1910 Combined British rugby union side, an early incarnation of the British and Irish Lions.

== Early life ==
Percy Robert Diggle was born on 27 November 1887, the son of the Venerable Archdeacon, the Right Reverend John William Diggle, who would later become the Bishop of Carlisle and his second wife Edith Moss, (the daughter of Gilbert Winter Moss and Eliza Seilliere Zwilchenbart whom he married on 23 April 1884). He attended Marlborough College where he featured as captain of the School's second fifteen rugby squad, though he did not play in the first fifteen. He went on to Oxford University where he received his blue for rugby.

== Rugby union ==
Diggle played rugby at school, though did not feature in the first choice fifteen. However, he did represent Oxford University. He went on to represent his home county of Cumberland and although he was never selected to play rugby for England, he was selected to tour with the Combined British on the 1910 tour to Argentina where he played in what Argentina count as their first test match.

== Career and later life ==
In 1911 Diggle was listed as a member of the Inner Temple and by 1938 listed his occupation as the director of a company. In 1923 he married Edwina Margery Stead who was 13 years his junior. The couple lived in Penrith. He died in 1977, his death being registered in Kendal.
