= Gregory of Caergwent =

British monk and historian

Gregory of Caergwent (or Caerwent) or Winchester (modern Welsh: Caerwynt) (fl. 1270) was a British monk and historian. Gregory entered Gloucester Abbey, according to his own account, on 29 October 1237, and is stated to have lived there for sixty years. He wrote the annals of his monastery from the year 682 to 1290, a work which has only survived in an epitome made by Lawrence Nowell. It consists almost entirely of obituaries and of notices relating to events which concerned his own monastery or the town of Gloucester; but in the early part it includes matter which is not contained in the Historia S. Petri Gloucestriæ, printed in the Rolls Series. His compilation is thought to have been a source for Walter Froucester's later revision of the Gloucester chronicle.

A Gregory of Karewent was dean of the arches in 1279; for the same year the livings of Tetbury, Gloucestershire, and Blockley, Worcestershire, are mentioned as vacant through the death of Gregory de Kerewent. A Philip de Kayrwent was prior of Gloucester in 1284, and Richard de Kayrwent was infirmarer in 1275 and 1284. Gregory has also been supposed to be the author of the Metrical Life of St. Hugh of Lincoln; but this is scarcely probable, since that poem appears to have been written before 1235. The Laudian MS., however, seems to contain a later edition, and ascribes the poem to a Gregory who had dedicated it to a bishop of Winchester, and it is therefore possible that the writer may have been the reviser of the older poem.
