= Owen Oglethorp =

Owen Oglethorp may refer to:

- Owen Oglethorpe, bishop
- Owen Oglethorp (MP) for Chipping Wycombe (UK Parliament constituency)
