= John de Horncastle =

John de Horncastle may refer to:

- John Horncastle, bishop
- John de Horncastle (MP) for Bristol (UK Parliament constituency)
