= Abbot of Gloucester =

List of medieval abbots of Gloucester Abbey in England

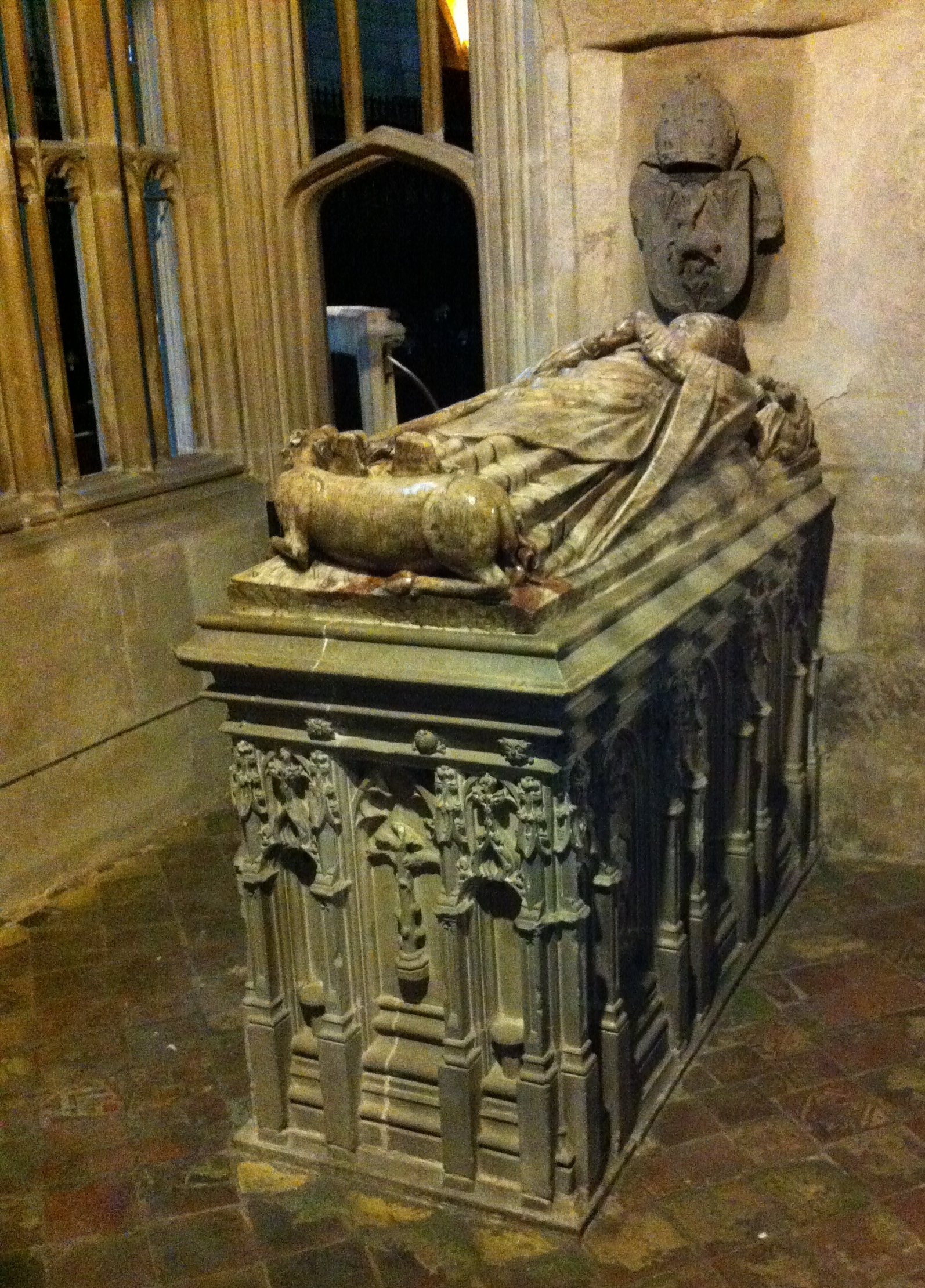
Memorial to Abbot William Malvern in Gloucester Cathedral

The Abbot of Gloucester was the title of the head of Gloucester Abbey in Gloucester, England.

The Benedictine abbey was founded about 1022 and was dedicated to Saint Peter. It is recorded that the abbey lost about a quarter of its complement of monks in 1377 due to the Black Death.

In 1540, the abbey was dissolved by King Henry VIII, and it became Gloucester Cathedral the following year.

List of abbots of Gloucester
Name	Dates	Notes
Eadric	1022–1058	also known as Edric
Wulfstan	1058–1072	also known as Wilstan; died on pilgrimage to Jerusalem; related to Aldred, Archbishop of York.
Serlo	1072–1104	
Peter	1107–1113	
William Godemon	1113–1130	
Walter de Lacy	1130–1139	
Gilbert Foliot	1139–1148	afterwards Bishop of Hereford (1148–1163) and Bishop of London (1163–1187).
Hamelin	1148–1179	
Thomas Carbonel	1179–1205	
Henry Blont	1205–1224	also known as Henry Blunt
Thomas of Bredon	1223–1228	
Henry Foliot	1228–1243	
John de Felda	1243–1263	
Reginald de Homme	1263–1284	
John de Gamages	1284–1306	
John Thoky	1306–1328	
John Wygmore	1328–1337	
Adam of Staunton	1337–1351	
Thomas Horton	1351–1377	
John Boyfeld	1377–1381	
Walter Froucester	1381–1412	
Hugh of Morton	1412–1420	
John Morwent	1420–1437	
Reginald Boulers	1437–1450	afterwards Bishop of Hereford (1450–1453) and Bishop of Coventry and Lichfield (1453–1459).
Thomas Sebroke	1450–1457	
Richard Hauley	1457–1472	
William Farley	1472–1498	
John Malvern	1498–1500	
Thomas Braunche	1500–1510	
John Newton	1510–1514	
William Parker or Malvern	1514–1539	
