= William Laud =

Archbishop of Canterbury from 1633 to 1645

The Most Reverend and Right Honourable William Laud
- Archbishop of Canterbury
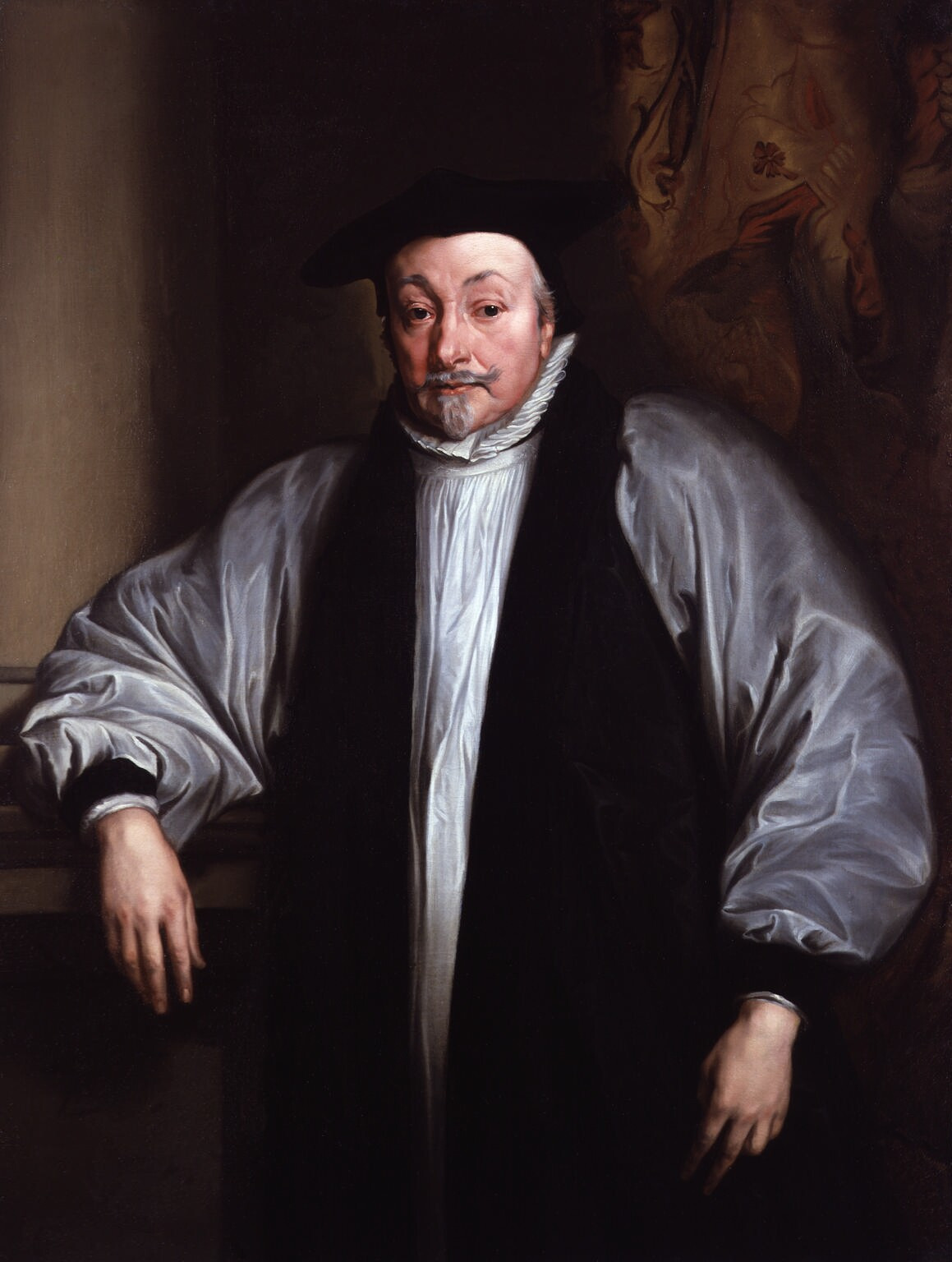
- Portrait by Anthony van Dyck c. 1636
- Church: Church of England
- Diocese: Canterbury
- In office: 1633–1645
- Predecessor: George Abbot
- Successor: William Juxon

Orders
- Ordination: 5 April 1601
- Consecration: 18 November 1621 by George Montaigne

Personal details
- Born: 7 October 1573 Reading, Berkshire, England
- Died: 10 January 1645 (aged 71) Tower Hill, London, England
- Buried: St John's College, Oxford
- Parents: William Laud; Lucy Webbe
- Education: Reading School
- Alma mater: St John's College, Oxford

Sainthood
- Feast day: 10 January
- Venerated in: Anglican Communion

William Laud (Note: Pronounced /ˈlɔːd/ LAWD) (7 October 1573 – 10 January 1645) was a bishop in the Church of England. Appointed Archbishop of Canterbury by Charles I in 1633, Laud was a key advocate of Charles I's religious reforms. He was arrested by Parliament in 1640 and executed towards the end of the First English Civil War in January 1645.

Laud believed in episcopalianism, or rule by bishops. "Laudianism" was a reform movement that emphasised liturgical ceremony and clerical hierarchy, enforcing uniformity within the Church of England, as outlined by Charles. Its often highly ritualistic aspects prefigure what are now known as high church views.

In theology, Laud was accused of Arminianism, covertly favouring Roman Catholic doctrines, and opposing Calvinism. On all three grounds, he was regarded by Puritan clerics and laymen as a dangerous opponent. His use of the court of Star Chamber to persecute opponents such as William Prynne made him deeply unpopular.

== Early life ==
Laud was born at Reading, Berkshire, on 7 October 1573, the only son of William Laud, a clothier, and Lucy, born Webbe, widow of John Robinson, another clothier of the town, and sister of Sir William Webbe, Lord Mayor of London. He was educated at Reading School and on 17 October 1589 matriculated to St John's College, Oxford, where he was taught by Thomas Holland. In 1593 he became a fellow of the college. He graduated as Bachelor of Arts in 1594, Master of Arts in 1598 and Doctor of Divinity in 1608. When Laud was going through his exercises as a candidate for the degree of Bachelor in Divinity, in 1604, he contended "that there could be no true churches without diocesan episcopacy". For this the young aspirant was sharply and publicly rebuked by Holland, who presided on the occasion; and who severely reprehended the future Primate of All England as "one who sought to sow discord among brethren, and between the Church of England and the Reformed Churches abroad". While he was an undergraduate, Laud's tutor was John Buckeridge, who became president of St John's College in 1605.

Laud was ordained deacon on 4 January 1601 and priest on 5 April the same year. On 4 May 1603, he was one of the university proctors for the year.

== Under James I ==
When Buckeridge left St John's in 1611, Laud succeeded him as president, but only after a hard patronage struggle reaching high circles at court. The rival candidate, John Rawlinson, was chaplain to Lord Ellesmere, who was both chancellor of the university and Lord Chancellor of England. Laud was chaplain to Richard Neile, who was Clerk of the Closet. Eventually, King James brushed aside irregularities in the election, settling matters in Laud's favour.

Laud became Dean of Gloucester in 1616. At Gloucester Cathedral he began ceremonial innovations with the communion table. By local custom, the table stood in the middle of the choir, as was then usual in a parish church, rather than at the east end as was typical of cathedrals. Laud believed he had the king's blessing to renovate and improve the run-down building, but he offended his bishop, Miles Smith.

Neile was Laud's consistent patron. Neile sought, but could not obtain, Laud's appointment as Dean of Westminster, a post that John Williams retained. But at the end of 1621, and despite the king's view of Laud as a troublemaker, Laud received the relatively unimportant see of St Davids.

Laud became a confidant of George Villiers, 1st Duke of Buckingham, at the end of the reign. The Buckingham household employed John Percy (alias Fisher), a Jesuit, as chaplain, and the king wished to counter well-founded rumours that Percy was making Catholic converts there. In a three-day series of private debates with Percy in 1622, Laud was introduced to argue the Protestant case on the final day; pamphlets followed. He then displaced John Preston as religious adviser to the duke, a change that became clear around December 1624.

== Under Charles I ==
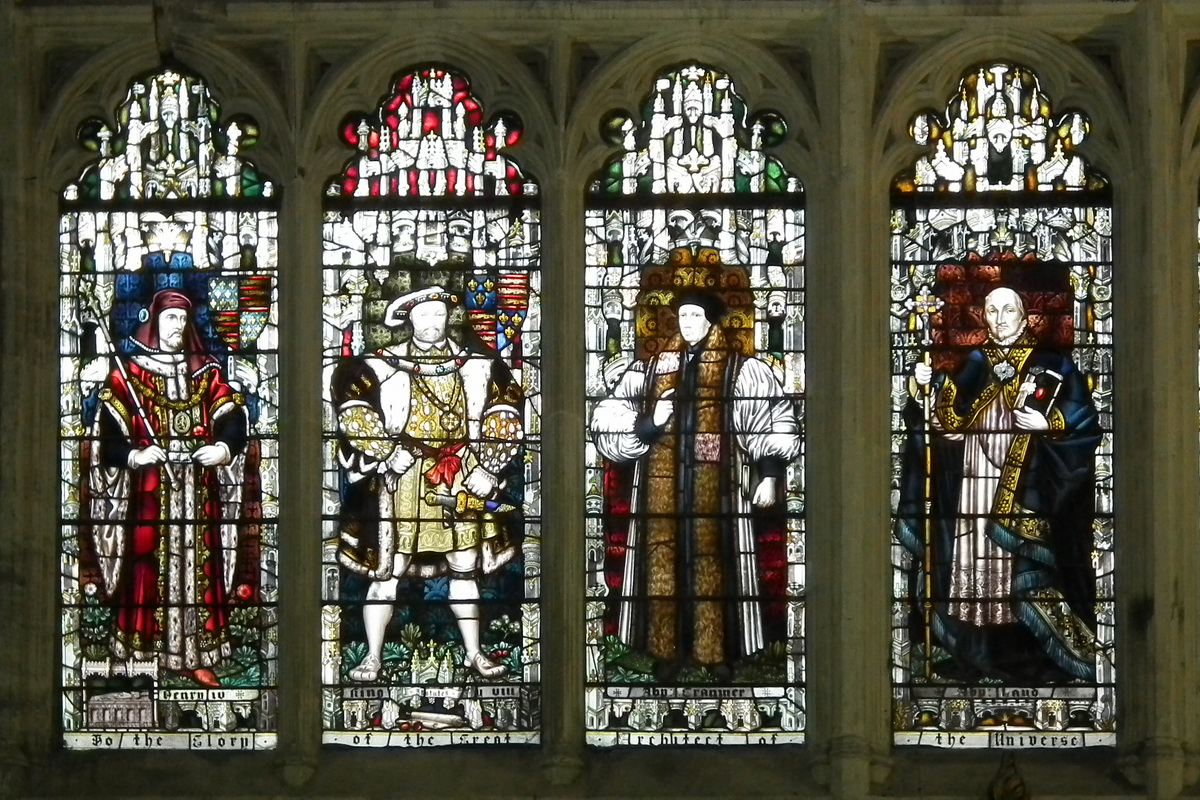
Stained glass windows in the Chapter House of Canterbury Cathedral, depicting Henry IV, Henry VIII, Thomas Cranmer and Archbishop Laud

=== 1625 to 1628 ===
Laud ascended rapidly to a position of influence in the period 1626 to 1628, advancing not alone but with a group of like-minded clerics who obtained bishoprics. In 1626 he was translated from St David's to be Bishop of Bath and Wells and in September that year he took the court position of Dean of the Chapel Royal, vacant by the death of Lancelot Andrewes. A few years later, in 1633, he became Archbishop of Canterbury, when George Abbot died. He immediately changed the Chapel services to privilege prayer over preaching, since King Charles's views were the opposite of his father's.

=== Bishop of London and "Thorough" ===
In July 1628 Laud was translated from Bath and Wells to become Bishop of London, in moves that followed on from the death of Andrewes. After this breakthrough in church politics, it becomes meaningful to define "Laudians" or "Lauders" as his followers.

On the political stage, the personal rule of Charles I began in 1629 and Laud shortly became a key part of it, in alliance with Thomas Wentworth. Historian Mark Parry argues that by 1626 in private consultations with the king and Buckingham, and in his public role in the House of Lords, Laud was a highly effective parliamentarian and a key adviser and policy-maker. Laud distrusted parliamentary bargaining, and was always determined to resist all encroachments upon the royal prerogative, especially in matters of taxation. His strong positions were the focus of attack during his trial in 1644. When Wentworth was posted to Ireland in 1632, Laud brought his personal correspondence from him rapidly to the king's attention. It is in this correspondence, in 1633, that the term "Thorough" appears. In practical terms it meant the pursuit of ambitious policy objectives, on behalf of the king, disregarding special interests, and, particularly, legalistic prevarications. There were opponents at court: Richard Weston, 1st Earl of Portland, Francis Cottington, 1st Baron Cottington and Queen Henrietta Maria. Cottington observed that Laud could not keep his temper in Council meetings, and by 1637 Laud found he could not follow Wentworth in imagining their push for rigid policies would succeed.

=== Archbishop of Canterbury ===
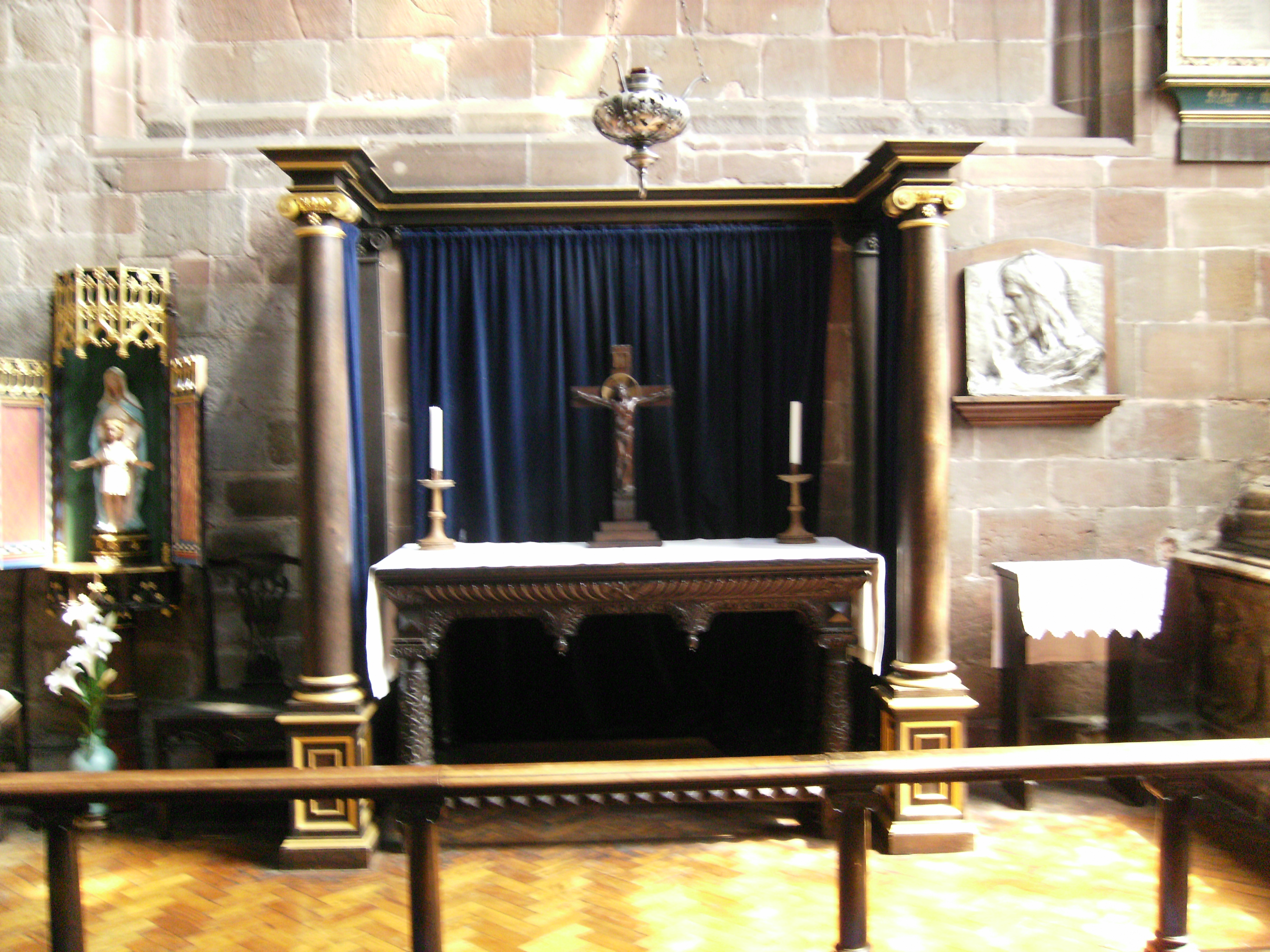
Altar, c. 1635, the centre of dispute between Puritans and Laudians, possibly consecrated by Laud himself, in St Peter's Collegiate Church in Wolverhampton.

Laud was almost 60 years old when he became archbishop and, having waited for a decade to replace George Abbot, was no longer prepared to compromise on any aspect of his policy. Abbot's chaplains had licensed Histriomastix for publication in 1630; the book which attacked English theatre and Christmas celebrations, among others, had caused scandal when it appeared in late 1632. One of Laud's early moves was to bring in his own men as censors: Samuel Baker (who was chaplain to William Juxon), William Bray and Matthew Weeks. The operations of the censors, including William Haywood who joined them, became a focus of the Long Parliament as soon as it was convened in November 1640, and Laud ultimately had to answer for Haywood at his own trial.

Whereas Wentworth (who became the Earl of Strafford in early 1640) saw the political dangers of Puritanism, Laud saw the Calvinist movement's threat to the episcopacy. But the Puritans themselves felt threatened: the Counter-Reformation was succeeding abroad and Protestants were not winning the Thirty Years' War. In this climate, Laud's high church policy could be seen as sinister. A year after Laud's appointment as Archbishop of Canterbury, the ship Griffin left for America, carrying religious dissidents such as Anne Hutchinson, the Reverend John Lothropp and the Reverend Zechariah Symmes.

Laud's desire to impose uniformity on the Church of England was driven by a belief that this was his office's duty, but his methods seemed persecution to those of differing views. Thus, they had the unintended consequence of garnering support for the most implacable opponents of the Anglican compromise. In 1637, Histriomastix's author, William Prynne, was convicted of seditious libel along with John Bastwick and Henry Burton, and had their ears cropped and faces branded. Prynne reinterpreted the "SL" ("Seditious Libeller") branded on his forehead as "Stigmata Laudis". This led to popular discontent, particularly in London, and in May 1640 a large armed mob was seen attacking Lambeth Palace in the hope of capturing the Archbishop. Laud also moved to silence his critic among the bishops, John Williams, who was convicted of various offences in Star Chamber. Contrary to Laud's expectation, Williams refused to resign as Bishop of Lincoln, and the Lords forced his release, after which Williams supported the impeachment of both Strafford (Wentworth) and Laud. Williams specifically urged the king not to commute Strafford's death sentence, and he was executed in 1641, months before Charles I promoted Williams to Archbishop of York (only to be re-imprisoned by Parliament and then join the King in Yorkshire upon his release).

Toward the end of his life, Charles I admitted that he had put too much trust in Laud, and allowed his "peevish humours" and obsession with points of ritual to inflame divisions within the Church: he warned his son not to rely on anyone else's judgment in such matters. Laud, on his side, could not forgive the king for allowing Strafford's execution and dismissed his royal master as "a mild and gracious Prince, that knows not how to be, or be made, great".

=== Trial and execution ===
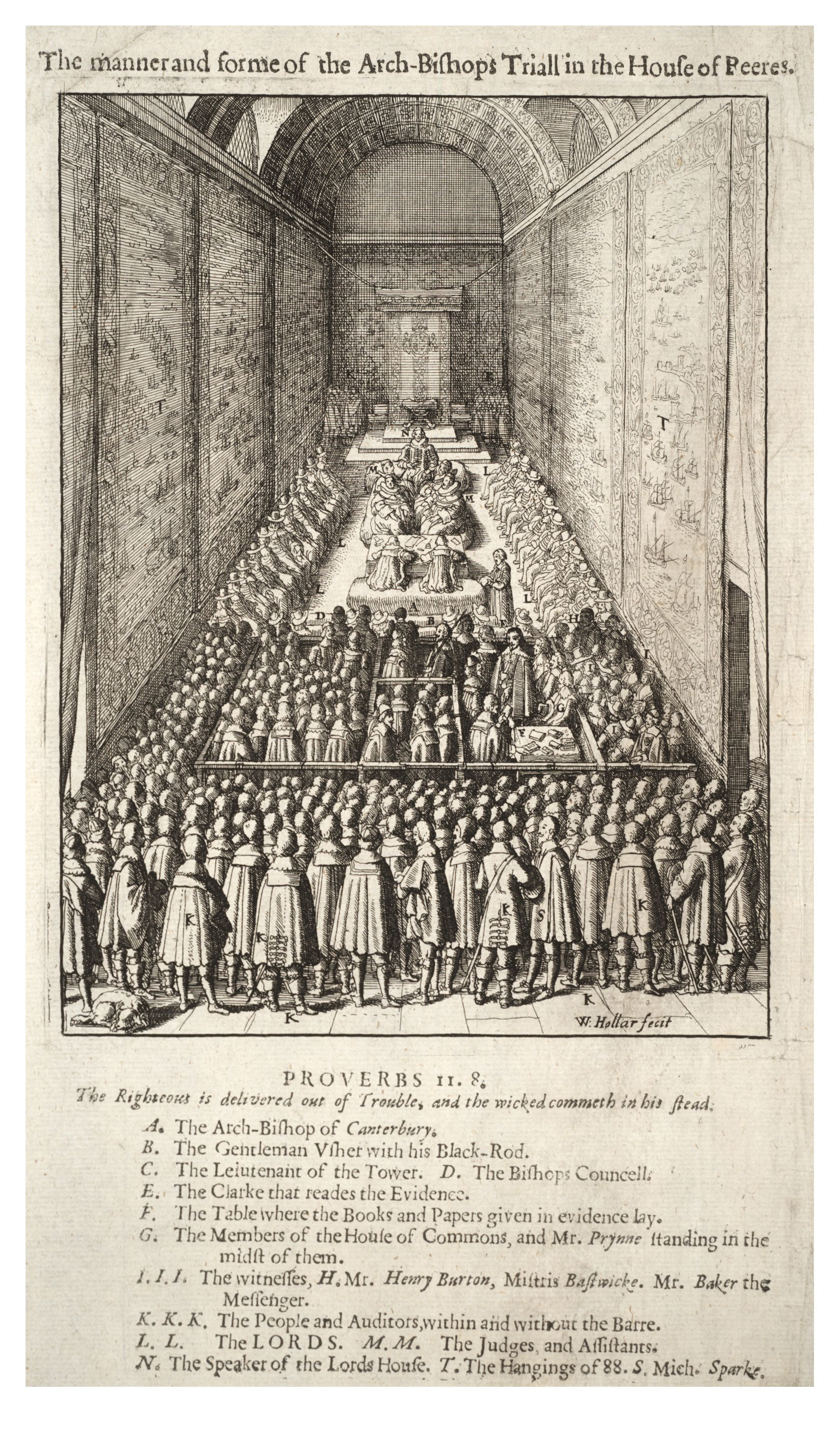
Etching by Wenceslaus Hollar showing Laud being tried for treason in the House of Lords, with several people present labelled

The Long Parliament of 1640 accused Laud of treason and, in the Grand Remonstrance of 1641, called for his imprisonment. Laud was imprisoned in the Tower of London, where he remained throughout the early stages of the English Civil War. Apart from a few personal enemies like William Prynne (and possibly Archbishop Williams), Parliament showed little eagerness to proceed against Laud; given his age (68 in 1641), most members would probably have preferred to leave him to die of natural causes. In the spring of 1644, he was brought to trial which ended without a verdict: as with Strafford, it proved impossible to point to any specific action seen as treasonable.

Parliament took up the issue and eventually passed a bill of attainder, under which Laud was beheaded on Tower Hill on 10 January 1645, notwithstanding being granted a royal pardon. As the common hangman of London, Richard Brandon carried out Laud's execution, just as he had, in May 1641, of the Earl of Strafford. Laud was buried in the chapel of St John's College, Oxford, his alma mater.

== Legacy ==
Laud is remembered in the Church of England and the Episcopal Church of the United States with a commemoration on 10 January.

His collected works in seven volumes were published between 1847 and 1860 in the Library of Anglo-Catholic Theology.

The English diplomat Sir Thomas Roe told the queen of Bohemia that Laud was 'very just, incorrupt...a rare counsellor for integrity'.

Emeritus Professor at Cambridge Patrick Collinson, an expert in Elizabethan Puritans, in 1980 published this rebuke of Laud in his book on the decades until 1625: "the greatest calamity ever visited upon the English Church".

In September 2016, following King's School, Gloucester, Reading School named their newest students' division Laud House after him.

The pun "give great praise to the Lord, and little Laud to the devil" ("laud" meaning, "praise", from the Latin word laudāre) is a joke attributed to Archibald Armstrong, Charles's court jester; Laud was known to be touchy about his diminutive stature.

== Arms ==
Coat of arms of William Laud
Notes While Laud was serving as a bishop his arms would be displayed impaling those of his diocese and topped by a mitre. Escutcheon Sable on a chevron between three estoiles Or three crosses pattee fitchy Gules.

== See also ==
- Lectionary 20

== Notes ==
Political offices
Preceded by The Earl of Portland as Lord High Treasurer	First Lord of the Treasury; 1635–1636	Succeeded by William Juxon as Lord High Treasurer
Church of England titles
Preceded by Richard Field	Dean of Gloucester; 1616–1621	Succeeded by Richard Senhouse
Preceded by Richard Milbourne	Bishop of St David's; 1621–1626	Succeeded by Theophilus Feild
Preceded by Arthur Lake	Bishop of Bath and Wells; 1626–1628	Succeeded by Leonard Mawe
Preceded by George Montaigne	Bishop of London; 1628–1633	Succeeded by William Juxon
Preceded by George Abbot	Archbishop of Canterbury; 1633–1645	Vacant Title next held by William Juxon
Academic offices
Preceded by The 3rd Earl of Pembroke	Chancellor of the University of Oxford; 1630–1641	Succeeded by The 4th Earl of Pembroke
Preceded by John Buckeridge	President of St John's College, Oxford; 1611–1621	Succeeded by William Juxon
Preceded by George Abbot	Chancellor of the University of Dublin; 1633–1645	Succeeded by The Marquess of Ormonde
