= Birkbeck Fells =

British place

Coordinates: 54.4480°N 2.6417°W

Birkbeck Fells is a township located in part of the parishes of Crosby Ravensworth, Orton and Shap in the historic county of Westmorland. (Note: Variant historical spellings of Birkbeck include Birbeck, Bibreke, Bridlake) It is a large mountainous district, and was described in the mid nineteenth century as containing around thirty scattered houses. The area is drained by Birk Beck and Bretherdale Beck, both of which are tributaries of the River Lune.

A map of 1858 shows that at the time Birkbeck Fells consisted of several detached parts to the north of Brethedrale and west of the hamlet of Greenholme, together with the undivided moor of Birkbeck Fells Common

It is notable for being the birth-place of Nicholas Close whom Henry VI of England appointed to oversee the construction of King's College Chapel, Cambridge.
