= John Bardsley =

Bishop of Carlisle (1835–1904)

The Right Reverend John Bardsley
- Bishop of Carlisle
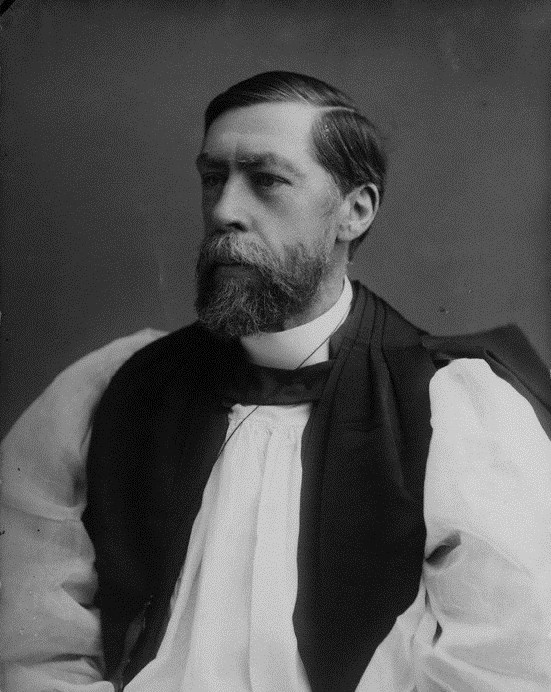
- Diocese: Diocese of Carlisle
- In office: 1891–1904(death)
- Predecessor: Harvey Goodwin
- Successor: Henry Williams
- Other post: Bishop of Sodor and Man (1887–1891)

Personal details
- Born: 29 March 1835 Keighley, Yorkshire
- Died: 14 March 1914 (aged 78) Carlisle, Cumbria
- Buried: Roughtonhead, Cumberland
- Denomination: Anglican
- Education: Manchester Grammar School; Trinity College, Dublin

John Wareing Bardsley (29 March 1835 – 14 March 1904) was the Bishop of Carlisle.

He was the son of Canon James Bardsley, once a Bradford curate. As a boy he lived in Church Street, Burnley, attending Burnley Grammar School between 1843 and 1848. He continued his education at Manchester Grammar School and Trinity College, Dublin.

He began his career as a curate at St Anne's Sale after which he held incumbencies at St John's, Bootle and then St Saviour's, Liverpool. From 1880 to 1886 he was Archdeacon of Warrington and then Archdeacon of Liverpool for a year before his ordination to the episcopate as Bishop of Sodor and Man in 1887. In 1891 he was translated to Carlisle, a post he held until his death on 14 March 1904.

He was buried at Roughtonhead near Carlisle. Whilst at Bootle he had married Mary Powell with whom he had five children.

Later generations of the Bardsley family included Cyril Bardsley, Bishop of Peterborough from 1924 to 1927, and Cuthbert Bardsley, suffragan Bishop of Croydon from 1947 to 1956, and Bishop of Coventry from 1956 to 1976.

Church of England titles
| Preceded by Rowley Hill | Bishop of Sodor and Man; 1887 – 1891 | Succeeded by Norman Dumenil Straton |
| Preceded by Harvey Goodwin | Bishop of Carlisle; 1891 – 1904 | Succeeded by John Diggle |
