= Walter Mauclerk =

13th-century Bishop of Carlisle

- Bishop of Carlisle
- Elected: 22 August 1223
- Predecessor: Hugh of Beaulieu
- Successor: Silvester de Everdon
- Other post: Canon of Carlisle Cathedral

Orders
- Consecration: winter 1223–1224

Personal details
- Died: c. 28 October 1248 Oxford

Treasurer
- In office 13 November 1228 – 1233
- Monarch: Henry III
- Preceded by: Eustace of Fauconberg
- Succeeded by: Peter des Rivaux

Walter Mauclerk (or Walter Mauclerc; died 1248) was a medieval Bishop of Carlisle and Lord High Treasurer of England.

== Life ==
Mauclerk's origins are unknown, although he had a brother who was prior of Reading Abbey. Another kinsman, possibly a nephew, Robert Barri, was named prior of Carlisle Cathedral while Walter was bishop. He is first recorded as a financial clerk in Normandy in 1202, and then later that same year as holding a church in Falaise. With the loss of Normandy, he returned to England and the king's court, and received a prebend in Exeter in 1203. In 1204 and 1205 he helped administer Lincolnshire, collecting tallage and other taxes. He served King John of England in Rome as an envoy to Pope Innocent III in 1214, where he was expected to neutralise any baronial agents that might be sent. At the time, he was still a royal clerk. In 1215, he was sent to Ireland, although only for a short time. He served as a royal justice in the Midlands in 1218, and as a royal justice in Nottingham in 1219, and in 1221 appointed as a forest justice in York, but was instead sent to Cumberland. He served as Sheriff of Cumberland from 1222 to 1233. He was a canon of Carlisle Cathedral before he was elected to the see of Carlisle about 22 August 1223 and was consecrated that winter.

Mauclerk continued to serve King Henry III of England, going to Cologne in 1225 as part of a diplomatic mission attempting to arrange a marriage between the king and a daughter of the duke of Austria. In 1227, he was in Poitou on the king's business. He was Treasurer from 1228 to 1233, when he was expelled from office even though he had been granted the office for life. This was a side effect of the fall from power of Hubert de Burgh during King Henry III's reign. However, with the fall from power of Peter des Roches Walter returned to royal service. In 1235, he was once more in charge of an embassy attempting to find a bride for King Henry, this time to Flanders for a daughter of the count of Ponthieu.

Mauclerk resigned the see on 26 June 1246 and died about 28 October 1248 at Oxford. He resigned the bishopric to become a Dominican at Oxford. During his time as bishop, he set the financial affairs of his diocese on a firm footing, and left most of his property to the diocese or to the Dominicans at Oxford.

== Citations ==
Political offices
Preceded by Eustace of Fauconberg	Lord High Treasurer; 1228–1233	Succeeded by Peter des Rivaux
Catholic Church titles
Preceded by Hugh of Beaulieu	Bishop of Carlisle; 1223–1246	Succeeded by Silvester de Everdon
