= John Kite =

John Kite (died 1537) was successively Archbishop of Armagh, 1513–1521, and Bishop of Carlisle, 1521–1537.

== Biography ==
John Kite was educated at Eton College and then at King's College, Cambridge, where he was graduated Bachelor of Canon Law. He was appointed a prebendary of Exeter Cathedral and Sub-Dean of the King's Chapel, Westminster in 1510. From 1510–1518 he was prebendary of Stratton in the diocese of Salisbury.

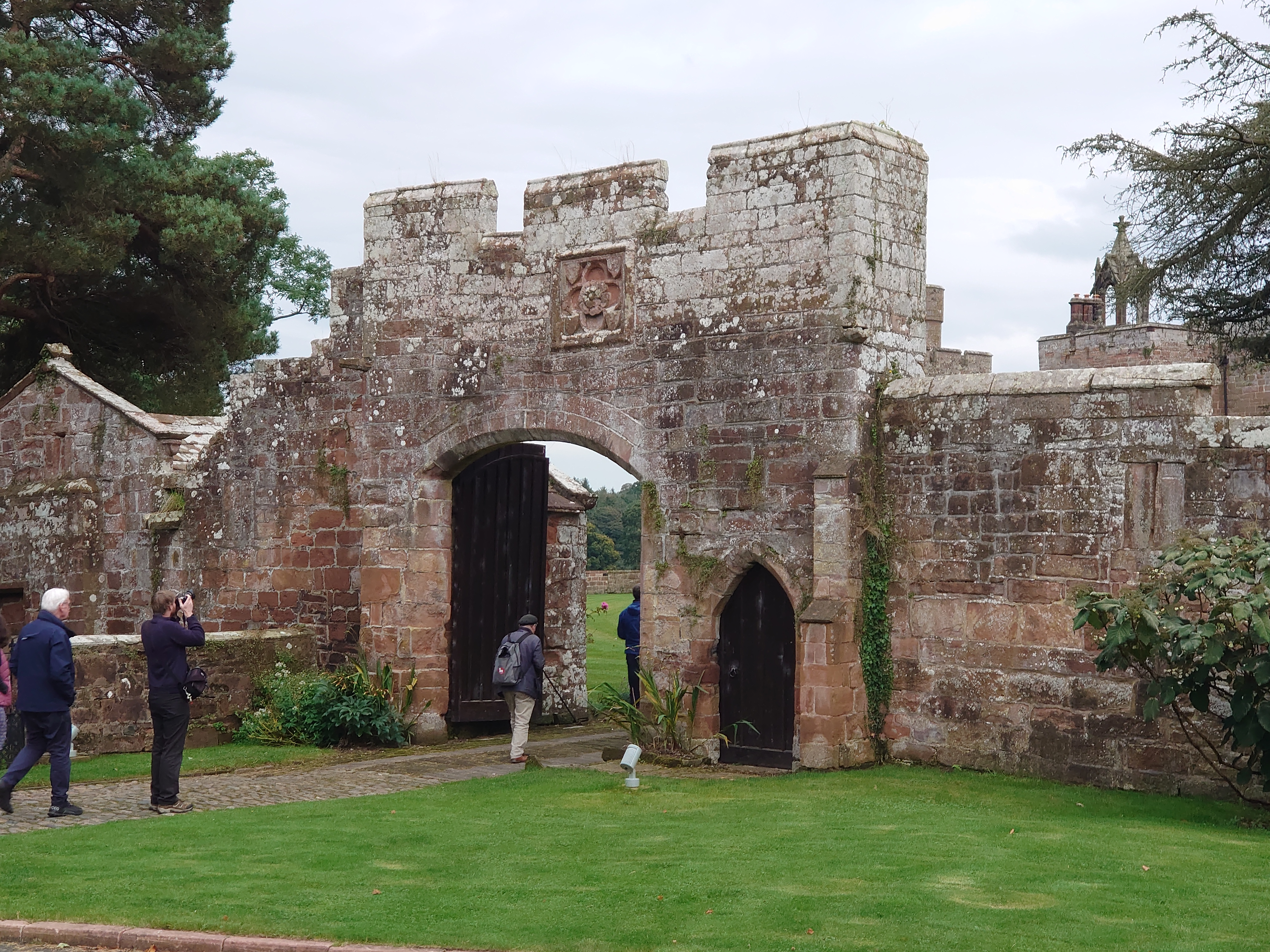
Kite added the gate to Rose Castle in the 16th century.

In 1518, as archbishop, he accompanied John Bourchier, 2nd Baron Berners on an embassy to Charles I of Spain and was present at the Field of the Cloth of Gold in 1520. In 1522 he was living at Rose Castle, Cumberland when he was visited by Dr William Burbank, Archdeacon of Carlisle Cathedral, of whom he wrote to Cardinal Wolsey. His alliance with Wolsey may explain his quick promotion. He took the Oath of Supremacy in 1534.

Catholic Church titles
| Preceded by Octavian De Spinellis | Archbishop of Armagh; 1513–1521 | Succeeded by George Cromer |
| Preceded by John Penny | Bishop of Carlisle; 1521–1537 | Succeeded by Robert Aldrich |
