= Serlo (abbot of Gloucester) =

11th and 12th-century Norman abbot in England

- Abbot of Gloucester
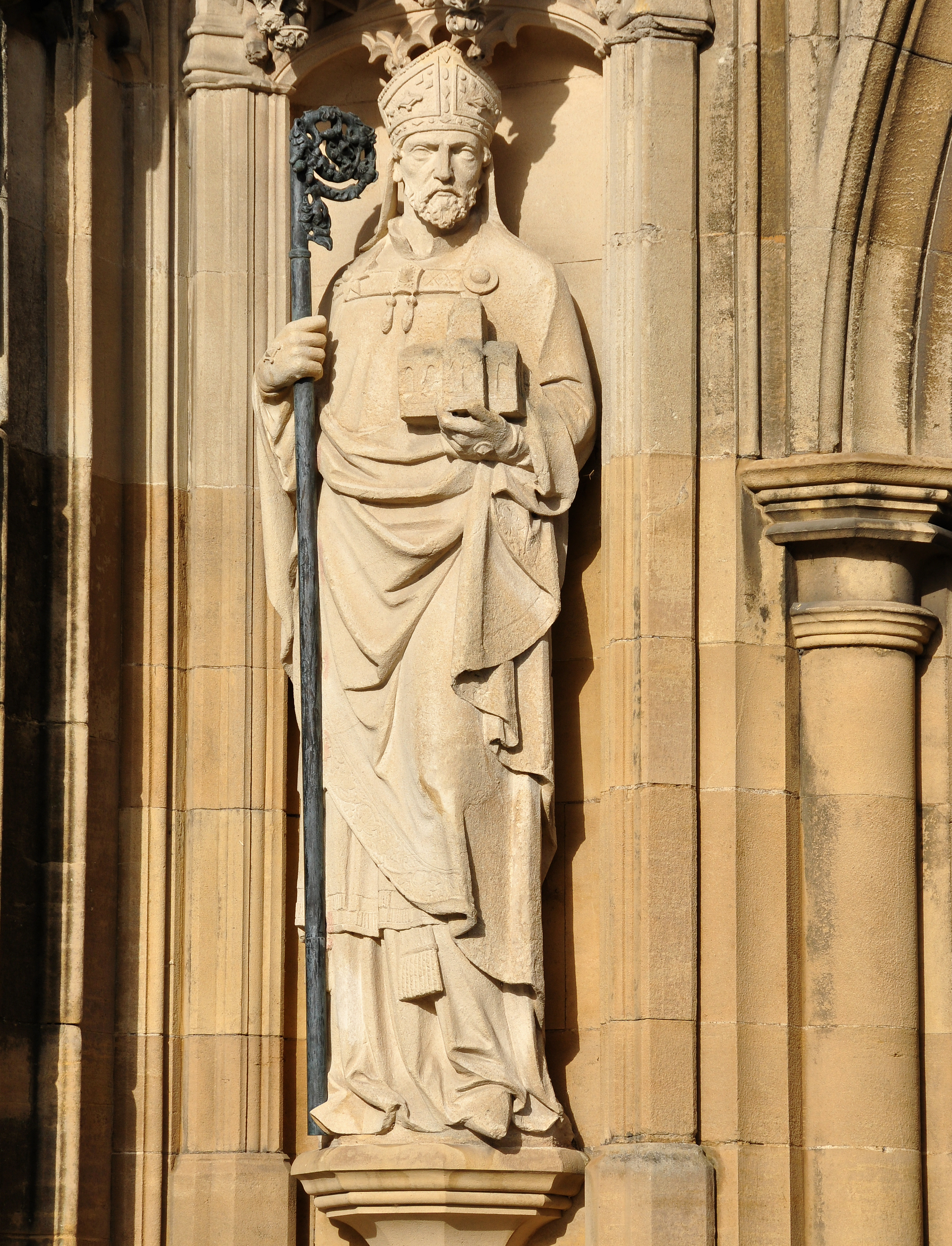
- Statue of Abbot Serlo near the entrance to Gloucester Cathedral
- Church: Gloucester Abbey
- Appointed: 1072
- Term ended: 1104
- Predecessor: Wulfstan
- Successor: Peter

Personal details
- Died: 1104

Serlo (died 1104) was a medieval abbot of Gloucester Abbey.

== Biography ==
Serlo was a native of Normandy and became a canon at Avranches Cathedral. He then became a monk at Mont Saint-Michel, around 1067. In 1072 he became abbot of Gloucester Abbey, having been suggested for the office by Osmund. Serlo served as abbot until his death in 1104 after holding office for 33 years. (Note: Katharine Keats-Rohan gives his death date as 1114, but her source is Heads of Religious Houses which gives a date of 1104.)

Serlo was present at King William II of England's Christmas court in 1093 which was held at Gloucester. In 1096 Serlo secured from the king a confirmation of a number of gifts to the monastery as well as the return of lands to the monastic demesne that had been held by the archbishops of York. In Orderic Vitalis' account of the death of William II, one of the monks of Gloucester had a vision that the king was going to die because God was punishing him for the royal treatment of the church. Serlo is said to have sent a knight with a letter detailing this vision to the king, which reached him just prior to the king beginning his hunting party, which ended in his death on 2 August 1100. Orderic relates that on receiving the message from Serlo, the king mocked the message and rode off to his death. It is unclear if this story is actually true. Historian Emma Mason points out that if there was a plot to kill the king, it was possible that rumours of the plot were heard at Gloucester. Serlo may have hoped to ingratiate himself with the king by warning him. The fact that any correspondence does not survive is not conclusive, as correspondence of this sort was routinely destroyed after receipt. But it is also possible that Orderic made up the story for dramatic effect. (Note: Other writers told similar stories of prophetic visions of the king's death, but ascribe them to other persons, including Merlin and Anselm of Canterbury.)

During his time in office he rebuilt the abbey's church, which had been destroyed in the rebellion of 1088. This was a large, complex building and has been called "one of the most ambitious churches built in post-Conquest England". The new church was dedicated in 1100 but burnt along with the city of Gloucester in 1102. He also revitalized the devotional life of the monastery. In his old age he made the abbey's cellarer, Odo, a coadjunct abbot.
