= John de Halton =

13th and 14th-century Bishop of Carlisle

- Bishop of Carlisle
- Elected: 23 April 1292
- Installed: January 1293
- Term ended: 1 November 1324
- Predecessor: Ralph of Irton
- Successor: William Ayremyn
- Other post: cellarer of Carlisle Cathedral

Orders
- Consecration: 14 September 1292

Personal details
- Died: 1 November 1324 manor of Rose
- Buried: probably Carlisle Cathedral

John de Halton (died 1324), also called John de Halghton, was an English priest and Bishop of Carlisle from 1292 to 1324.

== Life ==
Little is known of Halton's background, but he attended Oxford University. He was a canon and cellarer in Carlisle Cathedral. He was elected bishop on 23 April 1292, and consecrated on 14 September 1292. He was not enthroned until January 1293, however, because after his consecration he was with King Edward I of England in Scotland. He was present at Berwick when Edward decided that the throne of Scotland should go to John Balliol. Halton spent much of the time between 1292 and 1295 in Scotland, for Pope Nicholas IV had appointed Halton to collect the crusading tax that the pope had imposed. However, when England and Scotland went to war in 1296, Halton returned to his diocese and remained there.

In January 1298 Halton appeared at a meeting in York held by Roger Bigod the Earl of Norfolk and Humphrey de Bohun the Earl of Hereford and excommunicated all opponents of Magna Carta. During the reign of King Edward II of England his diocese was exposed to constant raids from the Scots, and much of his time was spent in trying to repair the damage from the raids. In 1309 he excommunicated Robert the Bruce for the murder of John Comyn three years earlier. He served as an envoy to Scotland again in 1320. He was an attendee of the gathering, or anti-Parliament, held at Sherburn and led by Thomas the Earl of Lancaster in June 1321. This gathering was part of the baronial uprising against King Edward II and his favorites the Despensers, but Halton does not seem to have played any further role in the conflict.

Halton died on 1 November 1324 at his manor at Rose. He was probably buried in his cathedral, but his tomb no longer survives. His register episcopal acts, however, does survive, and is the first one from Carlisle still extant.

== Citations ==
Catholic Church titles
| Preceded by Ralph of Irton | Bishop of Carlisle; 1292–1324 | Succeeded by William Ayremyn |
