= Robert Snoden =

English bishop

Robert Snoden or Snowden (Mansfield, unknown date – London, 1621) was an English bishop.

== Life ==
He was born in Mansfield Woodhouse, the third son of Ralph Snoden. In May 1580 he matriculated as a sizar at Christ's College, Cambridge, where he graduated B.A. in 1583, M.A. in 1586, B.D 1593. He became a Fellow of Christ's in 1589, rector of Harby, Leicestershire, in 1596 and of Hickling, Nottinghamshire in 1598. The same year, he received the degree of Doctor of Divinity.

Snoden became a chaplain to James I in 1614, and was appointed as Bishop of Carlisle in 1616. This was attributed to the influence of George Villiers. Snoden found his diocese poverty-stricken rather than troublesome, as he wrote to the king. He died in London.

== Notes ==
Church of England titles
Preceded by Henry Robinson	Bishop of Carlisle; 1616–1621	Succeeded by Richard Milbourne
