= Thomas Appleby (bishop) =

14th-century Bishop of Carlisle

- Bishop of Carlisle
- Elected: after 18 January 1363
- Term ended: 5 December 1395
- Predecessor: Gilbert Welton
- Successor: Robert Reed

Orders
- Consecration: 18 June 1363

Personal details
- Died: 5 December 1395
- Denomination: Catholic

Thomas Appleby (or Thomas de Appleby) was a Bishop of Carlisle. He was elected after 18 January 1363, and consecrated 18 June 1363. He died on 5 December 1395.

== Citations ==
Catholic Church titles
Preceded by Gilbert Welton	Bishop of Carlisle; 1363–1395	Succeeded by Robert Reed
