= Richard Senhouse =

English churchman

Richard Senhouse (died 1626) was an English churchman, Bishop of Carlisle from 1624 to 1626.

== Life ==
He was third son of John Senhouse (d. 1604) of Netherhall, Cumberland (now part of Maryport), by Anne, daughter of John Ponsonby of Hail Hall and the great-great-nephew of William Senhouse, bishop of Carlisle and Durham. His father was an antiquary who collected Roman remains, and Sir Robert Bruce Cotton visited him in 1599.

Richard was educated, first at Trinity College and then at St. John's College, Cambridge, where he graduated M.A. in 1598 (incorporated at Oxford in 1600), and proceeded B.D. by grace of 15 February 1608, D.D. in 1622. He became fellow of St. John's on 7 April 1598.

He was known as a preacher, and became chaplain successively to Edward Russell, 3rd Earl of Bedford, Prince Charles, and King James I. In 1606 he was appointed vicar of Bumpsted Steeple, Essex; in 1608 he was rector of Cheam, Surrey, and on 18 December 1621 he became dean of Gloucester. He was made bishop of Carlisle on 26 September 1624, and preached the coronation sermon for Charles I on 2 February 1626. He died three months later after a fall from his horse, on 6 May 1626, and was buried in Carlisle Cathedral. A volume containing four sermons by him was published in London in 1627.

Church of England titles
Preceded by Richard Milbourne	Bishop of Carlisle; 1624–1626	Succeeded by Francis White
