= John Kirkby (bishop of Carlisle) =

14th-century Bishop of Carlisle

- Bishop of Carlisle
- Elected: about 8 May 1332
- Term ended: about 3 December 1352
- Predecessor: John Ross
- Successor: John Horncastle

Orders
- Consecration: 19 July 1332

Personal details
- Died: c. 3 December 1352
- Denomination: Catholic

John Kirkby was Bishop of Carlisle, elected about 8 May 1332 and consecrated on 19 July 1332. He died about 3 December 1352.

== Citations ==
Catholic Church titles
| Preceded by John Ross | Bishop of Carlisle; 1332–1352 | Succeeded by John Horncastle |
