= Bernard (bishop of Carlisle) =

13th-century Bishop of Carlisle

- Bishop of Carlisle
- Appointed: 15 May 1203
- Term ended: c. 8 July 1214
- Predecessor: Paulinus of Leeds
- Successor: Hugh of Beaulieu
- Other post: Bishop of Ragusa

Personal details
- Died: c. 8 July 1214
- Denomination: Catholic

Bernard (died 1214) was a medieval English Bishop of Carlisle.

Bernard was the custodian of vacant see of Carlisle from about 1200. He was translated from the bishopric of Ragusa to the bishopric of Carlisle on 15 May 1203 by Pope Innocent III. He died about 8 July 1214.

== Citations ==
Catholic Church titles
Preceded by Paulinus of Leeds	Bishop of Carlisle; 1203–1214	Succeeded by Hugh of Beaulieu
