= John Kingscote =

15th-century Bishop of Carlisle

- Bishop of Carlisle
- Appointed: about August 1462
- Term ended: 5 November 1463
- Predecessor: William Percy
- Successor: Richard Scroope

Orders
- Consecration: 24 October 1462

Personal details
- Died: 5 November 1463
- Denomination: Catholic

John Kingscote (or Kingscotes) was a Bishop of Carlisle. He was selected about August 1462, and consecrated 24 October 1462. He died on 5 November 1463.

== Citations ==
Catholic Church titles
Preceded by William Percy	Bishop of Carlisle; 1462–1463	Succeeded by Richard Scroope
