= Ralph of Irton =

13th-century Bishop of Carlisle

- Bishop of Carlisle
- Elected: 14 December 1278
- Term ended: 1 March 1292
- Predecessor: William de Rotherfeld
- Successor: John de Halton
- Other post: Prior of Gisborough

Orders
- Consecration: 24 March 1280 by Ordoño Cardinal Álvarez

Personal details
- Died: 1 March 1292 London
- Buried: Carlisle Cathedral
- Denomination: Roman Catholic

Ralph of Irton (Note: Or Ralph de Ireton or Ralph Ireton) (died 1292) was a Bishop of Carlisle, England.

== Life ==
Ralph was a canon of Gisborough Priory, an Augustinian foundation, sometime before 1257. Between 1257 and 1261 he was elected prior of Gisborough. He was elected to the see of Carlisle on 14 December 1278. However, King Edward I of England objected to the election because no new licence had been obtained from the king after William de Rotherfeld refused the see. Ralph appealed to Pope Nicholas III and the election was quashed, however Nicholas then provided Ralph to the see and he was consecrated before 9 April 1280.

Ralph imposed taxation in his diocese to secure the completion of Carlisle Cathedral. He also served Edward as a diplomat in the negotiations over the proposed marriage of the future Edward II to Margaret, the Maid of Norway, which never came to pass after Margaret's death soon after the marriage was arranged. Ralph died on 1 March 1292 while attending a parliament at London, from a burst vein. His will provided that most of his belongings be left to his successors at Carlisle. He was buried in Carlisle Cathedral, but his tomb was destroyed soon after his burial by a fire in the cathedral.

== Citations ==
Catholic Church titles
Preceded by William de Rotherfeld	Bishop of Carlisle; 1278–1292	Succeeded by John de Halton
