= John Ross (bishop of Carlisle) =

14th-century Bishop of Carlisle

- Bishop of Carlisle
- Appointed: 13 February 1325
- Term ended: 1332
- Predecessor: William Ayremyn
- Successor: John Kirkby

Orders
- Consecration: 24 February 1325

Personal details
- Died: May 1332
- Denomination: Catholic

John Ross (or John de Rosse) was a Bishop of Carlisle. He was selected on 13 February 1325, and consecrated 24 February 1325.

Ross, along with Archbishop Melton, and the bishops of London and Rochester alone spoke up in Edward II's defence during the Parliamentary session that deposed Edward.

He died in May 1332.

== Citations ==
Catholic Church titles
Preceded by William Ayremyn	Bishop of Carlisle; 1325–1332	Succeeded by John Kirkby
