= Hugh of Beaulieu =

13th-century Bishop of Carlisle

- Bishop of Carlisle
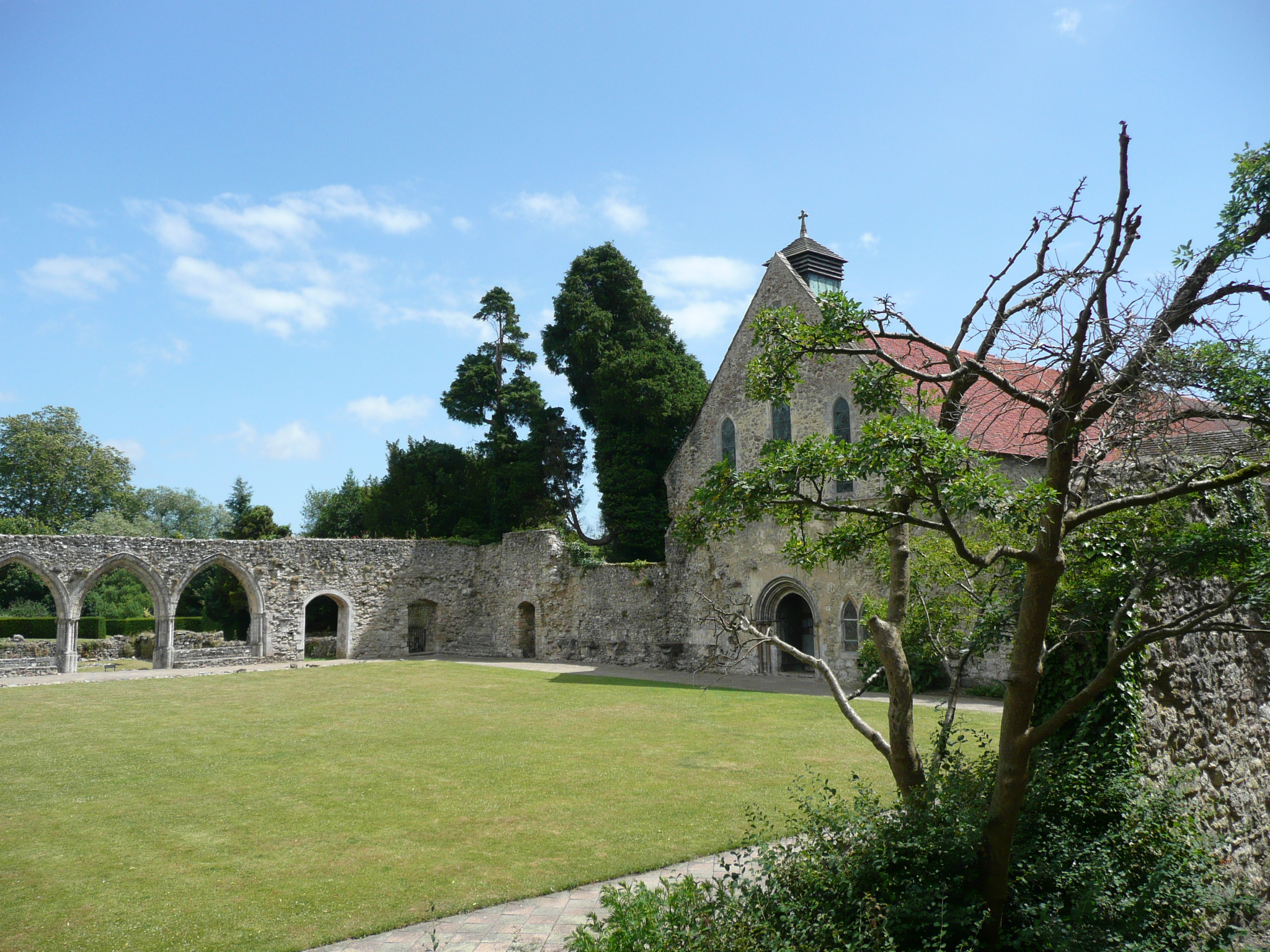
- Beaulieu Abbey, 2008
- Elected: 1 August 1218
- Term ended: 4 June 1223
- Predecessor: Bernard
- Successor: Walter Mauclerk
- Other post: Abbot of Beaulieu

Orders
- Consecration: 24 February 1219

Personal details
- Died: 4 June 1223

Hugh of Beaulieu (died 1223) was a medieval English Bishop of Carlisle.

== Life ==
Hugh was the first abbot of the Cistercian Beaulieu Abbey, which had originally been located at Faringdon in Berkshire (now Oxfordshire), before he was selected for the see of Carlisle. In 1214 and 1216, Hugh was censured by the Chapter General of the Cistercian Order for the ostentation of his lifestyle. He was accused of eating off silver plate, keeping a guard dog in his bedroom with a silver chain, and of too much revelry with earls and knights. While abbot, he attended the Fourth Lateran Council in 1215. He had been deposed as abbot before he was chosen as bishop, at some point shortly before 1218. He was elected about 1 August 1218, and consecrated on 24 February 1219. He was not the choice of the cathedral chapter of Carlisle, and his election was forced on them. He died on 4 June 1223.

== Citations ==
Catholic Church titles
Preceded by Bernard	Bishop of Carlisle; 1218–1223	Succeeded by Walter Mauclerk
