= Æthelwold (bishop of Carlisle) =

12th-century Bishop of Carlisle

Athelwold
- Bishop of Carlisle
- Appointed: June 1133
- Term ended: resigned 1153
- Predecessor: new foundation
- Successor: Paulinus of Leeds
- Other post: Prior of Nostell Priory

Orders
- Consecration: August 1133

Personal details
- Died: 1156 or 1157

Æthelwold (Note: Or Athelwold, Æthelwulf, Aethelwulf, Aldulf, Ethelwulf, or Adelulf) (died c. 1156) was the first Bishop of Carlisle in medieval England.

== Early life ==
Æthelwold's name and the fact that he owned lands in Yorkshire suggests that Æthelwold was of English birth, and not a Norman. He was an Augustinian canon who first served King Henry I of England as his confessor. Sometime about 1122, he persuaded Henry to help a group of clerics at Nostell find a new site for their priory. Æthelwold then became prior of the newly established Nostell Priory. Some reports give Æthelwold a role as an advisor to King Henry during the selection of William de Corbeil as Archbishop of Canterbury in 1123. While prior he built the crypt of the monastic church and represented King Henry at a papal council held at Rheims in 1131. He also founded daughter houses of Nostell at Scone in Scotland.

== Bishop ==
Æthelwold was nominated to the see of Carlisle about June 1133, and consecrated in August 1133. Carlisle was a newly founded see, created by King Henry in Cumbria, in order to extend the rule of the English into areas in dispute between Scotland and England. Previously, the area had been under the control of the bishop of Glasgow, but with the new foundation under the authority of the Archbishop of York, English rule would be easier to assert in the area. The idea had been under discussion for about ten years prior to 1133. The see was established with the Augustinian priory of St. Mary's in Carlisle as the cathedral church. Æthelwold was a protégé of Thurstan, the Archbishop of York.

Æthelwold installed Augustinian canons into his newly founded cathedral, which was the only cathedral in England with a cathedral chapter composed of that order of canons. The monastic rule in use in the cathedral was the Rule of Arrouaise, a French Augustinian house noted for its austerity. Carlisle only kept the Arrouaisian Rule under Æthelwold, however. In 1135, King David I of Scotland invaded and annexed the counties that comprised the see of Carlisle, and drove Æthelwold out. Æthelwold spent the next few years at King Stephen of England's court. After the Battle of the Standard in 1138, the papal legate Alberic made peace between Æthelwold and King David, and Æthelwold spent time at the Scottish king's court after this. Æthelwold had accompanied Thurstan, who was attempting to secure a truce between Stephen and David after the battle, which was secured at Carlisle.

== Later career and death ==
Æthelwold signed the charter of liberties issued by King Stephen right after the king's coronation. He later was a supporter of Henry Murdac for the see of York, against King Stephen's choice of William fitzHerbert. When Murdac was driven from his see in 1148, Æthelwold welcomed him to Carlisle. He also set up the organization of the diocese on such a firm footing that the fifty-year vacancy that transpired until the next bishop of Carlisle took office did little damage to the diocese. He retained the priorate of Nostell until 1153, when he resigned due to ill health. After the accession of King Henry II of England, Æthelwold attended the new king's court. He died on 16 June 1157 or on 25 May 1156.

== Citations ==
Catholic Church titles
New creation	Bishop of Carlisle; 1133–c. 1157	Succeeded by Paulinus of Leeds
