= Thomas Vipont =

13th-century Bishop of Carlisle

- Bishop of Carlisle
- Elected: September 1254
- Term ended: 14 October 1256
- Predecessor: Silvester de Everdon
- Successor: Robert de Chauncy
- Other post: rector of Greystoke

Orders
- Consecration: 7 February 1255

Personal details
- Died: 14 October 1256

Thomas Vipont (died 1256) was a Bishop of Carlisle, England.

== Life ==
Vipont was a member of the family of the lords of Westmoreland and attained a magister degree from the schools. He was rector of Greystoke before he was elected bishop about September 1254, and consecrated on 7 February 1255. He was elected by the chapter of Carlisle Cathedral over the objections of King Henry III of England who had preferred that the chapter elect his chaplain John of Skipton. Henry did not push the issue, and Thomas was given the temporalities of the see on 24 December 1254. He died 14 October 1256.

== Citations ==
Catholic Church titles
Preceded by Silvester de Everdon	Bishop of Carlisle; 1254–1256	Succeeded by Robert de Chauncy
