= John Arundel (bishop of Chichester) =

15th-century Bishop of Chichester

- Bishop of Chichester
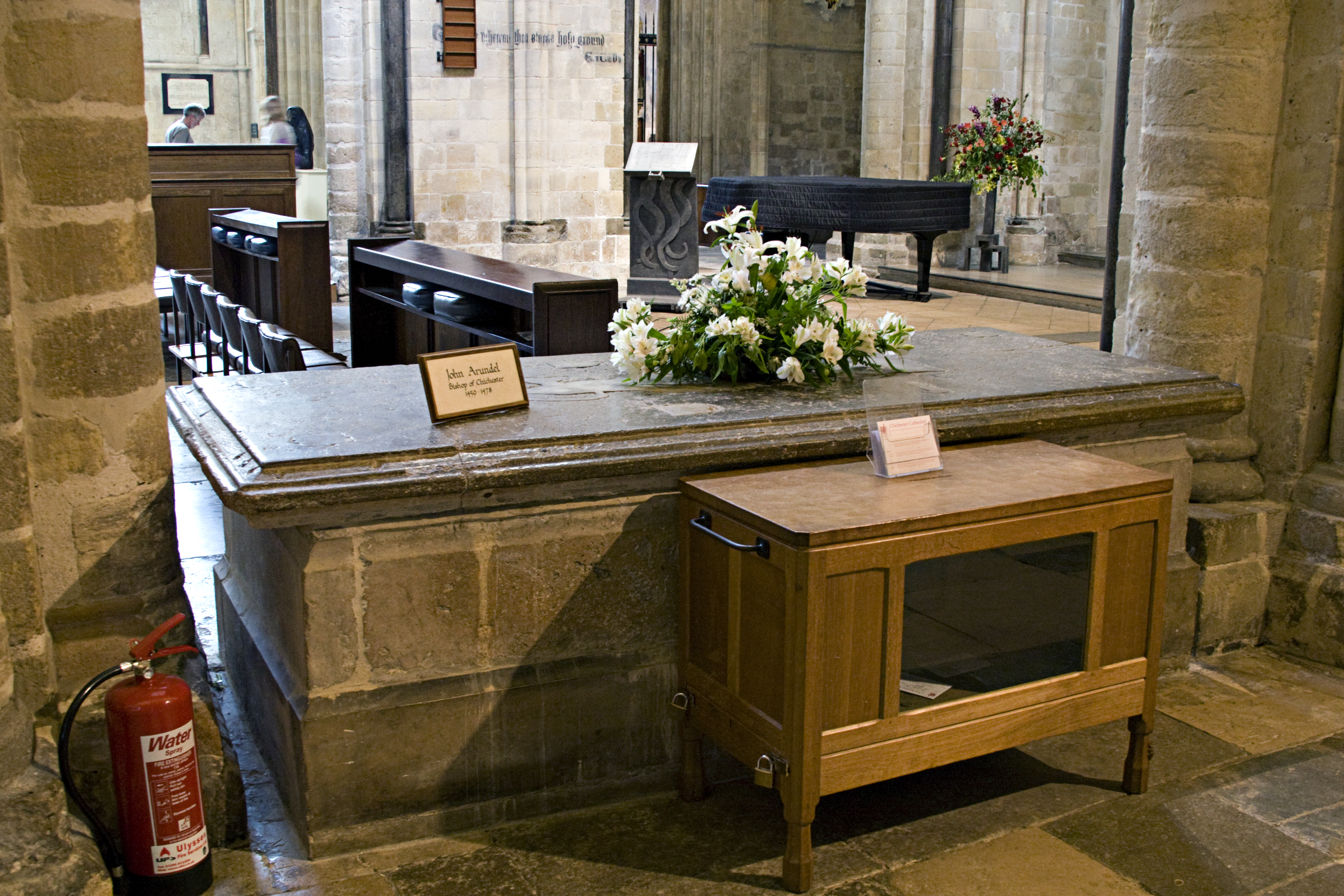
- Arundel's tomb within Chichester Cathedral
- Appointed: 8 January 1459
- Term ended: 18 October 1477
- Predecessor: Reginald Pecock
- Successor: Edward Story
- Previous post: Archdeacon of Richmond

Orders
- Consecration: 3 June 1459

Personal details
- Died: 18 October 1477

John Arundel (or Arundell; died 1477) was a medieval Bishop of Chichester.

== Biography ==
A native of Cornwall, Arundel was a fellow of Exeter College, Oxford, from 1421 to 1430, and served as university proctor in 1426. He was domestic chaplain and confessor to King Henry VI, who exerted influence on his behalf to gain him preferment in the Church, though without conspicuous success. He became precentor of Hereford in 1432, and archdeacon of Richmond in 1457, and also held prebends from Wells, Lincoln, Lichfield, Hereford, York and St Paul's; but the king failed in his attempts to have Arundel named Bishop of Durham.

He was a Canon of Windsor from 1449 - 1459.

Arundel was nominated to the see of Chichester on 8 January 1459, and consecrated on 3 June 1459. He died on 18 October 1477, and was buried in Chichester Cathedral.

== Citations ==
Catholic Church titles
Preceded by Reginald Pecock	Bishop of Chichester; 1459–1477	Succeeded by Edward Story
