= John Diggle =

English Anglican bishop (1847–1920)

The Right Reverend John Diggle
- Bishop of Carlisle
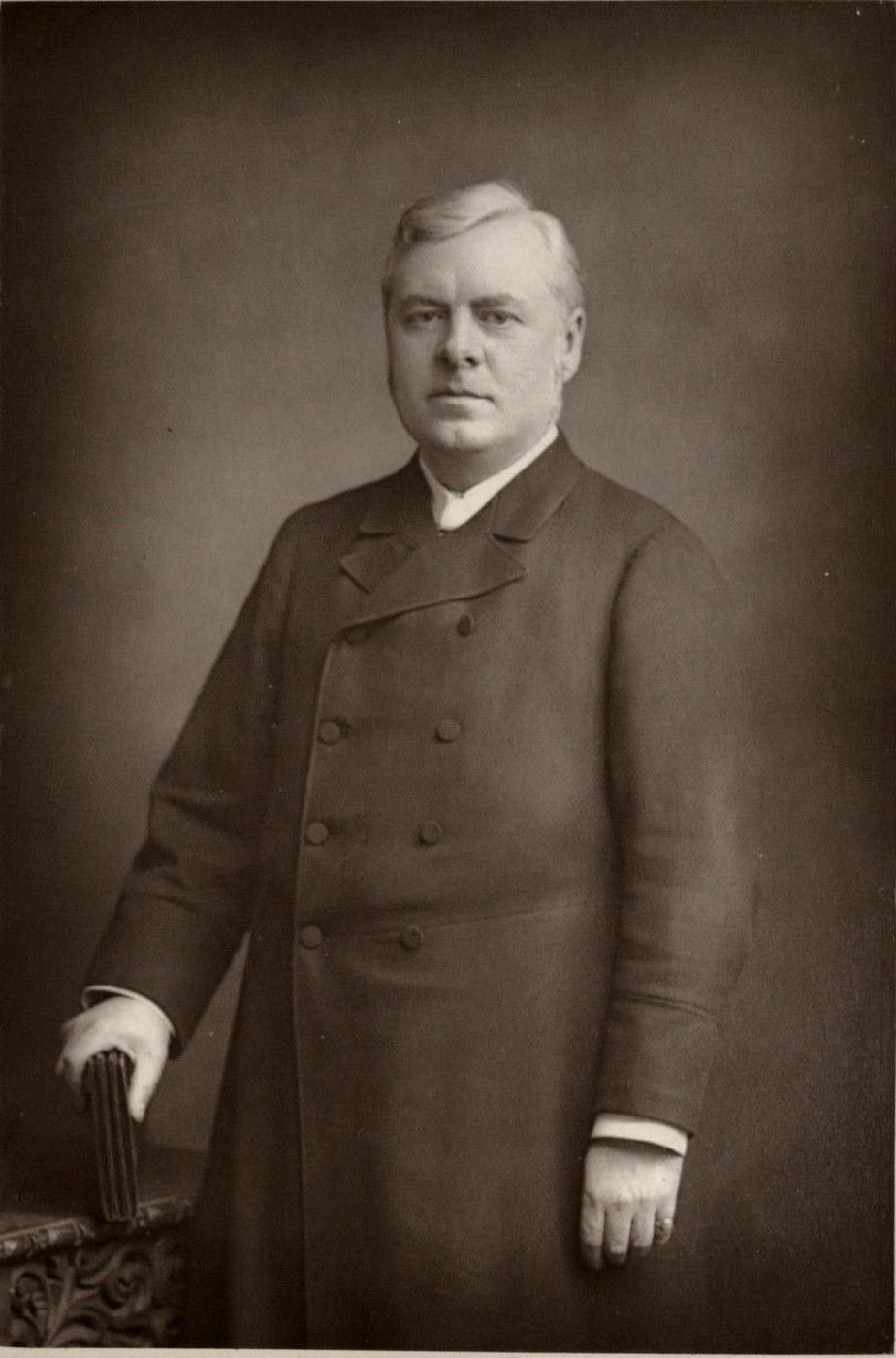
- Church: Church of England
- Diocese: Diocese of Carlisle
- In office: 1905 to 1920
- Predecessor: John Bardsley
- Successor: Henry Williams

Orders
- Ordination: 1871
- Consecration: c. 1905

Personal details
- Born: John William Diggle; 2 March 1847
- Died: 24 March 1920 (aged 73)
- Denomination: Anglicanism
- Children: Five, including Percy Robert Diggle

John William Diggle (2 March 1847 – 24 March 1920) was an English Anglican bishop. He was Archdeacon of Westmorland from 1896 to 1901, Archdeacon of Birmingham from 1903 to 1904, and Bishop of Carlisle from 1905 to his death in 1920.

== Early life and education ==
Diggle was the son of William Diggle, a warehouseman of Pendleton, Lancashire and his wife Nancy Ann née Chadderton. His younger brother, Joseph Diggle (1849–1917) was to become chairman of the London School Board. He was educated at Manchester Grammar School. and Merton College, Oxford.

== Ordained ministry ==
Diggle began his career with curacies at St Margaret, Whalley Range, All Saints’, Liverpool and St John's, Walton. From 1875 until 1897 he was Vicar of Mossley Hill. He was in 1896 collated Archdeacon of Westmorland, serving until November 1901, and then in 1903 Archdeacon of Birmingham.

In 1905, Diggle was appointed Bishop of Carlisle, the diocesan bishop of the Diocese of Carlisle. He was one of the most vociferous episcopal supporters of British involvement in the Great War. He blamed Prussian militarism and was appalled at what he regarded as German cruelty to Belgian and French civilians who had been overrun in the German advance. He regarded it as a spiritual war, the 'Good'of Britain and her allies facing the wickedness of Germany and, therefore, fighting for a choice between '...public law or military licence...freedom or absolutism, independence or servitude, truth or falsehood, purity or corruption, faith or force, love or hate, Christ or Beliel...' He was very proud of clergy and their families who were especially active in the War. These included his own sons, Reginald, who won a MC as a chaplain, and Philip, who was a major in the Border Regiment;and Theodore Hardy, vicar of Hutton Roof, who was awarded the VC. His assistant, the Bishop of Barrow-in-Furness, who volunteered as a Chaplain and served with the Church Army, and the Vicar of Ambleside, who worked in a munitions factory during the week and returned to his parish at weekends to take services, were praised. Unlike most of his colleagues, he refused to forbid his clergy from joining the forces as combatants, writing 'If it is wrong for a clergyman to enlist, can he encourage others to enlist? If we honour and praise the dead for a sacred cause how can it be wrong for clergy to enlist in so noble a cause?'. Diggle also refused to accept candidates for ordination if they were 'of military age and medically fit at this critical juncture in the nation's needs'. One of Diggle's last tasks was to join President Wilson of the US in the nonconformist chapel where Wilson's ancestors had worshipped, and was widely criticised since he was a CofE bishop. Diggle was unmoved and wanted to welcome the President on his visit to the diocese. Diggle continued as bishop until his death on 24 March 1920.

== Personal life ==
In 1874, Diggle married Cicely Jane Butterfield. In 1884, Diggle married Edith Moss. Diggle had five children: four sons and one daughter.

His son, Percy Robert Diggle, was a rugby union international, representing the Combined British on the 1910 RFU tour to Argentina, an early incarnation of the British and Irish Lions.

Church of England titles
Preceded by John Bardsley	Bishop of Carlisle; 1905–1920	Succeeded by Henry Williams
