= William Percy (bishop) =

15th-century Bishop of Carlisle

- Bishop of Carlisle
- Appointed: 30 August 1452
- Term ended: 26 April 1462
- Predecessor: Nicholas Close
- Successor: John Kingscote

Orders
- Consecration: between 16 November and 18 December 1452

Personal details
- Born: 7 April 1428
- Died: 26 April 1462 (aged 34)
- Denomination: Catholic

William Percy (7 April 1428 at Alnwick Castle – 26 April 1462) was a late medieval Bishop of Carlisle. He was the fifth son of Henry Percy, 2nd Earl of Northumberland, and his wife Lady Eleanor Neville. Percy was in 1451 appointed to be Chancellor of the University of Cambridge, a post he held until 1456. He was selected 30 August 1452 to be Bishop of Carlisle following the appointment of his predecessor Nicholas Close to the Bishopric of Coventry and Lichfield. Percy was consecrated between 16 November and 18 December 1452. He died on 26 April 1462.

== Citations ==
Catholic Church titles
Preceded by Nicholas Close	Bishop of Carlisle; 1452–1462	Succeeded by John Kingscote
