= Richard Bell (bishop) =

15th-century Bishop of Carlisle

- Bishop of Carlisle
- Appointed: 11 February 1478
- Term ended: 4 September 1495
- Predecessor: Edward Story
- Successor: William Senhouse

Orders
- Consecration: 26 April 1478

Personal details
- Died: 1496
- Denomination: Catholic

Richard Bell (died 1496) was a Bishop of Carlisle. He was selected 11 February 1478, and consecrated 26 April 1478. He resigned the see on 4 September 1495, and died in 1496. He had previously served as Warden of Durham College, Oxford from 1450-53 and Prior of Finchale from 1457 to 1464.

== Citations ==
Catholic Church titles
Preceded by Edward Story	Bishop of Carlisle; 1478–1495	Succeeded by William Senhouse
