= John Best (bishop) =

John Best (died 1570) was Bishop of Carlisle from 1560 until his death.

== Background ==
He was from Halifax and attended King Henry VIII's College from 1538 to 1539.

== Personal life and career ==
In 1550 he married Elizabeth Somner. In 1553 Best was canon of Wells and in 1559 he was made Rector of Romaldkirk. He was consecrated Bishop of Carlisle on 2 March 1561, after the previous Bishop had been deprived of his see, after performing Elizabeth I's coronation in Roman Catholic liturgy despite Elizabeth's Protestant faith.

== Death ==
Best died in 1570, nine years after being consecrated Bishop of Carlisle.

== Notes ==
Church of England titles
Preceded by Owen Oglethorpe	Bishop of Carlisle; 1560–1570	Succeeded by Richard Barnes
