= Silvester de Everdon =

13th-century Bishop of Carlisle and Chancellor of England

- Bishop of Carlisle
- Elected: November 1246
- Term ended: Spring 1254
- Predecessor: Walter Mauclerk
- Successor: Thomas Vipont
- Other post: Archdeacon of Chester

Orders
- Consecration: 13 October 1247

Personal details
- Died: Spring 1254 Northampton

Lord Chancellor
- In office 1244–1246
- Monarch: Henry III of England
- Preceded by: Ralph Neville
- Succeeded by: John Maunsell

Silvester de Everdon (died 1254) was a Bishop of Carlisle and Lord Chancellor of England.

== Life ==
Everdon came from the village of Everdon, near Daventry in Northamptonshire, but other than the fact that he was related to a locally prominent family of Thorp, nothing else is known of his ancestry. He was a priest in Northamptonshire from 1219. In 1229 he entered the service of Ralph Neville, who was Bishop of Chichester and Lord Chancellor, as a chancery clerk and continued on in the chancery until his election to Carlisle. In 1244 Everdon became Lord Chancellor (holding the post until 1246) and in 1245 he became the Archdeacon of Chester. He was elected to the see of Carlisle about 1 September 1246 but declined the see. He probably declined the see because of concerns over being rewarded for secular work with a clerical office.

King Henry III of England seems to have persuaded Everdon that election was canonical, and he was elected again in November 1246 and accepted. Earlier, Matthew Paris had described Silvester as "the king's faithful clerk, dear and close, obtaining the first place in the chancery, where he served him wisely" and certainly Henry would have had the ability to persuade Silvester to accept the bishopric. He was consecrated on 13 October 1247. During his time as bishop, he worked to settle a long-standing dispute over the finances of the see between the bishop and the canons. He also served as a royal justice and attended parliament. He died in the spring of 1254, after being thrown from a horse near Northampton while on his way to the royal court.

Everdon is believed to be buried in the Temple Church in London.

== Citations ==
Political offices
Preceded by Ralph Neville	Lord Chancellor; 1244–1246	Succeeded by John Maunsell
Catholic Church titles
Preceded by Walter Mauclerk	Bishop of Carlisle; 1246–1254	Succeeded by Thomas Vipont
