= Gilbert Welton =

14th-century Bishop of Carlisle

- Bishop of Carlisle
- Appointed: 13 February 1353
- Term ended: November or December 1362
- Predecessor: John Horncastle
- Successor: Thomas Appleby

Orders
- Consecration: 21 April 1353

Personal details
- Died: November or December 1362
- Denomination: Catholic

Gilbert Welton (or Gilbert de Wilton) was a Bishop of Carlisle. He was selected on 13 February 1353, and consecrated 21 April 1353. He died in November or December 1362.

== Citations ==
Catholic Church titles
Preceded by John Horncastle	Bishop of Carlisle; 1353–1362	Succeeded by Thomas Appleby
