= Nicholas Close =

15th-century Bishop of Carlisle and Bishop of Coventry and Lichfield

- Bishop of Coventry and Lichfield
- Appointed: 30 August 1452
- Term ended: late October 1452
- Predecessor: William Booth
- Successor: Reginald Boulers
- Previous posts: Bishop of Carlisle; Archdeacon of Colchester

Orders
- Consecration: 15 March 1450

Personal details
- Died: late October 1452
- Denomination: Roman Catholic

Nicholas Close (died 1452) was an English priest.

Close is widely regarded as having been born in Westmorland, in Birkbeck Fells, but may have been of Flemish descent. He was educated at King's College, Cambridge, being elected a fellow in 1443, one of the first six fellows on the foundation. He held the curacy of St John Zachary, a church demolished to make way for King's College Chapel, the construction of which he was appointed overseer by Henry VI.

== Career ==
He served as a commissioner to Scotland in 1449. He was provided to the see of Carlisle in January 1450, and consecrated on 15 March 1450. On 19 March he was granted an indult from the King "for life and as long as he is bishop of Carlisle, to visit his city and diocese by deputy (he being hindered so much by the service of Henry, king of England that he cannot conveniently do so in person)."

Also in 1450 he was elected to the then annual position of Chancellor of the University of Cambridge. He was Bishop of Carlisle from 1450 to 1452, and was then translated to Bishop of Coventry and Lichfield on 30 August 1452, serving for a short time before his death in late October 1452.

== Citations ==
Academic offices
Preceded by Robert Ascogh	Chancellor of the University of Cambridge; 1450-1451	Succeeded by William Percy
Catholic Church titles
Preceded by Marmaduke Lumley	Bishop of Carlisle; 1450–1452	Succeeded by William Percy
Preceded by William Booth	Bishop of Coventry and Lichfield; 1452–1453	Succeeded by Reginald Boulers
