= Robert Aldrich (bishop) =

Robert Aldrich or Aldridge (died March 1555) was Bishop of Carlisle in the reigns of Henry VIII, Edward VI, and Mary I.

Richard Aldrich was born at Burnham, Buckinghamshire, and educated at Eton and Cambridge.

In 1534 he was appointed Canon of the tenth stall at St George's Chapel, Windsor Castle, a position he held until 1537.

He was consecrated bishop of Carlisle on 18 July 1537. He became in 1534 register of the order of the Garter, in the room of Dr. Richard Sydnor, archdeacon of Totnes. He was praised by Erasmus, while he was a fellow of King's College, as a young man of eloquence; and Leland, the antiquary, who was his friend, has celebrated him in a copy of Latin verses. He was both master and provost of Eton; but in 1529 he retired to Oxford and was incorporated B.D. and afterwards proceeded D.D. in that university. He died in 1555 at Horncastle in Lincolnshire.

== Works ==
His principal works are the following.

- Epistola ad Gwielmum Hormannum
- Epigrammata varia
- Several Resolutions concerning the Sacraments
- Answers to certain Queries concerning the Abuses of the Mass

== In balladry and popular culture ==
Walter Scott and others have identified Aldrich as the bishop in the 17th century ballad Hughie Graham, of which several variants have been collected.

== Sources ==
Church of England titles
Preceded by John Kite	Bishop of Carlisle; 1537–1556	Succeeded by Owen Oglethorpe
