= Reginald Boulers =

15th-century Bishop of Coventry and Lichfield and Bishop of Hereford

Reginald Boulers O.S.B., D.Th.
- Bishop of Coventry and Lichfield
- Appointed: 7 February 1453
- Term ended: between 24 March and 10 April 1459
- Predecessor: Nicholas Close
- Successor: John Hales
- Previous posts: Abbot of Gloucester; Bishop of Hereford

Orders
- Consecration: 14 February 1451

Personal details
- Died: between 24 March and 10 April 1459
- Denomination: Roman Catholic Church

Reginald Boulers (died 1459) was a medieval Abbot of Gloucester, Bishop of Hereford and Bishop of Coventry and Lichfield.

Boulers became abbot of the abbey of St Peter at Gloucester in 1437. Boulers was a shrewd man of affairs and was sent on an embassy to Rome in 1449, when the convent allowed him £400 for his expenses. In 1450, he was seized by Richard Plantagenet, 3rd Duke of York, and imprisoned for a time in Ludlow Castle. In the same year, Boulers was appointed to the See of Hereford on 14 August 1450 and consecrated on 14 February 1451. He was translated to the see of Coventry and Lichfield on 7 February 1453.

Shortly before his death he willed his books to the library at Gloucester Abbey. Boulers died in office sometime between 24 March and 10 April 1459.

== Citations ==
Catholic Church titles
Preceded by John Morwent	Abbot of Gloucester; 1437–1450	Succeeded by Thomas Sebroke
Preceded by Richard Beauchamp	Bishop of Hereford; 1450–1453	Succeeded by John Stanberry
Preceded by Nicholas Close	Bishop of Coventry and Lichfield; 1453–1459	Succeeded by John Hales
