= Robert de Chauncy =

13th-century Bishop of Carlisle

- Bishop of Carlisle
- Elected: c. 12 February 1257
- Term ended: October 1278
- Predecessor: Thomas Vipont
- Successor: William de Rotherfeld
- Other post: Archdeacon of Bath

Orders
- Consecration: 14 April 1258

Personal details
- Died: October 1278
- Buried: Carlisle Cathedral

Robert de Chauncy (Note: Or Robert de Chaury, Robert Chaury, or Robert Chause) (died 1278) was a medieval Bishop of Carlisle.

== Life ==
Chauncy's family probably came from Chawreth in Essex, from which he took his name. Beyond the fact that he was illegitimate, nothing else is known of his background. He was probably controller of the queen's wardrobe for Queen Eleanor by April 1243. He was named rector of Badsworth on 26 January 1255 and was named as Archdeacon of Bath between 26 January 1255 and 22 January 1257

Following the death of Thomas Vipont, the cathedral chapter of Carlisle Cathedral first elected Robert of St Agatha, who refused the office. The chapter then elected Chauncy, who was a royal clerk as well as holding the above ecclesiastical offices. He was elected to the see of Carlisle about 12 February 1257, and consecrated on 14 April 1258. He received a dispensation for illegitimacy from Pope Alexander IV on 19 June 1257.

Chauncy remained in the king's service and went with the king to France in 1259. He was also with the king when Henry was held captive by Simon de Montfort in 1264. However, he never gained the favor of King Edward I, Henry's successor, although he served for two years at the start of his reign as Sheriff of Cumberland. Chauncy was active in the affairs of his diocese, working to improve the morals of the laity and the clergy alike. He died in September or October 1278. He was buried in Carlisle Cathedral, and his tomb survived the fire in that church in 1292.

== Citations ==
Catholic Church titles
Preceded by Thomas Vipont	Bishop of Carlisle; 1257–1278	Succeeded by William de Rotherfeld
