= Paulinus of Leeds =

12th-century Bishop of Carlisle-elect

- Bishop of Carlisle-elect
- Appointed: 1186
- Term ended: declined election 1186
- Predecessor: Æthelwold of Carlisle
- Successor: Bernard
- Other post: master of St Leonard's Hospital

Paulinus was the master of St. Leonard's Hospital in Yorkshire before he was nominated to be Bishop of Carlisle. He was nominated in 1186, but declined the see.

== Citations ==
Catholic Church titles
Preceded by Æthelwold of Carlisle	Bishop of Carlisle; 1186; Declined election	Succeeded by Bernard
