= Reginald Pecock =

15th-century Bishop of Chichester and Bishop of St Asaph

- Bishop of Chichester
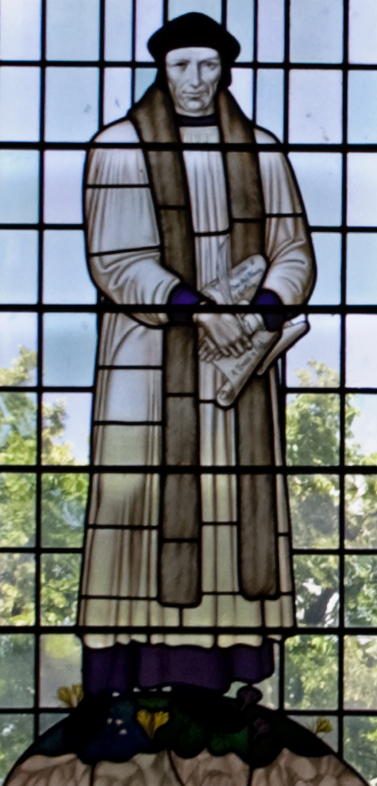
- Appointed: 23 March 1450
- Term ended: about 1461
- Predecessor: Adam Moleyns
- Successor: John Arundel
- Previous post: Bishop of St. Asaph

Orders
- Ordination: 1421
- Consecration: 14 June 1444

Personal details
- Died: c. 1461 Thorney Abbey
- Denomination: Catholic

Reginald Pecock (or Peacock; c. 1395 – c. 1461) was a Welsh prelate, scholastic, and writer.

== Life ==
Pecock was probably born in Laugharne and was educated at Oriel College, Oxford.

Having been ordained a priest of the Catholic Church in 1421, Pecock secured a mastership at Whittington College, London, in 1431 where he was also parish priest of St. Michael Paternoster Royal, the adjacent parish church. On 14 June 1444 he was consecrated as Bishop of St Asaph, and translated as Bishop of Chichester on 23 March 1450. In 1454 he became a member of the privy council.

He wrote books of both a pedagogical and polemical nature. His pedagogical books, in which he proposes a wholly new catechism include The Donet, The Follower to the Donet, and The Rule of Christian Religion. He joined the debate on Christian doctrine in his Repressing of Over Mich Wyting [blaming] the Clergie, 1449, and Book of Faith, 1456. These were both more cogent than the Lollard tenets, and sought to stay the Lollard movement by setting aside ecclesiastical infallibility, and taking the appeal to Scripture and reason alone. It was principally Pecock's appeal to reason and his attack on the primacy of episcopal authority for which he was deprived in 1458.

In attacking the Lollards, Pecock put forward the following religious views: he asserted that the Scriptures were not the only standard of right and wrong; he questioned some of the articles of the creed and the infallibility of the Church; he wished "bi cleer witte drawe men into consente of trewe feith otherwise than bi fire and swerd or hangement" and in general he exalted the authority of reason. Owing to these views, the archbishop of Canterbury, Thomas Bourchier, ordered his writings to be examined. This was done and he was found guilty of heresy.

Pecock was removed from the privy council and he publicly (at St Paul's Cross, 4 December 1457), renounced his opinions in accordance with his previously stated opinion about the need for obedience in all matters to the Church hierarchy. Pecock, who has been called "the most prolific English theologian of the 15th century", was then forced to resign his bishopric in January 1459, and was removed to Thorney Abbey in Cambridgeshire, where he doubtless remained until his death about 1461.

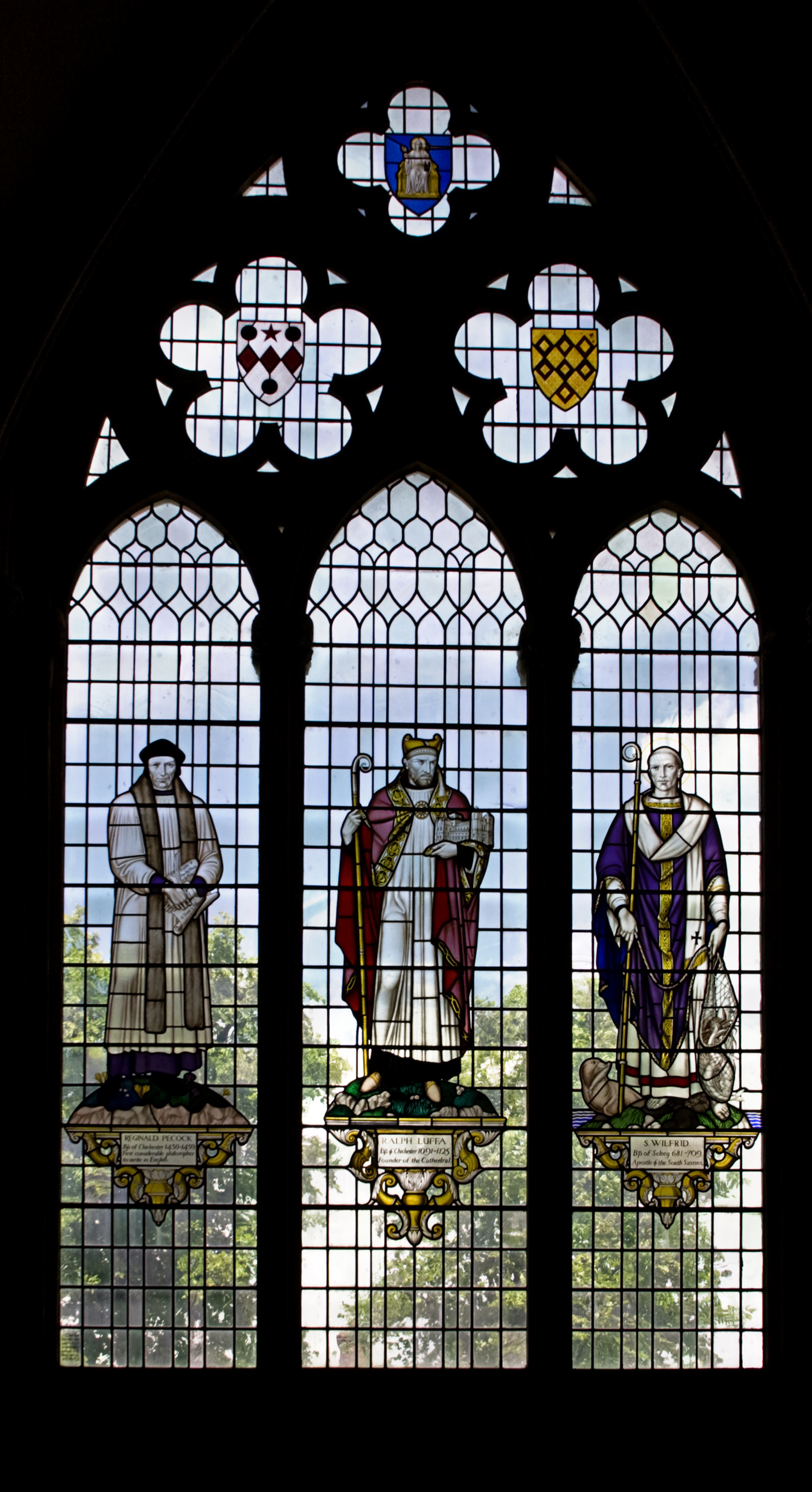
Stained glass window in Chichester Cathedral depicting Reginald Peacock, Ralph of Luffa and Wilfrid, all Bishops of Chichester

The bishop's chief work is the well-known Represser of over-much weeting [blaming] of the Clergie, which was issued c. 1449–1455. In addition to its importance to the history of the Lollard movement, the Represser is also an early language model of Middle English, Pecock being one of the first to use the vernacular.

A biography of Pecock is added to the edition of the Repressor published by Churchill Babington for the Rolls Series in 1860.

== Extant works ==
- The Repressing of Over Mich Wyting of the Clergie (The Repressor of Over Much Blaming of the Clergy),(1449); ed.Churchill Babington; Longman, Green and Roberts, (2 vols, London, 1860).
- The Book of Faith (1456), ed. J. L. Morison, (Glasgow, 1909).
- The Donet, ed. E. V. Hitchcock, (London, 1921).
- The Follower of the Donet, ed. E. V. Hitchcock (Oxford, 1971).
- The Reule of Crysten Religioun, by Reginald Pecock ... now first edited from Pierpont Morgan Ms. 519, by William Cabell Greet; London, H. Milford, Oxford University Press, 1927; & New York, 1971); Millwood, N.Y., Kraus Reprint, 1987.

== Citations ==
Catholic Church titles
Preceded by John Lowe	Bishop of St. Asaph; 1444–1450	Succeeded by Thomas Bird
Preceded by Adam Moleyns	Bishop of Chichester; 1450–1459	Succeeded by John Arundel
