= Richard Milbourne =

English bishop (died 1624)

Richard Milbourne (died 1624) was an English bishop.

== Life ==
He was born in London, and educated at Winchester School and Queens' College, Cambridge, where he matriculated in 1579, and graduated B.A. in 1582. He was Fellow of Queens' from 1582 to 1593. He became rector of Sevenoaks, Kent in 1607 (or 1611), of Cheam, Surrey, and vicar of Goudhurst, Kent. He was Dean of Rochester in 1611, and chaplain to Henry Frederick, Prince of Wales.

He became Bishop of St David's in 1615 and Bishop of Carlisle in 1621.

== Notes ==
Church of England titles
Preceded by Anthony Rudd	Bishop of St David's; 1616–1621	Succeeded by William Laud
Preceded by Robert Snoden	Bishop of Carlisle; 1621–1624	Succeeded by Richard Senhouse
