= Edward Story =

5th and 16th-century Bishop of Carlisle and Bishop of Chichester

- Bishop of Chichester
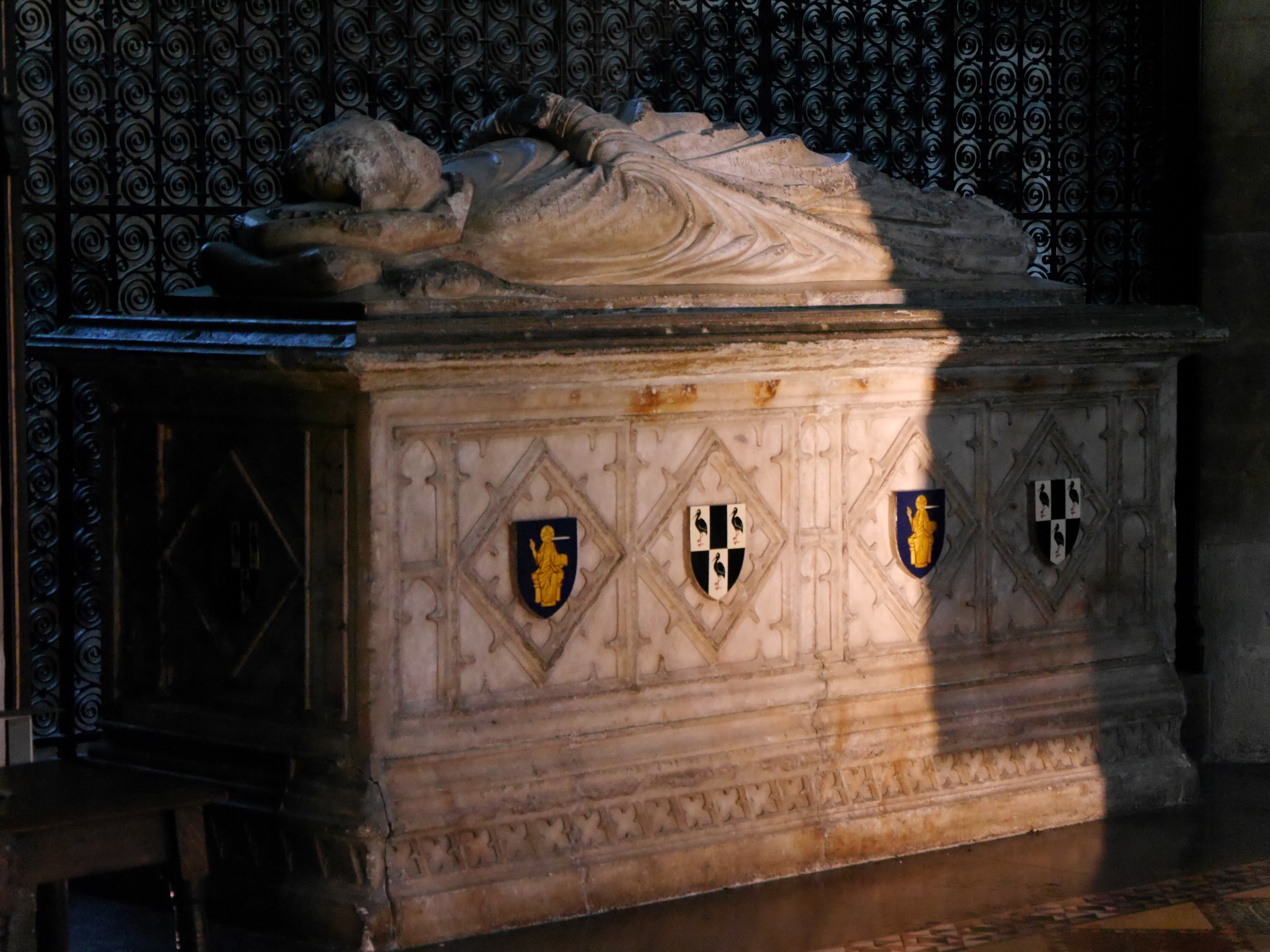
- Bishop Story's Tomb at Chichester Cathedral
- Appointed: 11 February 1478
- Term ended: 16 March 1503
- Predecessor: John Arundel
- Successor: Richard FitzJames
- Previous post: Bishop of Carlisle

Orders
- Consecration: 2 October 1468

Personal details
- Died: 16 March 1503
- Denomination: Roman Catholic

Edward Story (or Storey; died 1503) was an English priest, Bishop of Carlisle, 1468–1477, and Bishop of Chichester, 1477–1503.

Story was educated at Pembroke Hall, Cambridge, where he was elected a fellow about 1444. In 1450, he was appointed Master of Michaelhouse, Cambridge, a post he held together with his later preferments until 1477. Advanced to the see of Carlisle by papal provision on 18 July 1468, he was consecrated a bishop on 2 October 1468. He was translated to Chichester on 11 February 1478. He served as chaplain to Elizabeth Woodville and as Chancellor of Cambridge University. He founded the Prebendal School in Chichester, and he is reputed to have had the Chichester Cross erected.

Story died on 16 March 1503. His death is recorded in the Lewkenor Hours (Lambeth Palace Library MS 545), the book of hours once owned by the wealthy Lewkenor family of Tratton and Tangmere (Sussex).

== Citations ==
Catholic Church titles
Preceded by Richard Scroope	Bishop of Carlisle; 1468–1477	Succeeded by Richard Bell
Preceded by John Arundel	Bishop of Chichester; 1477–1503	Succeeded by Richard FitzJames
