= Richard Scroope =

15th-century Bishop of Carlisle

- Bishop of Carlisle
- Appointed: 1 February 1464
- Term ended: 10 May 1468
- Predecessor: John Kingscote
- Successor: Edward Story

Orders
- Consecration: 24 June 1464

Personal details
- Died: 10 May 1468
- Denomination: Catholic

Richard Scroope (Note: Or Richard Scrope or Richard le Scrope) was the Bishop of Carlisle. He was selected on 1 February 1464 and consecrated on 24 June. He died 10 May 1468.

== Citations ==
Catholic Church titles
Preceded by John Kingscote	Bishop of Carlisle; 1464–1468	Succeeded by Edward Story
