= Owen Oglethorpe =

Academic and bishop (1502–1559)

The Right Reverend Owen Oglethorpe
- Bishop of Carlisle
- Church: Catholic
- Appointed: 24 March 1557
- Term ended: 26 June 1559
- Predecessor: Robert Aldrich
- Successor: John Best

Orders
- Consecration: 15 August 1557 by Nicholas Heath

Personal details
- Born: c. 1502 Tadcaster, Yorkshire, England
- Died: 31 December 1559
- Buried: St Dunstan-in-the-West

Owen Oglethorpe (c. 1502 – 31 December 1559) was an English academic and Bishop of Carlisle, 1557–1559.

== Childhood and Education ==
Oglethorpe was born in Tadcaster, Yorkshire, England (where he later founded a school), the third son of George Oglethorpe. He studied at Magdalen College, Oxford, where he was elected a Fellow in 1524. He completed his BA in 1525, received his MA in 1529, and his BTh and DTh in 1536. He was reputed to have taken a keen interest in his studies.

== Career ==
Oglethorpe was appointed a Junior Proctor at Oxford University in 1533. He served as President of Magdalen from 1536 to 1552, was Vice-Chancellor of Oxford for 1551–1552, and was again President of Magdalen from 1553 to 1555. In addition to being one of Henry VIII's chaplains, he was also a canon of both Christ Church, Oxford, and St. George's Chapel, Windsor (1540–1553). In 1541 he was appointed Rector of Romaldkirk in the newly created Diocese of Chester. The exact date is not recorded but he was appointed by Henry VIII himself. He was deprived of the freehold of the living on 4 August 1559 (just over a month after being deprived of his See for failing to take the Oath of Supremacy to Elizabeth I).

Oglethorpe was unpopular with the 'reformers' at Oxford, and he was forced to resign his university offices during the reign of Edward VI. His fortunes changed under Mary I, and was appointed Dean of Windsor and Registrar of the Order of the Garter, serving from 1553 to 1556.

== Bishop of Carlisle ==
Oglethorpe was consecrated Bishop of Carlisle on 15 August 1557 alongside Thomas Watson, Bishop of Lincoln, and David Poole, Bishop of Peterborough.

When Mary I died on 17 November 1558, she was succeeded by her half-sister, Elizabeth I. Oglethorpe was chosen (for unknown reasons) to celebrate Elizabeth's Christmas Day mass in the Chapel Royal of St James's Palace. Oglethorpe refused Elizabeth's instruction to not elevate the host at its consecration (an action that implied the corporeal presence of Christ). According to a letter sent by Don Aloisio Schivenoglia to Ottaviano Vivaldino, the Mantuan ambassador, Oglethorpe remained adamant that he could not alter the service, as it was against both his conscience and his training. So, after the gospel had been read, Elizabeth walked out of the service to avoid witnessing the elevation of the host. It remains unclear as to why Oglethorpe was presiding at the service (the Queen's chaplains usually presided at services in the chapel), especially as the way Schivenoglia describes the event, Elizabeth was pre-warned that Oglethorpe would elevate the host, meaning that she could have found a different presider.

For reasons that scholars have never been able to explain, and despite his 'performance' at the Christmas Day mass, Oglethorpe presided at Elizabeth's coronation only a few weeks later. As was traditional, the coronation took place in Westminster Abbey, on 15 January 1559. Oglethorpe greeted Elizabeth in Westminster Hall, and sprinkled her with holy water. Then, during the service itself, Elizabeth was anointed and invested with the sacred regalia. She was crowned three times: with the crown of St Edward, the imperial state crown, and a third crown (which had likely been made for Mary's coronation). Then she swore the coronation oath, which included the distinctly Protestant promise to rule according to "true profession of the Gospel established in this Kingdom". All of this was administered or performed by Oglethorpe. The service, however, was celebrated by George Carew, the newly installed Dean of the Royal Chapel. Carew's designation as celebrant was likely to prevent Oglethorpe elevating the host, and to allow the epistle and the gospel to be read in English.

After Parliament passed the Elizabethan Religious Settlement, the Church of England became formally Protestant. Oglethorpe refused to swear the required Oath of Supremacy, and was deprived of his See on 26 June 1559.

After his deprivation, Oglethorpe remained in London under loose house arrest. He drew up his will on 10 November 1559, and died on 31 December 1559. He was buried in St Dunstan-in-the-West Church, Fleet Street, on 6 January 1560.

== Sources ==
- Clark, Margaret. "Oglethorpe, Owen (1502/3–1559)." Oxford Dictionary of National Biography. 2008.
- Norrie, Aidan. “The Bishop and the Queen; Or, Why Did the Bishop of Carlisle Crown Elizabeth I?” Northern History 56, nos. 1–2 (2019): 25–45.

Academic offices
| Preceded by Thomas Knollys | President of Magdalen College, Oxford; 1536–1552 | Succeeded by Walter Haddon |
| Preceded by William Tresham | Vice-Chancellor of Oxford University; 1551–1552 | Succeeded by James Brokes alias Brooks |
| Preceded by Walter Haddon | President of Magdalen College, Oxford; 1553–1555 | Succeeded by Arthur Cole |
Church of England titles
| Preceded by Robert Aldrich | Bishop of Carlisle; 1557–1559 | Succeeded by John Best |
