= Bretherdale Head =

Hamlet in Cumbria, England

Coordinates: 54.439°N 2.656°W

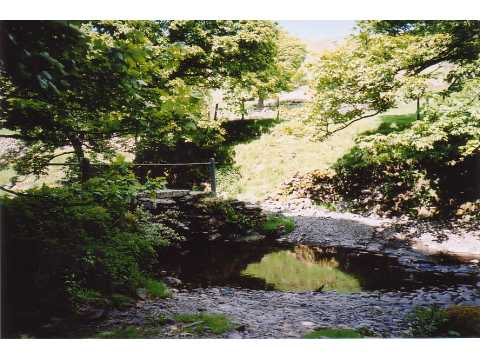
- Ford across Bretherdale Beck, Bretherdale Head

- Location in former Eden District, Cumbria Location within Cumbria
- OS grid reference: NY574050
- Civil parish: Orton
- Unitary authority: Westmorland and Furness
- Ceremonial county: Cumbria
- Region: North West
- Country: England
- Sovereign state: United Kingdom
- Post town: PENRITH
- Postcode district: CA10
- Dialling code: 015396
- Police: Cumbria
- Fire: Cumbria
- Ambulance: North West
- UK Parliament: Westmorland and Lonsdale

Bretherdale Head is a hamlet in Cumbria, England. Meaning "Valley of the Brother", it was referred to as Britherdal in the 12th century.
