= John Horncastle =

14th-century Bishop of Carlisle-elect

- Bishop of Carlisle
- Elected: about 10 January 1353
- Term ended: about 26 June 1353 (quashed)
- Predecessor: John Kirkby
- Successor: Gilbert Welton

Personal details
- Denomination: Catholic

John Horncastle (or John de Horncastle) was a Bishop of Carlisle. He was elected about 10 January 1353 but was never consecrated as his election was quashed about 26 June 1353.

== Citations ==
Catholic Church titles
Preceded by John Kirkby	Bishop of Carlisle election quashed 1353	Succeeded by Gilbert Welton
