= Bishop of Carlisle =

Diocesan bishop in the Church of England

- Bishopric

anglican
- Coat of arms
- Incumbent; Robert Saner-Haigh

Location
- Ecclesiastical province: York
- Residence: Bishop's House, Keswick (since 2009); Rose Castle, Dalston (until 2009)

Information
- First holder: Æthelwold
- Established: 1133
- Diocese: Carlisle
- Cathedral: Carlisle Cathedral

The Bishop of Carlisle is the Ordinary of the Church of England Diocese of Carlisle in the Province of York.

The diocese covers the county of Cumbria except for Alston Moor and the former Sedbergh Rural District. The see is in the city of Carlisle where the seat is located at the Cathedral Church of the Holy and Undivided Trinity which was a collegiate church until elevated to cathedral status in 1133.

The diocese was created in 1133 by Henry I out of part of the Diocese of Durham. It was extended in 1856 taking over part of the Diocese of Chester. The residence of the bishop was Rose Castle, Dalston, until 2009. The bishop now resides at Bishop's House, Keswick.

The current bishop is Rob Saner-Haigh, who was translated from Penrith on 1 September 2025 — the confirmation of his election.

== History ==
=== Early times ===
The original territory of the diocese first became a political unit in the reign of King William Rufus (1087–1100), who made it into the Earldom of Carlisle, which covered most of the counties of Cumberland and Westmorland. In 1133, during the reign of his successor, Henry I, a diocese was erected in the territory of the earldom, the territory being subtracted from the Diocese of Durham. This happened despite there being locally a strong Celtic element that looked to Glasgow for episcopal administration. As the first bishop, the king secured the appointment of his former confessor, Æthelwulf (1133–1155), an Englishman, Prior of the Augustinian Canons, whom he had established at Carlisle in 1102, though at the time of his consecration Æthelwulf seems to have been Prior of the Augustinian house at Nostell in Yorkshire. An efficient administrator, he ruled the diocese until his death in 1156 and succeeded in imparting a certain vigour to diocesan life. Among other initiatives, he built a moderate-sized Norman minster of which the transepts and part of the nave still exist. To serve this cathedral he introduced his own Augustinian brethren, with the result that Carlisle was the only see in England with an Augustinian cathedral chapter, the other monastic cathedral chapters in England consisting of Benedictine monks. There was only one archdeaconry, that of Carlisle.

Of the next bishop, Bernard, little is known, and after his death, in or about 1186, there was a long vacancy, during which the diocese was administered by another Bernard, Archbishop of Ragusa. During this period Carlisle suffered severely from the incursions of the Scots, and early in the reign of Henry III the king complained to the Pope that Carlisle had revolted in favour of Scotland, and that the canons had elected a bishop for themselves. The reigning papal legate, Philip of Dreux, punished this action by exiling the canons and appointing Hugh, Abbot of Beaulieu, a good administrator, as bishop.

It was important to the English government to have a reliable prelate at Carlisle, as they constantly looked to the bishop to attend to Scottish affairs, negotiate treaties, and generally play the part of diplomat. The next bishop was Walter Malclerk, formerly agent of King John, and a prominent figure in the reign of Henry III. Always a patron of the Friars Preachers, he introduced both Dominicans and Franciscans into the city and diocese. He resigned his see in 1246 in order to join the Order of St. Dominic. About this time a new choir was begun and carried to completion, only to be destroyed in the great fire of 1292.

A fresh beginning was made by the energetic Bishop John de Halton (1292–1324), a favourite of Edward I, and for nearly a hundred years the building of the present choir proceeded, though with many interruptions. Its chief glory is the great East window, remarkable both for its own beauty and as marking a transition from the earlier style to the perfection of tracery. During this time the see was governed by a line of bishops, busy and useful diplomats in their day, but not remarkable in other respects. Bishop John Kirkby took an active role in Border military actions, defeating a Scottish raid in 1345 and commanding English troops at the battle of Neville's Cross in the following year. Thomas Merke was a close friend of Richard II, who was later tried for high treason under Henry IV and deprived. The subsequent bishops were scholars, frequently employed in negotiating truces and treaties with Scotland, and several of them were Chancellors of Oxford or of Cambridge University.

=== Tudor Period ===
Among this generation of scholar diplomats was Cardinal Thomas Wolsey's friend, John Kite (1521–1537), who remained faithful to his master, and who supported him in the poverty of his latter days.

The last of the bishops in communion with Rome was Owen Oglethorpe, a kindly-tempered man who was prevailed on to crown Elizabeth when no other bishop could be found to do it. This was an act he afterwards much regretted. On Christmas Day after the Queen’s accession he disobeyed the note she sent him in the Chapel Royal forbidding him to elevate the Sacred Host in her presence. His refusal to take the Oath of Supremacy led to his being deprived of his title along with the other bishops, and he died a prisoner 31 December 1559. Under Owen Ogelthorp Carlisle was a poor diocese, and when the Reformers plundered the churches they found little but a chalice in each, and even of these some were of tin.

After Ogelthorp's deprivation and death, Bernard Gilpin was to succeed him in Carlisle but he refused though much pressed to it, the Bishopric was conferred on one John Best, who was consecrated 2 March 1560. Bishop John Best was the first post-Marian Anglican Bishop at Carlisle. Bishop Best was the 31st Bishop of Carlisle from 2 May 1561 to his death on 22 May 1570.

=== Subsequent Centuries ===
The cathedral, originally dedicated to the Blessed Virgin, received its current dedication at the time of the Reformation.

The diocese was extended in 1856 by the addition of part of the Diocese of Chester.

== List of bishops ==
Bishops of Carlisle
From	Until	Incumbent	Notes
1133	1156	Æthelwold	Adelulf; Prior of St Oswald's, Nostell.
1156	1186	See vacant	
1186		Paulinus of Leeds	Master of St. Leonard's hospital, York; elected at Richard I's wish, but declined.
1186	1203	See vacant	
1203	1214	Bernard	Translated from Ragusa by Pope Innocent III; received royal assent 1204.
1214	1218	See vacant	Scottish occupation 1216 to 1217.
1218	1223	Hugh of Beaulieu	Abbot of Beaulieu Abbey.
1223	1246	Walter Mauclerk	Walter Mauclerc; also Lord Treasurer 1227–33; resigned 1246.
1246	1254	Silvester de Everdon	Previously Archdeacon of Chester and Keeper of the Great Seal.
1255	1256	Thomas Vipont	Thomas de Veteri Ponte; previously Rector of Greystoke.
1256		Robert de Sancta Agatha	Previously Archdeacon of Northumberland; elected but declined; later Archdeacon of Durham.
1258	1278	Robert de Chauncy	Robert de Chause; Previously Archdeacon of Bath; chaplain to the queen.
1278		William Langton	William de Langeton or William of Rotherfield; Dean of York; elected but refused.
1280	1292	Ralph of Irton	Ralph de Ireton or Ralph Ireton; Prior of Gisborough Priory.
1292	1324	John de Halton	John de Halghton; Canon of Carlisle.
1325		William Ayremyn	Canon of York; elected 7 Jan 1325, but quashed 13 Feb 1325.
1325	1332	John Ross	John de Rosse or John Ross; son of Lord de Ros. Canon of Hereford; appointed by Pope John XXII.
1332	1352	John Kirkby	John de Kirkeby; Canon of Carlisle.
1352		John Horncastle	John de Horncastle; elected but set aside by Pope Clement VI before consecration.
1353	1362	Gilbert Welton	Gilbert de Wilton.
1363	1395	Thomas Appleby	Thomas de Appleby; Canon of Carlisle.
1396		Robert Reed	Robert Reade; translated from Waterford and Lismore; translated to Chichester.
1397	1400	Thomas Merke	Thomas Merkes or Thomas Merks; deprived and imprisoned 10 January 1400, pardoned the following year, thereafter served as a deputy and acting bishop in Winchester.
1400	1419	William Strickland	
1420	1423	Roger Whelpdale	Provost of Queens' College, Cambridge.
1423	1429	William Barrow	William Barrowe; translated from Bangor.
1429	1449	Marmaduke Lumley	Previously Archdeacon of Northumberland and Chancellor of the University of Cambridge; also Lord Treasurer 1446–9; translated to Lincoln.
1450	1452	Nicholas Close	Previously Archdeacon of Colchester; translated to Lichfield & Coventry.
1452	1462	William Percy	Also Chancellor of the University of Cambridge 1451–6.
1462	1463	John Kingscote	John Kingscotes; previously Archdeacon of Gloucester.
1464	1468	Richard Scroope	Richard Scrope; Rector of Fen-Ditton, Cambridgeshire.
1468	1478	Edward Story	Also Chancellor of the University of Cambridge 1468–9; translated to Chichester.
1478	1495	Richard Bell	Previously Prior of Durham; resigned; died 1496.
1495	1502	William Senhouse	William Sever or William Seveyer; Abbot of St Mary's Abbey, York; translated to Durham.
1503	1508	Roger Leyburn	Richard Leyburn; Archdeacon of Durham.
1508	1520	John Penny	Translated from Bangor.
1521	1537	John Kite	Translated from Armagh; titular Archbishop of Thebes 1521–37.
1537	1556	Robert Aldrich	Provost of Eton and Canon of Windsor.
1557	1559	Owen Oglethorpe	Dean of Windsor; crowned Elizabeth I 15 January; deprived 26 June; died 31 December 1559.
1560		Bernard Gilpin BD	Declined the bishopric on the death of Oglethorpe.
1560	1570	John Best	Prebendary of Wells.
1570	1577	Richard Barnes	Previously suffragan Bishop of Nottingham 1567–70; later translated to Durham.
1577	1598	John May	Prebendary of Ely.
1598	1616	Henry Robinson	Provost of The Queen's College, Oxford.
1616	1621	Robert Snoden	Robert Snowden or Snowdon; Prebendary of Southwell.
1621	1624	Richard Milbourne	Translated to St David's.
1624	1626	Richard Senhouse	Dean of Gloucester.
1626	1629	Francis White	Dean of Carlisle; translated to Norwich.
1629	1642	Barnaby Potter	Provost of Queen's College, Oxford.
1642	1646	James Ussher	in commendam only; Archbishop of Armagh; deprived of the see when the English episcopy was abolished by Parliament on 9 October 1646; died 1656.
1646	1660	The see was abolished during the Commonwealth and the Protectorate.	
1656	1660	See vacant	Episcopacy abolished during the English Interregnum.
1660	1664	Richard Sterne	Master of Jesus College, Cambridge; translated to York.
1664	1684	Edward Rainbowe	Edward Rainbow; Master of Magdalene College, Cambridge.
1684	1702	Thomas Smith	Dean of Carlisle.
1702	1718	William Nicolson	Archdeacon and Prebendary of Carlisle; translated to Derry.
1718	1723	Samuel Bradford	Prebendary of Westminster; translated to Rochester.
1723	1734	John Waugh	Dean of Gloucester.
1734	1747	Sir George Fleming, Bt.	Dean of Carlisle.
1747	1762	Richard Osbaldeston	Dean of York; translated to London.
1762	1768	Charles Lyttelton	Dean of Exeter.
1769	1787	Edmund Law	Archdeacon of Carlisle.
1787	1791	John Douglas	Canon-resident of St Paul's; translated to Salisbury.
1791	1808	The Hon Edward Venables-Vernon	Later Venables-Vernon-Harcourt; translated to York.
1808	1827	Samuel Goodenough	Died in office.
1827	1856	The Hon Hugh Percy	Translated from Rochester; died in office.
1856	1860	The Hon Henry Montagu Villiers	Canon of St Paul's; translated to Durham.
1860	1869	The Hon Samuel Waldegrave	Canon of Salisbury; died in office.
1869	1891	Harvey Goodwin	Dean of Ely.
1892	1904	John Bardsley	Translated from Sodor and Man.
1905	1920	John Diggle	
1920	1946	Henry Williams	Resigned 1946; died 1961.
1946	1966	Thomas Bloomer	Resigned 1966; died 1984.
1966	1972	Cyril Bulley	Previously suffragan Bishop of Penrith; resigned 1972; died 1989.
1972	1989	David Halsey	Previously suffragan Bishop of Tonbridge; died 2009.
1989	1999	Ian Harland	Previously suffragan Bishop of Lancaster; died 2008.
2000	2009	Graham Dow	Previously suffragan Bishop of Willesden.
2009	2023	James Newcome	Previously suffragan Bishop of Penrith.
2025	present	Rob Saner-Haigh	Acting diocesan bishop during vacancy in See; translated from Bishop of Penrith, 1 September 2025.

== Assistant bishops ==
Among those who served as assistant bishops of the diocese were:

- 1931–1938: Logie Danson, Canon Residentiary of Carlisle Cathedral and former Bishop of Labuan and Sarawak; later Bishop of Edinburgh

Honorary assistant bishops — retired bishops taking on occasional duties voluntarily — have included:

- 1997–2021: Alec Graham, retired Bishop of Newcastle
