= Henry Williams (bishop) =

Anglican bishop (1872–1961)

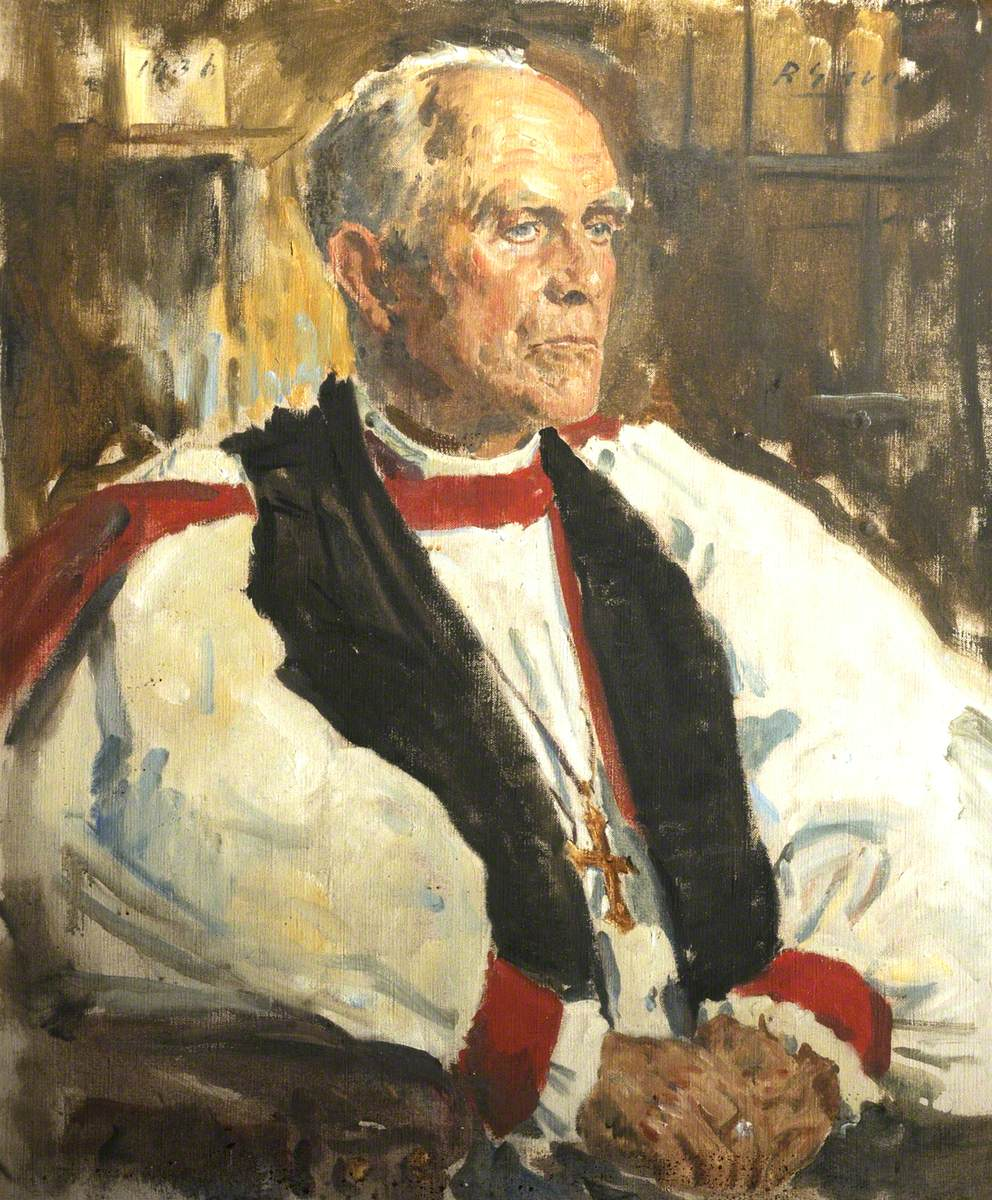
Bishop H.H. Williams by Reginald Grenville Eves

Henry Herbert Williams CH (19 December 1872 – 29 September 1961) was an English clergyman who served as Bishop of Carlisle.

Williams was the elder son of Rev. John Williams, Vicar of Poppleton. He was educated at St Peter's School, York and The Queen's College, Oxford. He began his ministry in 1900 as a tutor and lecturer in philosophy at Hertford College, Oxford and in 1913 he became Principal of St Edmund Hall, Oxford. From 1920 to 1941 he was Bishop of Carlisle. He died on 29 September 1961.

He is credited with the quote "furious activity is no substitute for understanding".

Church of England titles
Preceded by John Diggle	Bishop of Carlisle; 1920 – 1946	Succeeded by Thomas Bloomer
