= William Senhouse =

15th and 16th-century Bishop of Carlisle and Bishop of Durham

- Bishop of Durham
- Appointed: 27 June 1502
- Term ended: 1505
- Predecessor: Richard Foxe
- Successor: Christopher Bainbridge
- Previous post: Bishop of Carlisle

Orders
- Consecration: 1496

Personal details
- Died: 1505
- Denomination: Roman Catholic

William Senhouse (died 1505), also called William Sever, was an English priest, successively Bishop of Carlisle, 1495–1502, and Bishop of Durham, 1502–1505.

Senhouse was educated at the University of Oxford and became a Benedictine monk at St Mary's Abbey, York, being elected abbot in 1485. He was selected as bishop of Carlisle on 4 September 1495, and consecrated in 1496. He was translated to Durham on 27 June 1502.

Senhouse died in 1505.

== Citations ==
Catholic Church titles
Preceded by Richard Bell	Bishop of Carlisle; 1495–1502	Succeeded by Roger Leyburn
Preceded by Richard Foxe	Bishop of Durham; 1502–1505	Succeeded by Christopher Bainbridge
