= Walter Froucester =

Walter Froucester (died 1412), was abbot of St. Peter's, Gloucester.

Froucester had previously officiated as chamberlain of the monastery. On the death of John Boyfield in January 1382, Froucester was elected his successor, being the twentieth abbot. Boyfield's rule had not been successful; he was weak and was in continual trouble with rival ecclesiastics, who, to the disadvantage of his monastery, generally got the better of him. Froucester, on assuming the direction, applied himself to the improvement of the brotherhood's position with marked success, taking and keeping the upper hand over all rivals, and yet without giving offence. By the prudence and economy of his domestic administration he succeeded in wiping off the greater part of the vast debt with which he found the monastery encumbered. From his private purse he supplied the church with ornaments of all kinds, books, vestments, and silver plate.

He is best known for having brought to completion at great expense the beautiful cloisters, the building of which had been begun in Horton's (abbot 1351–77) time, and left unfinished for several years. With the view of securing for his monastery full title to some of its possessions he despatched to Rome one of the brotherhood, William Bryt by name, who, after a stay of some years, succeeded in getting appropriated to the monastery the churches of Holy Trinity and St. Mary de Lode, Gloucester, and that of Chipping Norton, Oxfordshire. Froucester also obtained from Pope Urban, through the influence of the Duke of Gloucester, the privileges of wearing the pontifical mitre, ring, sandals, and dalmatic, which his predecessor had requested in vain. The occasion chosen by Froucester for his investment with these ornaments was 10 April 1390, the day on which the remains of St. Kyneburgh the Virgin were translated to St. Peter's, the ceremony being celebrated by the Bishop of Worcester and Froucester, and a number of ecclesiastics, in the presence of the Duke of Gloucester and many noblemen and ladies. He also obtained from the pope a dispensation allowing the brotherhood of St. Peter's to eat flesh from Septuagesima to Quinquagesima inclusive. By Froucester's orders the registers of the monastery were compiled afresh, and the history of St. Peter's was probably re-edited at the same time. It has sometimes been supposed, but unwarrantably, that this history, early copies of which exist in Queen's College Library, Oxford, and among the Cottonian MSS., was written by Froucester, because the chronicle closes during his abbacy; internal evidence shows that it was compiled from time to time. Froucester died in 1412, and was buried beneath an arch in the southwest portion of the choir of St. Peter's. Sir Robert Atkyns calls him Trowcester.
