= Donald Campbell (disambiguation) =

Donald Campbell (1921–1967) was a British car and motorboat racer.

Donald Campbell may also refer to:

== Religious figures ==
- Donald Campbell (abbot) (died 1562), Scottish noble and churchman
- Donald Campbell (bishop) (1894–1963), Roman Catholic archbishop of Glasgow
- Donald J. Campbell (1903–1973), Canadian-born American prelate of the Episcopal Church

== Sportspeople ==
- Donald Campbell (Australian cricketer) (1851–1887), Australian cricketer
- Donald Campbell (Zimbabwean cricketer) (born 1974), Zimbabwean cricketer
- Donald Campbell (rugby union) (1919–1944), Chilean rugby union player
- Donald Campbell (sprinter) (1926–2017), American former sprinter
- Don Campbell (American football) (1916–1991), American football player
- Don Campbell (ice hockey) (1925–2012), Canadian ice hockey player
- Don Campbell (dancer) (1951–2020), American dancer who invented locking
- Don Campbell (footballer) (1932–2016), English footballer
- Don Campbell (cyclist) (born 1975), Caymanian former cyclist

== Politicians ==
- Sir Donald Campbell, 1st Baronet, of Dunstaffnage (1800–1850), British politician and lieutenant-governor of Prince Edward Island
- Donald Campbell (Texas politician) (1830–1871), lieutenant governor of Texas and Texas senator
- Donald Campbell (Australian politician) (1866–1945), member of the South Australian House of Assembly
- Donald A. Campbell (1922–1992), New York politician
- Donald James Campbell (1932–1984), politician in British Columbia, Canada
- Donald Wilfred Campbell, Canadian ambassador to Japan, 1993–1997

== Military figures ==
- Donald M. Campbell Jr. (born 1955), American army general
- Donald Campbell (British Army officer, died 1763), British officer killed in Pontiac's Rebellion
- Donald Campbell (British Army officer, born 1764) (1764–1806), British officer who fought the American Revolutionary War and became an admiral in the Portuguese Navy
- Donald Campbell (Royal Navy officer) (1788–1856), British admiral

== Others ==
- Donald Campbell (engineer), British railway engineer
- Donald Campbell (traveller) (1751–1804), Scottish traveller in India and the Middle East
- Donald B. Campbell, Australian-born astronomer
- Donald K. Campbell, president of Dallas Theological Seminary, 1986–1994
- Donald L. Campbell (1904–2002), American chemical engineer
- Donald T. Campbell (1916–1996), American social scientist, noted for his work in methodology
- Sir Donald Campbell, 1st Baronet, of Ardnamurchan and Airds (died 1651), Scottish nobleman
- Don Campbell (musician), British reggae singer
- Don "Magic" Juan (born 1949), American 'spiritual advisor' to Snoop Dogg
- Donald Campbell (priest) (1886–1930), British Anglican priest
- Donald Campbell (anaesthetist) (1930–2004), dean of the Royal College of Anaesthetists
