= Joseph Fisher =

Joseph or Joe Fisher may refer to:

- Joe Fisher (ice hockey) (1916–2002), Canadian professional ice hockey player
- Joe Fisher (journalist) (1947–2001)
- Joseph Fisher (priest) (1655–1705), Archdeacon of Carlisle
- Joseph Fisher (Australian politician) (1834–1907), South Australian politician and businessman
- Joseph Fisher, historian who coined the phrase social Darwinism
- Josh Fisher (Joseph A. Fisher), American and Spanish computer scientist
- Joseph R. Fisher (author) (1855–1939), Northern Irish unionist newspaper editor and author
- Joseph R. Fisher (USMC) (1921–1981), Navy Cross recipient
- Joseph Fisher (Northern Ireland politician) (1901/02–1963), Northern Irish unionist
- Joseph Fisher (soldier) (1843–1903), Medal of Honor recipient
- Joseph Jefferson Fisher (1910–2000), U.S. federal judge
- Joseph L. Fisher (1914–1992), congressman from Virginia
- Joseph W. Fisher (1814–1900), American Civil War officer, politician, and judge
- Joey Fisher, American football offensive tackle

== See also ==
- Joseph Fischer (disambiguation)
- Ira Joe Fisher (born 1947), television weather reporter
