= William Jackson (priest, died 1878) =

English Anglican priest and academic

William Jackson (17 December 1792 – 13 September 1878) was an English Anglican priest and academic.

Born in Grasmere, to Rector Thomas Jackson, Jackson was educated at The Queen's College, Oxford, matriculating in 1808 and graduating B.A. in 1812; and was then Fellow and Tutor there until 1828. He was Rector of Lowther from 1828 to 1841; and then of Cliburn from 1841 to 1858. He was also Archdeacon of Carlisle from 1855 until 1858; and Provost of The Queen's College from 1862 until his death in 1878 in Carlisle.

Church of England titles
Preceded by William Goodenough	Archdeacons of Carlisle; 1855 – 1858	Succeeded by William Whitmarsh Phelps
Academic offices
Preceded by William Thomson	Provost of The Queen's College, Oxford; 1862 – 1878	Succeeded by John Richard Magrath
