= Venn (disambiguation) =

Venn is a surname and a given name.

Venn may also refer to:

- Venn, Saskatchewan, Canada, an unincorporated community
- Venn, a 2016 album by British band Clock Opera
- Vennbahn or Venn Railway, a former railway line in Belgium
- VENN, a former American 24/7 streaming television network

== See also ==
- Venn diagram, a diagram that shows all possible logical relations between a finite collection of sets
