= Richard Bradford =

Richard Bradford may refer to:

- Richard Bradford (novelist) (1932–2002), American novelist
- Richard Bradford (actor) (1934–2016), American actor
- Richard Bradford (priest) (1913–1980), Archdeacon of Carlisle, 1970–1978
