= Raïs Hadj Embarek =

Raïs Raïs Hadj Embarek
- Born: 18th century Algiers
- Military career
- Allegiance: State of Algiers
- Branch: Algerian Navy: Taifa of the Raïs
- Service years: 1741–1765 (24 years)
- Rank: Admiral
- Commands: The White Horse Xebec (Al-Hissan al-Abyad); other xebecs of diverse specifications
- Wars: Spanish–Algerian Wars; Barbary–Portuguese conflicts; Algerian–Hamburg conflicts
- Memorials: Algerian National Navy submarine Rais Hadj Mubarek Kilo-class

Hadj Embarek or Raïs Hadj Embarek, was one of the admirals of the Algerian navy in the mid-18th century. He belonged to the Taifa of the Raïs, and was renowned for his extensive reliance on fleets of xebecs, which constituted his dominance in the Mediterranean the Atlantic Ocean. His policy was marked by intense conflict with Spain and Portugal in particular.

== Background ==
Hadj Embarek was of Algerian origin from the capital Algiers and lived during the 18th century. Albert Devoulex dedicated an article to recounting his life, based on the testimony of a 19th-century Algerian sailor known as Raïs Hassan. According to this account. He served in the Algerian Navy between 1741 and 1765, establishing himself as one of the most famous and formidable sailors in the Mediterranean.

== Fleet Composition ==
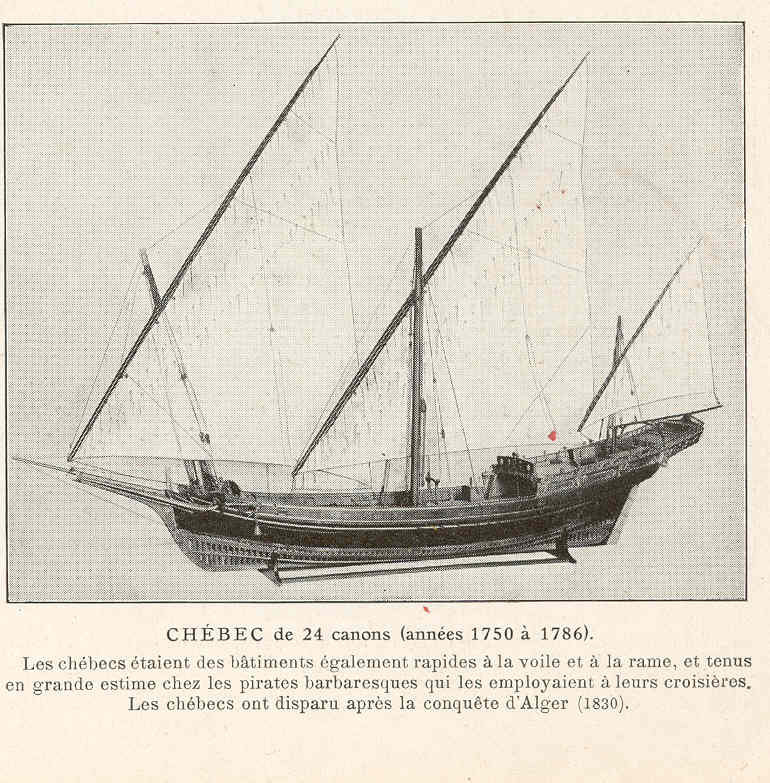
An Algerian Xebec with 24 cannons in 1750, (dating back to the era of Raïs Hadj Embarek).

Hadj Embarek commanded a diverse naval fleet that reflected the versatility of the Algerian Navy in the 18th century. His units included heavy Round Ships equipped with approximately fifty cannons. French consular records reveal a remarkable evolution in his command; in August 1741, he took command of a Xebec vessel, armed with 8 cannons and 54 swivel guns.

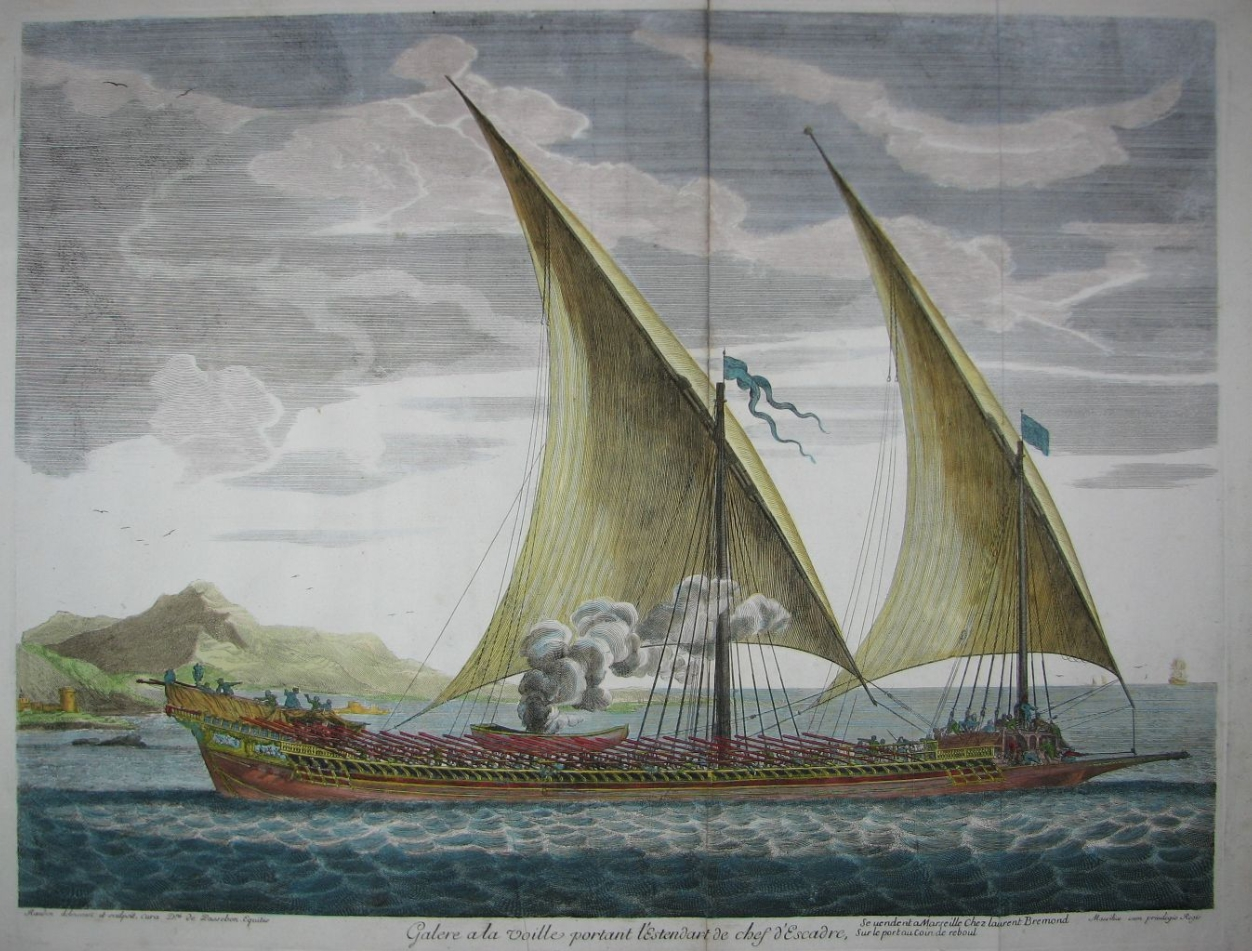
A 17th-century drawing by Henri Sbonski de Passabon depicting a galley under sail. Unlike the xebec, the galley relied primarily on oars.

Hadj Embarek's expertise was not limited to outfitting and equipment but was clearly demonstrated in field confrontations. Documents from the French consul, Charles Philippe Vallière between 1742 and 1765, mention a meeting with a Spanish officer who had been captured by him during the Spanish-Algerian wars. At that time, Hadj Embarek's fleet become included Galleys with his famous Xebec ship, "The White Horse" (Al-Hissan al-Abyad).

His military career of saw a steady rise and diversification in his fleet. In February 1753, he commanded two Xebecs whose hulls were laid on 30 March. Historical records between 1753 and 1763 show him commanding a series of advanced warships, transitioning from one vessel to another that was more capable and heavily armed than the last.

== Status and role in the Algerian state ==
Archival records dated 26 August 1744, and 23 March 1745, indicate that Raïs Hadj Embarek assumed command of a Xebec-class vessel, a naval unit belonging to the Dey of Algiers. This ship was distinguished by advanced military armament, equipped with 24 heavy cannons and 26 swivel cannons.

These official assignments highlight the high level of political and military trust bestowed upon him by the Dey. His role was not limited to routine navigation, he was entrusted with managing and deploying sovereign maritime assets in offensive operations aimed at inflicting maximum military and economic attrition on hostile powers.

== Conflict with European fleets ==
Hadj Embarek was one of the bold and adventurous Raïs who preferred fast warships, specifically the Xebec, over large and heavy naval vessels, primarily engaging in landing wars. His military operations reached as far as the Azores Islands, and his military activity resumed on 29 March 1753, when he took command of a new warship equipped with 26 cannons. According to prize records and local documents, he captured several ships belonging to the Portuguese Empire, the Dutch Republic, and Majorca, as well as Spanish vessels and other ships in the Atlantic Ocean during these conflicts.

On 27 November 1757, he set sail again aboard a Xebec armed with 20 cannons. Algerian documents record that this vessel, under the joint command of Hadj Embarek and Raïs Mohamed El-Maghrebi, captured 24 "infidels" from Hamburg, three of whom were taken as the state's share. Finally, records dated 25 September 1762, and 7 July 1763, indicate that he served as the commander of a state-owned Algerian Xebec equipped with 26 cannons.

== His war against Spain ==
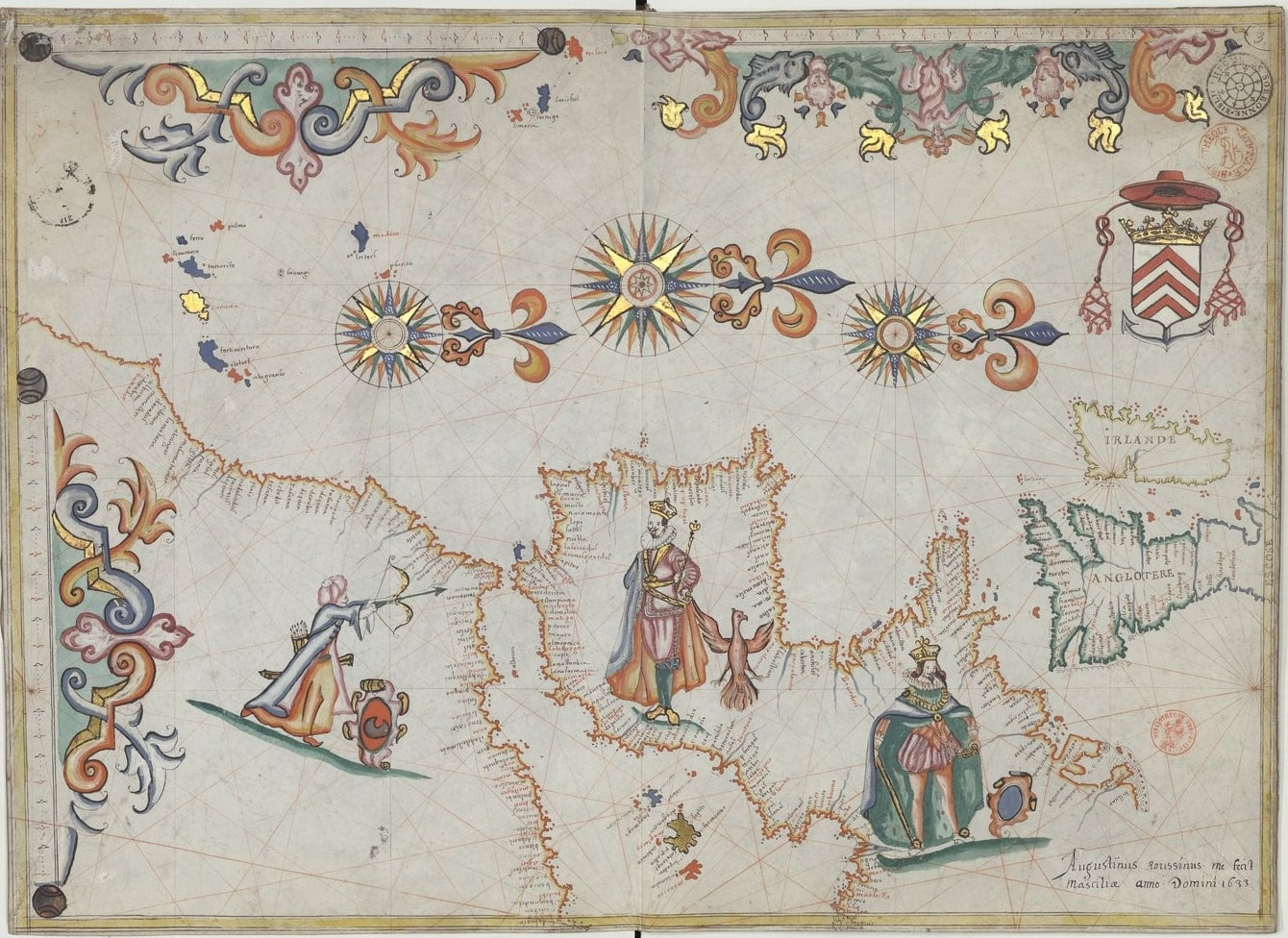
An plate illustrating Algiers, Spain, and France by Augustin Roussin.

The military policies of this Raïs posed a significant threat to Spanish maritime trade through his frequent attacks on its ports and ships, making him the most wanted man in Spain, He was known for his immense boldness, gaining widespread fame and becoming a particular source of terror in Spain. He knew every twist and turn of the country's coasts with precision; he would arrive at dusk, land by night, and pounce upon coastal settlements, plundering them and taking many captives. These actions sowed horror throughout Spain. His name became so common in that land that mothers, to obtain order from their young children, would threaten to call upon Hadj Embarek, who had become like a terrifying monster.

The King of Spain Charles III flew into a rage at this insult; he issued a proclamation to his ministers, commanders, and subjects, announcing a massive reward for anyone who could capture him, dead or alive. In his address according to Albert Devoulex the King stated:

Undoubtedly, this Hadj Embarek is a great man of the sea. You foolish Christians, you cannot be compared to this extraordinary warrior. However, my people have suffered greatly and are weary of him. Therefore, despite my admiration for this hero, we must eliminate him by all ways and means; this famous Raïs must be captured. I promise a bounty of wealth and power to anyone who apprehends him, dead or alive though I would prefer him alive, so that our victory may be complete...

— Charles III,

The Spaniards employed every trick to capture Raïs Hadj Embarek, most notably by disguising a warship as a merchant vessel to lure him in. Once he approached the Spanish coast and fell within range of their cannons, a brief battle led to his capture along with his crew. However, exploiting the Spaniards' excessive drinking, the Raïs launched a swift counterattack and engaged in a second battle, which ended in him capturing the entire Spanish crew and their ship, eventually sailing it back to Algiers.

== See also ==
- Xebec
- Spanish–Algerian War
- Barbary-Portuguese conflicts
- Corsairs of Algiers
- Barbary corsairs
- Algiers
