= William Holgill =

Archdeacon of Carlisle between the years 1532 and 1540

William Holgill was Archdeacon of Carlisle from 1532 until 1540.

Holgill was Rector of Great Salkeld and Prebendary of South Cave in York Minster.
