= Edward Threlkeld =

Archdeacon of Carlisle from 1568 to 1588

Edward Threlkeld (1526–1588) was Archdeacon of Carlisle from 1568 until his death.

Threlkeld was born at Burgh by Sands and educated at Peterhouse, Cambridge. He held livings at Great Salkeld, South Cheriton, Tenbury and Much Marcle.
