= Action of 8 May 1802 =

1802 naval battle between Portugal and the Regency of Algiers

- Part of Barbary–Portuguese conflicts
Date	8 May 1802
Location	Mediterranean Sea
Result	Algerian victory

Belligerents
(Regency of Algiers) Algiers	(Kingdom of Portugal) Portugal

Commanders and leaders
(Regency of Algiers) Raïs Hamidou	(Kingdom of Portugal) Luís Seguin Deshon †

Strength
1 frigate 40–44 guns 150 janissaries 300 crew	1 frigate 36–44 guns 282–300 men

Casualties and losses
36 killed 40 wounded	50 killed 67 wounded Remaining crew captured

The action of 8 May 1802 was a single-ship action which took place in the Mediterranean Sea, when a 36-gun Portuguese frigate, commanded by the French capitão de mar e guerra João Luís de Seguin Deshon, was captured by a 44-gun Algerian frigate, commanded by the privateer Raïs Hamidou.

== Background ==
In the year in which the Treaty of Amiens was concluded, 1802, the Portuguese sent to the Strait of Gibraltar a strong squadron, which in April was constituted by one ship of the line, two frigates and two brigantines.

Due to an outbreak of typhus that was raging on board of the Portuguese ships, only the Cisne remained on patrol in the Strait area, despite also having part of the garrison on board sick or convalescent. On 5 May, the crew spotted an unknown frigate, which was approaching the Portuguese ship during the night. Only at dawn, and already very close range it would be recognized as a privateer frigate of Algiers.

On 8 May, the frigate Nossa Senhora do Bom Despacho, nicknamed the Cisne ("Swan"), of 36 guns and 300 men of garrison, commanded by the capitão de mar e guerra Luís Seguin Deshon, was cruising in the Mediterranean.

== Action ==
Raïs Hamidou, who was commanding a frigate armed with 40–44 guns in the Mediterranean, encountered a Portuguese frigate with 36–44 guns and a crew of 282–300 men.

Employing a ruse de guerre, Hamidou put an English flag he had captured onto his ship, tricking the Portuguese into believing they were facing an English ship, and approached the Cisne from windward, making signals that he wanted to communicate with her. Confident, the Portuguese let her approach without taking any precautions. Suddenly the xebec-frigate, supposedly English but in reality Algerian, approached directly the Portuguese frigate, anchored, and fired one or two artillery volleys, at the same time that its garrison launched itself into boarding, making a terrible tumult. The combat only lasted around an hour and a half.

Caught completely by surprise, the Portuguese could offer little resistance. The commander and some of the crew were killed. The remaining officers, soldiers and sailors were taken prisoner (or enslaved) and taken to Algiers along with the ship, while the cannons and the frigate were incorporated into the Algerian Navy. The frigate's name was changed from Cisne to El Portukiza ("The Portuguese").

== Aftermath ==
Hamidou would go on to capture another frigate near Gibraltar. This angered the Dey, Mustafa, who exiled Hamidou for two years.

In addition to the limitations of the garrison of the Cisne, the fact that the frigate of Algiers was armed with 44 guns, and was the best and largest ship that the Dey had, with its commander being Raïs Hamidou, the most famous and well known Algerian privateer, cannot serve as an excuse for what happened. Despite this event, Portugal kept its ships on patrol in the area, and at the end of September, the frigate Ulisses patrolled the area between Cape Spartel and the Algarve, as there was news that a frigate from Algiers, possibly the same one that had captured the Cisne, was sailing near Cape St. Vincent.

Later, on 6 July 1810, a truce was signed between Portugal and the Dey of Algiers according to which, in exchange for the payment of a large compensation and the delivery of 79 Algerians who were imprisoned in Lisbon, he undertook to release 581 Portuguese and 34 slaves who were captives in Algiers. The liberation was carried out in three groups, and was completed on 23 June 1812.

== See also ==
- Action of 26 May 1789
- Action of 15 August 1799
