= Venn =

Venn is a surname and a given name. It may refer to:

== Given name ==
- Venn Eyre (died 1777), Archdeacon of Carlisle, Cumbria, England
- Venn Pilcher (1879–1961), Anglican bishop, writer, and translator of hymns
- Venn Young (1929–1993), New Zealand politician

== Surname ==
- Albert Venn (1867–1908), American lacrosse player
- Anne Venn (1620s–1654), English religious radical and diarist
- Blair Venn, Australian actor
- Charles Venn (born 1973), British actor
- Harry Venn (1844–1908), Australian politician
- Henry Venn (Church Missionary Society) (1796-1873), English secretary of the Church Missionary Society, grandson of Henry Venn
- Henry Venn (Clapham Sect) (1725–1797), English evangelical minister
- Horace Venn (1892–1953), English cricketer
- John Venn (1834–1923), British logician and the inventor of Venn diagrams, son of Henry Venn the younger
- John Venn (academic) (died 1687), English academic administrator
- John Venn (politician) (1586–1650), English politician
- John Venn (priest) (1759–1813), one of the founders of the Church Missionary Society, son of Henry Venn
- John Archibald Venn (1883–1958), British economist
- Kath Venn (1926–2019), Australian politician
- Kim Venn, Canadian professor of physics and astronomy
- Kristin Venn (born 1994), Norwegian handball player
- Laurie Venn (born 1953), Australian racing cyclist
- Richard Venn (died 1639), English merchant and Lord Mayor of London

== Fictional characters ==
- Diggory Venn, in the 1878 Thomas Hardy novel The Return of the Native
