= Hugh Dacre =

Hugh Dacre may refer to:

- Hugh Dacre (priest) (died 1510), archdeacon of Carlisle
- Hugh Dacre, 4th Baron Dacre (1335–1383), English nobleman
