= George Neville (priest) =

George Neville (29 July 1509; 6 September 1567) was Archdeacon of Carlisle from 1558 until his death.

Threlkeld was born at Well, North Yorkshire the fourth son of Richard Neville, 2nd Baron Latimer. He was educated at the University of Cambridge. He held livings at Burton Latimer, Spofforth, Leake, Rothbury and Great Salkeld.
