= Henry Crewe =

Henry Crewe may refer to:

- Sir Henry Crewe, 7th Baronet (1763–1819)
- Henry Harpur-Crewe, English clergyman and naturalist
- Henry Crewe Boutflower, English Anglican minister and Hulsean essayist
