= Action of 15 August 1799 =

- Part of Barbary–Portuguese conflicts
| Date | 15 August 1799 |
| Location | Mediterranean Sea |
| Result | Algerian victory |

Belligerents
| Regency of Algiers | Kingdom of Portugal |

Commanders and leaders
| (Regency of Algiers) Haji Muhammad Tabah | (Kingdom of Portugal) Inácio P. Pinto (POW) |

Strength
| 1 Gunboat; 350 men | 1 Brigantine; 3 Yachts |

Casualties and losses
| Unknown | 1 brigantine captured 1 Yacht sunk/captured +70 men captured |

The Action of 15 August 1799 was a naval engagement between the Portuguese and the Algerians. The Portuguese brigantine was sailing alongside merchant ships until intercepted by an Algerian ship. The brigantine and a merchant ship were captured by the Algerians.

== Background ==
On 16 February 1799, under the command of Captain James Scarnichia, a flotilla consisting of a ship, a frigate, a corvette, and a brigantine, the Lebre Pequeno, set sail from Lisbon. This force provided convoy for several merchant ships heading to various ports in the Mediterranean Sea. In the month of March, the Portuguese naval force left Lisbon escorting 24 merchant ships of various nationalities, including Portuguese, English, and others. On March 29th, the navy arrived at Mahón, on the island of Menorca, and two weeks later, the frigate and the corvette sailed for Barcelona. Due to legal procedures imposed by the Spanish authorities, the brigantine was allowed to set sail on 15 August, providing convoy for three yachts.

== Action ==
The Lebre Pequeno was armed with only 14 guns of caliber 4 and had a crew of 70 men. On the way to Barcelona, it was attacked by an Algerian gunboat with 34 guns of calibers 12 and 18, with a crew of 350 men, under the command of Rais Hadj Muhammad Tabah. The Lebre Pequeno was commanded by First Lieutenant Inácio Pereira Pinto. The Portuguese accepted battle to save the merchant vessels. Despite the strong resistance from the Portuguese ship, the superiority of the Algerians in all areas, including armament and crew training, ended in favor of the Algerians. The Lebre Pequeno ended up surrendering. The lieutenant was wounded, and all the crews were captured. One of the yachts of the convoy was sunk or captured, and its crew captured as well. The combat took place within sight of the fortress of Barcelona.

== Aftermath ==
The captives of two ships were taken to Algiers, where they arrived on August 23, 1799. Arriving there, Pereira Pinto immediately sent a letter to the Spanish consul in that regency, complaining about the seizure made under the fortresses of Barcelona, with a notorious violation of the Law of Nations, “of the immunity and decorum of a friendly and allied nation, under whose protection he had taken refuge, in good faith and security of this law recognized by the nations.” The issue was brought to the Vekil Khradj—equivalent to the Minister of the Navy—who dismissed the rais and closed the case, while Spain, certainly out of bad conscience, authorized its consul to provide some financial aid to the captives who had been victims of the incident, aid used to provide for their food. In November 1804, Pereira Pinto managed to escape from captivity.

== See also ==
- Action of 27 May 1802
