= Lewis West =

Lewis West was Archdeacon of Carlisle from 1660 until his death in 1667.

West was born in Hunshelf and educated at St John's College, Cambridge. He held incumbencies at Woolley, Great Salkeld and Addingham.
