= Nicholas Deane =

Nicholas Deane was Archdeacon of Carlisle from 1602 until his resignation in 1604.

West was educated at Peterhouse, Cambridge. He held livings at Warcop, Kirkbride, Bromfield and Great Salkeld.
