= Eustace Prescott =

British Anglican priest and author

John Eustace Prescott (2 January 1832 – 17 February 1920) was an Anglican priest and author in the late nineteenth and early twentieth centuries.

Prescott was born in Wakefield, educated at Peterborough Grammar School and Corpus Christi College, Cambridge, and ordained in 1859. After a curacies in Whissendine and Hawkshead he was the incumbent at St Edward King and Martyr, Cambridge and then St Mary's, Carlisle.

He was Archdeacon of Carlisle from 1883 until his death and Chancellor of the Diocese of Carlisle from 1900.

Amongst others he wrote Everyday Scripture Difficulties, 1863 (pt 1), 1866 (pt2); The Threefold Cord, 1868; Statutes of Carlisle Cathedral, 1879; Christian hymns and hymn writers, 1883; The Clergy and Literature, 1891; and The growth of Education in England, 1898.

== Notes ==
Church of England titles
Preceded by Samuel Peach Boutflower	Archdeacon of Carlisle; 1883–1920	Succeeded by Herbert Ernest Campbell
