= Portuguese expedition to Tripoli =

- Part of the War of the Second Coalition and Barbary–Portuguese conflicts
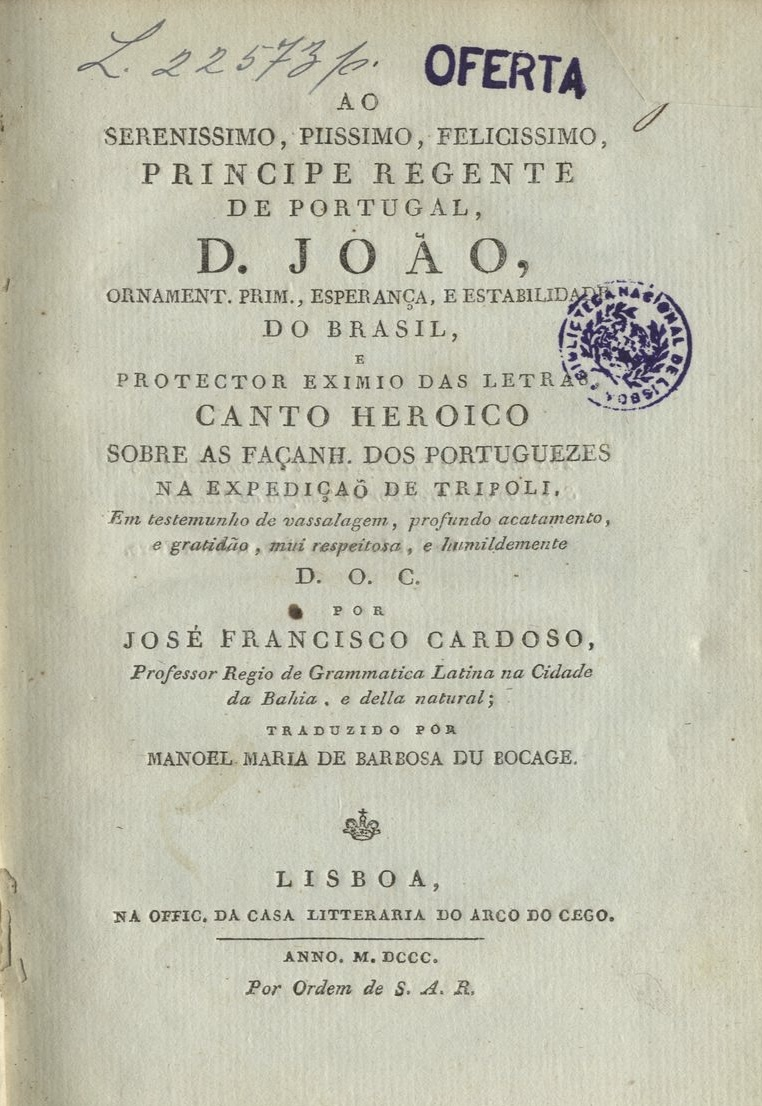
- Canto heroico sobre as façanh. dos portuguezes na expediçaõ de Tripoli, by José Francisco Cardoso, 1800
| Date | 11 May 1799 |
| Location | Tripoli, Ottoman Tripolitania 32°54′15″N 13°12′11″E |
| Result | Portuguese victory |

Belligerents
| Portugal | Tripolitania |

Commanders and leaders
| Donald Campbell; José Maria de Almeida | Yusuf Karamanli |

Strength
| 1 ship (Afonso de Albuquerque; 64 guns); 1 launch and 3 armed cutters | 1 polacca (18 guns) |

Casualties and losses
| 1 wounded | 1 vessel captured and burned 25 killed and many wounded |

The Portuguese expedition to Tripoli was a naval operation carried out by the Portuguese Navy against Ottoman Tripolitania during the French Revolutionary Wars. Conducted by the ship of the line Afonso de Albuquerque under Donald Campbell, the expedition aimed to compel the Tripolitan Bey to sever relations with France and to submit to Portuguese demands. Following a naval attack on the port of Tripoli, the Bey complied with Campbell's demands, delivering the French residents and later signing a truce with Portugal known as the Peace of Tripoli.

The American government later described these operations as "encouraging" and "a happy demonstration of a mode of treatment of the Barbary Powers which all the maritime Christian nations might successfully adopt."

In 1800, the expedition was commemorated in the poem "Canto heróico sobre as façanh. dos portuguezes na expedição de Tripoli", by José Francisco Cardoso.
