= Kevin Roberts (priest) =

Personal life
- Born: Kevin Thomas Roberts; 11 October 1955 (age 70) Saltburn-by-the-Sea
- Education: Queens' College, Cambridge

Religious life
- Religion: Christianity
- Denomination: Anglican

Senior posting
- Post: Archdeacon of Carlisle (2006–2016); Acting Archdeacon of Wells (2016–2017)

Kevin Thomas Roberts was the Archdeacon of Carlisle from 2009 until 2016. He was the acting Archdeacon of Wells from 2016 until 2017, and was the Director of ReSource, a British Christian charity supporting local churches in renewal, from 2016 until his retirement in 2021..

Born in Saltburn-by-the-Sea on 11 October 1955, he was educated at Queens' College, Cambridge and ordained in 1984. Following curacies at Beverley Minster and St John the Evangelist Church, Woodley, he was Vicar of Holy Trinity, Meole Brace from 1991 to 2009.

He is a trustee of Simeon's Trustees, a trust established in the nineteenth century by Charles Simeon to purchase advowsons for Anglican ministers aligned with the Evangelical Anglicanism.

Church of England titles
Preceded by David Thomson	Archdeacon of Carlisle; 2009–2016	Succeeded by Lee Townend
