= Walter Ewbank =

British Anglican priest

Walter Frederick Ewbank (29 January 1918 – 23 March 2014) was an Anglican priest and author.

The son of Sir Robert Benson Ewbank, CSI, CIE, Ewbank was born in Poona in 1918 and educated at Shrewsbury and Balliol and was ordained in 1947. After a curacy at St Martin's, Windermere he served incumbencies in Ings Casterton, Raughton Head and Carlisle. He was Archdeacon of Westmorland and Furness from 1971 to 1977; and then of Carlisle until 1984.

He died in Carlisle in March 2014, aged 96.

Church of England titles
Preceded by Thomas Richard Hare	Archdeacon of Westmorland and Furness; 1971–1977	Succeeded by Arthur Henry Attwell
Preceded by Richard Bleaden Bradford	Archdeacon of Carlisle; 1978–1984	Succeeded by Colin Percy Stannard
