= Colin Stannard =

Anglican Archdeacon

Colin Percy Stannard (8 February 1924 – 4 August 2023) was an English Anglican clergyman who was Archdeacon of Carlisle and a residentiary canon at Carlisle Cathedral from 1984 to 1993.

== Biography ==
Stannard was educated at Woodbridge School and Selwyn College, Cambridge; and, after World War II service with the Royal Norfolk Regiment, ordained in 1950. After a curacy at St Edmundsbury Cathedral he served incumbencies in Grimsby, Barrow-in-Furness, Upperby, Gosforth and Natland before his Carlisle appointments. Stannard died on 4 August 2023, at the age of 99.

== Notes ==
Church of England titles
Preceded by Walter Frederick Ewbank	Archdeacon of Carlisle; 1984–1993	Succeeded by David Charles Turnbull
