= Charles Nurse =

Anglican archdeacon (1909–1981)

Charles Euston Nurse (12 June 1909 – 14 October 1981) was Archdeacon of Carlisle and a Residentiary Canon at Carlisle Cathedral from 1958 until 1970 and 1973 respectively.

He was educated at Windermere Grammar School and Gonville and Caius College, Cambridge; and ordained in 1933. After a curacy at Holy Trinity, Carlisle he served incumbencies in Whitehaven, Barrow-in-Furness and Dalton before his Carlisle appointments.

== Notes ==
Church of England titles
Preceded by Alexander Chisholm	Archdeacon of Carlisle; 1958–1970	Succeeded by Richard Bleaden Bradford
