= Samuel Boutflower =

Rev Samuel Peach Boutflower /ˈboʊflaʊər/ (22 June 1815 – 22 December 1882) was an Anglican clergyman who was Archdeacon of Carlisle from 1867 until 1882.

Boutflower was born in Bristol, the son of British Army surgeon Charles Boutflower, FRCS and cousin of Henry Crewe Boutflower. He was educated at St John's College, Cambridge and ordained in 1839. After a curacy in Coniston he was Perpetual curate at Brathay, Rural Dean of Ambleside and Vicar of Appleby.

== Personal life ==
In 1842, he married firstly, Elizabeth Rawson, daughter of Rev. William Rawson. Rawson established a school in a small parish in Seaforth, Merseyside for the children of Liverpool merchants, where he was the first schoolmaster of Prime Minister William Ewart Gladstone. Three other notable school pupils were Arthur Penrhyn Stanley, Richard Assheton Cross, and William Conyngham Plunket.

He and Rawson had five surviving children before her death in 1855:

- Charles William Boutflower (22 November 1843 – January 1844), died in infancy
- William Nolan Boutflower (5 August 1845 – 10 October 1918) of St John's College, Cambridge and the Indian Education Service
- Rev. Charles Boutflower (3 September 1846 – 7 March 1936), vicar of Terling
- Mary Elizabeth Boutflower (1849 – 8 January 1936), married Rev. Canon William Mutrie Shepherd
- Douglas Boutflower (23 April 1850 – 23 April 1850), died in infancy
- Sophia Lucy Boutflower (June 1851 – 23 December 1917), died unmarried
- Rev. Douglas Samuel Boutflower (18 July 1853 – 1940), of Caius College, Cambridge, Rural Dean of Easington.

In 1859, he married again to Margaret Redmayne, daughter of Giles Redmayne of Brathay Hall and sister of George Tunstal Redmayne. They had three surviving children:

- Rt Rev Cecil Henry Boutflower (15 August 1863 – 19 March 1942), Bishop of Dorking, South Tokyo, and Southampton
- Margaret Mabel Boutflower (January 1865 – 3 June 1925), died unmarried
- Catherine Peach Boutflower (19 August 1867 – 14 October 1867)

He died in 1882 in Carlisle.

Church of England titles
Preceded by William Whitmarsh Phelps	Archdeacon of Carlisle; 1867–1882	Succeeded by John Eustace Prescott
