= John de Kirkby =

English scholar (died 1423)

John de Kirkby or de Kirkeby (died 1423) was an English scholar, cleric and Crown official who held high judicial office in Ireland, and ended his career as Archdeacon of Carlisle.

He is first heard of at the University of Oxford, where he is said to have been Master of a College. He was in holy orders and is said to have held numerous benefices, though no list of them survives. He entered the Royal service and became a clerk in the English Court of Chancery. He first went to Ireland in about 1395. He was in the entourage of Thomas le Despencer, 1st Earl of Gloucester, in 1397: Gloucester was charged with the task of securing the submission of the Irish chieftains, a task in which he had little success. Kirkby was appointed Master of the Rolls in Ireland (his Patent of appointment is dated 1395) and acted as Deputy to the Lord Chancellor of Ireland.

After the downfall of King Richard II in 1399, Kirkby transferred his allegiance to the new King Henry IV; he returned to England in 1400. He accompanied the King on his expedition to Scotland later in the same year, before returning to Ireland for a time in 1404.

He was appointed Archdeacon of Carlisle in about 1415 and held the office until his death in early January 1423.

== Sources ==
- Ball, F. Elrington The Judges in Ireland 1221-1921 John Murray London 1926
- Otway-Ruthven, A.J History of Medieval Ireland Barnes and Noble reprint New York 1993
- Patent Roll 18 Richard II
