= David Turnbull (priest) =

David Charles Turnbull (16 March 1944 – 5 May 2001) was Archdeacon of Carlisle from 1993 until his death.

He was educated at Leeds University and ordained in 1970. After a curacy in Jarrow he served incumbencies at Carlinghow, Penistone, and Barnsley before his Carlisle appointment.

== Notes ==
Church of England titles
Preceded by Colin Percy Stannard	Archdeacon of Carlisle; 1993–2001	Succeeded by David Thomson
