= John Irvin Gregg =

United States Army officer (1826–1892)

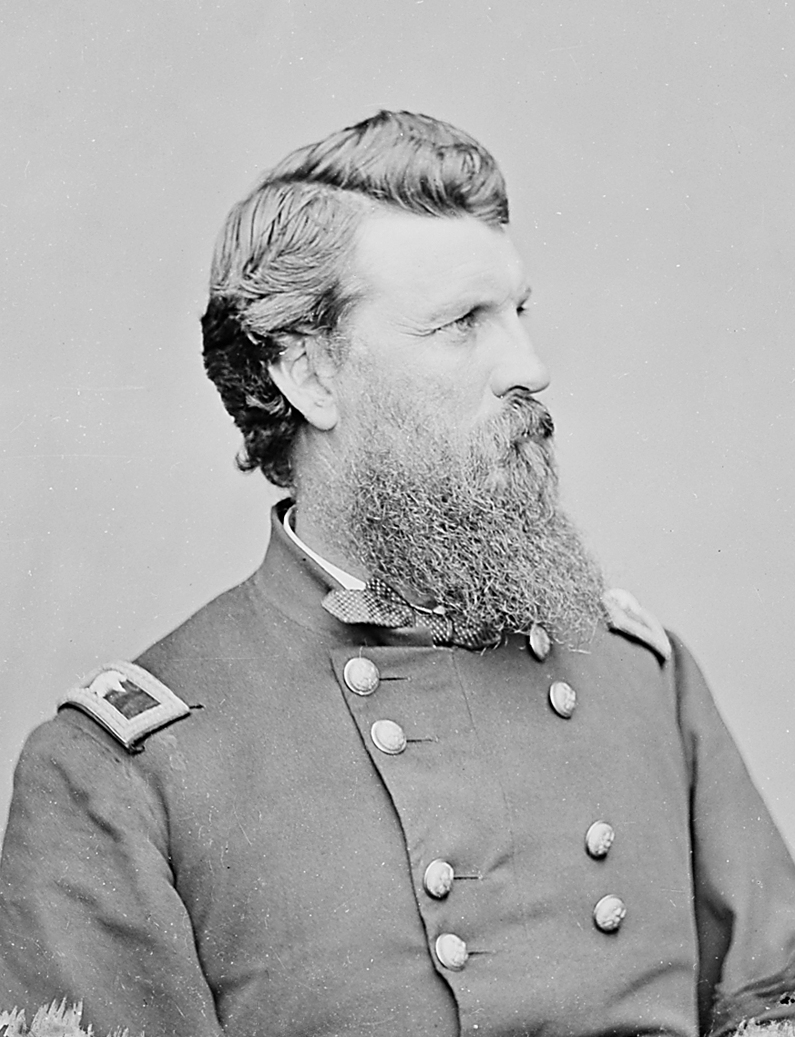
- Brig. Gen. John I. Gregg
- Born: July 19, 1826; Bellefonte, Pennsylvania
- Died: January 6, 1892 (aged 65); Washington, D.C.
- Burial place: Arlington National Cemetery
- Military career
- Allegiance: United States of America; Union
- Branch: United States Army; Union Army
- Service years: 1846–1848, 1861–1879
- Rank: Colonel; Brevet Major General
- Nickname: Long John
- Commands: 16th Pennsylvania Cavalry; Cavalry Corps, Army of the Potomac; 8th U.S. Cavalry Regiment
- Conflicts: Mexican–American War; American Civil War; American Indian Wars

John Irvin Gregg (July 19, 1826 – January 6, 1892) was a career U.S. Army officer. He fought in the Mexican–American War and during the American Civil War as a colonel and near the end of the war as a brevet general in the Union army. In 1866, he was nominated and confirmed as a brevet major general of volunteers and a brevet brigadier general in the Regular Army (United States), both to rank from March 13, 1865.

== Early life and career ==
John Irvin Gregg was born in Bellefonte, Pennsylvania, the grandson of Andrew Gregg (a U.S. Senator from Pennsylvania) and a cousin of future Union general David McMurtrie Gregg. He was also related to Pennsylvania governor Andrew Gregg Curtin. Gregg served in Company E, the "Centre Guards," of the 5th Pennsylvania Reserve Regiment as a lieutenant.

During the Mexican–American War, he enlisted as a private in the 2nd Pennsylvania Infantry on December 29, 1846, and was mustered out of the volunteer service on May 6, 1847. He then received promotions to first lieutenant as of February 18, and to captain as of September 5, both in the 11th U.S. Infantry, serving as a recruiting officer. He was honorably discharged on August 14, 1848.

He then entered the iron industry with the firm Irvin, Gregg & Co., owned by family members. He married Harriet Marr, the daughter of a local Presbyterian minister and schoolteacher. They had two sons, Irvin and Robert.

== Civil War service ==
When the Civil War broke out, Gregg was commissioned a captain in the 3rd U.S. Cavalry on May 14, 1861. He then joined the volunteer army in June as a captain in the 5th Pennsylvania Reserve Regiment. He was elected colonel of the regiment on June 20, 1861, and resigned the following day to accept a commission in the regular army as a captain in the 6th U.S. Cavalry. On November 14, 1862, Gregg was promoted to colonel of the 16th Pennsylvania Cavalry. He then commanded many different cavalry brigades in the various reorganizations of the Army of the Potomac. He led the Third Brigade at the battles of Chancellorsville and Gettysburg in a division commanded by his cousin David Gregg.

In October 1863, he earned another brevet to lieutenant colonel in the regular army for his actions during the Bristoe Campaign.

He was wounded at the Second Battle of Deep Bottom and won a brevet again on October 7, 1864, to full colonel in the regular army. On December 12, 1864, President Abraham Lincoln nominated Gregg for appointment to the grade of brevet brigadier general of volunteers to rank from August 1, 1864, for gallant and meritorious service in the engagement and defenses of Richmond on the Brock Turnpike and at the Battle of Trevilian Station and the United States Senate confirmed the appointment on February 20, 1865.

Gregg briefly was in command of the Cavalry Corps, Army of the Potomac from February 10, 1865, to February 24, 1865. On April 7, 1865, Gregg was slightly wounded at the Battle of Sayler's Creek, captured the next day north of Farmville, Virginia, and was released two days later. Gregg was mustered out of the volunteer service on August 11, 1865.

On June 17, 1865, Colonel John S. Mosby surrendered to Gregg in Lynchburg, Virginia.

On January 13, 1866, President Andrew Johnson nominated Gregg for appointment to the grade of brevet major general of volunteers to rank from March 13, 1865, and the U.S. Senate confirmed the appointment on March 12, 1866. On July 17, 1866, President Johnson nominated Gregg for appointment to the grade of brevet brigadier general in the regular army to rank from March 13, 1865, and the U.S. Senate confirmed the nomination on July 23, 1866.

== Postbellum ==
After the end of hostilities Gregg remained in the Army. He was named colonel of the 8th U.S. Cavalry on July 28, 1866, a position his cousin David McMurtrie Gregg had desired. He then reported for duty at Camp Whipple in the Arizona Territory. He led a series of expeditions against Indians into the Mojave Desert. He was sent to the New Mexico Territory, where he commanded Fort Union from 1870 to 1873, and led efforts in that region to pursue and subdue the Apache. In 1872, he led a reconnaissance expedition to survey and map the Texas Panhandle.

Gregg retired from active service on April 2, 1879. He died in Washington, D.C., on January 26, 1892, and is buried in Arlington National Cemetery in Virginia.

== See also ==
- List of American Civil War brevet generals (Union)
