= Lee Townend =

British Anglican priest (born 1965)

Lee Stuart Townend (born 13 January 1965) is a British Anglican priest who served as Archdeacon of Carlisle, 2017–2022.

Townend was educated at St John's College Durham and ordained in 1999. Following a curacy in Buxton he was Vicar of Loose from 2001 to 2008. He was Priest in charge of All Saints, Ilkley from 2008 to 2012; and then Church Growth Officer for the Chesterfield Archdeaconry until his appointment as Archdeacon.

On 31 August 2022, Townend's intention to resign the Archdeaconry was announced; his resignation was effective 31 December 2022.

Church of England titles
Preceded by Kevin Roberts	Archdeacon of Carlisle; 2017–2022	TBA
