= Joseph Fisher (priest) =

English churchman

Joseph Fisher (c. 1655–1705) was an English churchman, Archdeacon of Carlisle from 1702.

== Life ==
Fisher was born at Whitbridge, Cumberland and matriculated at Queen's College, Oxford in Michaelmas term 1674; took his B.A. degree 8 May 1679, his M.A. 6 July 1682, was fellow of that college, and on the death of Christopher Harrison, 1695, was presented to the rectory of Brough or Burgh-under-Stanmore, Westmoreland. Before that time he had filled the office of lecturer or curate, living in a merchant's house in Broad Street, London, to be near his work. At this place he wrote, 1695, the dedicatory epistle to his former pupil Thomas Lambard, prefacing his printed sermon, preached 27 January 1694 at Sevenoaks, Kent, on 'The Honour of Marriage,' from Heb. xiii. 4.

On the promotion of William Nicolson to the see of Carlisle, the archdeaconry was accepted by Fisher 9 July 1702, and his installation took place 14 July. To the archdeaconry was attached the living of St. Cuthbert, Great Salkeld, which he held in conjunction with Brough till his death, which took place early in 1705. He was succeeded in office by George Fleming, later Sir George Fleming, bishop of Carlisle, 28 March 1705. He was buried at Brough.
