= Archdeacon of Carlisle =

Anglican ecclesiastical office

The Archdeacon of Carlisle is a senior ecclesiastical officer within the Diocese of Carlisle. The archdeacon is responsible for some pastoral care and discipline of the clergy in the ancient archdeaconry of Carlisle. Sources would seem to indicate that the archdeaconry was created at the same time as the diocese; it was first split seven centuries later on 31 August 1847 with the creation of the Westmorland archdeaconry.

== List of archdeacons ==
=== High Medieval ===
- bef. 1133–bef. 1151: Elias
- bef. 1151–aft. 1166: Robert
- bef. 1190–aft. 1194: Peter de Ros
- c. 1195–aft. 1208: Aimeric (also Archdeacon of Durham)
- 18 November 1203: Alexander de Lucy (ineffective royal grant)
- aft. 1208–aft. 1223: G. de Lascy
- aft. 1223–aft. 1234: Gervase de Louther
- bef. 1238–aft. 1238: Robert de Otrington
- bef. 1244–aft. 1255: Walter de Ulceby
- bef. 1263–bef. 1267: Michael de Hamsted
- bef. 1267–aft. 1267: N.
- bef. c. 1275–aft. c. 1275: H.
- bef. c. 1276–aft. c. 1276: Nicholas de Lewelin
- bef. 1285–aft. 1299: Richard de Lyth/de Whitby

=== Late Medieval ===
- 21 November 1302–bef. 1311 (d.): Peter de Insula/Lisle
- 26 November 1311 – 12 March 1318 (res.): Gilbert de Halton
- 27 June 1318–bef. 1320: Thomas de Caldebeck
- 27 December 1320–bef. 1322: Henry de Carlisle
- bef. 1322–aft. 1340: William de Kendal
- aft. 1340–bef. 1350 (d.): William de Briseban
- bef. 1350–aft. 1350: John Marescal
- 1350–bef. 1355: William de Savinhaco
- bef. 1355–May 1364 (d.): William Rothbury
- 18 May 1364 – 19 October 1379 (res.): John de Appleby
- bef. 1379–bef. 1391: Thomas Felton
- bef. 1391–bef. 1405: Thomas de Karlel
- bef. 1405–bef. 1410: Thomas Strickland
- 13 December 1410–bef. 1415: John Burdett
- bef. 1415–bef. 1423 (d.): John de Kirkby
- bef. 1428–bef. 1437: Alexander Cok
- bef. 1437–bef. 1448: Richard Hervey
- bef. 1448–30 January 1450 (res.): Nicholas Close
- bef. 1452–1470 (d.): Stephen Close
- bef. 1463–1465 (res.): George Neville
- bef. 1490–1509 (d.): Hugh Dacre
- bef. 1510–bef. 1520: Cuthbert Conyers
- bef. 1520–aft. 1530: William Bourbank
- bef. 1534–aft. 1547: William Holgill

=== Early modern ===
- bef. 1558–1567 (d.): George Neville
- 11 March 1568 – 1588 (d.): Edward Threlkeld
- 8 October 1588 – 3 June 1597 (res.): Henry Dethick
- 8 June 1597 – 10 November 1599 (res.): Richard Pilkington
- 6 February 1600 – 17 June 1602 (res.): Giles Robinson
- 18 June 1602–bef. 1604 (res.): Nicholas Deane
- 3 February 1604–bef. 1621 (d.): George Warwick
- c. June 1621–bef. 1623 (d.): Robert Wright
- 15 January 1623–bef. 1643 (d.): Isaac Singleton
- ?–bef. 1660 (res.): Peter Wentworth
- 14 November 1660–bef. 1667 (d.): Lewis West
- 28 November 1667 – 13 March 1669 (res.): John Peachell
- 23 March 1669 – 29 September 1682 (res.): Thomas Musgrave
- 3 October 1682 – 1702 (res.): William Nicolson
- July 1702–13 November 1704 (d.): Joseph Fisher
- 28 March 1705 – 1735 (res.): George Fleming (also Dean of Carlisle from 1727)
- March 1735–17 March 1743 (d.): William Fleming
- 21 April 1743 – 19 February 1756 (res.): Edmund Law
- 2 March 1756 – 18 May 1777 (d.): Venn Eyre
- 10 July 1777 – 5 August 1782 (res.): John Law
- 5 August 1782 – 29 January 1805 (res.): William Paley
- 29 January 1805 – 7 June 1827 (d.): Charles Anson
- 20 June 1827 – 18 November 1831 (res.): William Goodenough
- 10 February 1832 – 13 December 1854 (d.): William Goodenough (reinstated)
- 11 June 1855 – 1858: William Jackson

=== Late modern ===
- 1858–1867: William Phelps
- 1867–1882: Samuel Boutflower
- 1883–17 February 1920 (d.): Eustace Prescott
- 1920–17 June 1930 (d.): Ernest Campbell
- 1930–24 September 1933 (d.): Donald Campbell (son of Ernest)
- 1934–1944 (ret.): Grandage Powell, Bishop suffragan of Penrith
- 1944–1946 (res.): Geoffrey Warde
- 1947–October 1958 (ret.): Alexander Chisholm (afterwards archdeacon emeritus)
- 1958–1970 (res.): Charles Nurse (afterwards archdeacon emeritus)
- 1970–1978 (ret.): Richard Bradford (afterwards archdeacon emeritus)
- 1978–1984 (ret.): Walter Ewbank (afterwards archdeacon emeritus)
- 1984–1993 (ret.): Colin Stannard (afterwards archdeacon emeritus)
- 1993–5 May 2001 (d.): David Turnbull
- 2002–2008 (res.): David Thomson
- 2009–31 March 2016 (res.): Kevin Roberts
- 2016–2017: Chris Sims (Acting)
- June – July 2016 (archdeacon-designate): Jonathan Brewster (announced and withdrew)
- 25 February 2017 – 31 December 2022 (res.): Lee Townend
- 2023 – 31 March 2024 (ret.): Richard Pratt (previously Archdeacon of West Cumberland)
- 8 September 2024 – present: Ruth Newton

== Sources ==
- Greenway, Diana E. (1971), Fasti Ecclesiae Anglicanae 1066–1300, vol. 2, pp. 23–25
- Jones, B. (1963), Fasti Ecclesiae Anglicanae 1300–1541, vol. 6, pp. 101–103
- Horn, Joyce M.; Smith, David M.; Mussett, Patrick (2004), Fasti Ecclesiae Anglicanae 1541–1857, vol. 11, pp. 18–20
