= William Bourbank =

16th-century Archdeacon of Carlisle

William Bourbank was Archdeacon of Carlisle from 1523 until his death.

Bourbank was educated at the University of Cambridge. He held livings at Terrington, Barnack and Christian Malford.
