= Robert Wright (priest, died 1622) =

Robert Wright was Archdeacon of Carlisle from his installation on 12 July 1621 until his death on 16 January 1622.
