= Venn Eyre =

Venn Eyre was Archdeacon of Carlisle from 2 March 1756 until his death on 18 May 1777.

Eyre was educated at St Catharine's College, Cambridge. He held livings at Stambourne and Stambridge in Essex and Great Salkeld, Cumberland.

Church of England titles
Preceded by Edmund Law	Archdeacons of Carlisle; 1756– 1777	Succeeded by John Law
