= Listed buildings in Great Salkeld =

Great Salkeld is a civil parish in Westmorland and Furness, Cumbria, England. It contains 23 listed buildings that are recorded in the National Heritage List for England. Of these, two are listed at Grade II*, the middle of the three grades, and the others are at Grade II, the lowest grade. The parish contains the village of Great Salkeld and he surrounding countryside. The listed buildings comprise houses and associated structures, farmhouses and farm buildings, a church and items in the churchyard, a folly, a war memorial, and a telephone kiosk.

== Key ==
Grade	Criteria
II*	Particularly important buildings of more than special interest
II	Buildings of national importance and special interest

== Buildings ==
Name and location	Photograph	Date	Notes	Grade
St Cuthbert's Church; 54.72384°N 2.69756°W		Late 11th century	The fortified tower dates from about 1380, alterations were made to the church in about 1480 and in 1674, and it was restored in 1866 and 1879. The church is built in sandstone, the tower and chancel are on chamfered plinths, and the roof is in sandstone slate with coped gables and a cross finial. The church consists of a nave with a south porch, a chancel, and a west tower. The tower has very thick walls, three stages, loops, a clock face on the south side, and a projecting southeast stair turret; the tower and the turret have battlemented parapets. The south doorway is Norman with three orders of zigzag arches.	II*
Two medieval graveslabs 54.72374°N 2.69766°W	—	13th century (probable)	The graveslabs are in the churchyard of St Cuthbert's Church. They are in sandstone and are carved with floriated crosses, and one also has carvings of a chalice, a book and shears.	II
The Rectory; 54.72240°N 2.69764°W	—	Early 15th century	Originally a fortified tower house, it was altered in 1674, and extended in the 19th century. The house is in sandstone on a chamfered plinth and has green slate roofs. A gabled roof has been added to the tower, which has very thick walls, two storeys, and cross-mullioned windows. To the left is a lower two-storey two-bay hall wing with a single-bay extension, and there are further extensions at the rear. The later parts have quoins, and mullioned and transomed windows, and in the hall range is a doorway with a Tudor arched head.	II*
Beckbank Farmhouse; 54.71483°N 2.70360°W	—	Late 17th century	The farmhouse was extended at right angles in the middle of the 18th century, it is roughcast, and has two storeys. The older part has a roof of sandstone slate with coped gables, two bays, mullioned windows with chamfered surrounds, and a wash house extension. The later part, facing the road, has a green slate roof, four bays, a doorway that has an architrave with a decorative keyed lintel, and a pediment. The windows are sashes in architraves.	II
The Cottage, Nunwick Hall; 54.71706°N 2.69601°W	—	Late 17th century (probable)	A house that was later extended, the original part is in stone, and the later part is rendered with sandstone quoins. The whole has a Welsh slate roof. There are two storeys, a main block of four bays, and a rear extension of one bay that incorporates an early 18th-century square rusticated pier with a ball finial. In the extension is a mullioned window.	II
Town Head Farmhouse; 54.72505°N 2.69852°W	—	Late 17th or early 18th century	The farmhouse is roughcast with a green slate roof. There are two storeys, four bays, and the plank door and mullioned windows have chamfered surrounds.	II
Force Mill House; 54.73536°N 2.68108°W	—	Early 18th century	The house is roughcast with a sandstone slate roof. There are two storeys and two bays, a projecting lean-to wash house at the left, and a two-storey single-bay extension at the rear. In the ground floor is a mullioned window, and in the upper floor are two sash windows; these windows and the doorway have chamfered surrounds. At the rear are a sash window and a casement window, both with sandstone surrounds.	II
Nunwick Old Hall; 54.71687°N 2.69578°W	—	Early 18th century	A roughcast house with quoins and an eaves cornice in sandstone, and a green slate roof. There are two storeys and four bays. The doorway has an alternate block surround, and in the ground floor are former doorways with similar surrounds converted into sash windows. In the upper floor are sash windows with sandstone architraves. There is an extension to the left with a mullioned window. Attached to the house are a rusticated gate pier with a ball finial, and a round-arched doorway with inscribed shields.	II
Gate piers and walls, Nunwick Hall; 54.71698°N 2.69978°W		Early 18th century	The piers and walls are in sandstone. The gate piers flanking the entrance to the drive are square and rusticated, and have moulded caps surmounted by heraldic beasts. From the gate piers, serpentine walls with coved coping lead to square rusticated end piers.	II
Hunter Hall and former stables 54.72367°N 2.69871°W	—	Mid 18th century	The house incorporates part of an earlier house dated 1666. The house is roughcast, and the whole building has two storeys and a roof of sandstone slate. The house has five bays, a door in a stone architrave with a carved frieze and a pediment, and sash windows in sandstone surrounds. The stables to the left are in sandstone and have two bays and sash windows.	II
Walls and gateway, Hunter Hall; 54.72364°N 2.69844°W	—	Mid 18th century	The walls enclose the garden in front of the house. The wall alongside the road is in sandstone with shaped coping, and the side walls are in brick and higher. The gate piers are rusticated and have ball finials.	II
Sundial; 54.72379°N 2.69785°W	—	1754	The sundial is in the churchyard of St Cuthbert's Church. It is in sandstone, and consists of a baluster column on a stepped plinth, and on the top is a brass dial, but no gnomon.	II
Post Office, Post Office Cottage, cart shed and hay barn 54.72177°N 2.69943°W	—	1757	A pair of houses with a farm building attached to the left; the house on the right is dated 1854. They are in sandstone, partly rendered, and have a sandstone slate roof. The building is in two storeys, and each part has two bays, with the left bay of the barn projecting and gabled. The doors and the windows, which are sashes, have plain stone surrounds. In the barn is a segmental-arched opening above which is a ventilation slit. (Note: Street View in March 2010 shows that Post Office was no longer operational as such, and the cart shed and barn have been converted for residential use.)	II
Salkeld House; 54.72460°N 2.69884°W	—	Late 18th or early 19th century	A stuccoed house on a chamfered plinth, with quoins and a green slate roof. There are two storeys, and a symmetrical front of three bays. The central round-headed doorway has a pilastered surround, imposts, a false keystone, and a fanlight with intersecting tracery. The windows are sashes in stone surrounds.	II
Wall and gates, Salkeld House; 54.72463°N 2.69858°W	—	Late 18th or early 19th century	The walls in front of the garden are in sandstone with dressings in calciferous sandstone, and have chamfered copings. There are two gate piers and pier at the left end. All the piers are rusticated and have shaped caps.	II
Coach house, stables and barn, Nunwick Hall; 54.71653°N 2.69540°W	—	1845 (probable)	The combined coach house and stables and the barn are at right angles, forming an L-shaped plan. Both ranges are in sandstone with quoins, in two storeys, and each has five bays. The coach house and stables have a Welsh slate roof, a hip-roofed porch with a round-arched carriage door, and casement windows. The barn has a green slate roof with a weathervane on the gable, and openings with segmental and flat heads.	II
Folly, Inglewood Bank; 54.70480°N 2.72196°W	—	Late 19th century	The folly is in sandstone, it has a rectangular plan, no windows, an entrance with a pointed head, and a battlemented parapet.	II
Inglewood Bank; 54.70165°N 2.72366°W	—	c. 1877	The house is on the site of an earlier house, and was later extended. It is in sandstone with string courses, eaves modillions, and battlemented parapets. The house has an irregular plan, with 2 1/2 storeys. The central part has three bays, flanked by higher two-bay wings. In the centre is a circular battlemented three-storey porch that has a doorway with a panelled frieze and a blank shield, and cross-mullioned windows. The left wing has a bow front with semicircular angle turrets, sash windows and a gabled dormer. The right wing is later, and has a French window and sash windows in stone architraves. At the left end is a conservatory with a lantern on the roof.	II
Stables, Inglewood Bank; 54.70186°N 2.72412°W	—	1877	The stables are in sandstone with a hipped green slate roof. There are two storeys and four bays. The stables contain a round-arched carriage entrance, smaller segmental-arched openings, and sash windows with chamfered surrounds.	II
Nunwick Hall; 54.71612°N 2.69536°W	—	1892	A country house designed by C. J. Ferguson in Tudor style, it was altered in 1899 and extended in the 1930s. The house is in sandstone on a chamfered plinth, and has a green slate roof with coped gables, ball finials, and an open balustraded parapet. There are two storeys, the garden front has three bays and two projecting gabled wings. There are two doors, one with a fanlight, and the windows are mullioned, or mullioned and transomed.	II
Lodge, Nunwick Hall; 54.71461°N 2.69931°W	—	1892	The lodge, at the original entrance to the hall, was designed by C. J. Ferguson. It is in sandstone with a green slate roof. There is one storey, two bays, and a single-bay extension to the rear, giving a T-shaped plan. In the centre is a round-arched doorway with a hood mould, and the windows are mullioned.	II
War memorial 54.72369°N 2.69744°W	—	1919	The war memorial is in the churchyard of St Cuthbert's Church. It is in sandstone, and consists of a Celtic cross with a tapering shaft on a stepped plinth. It is inscribed with the names of those lost in the First World War.	II
Telephone kiosk 54.72292°N 2.69868°W	—	1935	A K6 type telephone kiosk, designed by Giles Gilbert Scott. Constructed in cast iron with a square plan and a dome, it has three unperforated crowns in the top panels.	II

== Notes and references ==
=== Sources ===
- Historic England, "Church of St Cuthbert, Great Salkeld (1100260)", National Heritage List for England
- Historic England, "Two medieval graveslabs south of nave of Church of St Cuthbert, Great Salkeld (1145369)", National Heritage List for England
- Historic England, "The Rectory, Great Salkeld (1100254)", National Heritage List for England
- Historic England, "Beckbank Farmhouse, Great Salkeld (1145334)", National Heritage List for England
- Historic England, "The Cottage, Nunwick Hall, Great Salkeld (1326803)", National Heritage List for England
- Historic England, "Town Head Farmhouse, Great Salkeld (1145367)", National Heritage List for England
- Historic England, "Force Mill House, Great Salkeld (1348499)", National Heritage List for England
- Historic England, "Nunwick Old Hall, Great Salkeld (1145330)", National Heritage List for England
- Historic England, "Gatepiers and walls at entrance to Nunwick Hall, Great Salkeld (1145331)", National Heritage List for England
- Historic England, "Hunter Hall and former stables, Great Salkeld (1100287)", National Heritage List for England
- Historic England, "Walls and gateway in front of Hunter Hall, Great Salkeld (1145368)", National Heritage List for England
- Historic England, "Sundial south-west of Church of St Cuthbert, Great Salkeld (1348545)", National Heritage List for England
- Historic England, "Post Office, Post Office Cottage and attached Cart Shed and Hay Barn, Great Salkeld (1326801)", National Heritage List for England
- Historic England, "Salkeld House, Great Salkeld (1145366)", National Heritage List for England
- Historic England, "Wall and gates in front of Salkeld House, Great Salkeld (1100281)", National Heritage List for England
- Historic England, "Coach house, stables and barn north of Nunwick Hall, Great Salkeld (1145329)", National Heritage List for England
- Historic England, "Folly on hill north-east of Inglewood Bank, Great Salkeld (1326805)", National Heritage List for England
- Historic England, "Inglewood Bank, Great Salkeld (1145332)", National Heritage List for England
- Historic England, "Stables west of Inglewood Bank, Great Salkeld (1145333)", National Heritage List for England
- Historic England, "Nunwick Hall, Great Salkeld (1326802)", National Heritage List for England
- Historic England, "The Lodge, south-west of Nunwick Hall, Great Salkeld (1326804)", National Heritage List for England
- Historic England, "War Memorial south of Church of St Cuthbert, Great Salkeld (1145370)", National Heritage List for England
- Historic England, "K6 Telephone kiosk, Great Salkeld (1145307)", National Heritage List for England
- Historic England, Listed Buildings
- Hyde, Matthew; Pevsner, Nikolaus (2010) [1967], Cumbria, The Buildings of England, New Haven and London: Yale University Press, ISBN 978-0-300-12663-1
