= Alexander Chisholm (priest) =

Alexander Chisholm (21 January 1887 – 17 December 1975) was Archdeacon of Carlisle from 1947 until 1958.

He was educated at Durham University, completing his licentiate in theology in 1911 as a member of Hatfield College. After a curacy at St Luke's, Bath he served incumbencies in Wedmore, Yeovil and Weston-super-Mare. He was Sub-Dean of Wells Cathedral before his Carlisle appointment.

Church of England titles
Preceded by Geoffrey Hodgson Warde	Archdeacon of Carlisle; 1947–1958	Succeeded by Charles Euston Nurse
