= Cuthbert Conyers =

Cuthbert Conyers, DCL was Archdeacon of Carlisle from 1510 until 1520.

Conyers was born in Marske and educated at Cambridge University. He held livings at Marske, Whenby, Hutton Rudby and Wem.
