= Joseph Fischer =

Joseph Fischer may refer to:

- Franz Joseph Emil Fischer (1877–1947), German chemist
- Joseph Anton Fischer (1814–1859), German artist
- Joseph Emanuel Fischer von Erlach (1693–1742), Austrian architect
- Joseph Fischer (cartographer) (1858–1944), German cartographer
- Joschka Fischer (Joseph Martin Fischer, born 1948), German politician
- Joseph Fischer (Kentucky politician) (born 1954), American politician and state legislator in Kentucky
- Josef E. Fischer (1937–2021), American physician and professor
- Josef Fischer (cyclist) (1865–1953), German road racer
- Joseph Fischer (footballer) (1909–1986), Luxembourgian footballer
- Josef Fischer (footballer), Austrian
- Josef Fischer, Sr., Austrian cartwright and founder of the sporting-goods company Fischer
- József Fischer (1887–1952), Romanian–Hungarian Jewish politician
- Joey Fischer (1976–1993), murdered American student, see Murder of Joey Fischer
- Fischer v. United States, Joseph W. Fischer, petitioner in United States Supreme Court case (Docket No. 23-5572)

== See also ==
- Joseph Fisher (disambiguation)
