= William Goodenough (priest) =

William Goodenough (bapt. 24 January 1773 – 13 December 1854) was Archdeacon of Carlisle from 1827 to his death.

Goodenough was born in Broughton, Oxfordshire to Edmund Goodenough and Anna Juliana Taunton and educated at Christ Church, Oxford. He held incumbencies at Warkworth and Great Salkeld.

He died in 1854 in Mareham le Fen.
