= 5th Pennsylvania Reserve Regiment =

Union Army infantry regiment

5th Pennsylvania Reserve Regiment (34th Pennsylvania Volunteer Infantry)
- Active: June 20, 1861 to June 13, 1864
- Country: United States
- Allegiance: Union
- Branch: Infantry
- Engagements: Seven Days Battles; Battle of Mechanicsville; Battle of Gaines's Mill; Battle of Savage's Station; Battle of Glendale; Battle of Malvern Hill; Second Battle of Bull Run; Battle of South Mountain; Battle of Antietam; Battle of Fredericksburg; Battle of Gettysburg; Bristoe Campaign; Mine Run Campaign; Battle of the Wilderness; Battle of Spotsylvania Court House; Battle of North Anna; Battle of Cold Harbor

The 5th Pennsylvania Reserve Regiment, also known as the 34th Pennsylvania Volunteer Infantry, was an infantry regiment that served in the Union Army as part of the Pennsylvania Reserves infantry division during the American Civil War.

== Organization ==
Company	Moniker	Primary Location of Recruitment	Captains
A	The Jersey Shore Rifles	Lycoming County	H.C. Ulman
B	The Taggart Guards	Northumberland County	James Taggart
C	The Washington Cadets	Clearfield County	J.O. Loraine
D	The Slifer Guards	Union County	Thomas Chamberlain
E	The Centre Guards	Centre County	John I. Gregg
F	The Bradford Union Guards	Bradford County	A.J. Trout
G	The Huntingdon Infantry	Huntingdon County	A.S. Harrison
H	The Pollock Guards	Northumberland County	John McCleery
I	The Scott Infantry	Huntingdon County	George Dare
K	The Cookman Rangers	Lancaster County	Joseph W. Fisher

== Service ==
The 5th Pennsylvania Reserves was organized in Harrisburg, Pennsylvania on June 20, 1861 and mustered in under the command of Colonel John Irvin Gregg.

The regiment was attached to 1st Brigade, McCall's Pennsylvania Reserves Division, Army of the Potomac, to March 1862. 1st Brigade, 2nd Division, I Corps, Army of the Potomac, to April 1862. 1st Brigade, McCall's Division, Department of the Rappahannock, to June 1862. 1st Brigade, 3rd Division, V Corps, Army of the Potomac, to August 1862. 1st Brigade, 3rd Division, III Corps, Army of Virginia, to September 1862. 1st Brigade, 3rd Division, I Corps, Army of the Potomac, to November 1862. 3rd Brigade, 3rd Division, I Corps, Army of the Potomac, to February 1863. 3rd Brigade, Pennsylvania Reserves Division, XXII Corps, Department of Washington, to June 26, 1863. 3rd Brigade, 3rd Division, V Corps, Army of the Potomac, to June 1864.

The 5th Pennsylvania Reserves mustered out June 13, 1864.

== Detailed service ==
Ordered to a point on the Pennsylvania state line opposite Cumberland, Md., on June 22; then moved into western Virginia in support of Lew Wallace. Moved to Washington, D.C., on August 8. Duty at Tennallytown, Md., until October 10, 1861, and at Camp Pierpont, near Langley, Va., until March 1862. Expedition to Grinnell's Farm December 6, 1861. Advance on Manassas, Va., March 10–15, 1862. McDowell's advance on Falmouth April 9–19. Duty at Fredericksburg until June. Moved to White House June 11–13. Seven Days before Richmond June 25-July 1. Battles of Mechanicsville June 26, Gaines's Mill June 27, Charles City Cross Roads and Glendale June 30, and Malvern Hill July 1. At Harrison's Landing until August 16. Movement to join Pope August 16–26. Battle of Groveton August 29. Second Battle of Bull Run August 30. Maryland Campaign September 6–24. Battle of South Mountain September 14. Battle of Antietam September 16–17. Duty in Maryland until October 30. Movement to Falmouth, Va., October 30-November 19. Battle of Fredericksburg December 12–15. "Mud March" January 20–24, 1863. Ordered to Washington, D.C., February 6. Duty in the defenses of Washington and Alexandria until June 25. Joined Army of Potomac in the field. Battle of Gettysburg, July 1–3. Pursuit of Lee July 5–24. Bristoe Campaign October 9–22. Advance to line of the Rappahannock November 7–8. Rappahannock Station November 7. Mine Run Campaign November 26-December 2. Duty at Alexandria until May 1864. Rapidan Campaign May, 1864. Battle of the Wilderness May 5–7. Laurel Hill May 8. Spotsylvania May 8–12. Spotsylvania Court House May 12–21. Assault on the Salient May 12. Harris Farm May 19. North Anna River May 23–26. Jericho Ford May 25. Line of the Pamunkey May 26–28. Totopotomoy May 28–31. Left front May 31, 1864.

== Casualties ==
The regiment lost a total of 209 men during service; 14 officers and 127 enlisted men killed or mortally wounded, 68 enlisted men died of disease.

== Commanders ==
- Colonel John Irvin Gregg - resigned June 21, 1861 to accept a commission in the 6th U.S. Cavalry
- Colonel Seneca G. Simmons - killed in action at the Battle of Glendale
- Colonel Joseph W. Fisher
- Lieutenant Colonel George Dare - commanded at the Second Battle of Bull Run and the Battle of Gettysburg

== See also ==
- List of Pennsylvania Civil War Units
- Pennsylvania in the Civil War
