= William Fleming (priest) =

British priest (1710–1742)

William Fleming (1710 – 1742) was Archdeacon of Carlisle from 1735 until his death.

The only son of George Fleming, Bishop of Carlisle from 1734 to 1747, he was matriculated at The Queen's College, Oxford in 1727. He graduated B.A. in 1731, M.A. in 1733, B.C.L. and D.C.L. in 1742. He died on 17 March 1742.

== Notes ==
Church of England titles
Preceded by George Fleming	Archdeacon of Carlisle; 1863–1867	Succeeded by Edmund Law
