= John Richard Magrath =

British academic and administrator

John Richard Magrath (1839–1930) was a British academic and administrator at the University of Oxford.

== Life ==
Third son of Nicholas Magrath, a Royal Navy surgeon, and his wife Sarah Mauger Monk, Magrath was born at Saint Peter Port, Guernsey and educated at Elizabeth College. He attained a Bachelor of Arts degree from Oriel College, Oxford (1st class Literae humaniores, 4th class mathematics) in 1860 (M.A. 1863) and was a fellow of The Queen's College, Oxford, from 1860 to 1878. He was ordained in 1863, serving as vicar of Sparsholt with Kingston Lisle, Berkshire (now Oxfordshire) from 1887 to 1889, and as chaplain to Bishop Thorold of Winchester from 1890 to 1895. At the Queen's College, he became Tutor (from 1864), Dean (1864–67), Chaplain (1867–78), Bursar (1874–78), Pro-provost (1877), and then Provost (1878–1930). In 1878 he was awarded B.D. and D.D.

At Oxford he was a member of the University's Hebdomadal Council (1878–99), Curator of the University Chest (1885–1908), a Delegate of the Oxford University Press (1894–1920), and Vice-Chancellor (1894–98).

Magrath was an Alderman in Oxford from 1889 to 1895, also serving as a magistrate. He was in support of women's higher education and interested in northern schools connected with The Queen's College, especially St Bees School.

Having been reclusive for the last ten years of his provostship, seen only by the servant that brought him his meals, Magrath's refusal to participate in college affairs led the college to seek to get rid of him. He was bought a house at Boars Hill, south-west of Oxford; travelling there on a cold February day in an open carriage, Magrath developed pneumonia and died three days later.

Magrath's papers are in the Bodleian Library at Oxford.

== Works ==
- The Fall of the Republic of Florence, (Stanhope Prize Essay), 1860
- A Plea for the Study of Theology in the University of Oxford, 1868
- Selections from Aristotle’s Organon, 1868, 2nd ed. 1877
- Papers on University Reform, 1877
- 'Queen's College', in Clark's Colleges of Oxford, 1891
- The Flemings in Oxford, vol. I 1904, vol. II 1913, vol. III 1924
- The Obituary Book of Queen's College, Oxford, 1910
- Fresh Light on the Family of Robert de Eglesfield, Kendal, 1916
- Sir Robert Parvyng, Kendal, 1919
- The Queen's College, in two volumes, 1921, republished by BiblioBazaar 2009 (ISBN 978-1117672939) Volume 1 republished by General Books, 2010 (ISBN 978-1152592209)

Academic offices
Preceded by William Jackson	Provost of The Queen's College, Oxford; 1878–1930	Succeeded by E. M. Walker
Preceded by Henry Boyd	Vice-Chancellor of Oxford University; 1894–1898	Succeeded by Sir William Anson, 3rd Baronet
