= Giles Robinson =

English priest

Giles Robinson was an English priest in the late 16th and early 17th centuries.

Robinson was born in Cumberland and educated at The Queen's College, Oxford. He was Principal of St Mary Hall, Oxford from 1532 to 1537. held livings at St Petroc, Trevalga, St Clement Danes, London; St Mary's Church, Berry Pomeroy and St Mary, Churston Ferrers. He held livings at Salkeld and Crosthwaite. The brother of Bishop Henry Robinson, he was Archdeacon of Carlisle from 1600 until 1602.
