= Herbert Campbell (priest) =

English priest (1856–1930)

Ven. Herbert Ernest Campbell (bapt. 15 May 1856 – 17 June 1930) was an Anglican Archdeacon in the late nineteenth and early twentieth centuries.

He was educated at Exeter College, Oxford and ordained in 1879. He was Chaplain to the Bishop of Sodor and Man from 1879 to 1982 after which he held curacies at Christ Church, Brighton and St. Michael's Church, Chester Square. He was Vicar of St George, Millom from 1887 to 1895; Rector of Workington from 1895 to 1905; Archdeacon of Furness and Vicar of St George, Barrow-in-Furness from 1905 to 1911; a Canon Residentiary of Carlisle Cathedral from 1911 to 1930; Archdeacon of Carlisle from 1920 to 1930; and Chancellor of the Diocese of Carlisle from 1920 to 1930.

He died on 17 June 1930. His son Donald was also Archdeacon of Carlisle.
