= Henry Crewe Boutflower =

British clergyman and writer (1796–1863)

Henry Crewe Boutflower /ˈboʊflaʊər/ (25 October 1796 – 4 June 1863) was an English Anglican minister and Hulsean essayist.

Boutflower was the son of John Boutflower, surgeon, of Salford, and cousin of Samuel Peach Boutflower. He was educated at the Manchester Grammar School, and in 1815 entered St. John's College, Cambridge. In 1816, he gained the Hulsean theological prize. His Hulsean prize essay, which was published in 1817 at Cambridge, was entitled 'The Doctrine of the Atonement agreeable to Reason.' The degrees of B. A. and M. A. were conferred on him in 1819 and 1822, respectively, and he was ordained in 1821, when he became curate at Elmdon near Birmingham, having previously acted as assistant-master at the Manchester Grammar School.

== Career ==
In 1823, Boutflower was elected to the headmastership of the Bury Grammar School, Lancashire, and in 1832 was presented to the perpetual curacy of St. John's Church in that town. He was highly respected there as an able and conscientious clergyman and a good preacher. The rectory of Elmdon, where he first exercised his ministry, was offered to and accepted by him in 1857, and he held it until his death. He was buried at Elmdon. He collected materials for a history of Bury, which he left in a manuscript. He also published a sermon on the death of William IV, in 1837, and other sermons.
