= Donald Campbell (British Army officer, born 1764) =

- Born: c. 1764; Scotland
- Died: 6 March 1806 (aged 42); Lisbon, Portugal
- Burial place: British Cemetery, Lisbon
- Spouse: Eliza Maria
- Children: 2
- Military career
- Allegiance: Great Britain; East India Company; Portugal
- Branch: British Army; Portuguese Navy
- Service years: 1777–1784 (Britain); 1793–1806 (Portugal)
- Rank: Captain (Britain); Rear admiral (Portugal)
- Unit: 74th Regiment of Highlanders
- Commands: Serpente; Tritão; Afonso de Albuquerque
- Conflicts: American Revolutionary War; War of the First Coalition; War of the Second Coalition; Attack on Tripoli; War of the Third Coalition

Donald Campbell (c. 1764 – 6 March 1806) was a Scottish British Army officer who became an admiral in the Portuguese Navy during the French Revolutionary and Napoleonic Wars.

== Biography ==
Born in about 1764, he was the eldest son of Major John Campbell of Islay, Argyllshire. His father procured him an ensign's commission in the 74th Regiment of Highlanders. He went with his unit to fight in the American Revolutionary War for six years, and got promoted to lieutenant. In 1784, after the war ended, his regiment was disbanded and he gave all of his half-pay as a soldier to his sisters.

He then set sail for the West Indies aboard a merchantman to learn the seafaring trade. Later, he became a first mate with the East India Company and made three voyages to India on its behalf. In 1793, Portugal was encouraging British officers to join their military, and Lord Frederick Campbell recommended him to the Portuguese ambassador, the Count of Galveias. On 16 December of the same year, he was admitted into the Portuguese Navy as a captain lieutenant. One of the reasons he was accepted was his knowledge of astronomy, a field in which he was considered an expert.

He was given command of the brigantine Serpente, where he spent almost two years as part of the Mediterranean Squadron. Later, he took command of the Strait and Algarve Coast Squadrons, which would earn him a promotion to the rank of commodore.

He then served under the Marquess of Nisa, commanding naval forces in the Gulf of Naples, where he managed to prevent the French from capturing his ships. He wouls participate in other expeditions until returning to Lisbon.

He was successively promoted to frigate captain (20 October 1796), captain (30 March 1797), and commodore (18 August 1797).

In 1799, he successfully attacked the North African city of Tripoli with the intention of forcing the Pasha to sign a treaty that would hand over the city's French inhabitants.

Campbell rose to the rank of graduated rear admiral on 15 August 1805. He died on 6 March of the following year in Lisbon, at the age of 42, and is buried in Section A4 of the British Cemetery. He was married to Eliza Maria and survived by his two children and six sisters.
