= Donald Campbell (priest) =

Anglican priest

Donald Fitzherbert Campbell (23 August 1886 – 24 September 1933) was an Anglican priest in the late nineteenth and early twentieth centuries.

Campbell was educated at Charterhouse and New College, Oxford and ordained in 1910. After curacies in Liverpool and Hove he was Vicar of Vicar of Carlton Hill, Portslade and Preston.

He succeeded his father as Archdeacon of Carlisle in 1930 but was killed in a motor accident three years later.

== Notes ==
Church of England titles
Preceded by Herbert Ernest Campbell	Archdeacon of Carlisle; 1930–1933	Succeeded by Grandage Edwards Powell
