= Hugh Dacre (priest) =

Archdeacon of Carlisle

Hugh Dacre, DCL was Archdeacon of Carlisle from 1509 until his death in 1510.

Conyers was born in Cumberland and educated at Cambridge University. He also studied at Paris and Bologna. in 1505 he was appointed a Canon of Salisbury Cathedral with the Prebendal Stall of Netherbury
