= Richard Bradford (priest) =

Richard Bleaden Bradford (12 January 1913 – 4 January 1980) was Archdeacon of Carlisle from 1970 to 1978; and an Honorary Chaplain to the Queen from 1973.

He was educated at LSE and the College of the Resurrection and ordained in 1937. After curacies in the East End of London he became Vicar of St Luke, Barrow-in-Furness in 1942; and of St Aidan, Carlisle in 1951. After further incumbencies at Ainstable and Penrith he became a Residentiary Canon at Carlisle Cathedral in 1966. He retired in 1978.

== Notes ==
Church of England titles
Preceded by Charles Euston Nurse	Archdeacon of Carlisle; 1970–1978	Succeeded by Walter Frederick Ewbank
