= Joseph W. Fisher =

American politician

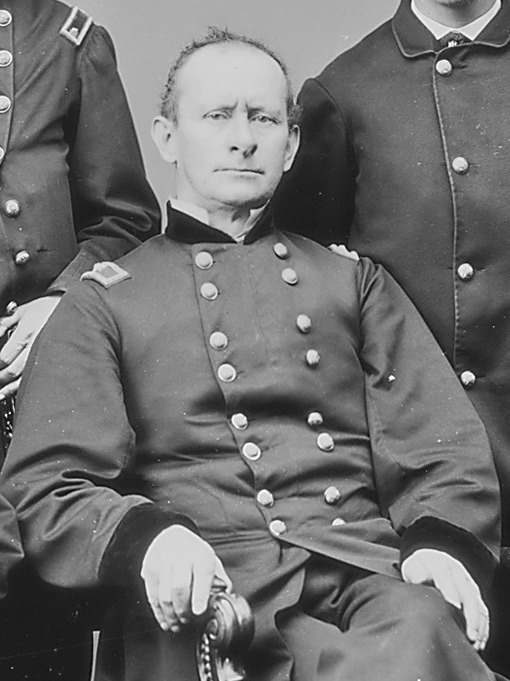

Member of the Pennsylvania House of Representatives from the 17th district
- In office 1848–1849

Joseph Washington Fisher (October 16, 1814 – October 18, 1900) was an American lawyer, politician and judge from Pennsylvania who served as a colonel in the Pennsylvania Reserves during some of the most important battles of the Army of the Potomac in the American Civil War. He served as a member of the Pennsylvania House of Representatives from 1848 to 1849, the Pennsylvania State Senate for the 17th district from 1867 to 1868 and as chief justice of the territorial courts in the Wyoming Territory from 1871 to 1879.

== Early life and career ==
Joseph W. Fisher was born in Northumberland County, Pennsylvania, and was educated in the local schools. He studied law and passed his bar exam. Licensed as an attorney, he established a profitable legal practice serving the Northumberland County region. He served as a member of Pennsylvania House of Representatives from 1848 to 1849.

== Civil War service ==
When war broke out and the Pennsylvania Reserves were organized, Fisher became lieutenant colonel of the 5th Pennsylvania Reserves. He was promoted to the rank of colonel on July 1, 1862, after Col. Seneca G. Simmons was killed in action at the Battle of Glendale. Fisher led the 5th Reserves at the Battle of Antietam and the Battle of Fredericksburg in the Reserves Division under the command of Maj. Gen. George G. Meade. At the latter battle, Fisher succeeded to command of 3rd Brigade, 3rd Division of the I Corps, when Brig. Gen. Conrad Feger Jackson was killed during Meade's assault on the Confederate right flank. The Reserves were removed from the field to recover from hard service in 1862, and Fisher commanded the brigade in the XXII Corps, Department of Washington.

When two brigades of the Reserves returned to the field in 1863, commanded by Brig. Gen. Samuel W. Crawford, Colonels Fisher and William McCandless led these units in the V Corps. They fought at the Battle of Gettysburg on the left flank of the army. Fisher's service in that battle is controversial. Col. Joshua Lawrence Chamberlain reported that his 20th Maine Infantry and Fisher's Brigade were sent to occupy Big Round Top late on July 2, 1863. Chamberlain claimed that Fisher was unwilling to advance against unknown odds and that his unit, battle worn as it was, had to lead the way. Fisher's report shows no evidence of such hesitation. He credits the 20th Maine with leading as the skirmish line because of better weapons.

Fisher continued in command of his brigade well into 1864. He fought in the Battle of the Wilderness and the Battle of Spotsylvania Court House. His last action as brigade commander was the Battle of Cold Harbor. Fisher was mustered out with his regiment on June 15, 1864. He later served as colonel of the 195th Pennsylvania Infantry. Fisher was mustered out with that regiment on January 31, 1866. He received a Brevet promotion to the rank of brigadier general on November 4, 1865.

== Postbellum career ==
After the war, Fisher resumed his legal career. He was elected to serve in the Pennsylvania State Senate for the 17th district from 1867 to 1868. Later, he moved to the Wyoming Territory and served as chief justice of the territorial courts from 1871 to 1879.

Joseph W. Fisher died in Cheyenne, Wyoming, on October 18, 1900.
