= Donald L. Campbell =

American chemical engineer

Donald Lewis Campbell
- Born: August 5, 1904; Clinton, Iowa, U.S.
- Died: September 14, 2002 (aged 98); Brick Township, New Jersey, U.S.
- Education: Iowa State University, Massachusetts Institute of Technology, Harvard Business School; University of Michigan
- Awards: Ronald H. Brown American Innovator Award; Inducted into the National Inventors Hall of Fame (1999)

Donald Lewis Campbell (August 5, 1904 – September 14, 2002) was an American chemical engineer. He and his team of three other scientists are most known for having developed the fluid catalytic cracking (FCC) process in 1942. This process provided a more efficient method for petroleum refiners to obtain high-octane gasoline by through the conversion of crude oil. The team was awarded US Patent No. 2,451,804, A Method of and Apparatus for Contacting Solids and Gases, and eventually transformed the way petroleum was developed. Their invention was especially important in World War II, as refiners could finally provide enough fuel for the Allies’ fighter planes to battle against the Axis. For his significant contributions to the field of chemical engineering, Campbell was inducted in the National Inventors Hall of Fame in 1999.

== Early life ==
Donald L. Campbell was born in Clinton, Iowa on August 5, 1904. From an early age, he showed a great fascination towards invention and solving problems. At the age of 16, Campbell took part in a national essay contest, which was sponsored by the Department of War. Twelve million contestants participated to write on the advantages of joining the army. One of the judges was General John J. Pershing. Campbell won first place. The first line of his essay read: “As Horace Greely once said, ‘Young man, go West.’ We now say, ‘Young man, join the Army.’” He was awarded the prize May 4, 1920 in Washington DC. Later, he began his higher-level education at Iowa State University, where he majored in chemical engineering and came first in his class. Afterward, he earned his master’s degree at the Massachusetts Institute of Technology. He completed his education by attending Harvard Business School.

== Beginning of career ==
His intelligence and interest in chemical engineering eventually led him to work for Exxon. He spent 41 years of his life there, 25 of which he spent in the Exxon Research and Engineering Company (ER&E). There, he became part of a team of four chemical engineers. Together, the four developed a breakthrough invention called the cracking process. Eventually, as a result of their valuable contributions and efficient teamwork, the four inventors were dubbed the “four horsemen” by their colleagues. By the end of his career, Campbell owned 30 patents.

== Major invention ==
In 1942, while working at ER&E, the “four horsemen” developed a landmark creation in the field of chemical engineering known as fluid catalytic cracking (FCC). This crucial conversion process enables petroleum refineries to obtain gasoline, aviation fuel, and olefinic gases through the conversion of hydrocarbon fractions at high temperatures. Specifically, the system consists of using high temperatures to break down large molecules of hydrogen carbon into smaller ones. This method was patented as the “Method of and Apparatus for Contacting solids and Gases Catalytic Cracking” number 2,451,804. Fortune magazine claimed that this invention is “what many engineers consider the most revolutionary chemical-engineering achievement of the last 50 years.” In 1940, using the work of Campbell and his crew, M. W. Kellogg Company operated a pilot plant in the Exxon refinery located in Baton Rouge, Louisiana. Today, this technique is in wide-use and alone produces 500 million US gallons (1,900,000 m^{3}) of gasoline per day, which is roughly half the world's demand.

== Significance in WWII ==
During World War II, as the Allies were attempting to overpower the Axis in aerial warfare, the United States suffered a shortage of aviation fuel. At this time, the testing of this new system had been successful for three years. Consequently, FCC was used to increase the national output of aviation fuel by 6,000 percent, providing enough fuel for the war efforts. Many historians argue that the increase in the efficiency of acquiring petroleum contributed to the Allies’ air victory. In addition, this process caused greater production of synthetic rubber for petroleum, therefore making the US independent of Southeast Asia's unstable source of rubber.

== Later years ==
Aside from his work, Campbell participated in other academic activities. For example, he shared thoughts with a group of academics from several fields, including filmmaking and other fields in science. He focused much of his inventive potential into the bridge games he so loved. He was a husband to Elizabeth Duff Campbell, a father to a son named Michael Duff Campbell and a daughter named Mary Louise Macom, a grandfather to eight grandchildren, and a great-grandfather to nine great-grandchildren. In 1999, he was awarded the Ronald H. Brown American Innovator Award and inducted into the National Inventors Hall of Fame because of the contributions he had made to the field of chemical engineering. Before moving into a nursing home, Campbell spent much of his time in Short Hills, New Jersey. His son Michael said that his father never felt bitter about not making money off of his inventions. Michael then said, “He was just proud to have worked with very smart men and to have accomplished something.” Campbell died on September 14, 2002.
