= Joe Fisher (journalist) =

Canadian journalist and paranormal writer

- Born: Andrew Joseph Fisher c. 1947; England
- Died: c. 2001 (aged 54-55); Fergus, Ontario
- Occupations: Writer, journalist
- Writing career
- Period: 20th century
- Genre: Paranormal

Joe Fisher (1947–2001) was a Canadian journalist and paranormal writer.

== Early life ==
Andrew Joseph Fisher was born and educated in England. In 1971 he moved to Canada, from where he mostly worked. He did not give up his British citizenship, holding a dual citizenship with Canada.

== Career ==
Fisher began his career in journalism as a junior reporter on The Staffordshire Advertiser. He later became, aged only 22, the paper's news editor. It was a record for the youngest news editor in England. After emigrating to Canada, he became an investigative reporter and feature writer for both the Toronto Sun and the Toronto Star. He also traveled frequently in between his journalistic work, visiting Greece, Ireland, Ecuador, Morocco and Peru. In these places, he researched for his own personal writing projects. His stay in Ecuador, during which time he taught English at the Colegio Americano in Quito, he wrote journals that were later published in book form as Cotopaxi Visions: Travels in Ecuador.

Fisher specialized in writing about the paranormal. His books have sold over one million copies and been translated into 22 languages.

In 2001, Fisher committed suicide in Fergus, Ontario.

== Publications ==
- Predictions (1980)
- The Case for Reincarnation (1984, revised edition 2012)
- Life Between Life (1988)
- Hungry Ghosts (1990)
- Cotopaxi Visions: Travels in Ecuador (1992)
- Game Wardens: Men and Women in Conservation (1992)
- The Siren Call of Hungry Ghosts: A Riveting Investigation Into Channeling and Spirit Guides (2001)
