= William Phelps (priest) =

Anglican Archdeacon (1797–1863)

- Born: William Whitmarsh Phelps; 1 October 1797; Wilton, Wiltshire
- Died: 22 June 1863 (aged 65); Carlisle, Cumberland
- Occupation: Priest

William Whitmarsh Phelps (1 October 1797 – 22 June 1863) was Archdeacon of Carlisle from 1863 until 1867.

Phelps was educated at Corpus Christi College, Oxford, where he matriculated in 1815 and graduated B.A. in 1819. He graduated M.A. in 1822, and was a Fellow of the college from 1822 to 1824. He was then an Assistant Master at Harrow School and Perpetual curate at Holy Trinity, Reading until his appointment as Archdeacon.

He died on 22 June 1863.

== Notes ==
Church of England titles
Preceded by William Jackson	Archdeacon of Carlisle; 1863–1867	Succeeded by Samuel Peach Boutflower
