= Donald Campbell (Australian cricketer) =

Australian cricketer

Personal information
- Born: 18 September 1851; Loddon Plains, Victoria
- Died: 14 September 1887 (aged 35); South Yarra, Melbourne, Victoria
- Batting: Right-handed

Domestic team information
- Years: Team
- 1868/69–1880/81: Victoria
- 1873–1876: Oxford University
- FC debut: 12 February 1869 Victoria v Tasmania
- Last FC: 1 January 1881 New South Wales and Victoria v Australian XI

Career statistics
Competition	First-class
Matches	25
Runs scored	643
Batting average	15.68
100s/50s	0/3
Top score	55
Balls bowled	188
Wickets	2
Bowling average	30.50
5 wickets in innings	0
10 wickets in match	0
Best bowling	1/0
Catches/stumpings	13/–
- Source: Cricinfo, 3 May 2015

Donald Campbell (18 September 1851 – 14 September 1887) was an Australian first-class cricketer. He played 25 matches for Victoria and Oxford University between 1869 and 1881.

Campbell was born at Loddon Plains in Victoria in 1851. He was educated at Christ Church, Oxford.

He died at South Yarra in Melbourne in 1887 aged 35.
