= Anne Venn =

- Born: baptized 1627
- Died: 1654; Kensington

Anne Venn (baptized 1627 – 1654) was an English religious radical and diarist. Her diaries document her worry that she was damned. She found some relief in 1652 and she gave substantial legacies to the church in Fulham.

== Life ==
Venn was born to John Venn and his wife; she was baptised in 1627. She had Puritan parents and she was a God-fearing woman. She worried that she may not be "saved" and she poured her concerns into a secret diary. She started the diary when she was nine years old. When her father died in June 1650, Venn saw this as proof that she was damned and her diary continues to document her continued damnation.

In 1652 Isaac Knight formed an independent church in Fulham and amongst the congregation was Venn and her mother.

== Death and legacies ==
Venn died in Kensington leaving £867 to Isaac Knight, other divines, religious charities and her mother. Her diary continued until very near her death despite her having written a will in November.

In 1658 her mother's husband, Thomas Weld, arranged for Venn's diary to be published. The book had an introduction by Isaac Knight. The book was titled A Wise Virgin's Lamp Burning. The diary now serves as an interesting insight into religious beliefs and of illegal religious gatherings in the 1630s.
