= Barbary–Portuguese conflicts =

16th to 19th century conflicts between the Kingdom of Portugal and the Barbary States

- Part of Barbary piracy
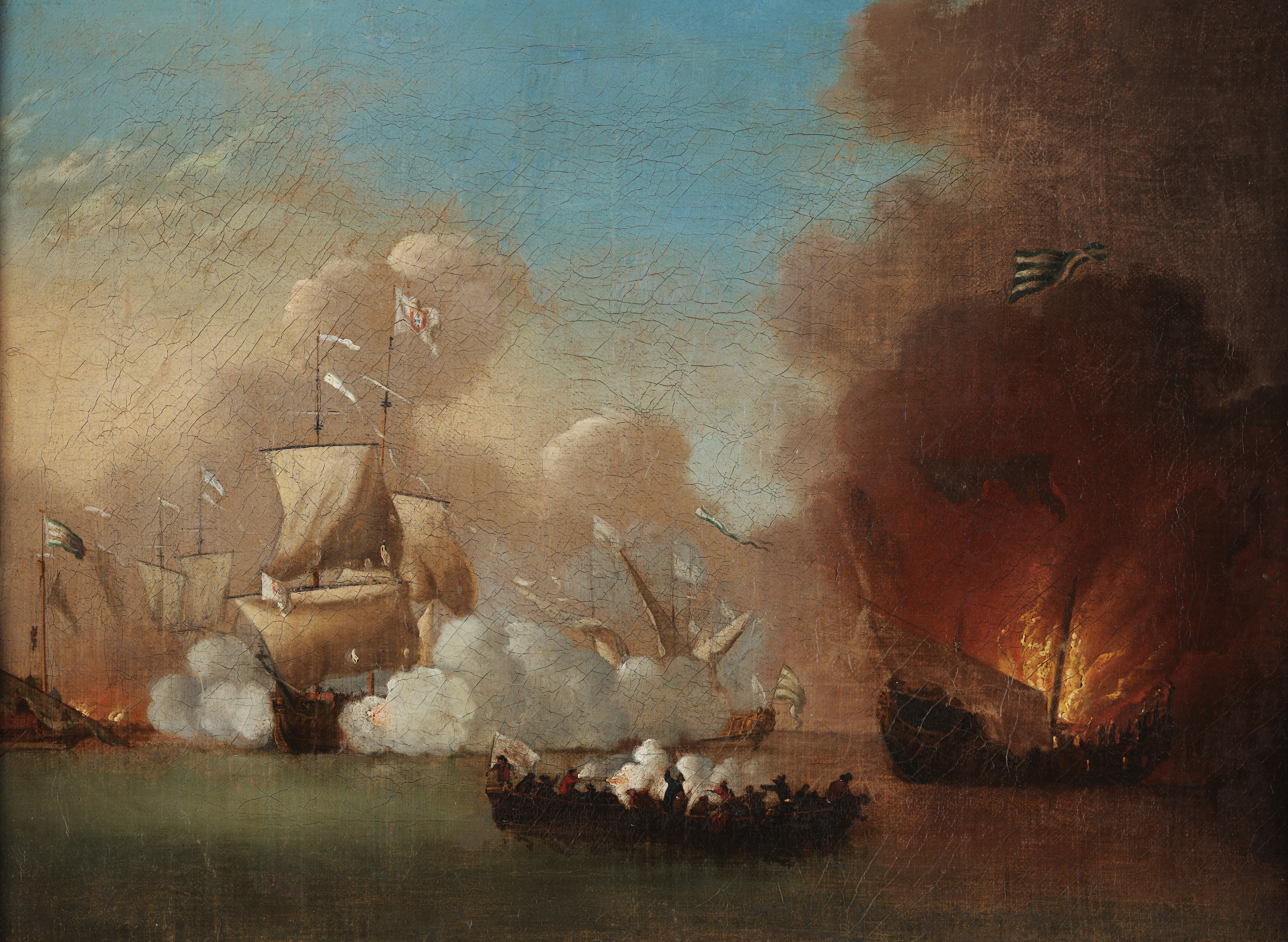
- Portuguese Action with Barbary Pirates, c. 1685
Date	16th–19th century
Location	Atlantic Ocean, Mediterranean Sea and North Africa

Belligerents
Kingdom of Portugal	Regency of Algiers; Regency of Tunis; Republic of Salé

The Barbary–Portuguese conflicts were a series of military engagements between the Kingdom of Portugal and the Barbary states of North Africa from the 16th to the 19th century.

== 16–17th century ==
=== Battle off Albufeira, 1554 ===
In 1554, off the coast of Albufeira, came eight oared vessels from Algiers, commanded by the corsair Xaramet Arraes, or Cazale, Captain-Major Dom Pedro da Cunha sailed in pursuit. Upon sighting four of the enemy ships, he gave chase. The corsairs, seeing escape was impossible, turned to battle. It lasted for over two hours before Dom Pedro's forces overcame the corsairs, killing forty and capturing the commander. Meanwhile, his brother, Dom Vasco da Cunha, engaged another corsair ship, capturing it after an hour of fight. Dom Nuno da Cunha pursued two fustas, capturing one while the other escaped into the night.

In total, over two hundred corsairs were taken, along with a hundred Christian captives, who were freed from their chains. The remaining enemy ships fled.

=== Sack of Madeira, 1617 ===
In 1617, Algerian forces arrived in Madeira with eight ships and 800 men. They raided the island, enslaving 1,200 of its inhabitants. During the attack, the Algerians destroyed the island's archives and looted various items, including church bells. It is also reported that they devastated the nearby island of Porto Santo in the Madeira archipelago, capturing 663 people and enslaving them.

=== Sinking of the Nossa Senhora da Conceição, 1621 ===
The Nossa Senhora da Conceição was a Portuguese carrack that left Goa, India, in March 1621, heading for Lisbon with 600–800 people and 22 cannons. After passing the Azores, the captain received reports of Barbary corsairs, but reassurances came from a Portuguese fleet. On October 8, the Conceição mistook a fleet of Algerian ships for friendly vessels and was surrounded. Despite fierce resistance, the Portuguese repelled the attackers after 11 hours of battle. The next day, the ship was repaired, but on October 11, it became stranded near Ericeira. The corsairs returned, launching incendiary attacks that set the ship on fire. With the crew unable to fight back, the Portuguese surrendered. The carrack sank, and the survivors were taken as prisoners to Algiers, where most remained captive. Captain Luís de Sousa died from his injuries shortly after.

=== Combat near Cabo da Roca, 1669 ===
On November 5, 1669, likely at a time when no Armada ships were patrolling the coast, two ships returning alone from Brazil engaged in combat with an Algerian frigate that had set up an ambush near Cabo da Roca. However, after the combat, the Portuguese ships managed to safely reach Lisbon.

=== Combat near Cabo de São Vicente, 1671 ===
In 1671, Barbary corsairs captured a ship returning from Mazagan and attacked a small vessel (patacho) heading to India. This occurred near Cabo de São Vicente, where the patacho had sought refuge from a storm.

=== Capture of Portuguese ships, 1674 ===
In 1674, the mission to patrol the coast was assigned to the frigate Nossa Senhora da Piedade. However, the vessel was reportedly lost in combat against Barbary corsairs from North Africa.

Later that year, despite the presence of naval patrols, a merchant charrua was captured by Barbary corsairs near Madeira. Its crew and passengers were taken to Algiers, where they were sold as slaves.

=== 1675 battles ===
In 1675, Algerian ships attacked the island of Santa Maria in the Azores. Several inhabitants of the island were captured.

In May 1675, a Portuguese fleet composed of three galleons, three ships and a frigate, among others, patrolled the coast. This force forced two corsair ships to run aground near the coast of Algiers. Additionally, the ship Madre de Deus engaged in combat with four corsair frigates near Vigo, managing to drive them away.

However, despite Portuguese efforts, the corsairs remained highly active. A corsair vessel with 16 guns captured a merchant ship armed with 26 guns in the port of Funchal. Additionally, corsairs captured several fishermen near the mouth of the Tagus River.

Later in 1675, Portuguese ships recovered three English vessels from a group of corsairs. The ship Nossa Senhora Madre de Deus fought a three-hour battle with a corsair frigate, eventually forcing it to flee. In August, two Portuguese galleons previously mentioned engaged three corsair vessels near Cádiz, sinking one of them. Around the same time, the galleon São Francisco Xavier fought against a Muslim ship during a mission near the Azores.

=== Portuguese expedition to Oran, 1677 ===
On August 1, 1677, a Portuguese naval force was assembled to relieve the city of Oran, which was under siege by Muslim forces. Although the exact actions taken by the force are unclear, it is believed they captured two enemy ships.

=== Combat off Tétouan, 1692 ===
In July 1692, a Portuguese fleet intercepted a group of Algerian corsairs off Tétouan. After a combat, the Portuguese forces set one of the corsair ships on fire and captured another, rescuing a Spanish vessel in the process.

=== Combat near Mamora, 1694 ===
In the summer of 1694, Portuguese frigates Nossa Senhora da Boaventura, Nossa Senhora da Penha de França, and others engaged a corsair ship from Algiers off Mamora, forcing it to run aground.

== 18th century ==
=== Nossa Senhora do Pópulo incident, 1702 ===
In 1702, a report came of the capture of the patacho Nossa Senhora do Pópulo by corsairs from Algiers on its route between Lisbon and Mazagan, the crew was later rescued.

=== Actions of March 1714 ===
In early March 1714, three corsair ships from Algiers attacked a Portuguese merchant ship that was coming from Brazil with a large load of sugar bound for Lisbon, between São Miguel and Lisbon. After an eight-hour battle, the corsairs eventually withdrew, and the Portuguese ship entered the Tagus River, with about 20 dead, many injured, and damage to the ship.

Later that same month, another Portuguese merchant ship, armed with 28 guns, was attacked near the Berlengas by three North African frigates, one with 50 guns, another with 40, and the last with 30. After nearly 24 hours of combat, the corsair ships eventually abandoned their target, which entered Lisbon without major issues.

=== Actions of December 1716 ===
In December 1716, a Portuguese 12–gun ship, Rio Real, had been captured off Cape Espichel by a 38–gun corsair ship after a half day combat and only after a second approach. Later, another ship, en route from Porto to Brazil, was captured 25 leagues off Lisbon. News of these actions only arrived in Portugal in March 1717.

=== Action of September 18, 1720 ===
On September 18, 1719, two Portuguese caravels, carrying wood between Galicia and Cádiz, were captured by Maghreb corsairs.

=== Attack on Cape Verde, 1723 ===
In late spring of 1723, seven merchant ships, escorted by three warships, were attacked near Cape Verde by two Barbary ships. This attack was unsuccessful, and the Portuguese ships continued their journey to Brazil.

=== Combat of Nossa Senhora da Vitória, 1723 ===
In 1723, the Nossa Senhora da Vitória, during her return from a mission in Cape Verde, encountered three Algerian ships, ranging from 60 to 35 guns, off Cabo da Roca. After a brief exchange of fire, the corsairs disappeared under cover of night. This same ship, before ending its mission, on late November, captured an Algerian ship with 36 guns, 10 of which were stone throwers, and 250 men off Cabo Mondego after a prolonged fight.

=== Action of 1724 ===
In early 1724, seven ships from Porto on their way to Bahia, three of them armed for war, confronted three Algerian ships 15 leagues off the city of Argel. No major disturbance was made.

=== Combat of Nossa Senhora da Oliveira, 1728 ===
Before July 1728, the Nossa Senhora da Oliveira fought six Algerian frigates, one with 40 guns and others with 50–56 guns, before seeking refuge under the protection of Peniche Fortress.

=== Action of July 1750 ===
Despite the presence of Portuguese warships along the coast, in late July, a ship returning from Brazil sighted two vessels off the Berlengas Islands, one of which was a captured ship, and the other an Algerian xaveco with about 300 men aboard. The corsairs attempted to board the Portuguese ship but failed, suffering heavy casualties.

=== Salé attack, 1751 ===
A Portuguese hiate traveling from Cádiz to Porto was attacked by a Salé xaveco, which attempted to board the hiate four times but eventually withdrew.

=== Action of August 1754 ===
In August 1754, three Portuguese caravelas traveling from Viana do Castelo to Lisbon were intercepted by five North African corsair ships. After several hours of combat and with casualties, the caravels were assisted by a ship from Pernambuco. The corsairs attacked again during the night but failed. One of the caravelas was lost after hitting a rock, possibly near the Berlengas.

=== Attacks on Lisbon, 1778 ===
In August 1778, Algerian corsairs captured several ships off the coast of Lisbon. In response, a warship was dispatched from Lisbon to patrol the Algarve coast, and the frigate São João Baptista was put on guard duty, remaining at sea until October.

=== Spanish attack on Algiers, 1784 ===
Because of the continuous activity of the North African corsairs, mainly against Spanish fleets, the kingdom was forced to carry out an attack on Algiers. Portugal participated in the operation, bringing their ships Santo António, S. José and Nossa Senhora do Bom Sucesso, commanded by Bernardo Ramires Esquível.

=== Combat of Tritão, 1786 ===
On May 5, 1786, a Portuguese fleet, which included the Nossa Senhora do Bom Sucesso, Princesa do Brasil, and Cisne, conducted multiple patrols in the Strait and Mediterranean, including an action against Algerian corsairs. The Tritão, commanded by captain Manuel Ferreira Nobre, fought an Algerian ship off Gibraltar, resulting in the corsair ship getting stuck and its crew fleeing.

=== Action of 26 May 1789 ===
On 26 May or early June 1789, a small Portuguese division, commanded by coronel do mar José de Melo Breyner, spotted an Algerian xebec accompanied by a captured French ship, the Le Désir, in the vicinity of Algiers. The division was constituted by the 90-gun ship of the line Nossa Senhora da Conceição, by a frigate, and by the 24-gun brigantine Lebre. The xebec was returning to its base when it was immediately attacked by the Portuguese ships, being forced to let go of his prey and flee to Algiers, where it took refuge along the coast being sheltered by the fortresses. The Lebre pursued the xebec, but after a few hours of exchanging fire, the Portuguese were unable to capture it due to shallow waters and the arrival of six reinforcements from Algiers, and ended up withdrawing. The French ship was sent to Lisbon, escorted by the Lebre, entering the Tagus on 15 or 19 June and then handed over to the consul of France. The Lebre returned to the Strait of Gibraltar on 24 June.

=== Attack on Tripoli, 1799 ===
On 11 May 1799, the Portuguese conducted a naval attack on the port of Tripoli, forcing the Bey to comply with commander Donald Campbell's demands, delivering the French residents and later signing a truce with Portugal.

=== Combat of Balão, 1800 ===
On 25 March 1800, the Portuguese cutter Balão, armed with 16 guns and with a crew of 116 men under Captain Lieutenant Count of Blosseville, sailed from Gibraltar bound to Lisbon. Shortly after leaving the port it encountered an Algerian xebec armed with 20 guns. The xebec was traveling from Cádiz to Algiers when it was intercepted and taken. Both the Balão and the captured xebec entered Lisbon on April 9, 1800.

== 19th century ==
=== Action of 8 May 1802 ===
On 8 May 1802, the frigate Cisne, armed with 36–44 guns, was the sole Portuguese vessel patrolling the Strait. On the night of May 5, the crew sighted an unknown frigate approaching. At dawn, the vessel revealed to be an Algerian corsair frigate under the command of Ra'is Hamidu ibn 'Ali. After a combat of approximately 90 minutes, the frigate Cisne was eventually captured.

=== Blockade of Gibraltar, 1806 ===
At the beginning of 1806, the Portuguese squadron assigned to the Strait consisted of two ships of the line, two frigates, and two brigantines, under the command of Luís da Mota Feo. Throughout the spring and summer, these vessels remained in constant activity, escorting Portuguese convoys and patrolling the Strait of Gibraltar and the coasts of the Algarve, Andalusia, and Morocco. As a result, two Algerian corsairs were captured, and two others were blockaded, one at Sanlúcar de Barrameda and the other at Asilah.

=== Final engagements and treaties ===
After continued expenses and losses due to Algerian corsairs, Portugal negotiated a peace treaty in 1815 that included the release of Portuguese prisoners.

In January 1818, the Esquadra do Estreito was formed, consisting of the frigates Pérola, Amazona, and Vénus, along with the xebec Bom Português. This squadron forced two Tunisian corsair ships, one of which was a corvette, to retreat into Gibraltar.

The Portuguese fleet, reinforced with smaller vessels, established a blockade of the Tunisian ships in Gibraltar, which lasted until April 12, 1819, when a new truce was signed between Portugal and Tunis.

Corsair activity based in Algiers did not entirely cease until France conquered the state in 1830, which ended the long threat.

== Bibliography ==
- Quintella, Ignacio da Costa (1839). Annaes da marinha portugueza. (Acad. das sci. de Lisboa) (in Portuguese).
- Guedes, Lívio da Costa (1988). Aspectos do Reino do Algarve nos séculos XVI e XVII (in Portuguese). Arquivo Histórico Militar.
- Salgado, Augusto Alves (2022). "Viagens e Operações Navais (1668-1823)" (PDF) (in Portuguese). Lisbon: Academia de Marinha.
- Monteiro, Armando da Silva Saturnino (1996). Batalhas e Combates da Marinha Portuguesa (1669-1807) (PDF) (in Portuguese). Lisbon: Livraria Sá da Costa Editora. Archived from the original (PDF) on 2023-03-02.
- Soares, Joaquim Pedro Celestino (1863). Quadros Navais ou Coleção dos Folhetins Marítimos do Patriota Seguidos de uma Epopeia Naval Portuguesa (in Portuguese). Lisbon: Imprensa Nacional.
