= Great Salkeld =

Village and civil parish in Cumbria, England

Coordinates: 54.717°N 2.700°W

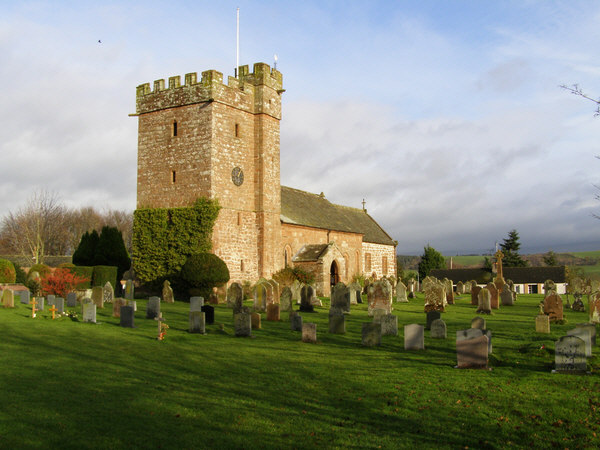
- St Cuthbert's Church

- Location in the former district of Eden, Cumbria Location within Cumbria
- Population: 412 (2011)
- OS grid reference: NY5536
- Civil parish: Great Salkeld
- Unitary authority: Westmorland and Furness
- Ceremonial county: Cumbria
- Region: North West
- Country: England
- Sovereign state: United Kingdom
- Post town: PENRITH
- Postcode district: CA11
- Dialling code: 01768
- Police: Cumbria
- Fire: Cumbria
- Ambulance: North West
- UK Parliament: Penrith and Solway

Great Salkeld is a small village and civil parish in Westmorland and Furness, Cumbria, England, a few miles to the north east of Penrith and bordering the River Eden. It was in the historic county of Cumberland until local government reorganisation in 1974. At the 2001 census the parish had a population of 445, decreasing to 412 at the 2011 Census.

The village is believed to have been connected at one time by a bridge over the River Eden to Little Salkeld. In the Middle Ages, the village was sometimes referred to in documents as Salkeld Regis as it was at times the property of the Crown.

== Description ==
It is a linear village with a fine ensemble of vernacular buildings built in the attractive local red sandstone. The village's amenities are few, but include a village hall, a pub "The Highland Drove", which has won many awards for its food, and an Anglican church. Occupying an imposing central position in the village, St Cuthbert's Church is a fortified church that was built in the 12th century, and is remarkable for the strong defensive pele tower which was added to it circa 1380. The tower room is tunnel-vaulted and the upper floor has a fireplace to make it habitable, and a doorway into the nave. A formidable yett, a door with interlaced iron bars, guards access to the tower. The Norman doorway to the church has similar features to that at St Bees Priory on the Cumbrian coast, with head masks incorporated into the zig-zag pattern. The chancel and arch were restored in 1866. There are six bells hung for full-circle ringing.

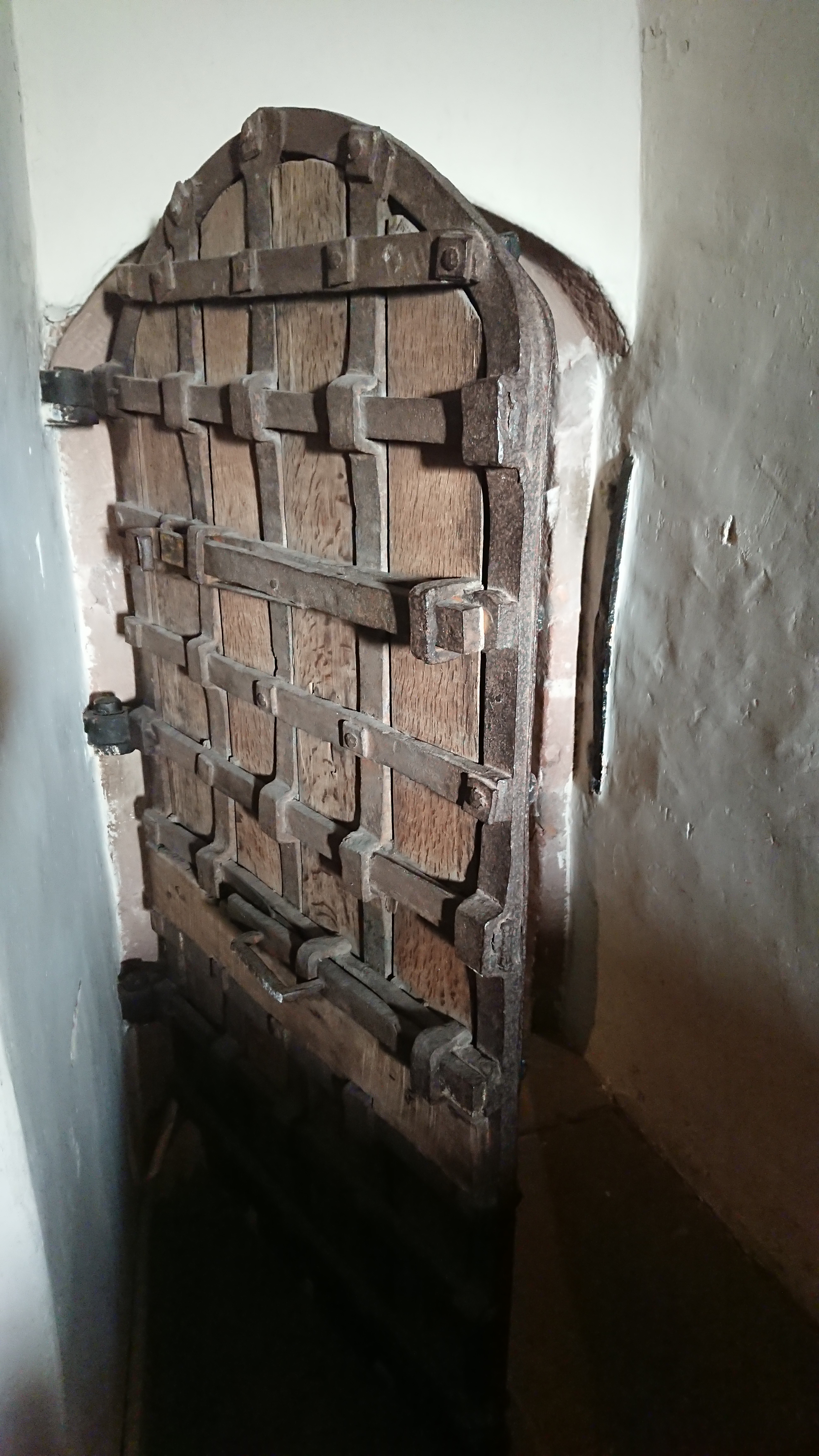
The yett or iron-barred door guarding the tower at St Cuthbert's Church, Great Salkeld

Great Salkeld Rectory, of medieval origins but modified in 1674 by Thomas Musgrave, also incorporates a pele tower, probably of the early 15th century.

The primary school, which could trace its origins back to 1515, closed in 2004 despite a rigorous campaign to save it.

The largest house in the parish is Nunwick Hall, built in 1892 to a design in the Tudor style by Charles John Ferguson. The local cricket team is named after it. This building should not be confused with the eighteenth-century Nunwick Hall in Northumberland.

== Surrounding hamlets ==
The parish of Great Salkeld includes the hamlets of Salkeld Dykes, which is divided into North and South Dykes, Halfwaywell, Inglewood Bank and Burrell Green.

== See also ==
- Listed buildings in Great Salkeld
