= Albert David (bishop) =

British bishop

- Bishop of Liverpool
- David as Bishop of Liverpool, 1925.
- Diocese: Diocese of Liverpool
- In office: 1923–1944
- Predecessor: Francis Chavasse
- Successor: Clifford Martin
- Other posts: Headmaster, Clifton College (1905–1909); Headmaster, Rugby School (1909–1921); Bishop of St Edmundsbury and Ipswich (1921–1923)

Orders
- Ordination: 1895 (priest)
- Consecration: 1921 by Randall Davidson

Personal details
- Born: 19 May 1867 Exeter, Devon, United Kingdom
- Died: 24 December 1950 (aged 83) Trebetherick, Cornwall, UK
- Denomination: Anglican
- Parents: William David & Antonia Altgelt
- Spouse: Eda Miles
- Children: 3 sons; 1 daughter
- Education: Queen's College, Oxford

Albert Augustus David (19 May 1867 – 24 December 1950) was an Anglican bishop and schoolmaster.

After obtaining a first class degree at Oxford he lectured at his old college, and had spells as a schoolmaster. From 1905 to 1909 he was headmaster of Clifton College, and from 1909 to 1921 he held the same post at Rugby School. In 1921 he was appointed Bishop of St Edmundsbury and Ipswich, a post he held for only two years, being appointed Bishop of Liverpool in 1923, remaining there until his retirement in 1944.

== Life and career ==
=== Early years ===
David was born in Exeter, the second of three sons of William David (a priest), and his wife, Antonia, née Altgelt. His father was principal of the Exeter Diocesan Training College, and later simultaneously priest-vicar of the cathedral and rector of St Petrock with St Kerrian, Exeter. All three of William David's sons became clergymen. David was educated at Exeter School and in 1885 won a classical scholarship to Queen's College, Oxford, He gained a first-class degree in literae humaniores in 1889.

After graduating David remained at Oxford as a lecturer for a year. He then took up a post as a master at Bradfield College and moved in 1892 to a similar position at Rugby School. He was ordained priest in 1895. In 1899 he returned to Queen's as a fellow, assistant tutor, precentor and junior bursar. In 1901 he had his first contact with the Diocese of Liverpool, being appointed examining chaplain to Francis Chavasse, Bishop of Liverpool, which post he combined with his Oxford duties.

=== Headmaster ===
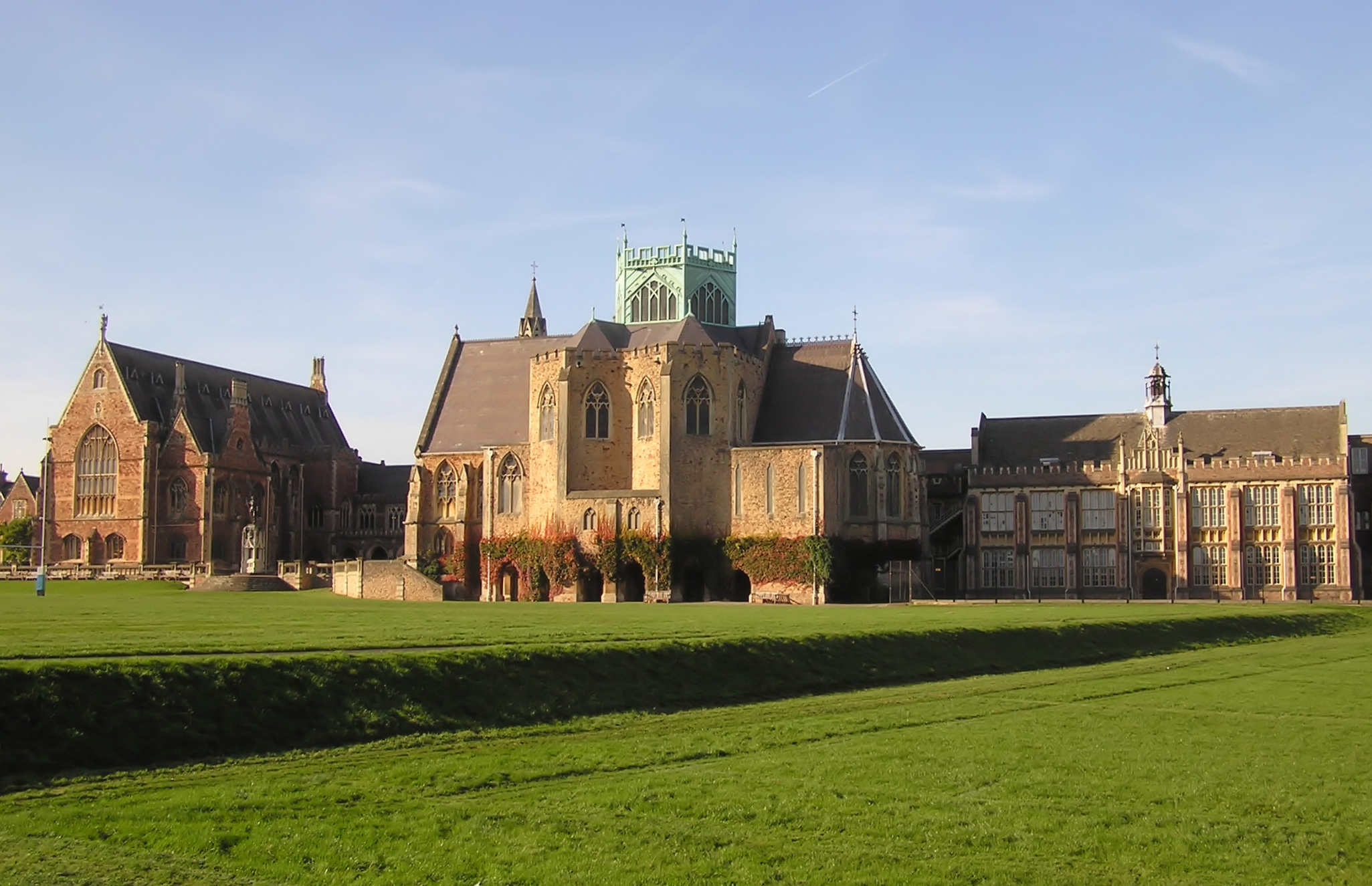
Clifton College, where David was headmaster from 1905 to 1909

In 1905 David accepted the headmastership of Clifton College, in succession to Michael George Glazebrook, under whom the school had suffered a severe decline in numbers. David's biographer Matthew Grimley writes, "A tall and imposing presence, he was a great success with masters, boys, and the school's trustees. He introduced physical drill into the curriculum, expanded the chapel and grounds, and increased pupil numbers." The Times obituarist considered David's four years at Clifton to be among the smoothest and most successful of his life, and the paper had commented in 1909, "His work there has been remarkably successful, and at present there is not a vacant place in the college."

In November 1909 David married Eda Mary Miles with whom he had three sons and one daughter. In the same month as his marriage David was selected as headmaster of Rugby in succession to Herbert Armitage James. His return was welcomed by the staff, but his unorthodox views on teaching soon met considerable opposition in some quarters. David maintained that a schoolmaster should study his pupils rather than subjects, and that too much attention was concentrated on the few cleverest pupils. He held that very few boys were stupid, and that there should be "a larger measure of controlled freedom in work and a wider choice of occupations should be contrived for the majority". Some of the older members of his staff considered that David's methods would undermine discipline and damage the school's reputation. In 1910, David was awarded a Doctorate of Divinity.

=== Bishop ===
Having previously declined invitations to accept a bishopric, David agreed in 1921 to become Bishop of St Edmundsbury and Ipswich. He was consecrated bishop in Westminster Abbey by Randall Davidson, Archbishop of Canterbury, on 25 July 1921, and was enthroned in St Edmundsbury Cathedral on 29 September the same year. In contrast with his predecessor, the first bishop, Henry Hodgson who was a member of the high church wing of the Church of England, David was an evangelical. The Manchester Guardian said of him, "deep spirituality, allied with no little indifference to ecclesiastical forms, and even to dogmatic affirmations, may be said to be Dr David's chief characteristic."

The largely rural diocese was roughly coterminous with Suffolk, and consisted of 436 parishes. It was of recent creation, having been established by Act of Parliament in 1913, hiving off parts of the dioceses of Norwich and Ely. By an error in the drafting of the Act, the cathedral of the diocese was in Bury St Edmunds and the bishop's residence was in Ipswich, and communications within the diocese were not ideal. David remained in the diocese for only two years, scarcely time to get to know his clergy or to visit more than a few of the parishes.

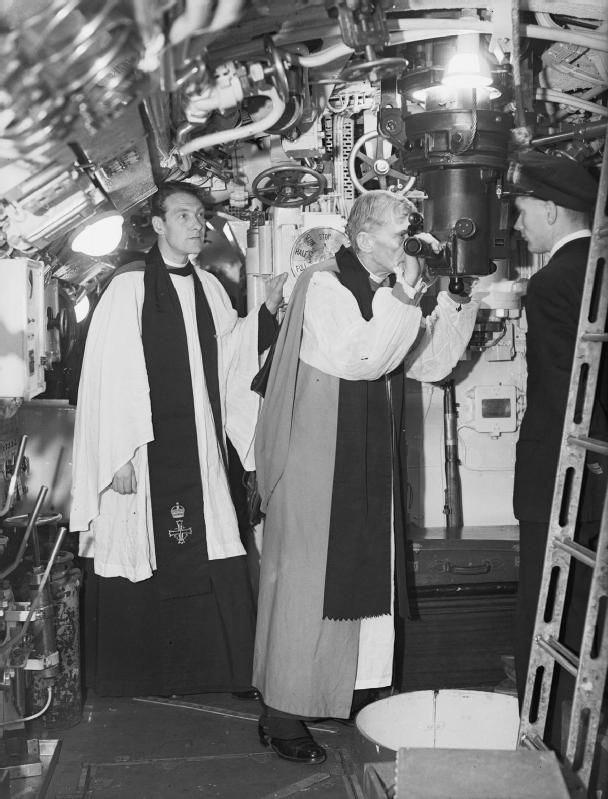
David looks through the periscope of a British submarine after the blessing ceremony, World War II

In 1923 David was translated to be Bishop of Liverpool. Succeeding Chavasse was a difficult task. The Manchester Guardian said of him, "In Dr. Chavasse Liverpool has enjoyed a true Chief Pastor, a Father-in-God, who, if he was not always right (no man is) was always honoured and beloved." A historian of Liverpool Cathedral, Peter Kennerley, describes David as "imaginative, enthusiastic, an innovator and educator strong on organisation and administrative structures, liberal and yet autocratic in his ways." As the cathedral was unfinished and unconsecrated (except for the Lady Chapel) there was no Dean, nor was there a Chapter. David was responsible for the building and for securing the funds for its completion.

The first section of the main body of the cathedral was complete by 1924. It comprised the chancel, an ambulatory, chapter house and vestries. The section was closed with a temporary wall, and on 19 July 1924, the 20th anniversary of the laying of the foundation stone, the cathedral was consecrated in the presence of George V and Queen Mary, and bishops and archbishops from round the globe. The building remained David's responsibility until 1931, when by Order in Council the Dean and Chapter of the cathedral were incorporated. After eight years of responsibility for the building David found it hard to relinquish control to the new Dean and Chapter. Frederick Dillistone, a later Dean, commented, "To put it bluntly the Bishop found it difficult to keep his hands off the Cathedral."

Relations between Frederick Dwelly, Dean of Liverpool, and David were at first harmonious, but soured after Dwelly miscalculated public opinion and permitted a Unitarian to preach at a normal service in the cathedral. David had earlier permitted another Unitarian to preach at a non-liturgical service, but it was regarded by many as intolerable that a non-Anglican should preach in an Anglican service. David publicly supported Dwelly during the ensuing furore, but was obliged to endure the humiliation of being formally reproved by William Temple, Archbishop of York (his former pupil at Rugby), in provincial synod in 1934. David sought to reach out to nonconformists, but found himself embroiled in a controversy with the local Roman Catholic diocese over what he described as the "terrorizing methods" used by its priests to prevent Catholics from marrying Protestants.

In 1935 David's health deteriorated, impaired, according to his biographer Harold Costley-White, "by the burdens and anxieties of his office". He travelled to Australia, and returned "refreshed and with a wider vision of the opportunities of the Church in the Empire". After raising a sum of £85,000 for his diocese, he retired in 1944. Kennerley writes that David was more respected than loved in the diocese. After he retired there came "a great improvement in the relationship between Cathedral and diocese."

David retired to Trebetherick in Cornwall, where he died at the age of 83.

== Sources ==
- Cotton, Vere E. (1964). The Liverpool Cathedral Official Handbook. Liverpool: Littlebury Bros for Liverpool Cathedral Committee. OCLC 44551681.
- Dillistone, F. W. (1975). Charles Raven – Naturalist, historian, Theologian. London: Hodder and Stoughton. ISBN 0340193131.
- Kennerley, Peter (1991). The Building of Liverpool Cathedral. Preston, Lancashire: Carnegie Publishing. ISBN 0-948789-72-7.

Church of England titles
Preceded by Henry Hodgson	Bishop of St Edmundsbury and Ipswich; 1921–1923	Succeeded by Walter Whittingham
Preceded by Francis Chavasse	Bishop of Liverpool; 1923–1944	Succeeded by Clifford Martin
Academic offices
Preceded by Michael George Glazebrook	Headmaster of Clifton College; 1905–1909	Succeeded by John Edward King
Preceded by Herbert Armitage James	Head Master of Rugby School; 1910–1921	Succeeded by William Wyamar Vaughan
