= Holy Trinity Church, Rotherhithe =

Holy Trinity Church
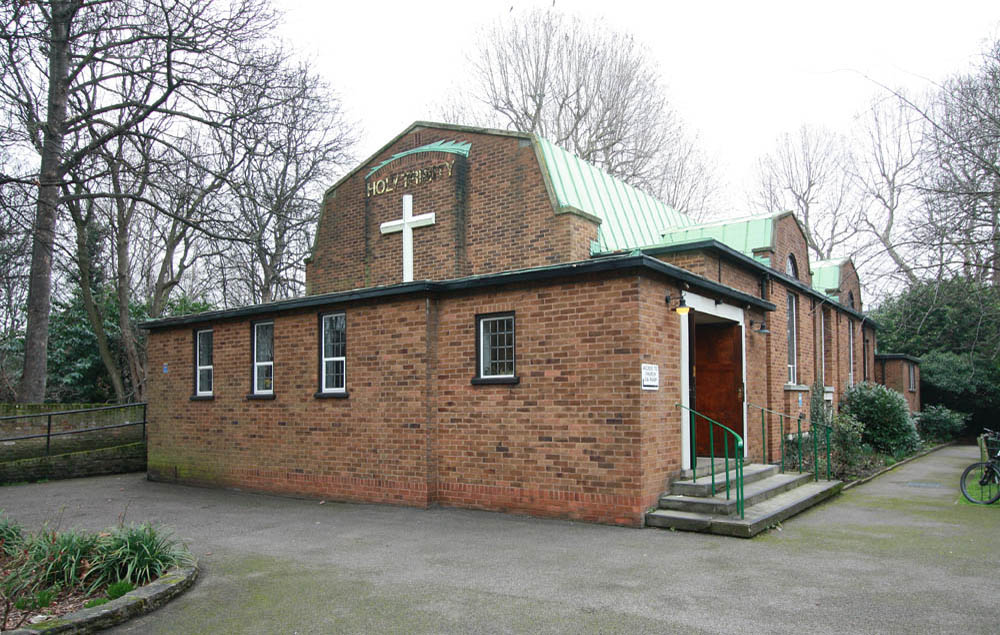
- Holy Trinity Church
- 51°30′02″N 0°02′05″W
- Country: England
- Denomination: Church of England

History
- Status: active
- Dedicated: 1957

Architecture
- Architect: Thomas Ford

Administration
- Diocese: Southwark
- Archdeaconry: Southwark
- Parish: Holy Trinity, Rotherhithe

Clergy
- Vicar: Fr Andrew Doyle

Holy Trinity Church is a Church of England parish church in Rotherhithe, south east London, within the diocese of Southwark.

== History ==
The original church on the site was built between 1837 and 1838, as the expansion of the Surrey Commercial Docks drove a growth of population that exhausted the capacity of the original parish of St Mary's Church, Rotherhithe. The building was designed in a neo-Gothic style by Sampson Kempthorne, better known as a designer of workhouses:

The church consists of a shallow sanctuary recess and a wide barn-like nave with vestibules and a tower at the west. The nave is lit by large lancet windows and the whole church is meanly designed in 13th-century style. The tower has an embattled parapet.

The churchyard was closed to burials in 1858, and was converted by the Metropolitan Public Gardens Association into a small public garden in 1885.

The original church building was destroyed by incendiary bombs during an air raid on 7 September 1940, making it the first British Church to be destroyed in the Second World War. The bombed church had an organ by Henry Bevington. The Vicar throughout the War was the Rev Joseph Thrift. On the night of the bombing, Thrift escaped with just the clothes on his back. He made sure that all around were safely away, before making his way from the burning remains of the church by rowing-boat to Stepney, bombs falling around him as he went. After the bombing, Thrift advertised in the Church Times: "Holy Trinity, Rotherhithe. Church bombed and everything destroyed. Can you supply one of our immediate needs?" The adjacent school buildings (already condemned in 1939) survived the War, were used for services until the completion of the present church in 1959, and remain in use as the Church Hall. The WWI war memorial also survived the bombing, and is now Grade II listed.

The new church building was constructed to a 1957 design by Thomas Ford, and features a distinctive mural of the crucifixion and resurrection of Jesus by the Jewish-born German artist Hans Feibusch.

The church has been described as having a fine acoustic, and since 2016 has hosted regular concerts of music written in the fifteenth, sixteenth and seventeenth centuries by early music ensemble Musica Antica Rotherhithe.

== Vicars ==
- 1836-51 William P H Hutchinson. Hutchinson was subsequently Prebendary of Curborough in Lichfield Cathedral.
- 1851-59 John Robert Turing.
- 1859-88 James Wilson.
- 1888-1901 Henry Horne Selby-Hele. Selby-Hele and Sweeting exchanged benefices in 1901.
- 1901-05 Walter Debenham Sweeting. Sweeting wrote the volumes on Peterborough (1898) and Ely (1901) in Bell's Cathedral Series.
- 1905-14 Harold Robert Parnell Tringham
- 1914-21 William Houghton Hacksley
- 1921-58 Joseph Thrift
- 1958-68 Oswald H D Batty
- 1968-84 Frank Carter
- 1985-96 Peter Maurice. Maurice was Bishop of Taunton, 2006–15.
- 1997–present Andrew Doyle

== Gallery ==
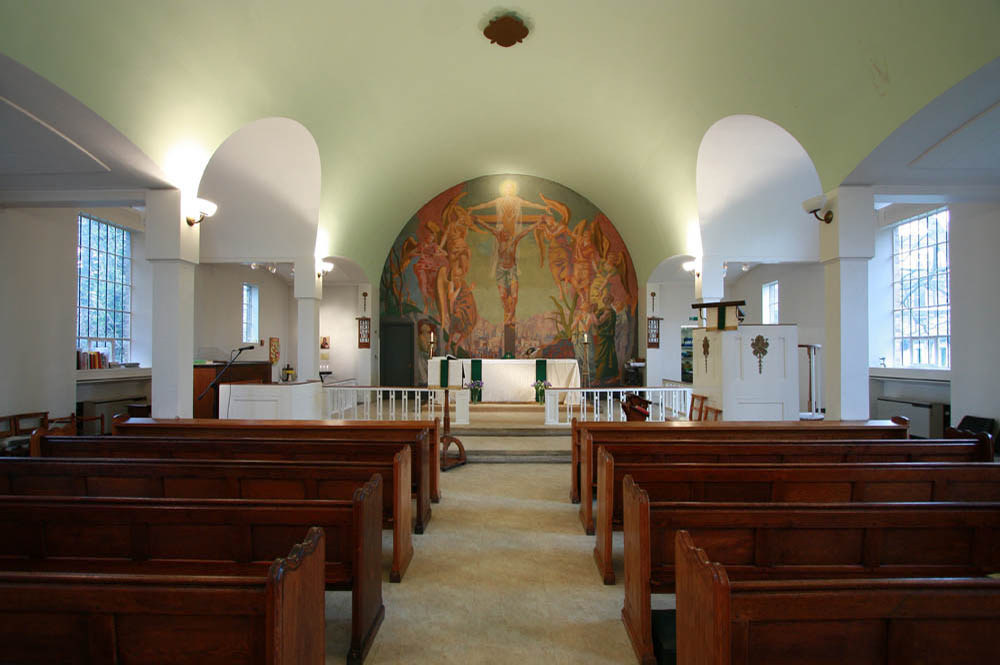
Church interior

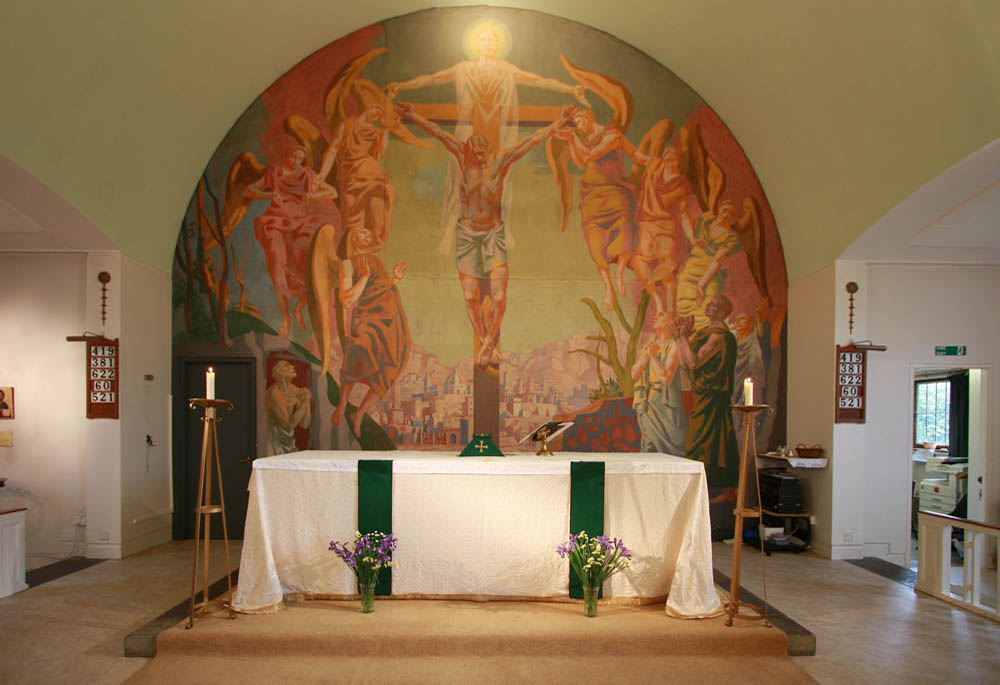
Sanctuary with mural

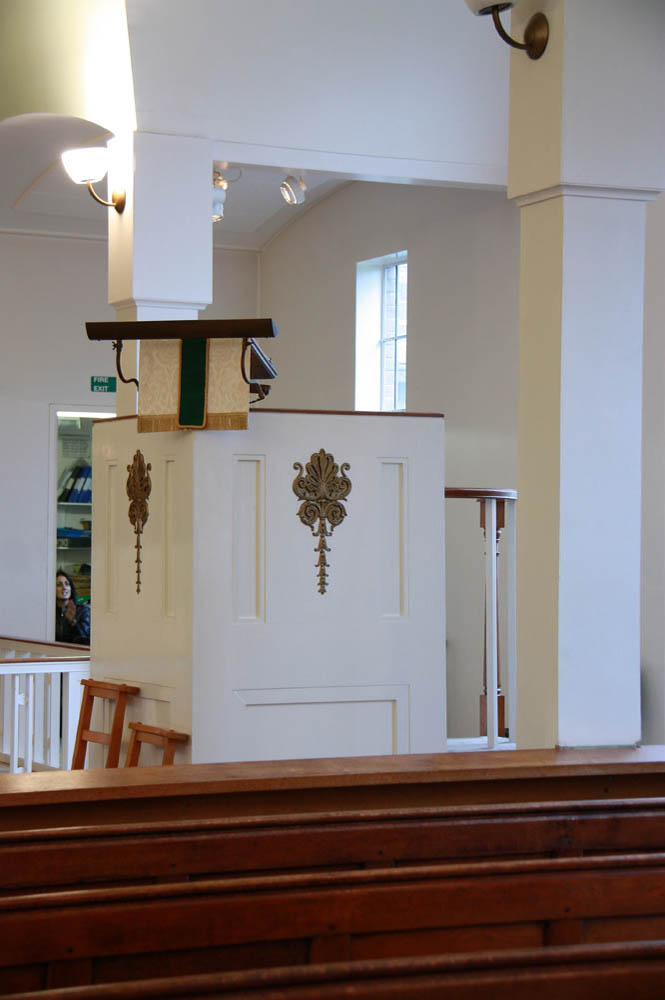
Pulpit

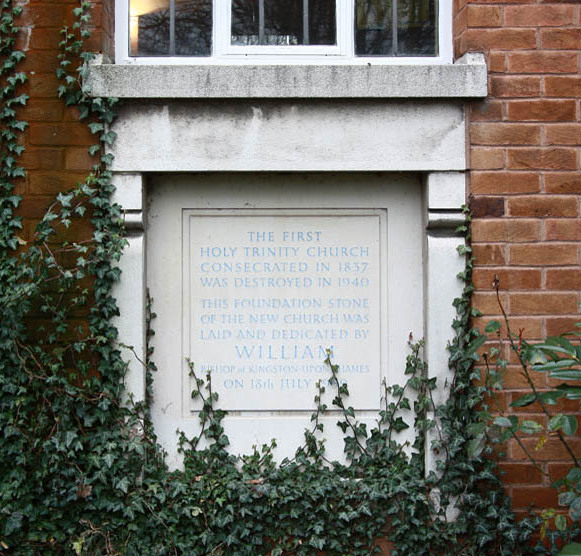
Foundation stone
