= Andrew Radford =

Andrew Radford may refer to:

- Andy Radford (1944–2006), Anglican Evangelical bishop and religious broadcaster
- Andrew Radford (linguist) (1945–2024), British linguist
