= Dillistone =

Dillistone is a surname. Notable people with the surname include:

- Frederick Dillistone (1903–1993), Dean of Liverpool
- Marcus Dillistone (born 1961), British film director
