= Fiona Gibson =

British Anglican priest

The Right Reverend Fiona Gibson
- Bishop of Taunton
- Diocese: Diocese of Bath and Wells
- In office: 6 February 2026 – present
- Predecessor: Ruth Worsley
- Other posts: Archdeacon of Ludlow, and Prebendary of Hereford Cathedral (2021–2026)

Orders
- Ordination: 2011 (deacon); 2012 (priest)
- Consecration: 6 February 2026 by Stephen Cottrell

Personal details
- Born: 1970 (age 55–56)
- Spouse: Dave Gibson
- Children: 2
- Education: Homerton College, Cambridge; Oak Hill College

Fiona Ruth Gibson (born 1970) is a British Anglican bishop. Since 2026, she has been the Bishop of Taunton — the sole suffragan bishop of the Church of England's Diocese of Bath and Wells.

== Early life and education ==
Gibson grew up in north London. She studied history and education at Homerton College, Cambridge, graduating with a Bachelor of Education (BEd) degree in 1993. She then worked as a primary school teacher, first in Ware, Hertfordshire and then in Enfield, London. She left teaching to become a lay children's minister at Christ Church, Cockfosters, between 2002 and 2007. She trained for ordination at Oak Hill Theological College, during which she undertook a Master of Theology (MTh) degree, graduating in 2011. She later undertook postgraduate study in divinity at Trinity College Bristol (accredited by the University of Aberdeen), completing a Doctor of Philosophy (PhD) degree in 2025. Her doctoral thesis was titled "Unmasking the "Noonday Demon" in the 21st Century: An Exploration of Theological Anthropology and Hamartiology by Way of Close Examination of the Vice of Acedia", and was supervised by Justin Stratis and Alison Walker.

== Ordained ministry ==
She was ordained in the Church of England as a deacon in 2011 and as a priest in 2012. After a curacy in Bedford, she was vicar of the Church of All Saints, Cople, St John’s Moggerhanger and at Willington from 2014 until her appointment as archdeacon. She was collated as Archdeacon of Ludlow on 25 April 2021.

Gibson is an evangelical Anglican. She is a former member of the council of Oak Hill College, a conservative evangelical theological college, and vice chair of The Junia Network, a group for evangelical Anglican female clergy.

On 22 October 2025, it was announced that she is to be the next Bishop of Taunton, the suffragan bishop of the Diocese of Bath and Wells. She was consecrated as a bishop, legally taking up her See, on 6 February 2026.

== Personal life ==
Gibson is married to Dave, and together they have two children.

Church of England titles
Preceded by Alistair Magowan	Archdeacon of Ludlow; 2021–2026	TBA
Preceded by Ruth Worsley	Bishop of Taunton; 2026–present	Incumbent
