= George Hollis (bishop) =

British Anglican bishop (1868–1944)

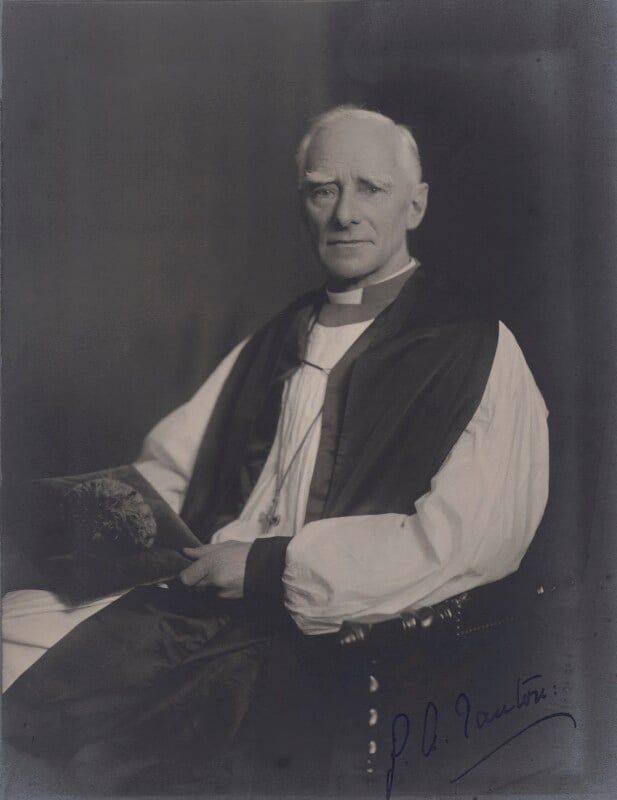
Hollis c. 1920s

George Arthur Hollis (17 April 1868 – 20 March 1944) was a British Anglican bishop. He was bishop of Taunton (a suffragan bishop in the Diocese of Bath and Wells) from 1931 to 1944.

== Early life ==
Hollis was born on 17 April 1868. He was educated at Keble College, Oxford.

== Ordained ministry ==
Hollis was ordained in the Church of England in 1894. He began his ecclesiastical career with a curacy at St James Wednesbury, followed by a spell as Perpetual Curate of St Bartholomew Armley. After this he was Vicar of Headingley and then the principal of Wells Theological College, before a 14-year stint as bishop of Taunton.

== Personal life ==
He married Mary Margaret Church (1874-1941), herself the daughter of an Anglican minister, at Wells Cathedral on 5 July 1898. Their son Christopher was MP for Devizes from 1945 to 1955, and another son Roger was director general of MI5 from 1956 to 1965. Of grandchildren: Adrian Hollis, Roger's son, was a chess champion and Classics don; while another is, like George, a bishop: Christopher's son, Crispian was the Roman Catholic Bishop of Portsmouth from 1989 to 2012.

== Death ==
He died on 20 March 1944.

Church of England titles
Preceded by Charles de Salis	Bishop of Taunton; 1931–1944	Succeeded by Harry Thomas
