= Frederick Dwelly =

The Very Reverend Frederick William Dwelly
- Dean of Liverpool
- Church: Church of England
- Appointed: 1931

Orders
- Ordination: 1907

Personal details
- Born: 9 April 1881 Chard, Somerset, UK
- Died: 9 May 1957 (aged 76) Liverpool, UK
- Education: Chard Endowed School and Queens' College, Cambridge

Frederick William Dwelly (9 April 1881 – 9 May 1957) was the first Dean of Liverpool.

From a modest family background, Dwelly worked as a shop assistant in London before the vicar of the church he attended there spotted his potential, and arranged sponsorship for the young Dwelly to study at Queens' College, Cambridge. After graduation, he became an Anglican priest. In 1916 he took over a parish in the Diocese of Liverpool, and was appointed to devise the form of service for the consecration of the new Liverpool Cathedral in 1924. When the cathedral was sufficiently established to need a dean to run it, Dwelly was appointed to the position, taking office in 1931.

At Liverpool Dwelly was responsible for devising fresh forms of service, refreshing the liturgy. He was consulted by the authorities of other cathedrals including Canterbury to advise on the forms of worship for special services. His willingness to innovate led to controversy in 1934, when he permitted a Unitarian to deliver a sermon in the cathedral; many felt that it was improper to allow non-Anglicans to preach in an Anglican church.

Dwelly's liturgical and other legacies to Liverpool Cathedral are commemorated in a life-size carving of him on the memorial to him in the cathedral, unveiled in 1960, five years after his death.

== Life and career ==
=== Early years ===
Dwelly was born in Chard, Somerset, the youngest of the ten children of Robert Dwelly, a carriage builder, and his wife, Caroline, née Cooper. Robert Dwelly was a local Councillor, and like his wife, a dedicated member of the Church of England. The young Dwelly was educated at the local grammar school, known as Chard Endowed School. In his later years at the school he frequently played truant, absenting himself to listen to music. The headmaster was indulgent, but when these truancies came to the notice of Robert Dwelly, Frederick was removed from the school and sent in 1898 to live in London. He is thought to have stayed with his elder brother Herbert and sister-in-law Florence. and according to his eventual successor as Dean of Liverpool, Frederick Dillistone, he worked as a salesman in a large department store near Oxford Circus. Dwelly's biographer Peter Kennerley identifies the store as Marshall & Snelgrove, which was a short distance from All Souls Church, Langham Place, where Dwelly became a member of the congregation. He devoted his spare time to religious and social work in the slums of Spitalfields and to improving his knowledge of the arts.

William Inge: an early influence on Dwelly

The rector of All Souls at the time was Prebendary Francis Scott Webster (1859–1920), described by Dillistone as a noted Evangelical leader. He spotted Dwelly's potential; with the assistance of a businessman whose identity is not known he made it possible for the young man to go to Queens' College, Cambridge in 1903, to study theology with a view to ordination. There is some evidence that at Cambridge Dwelly became disillusioned with the predictable forms of worship, and was becoming less inclined to seek ordination. Any doubts he had were removed when he came under the influence of the Rev William Ralph Inge. In Lent term 1906 Inge gave a series of lectures under the title "Truth and Falsehood in Religion". His mixture of the down-to-earth and the mystic had a deep influence on Dwelly.

Ordained in 1907, Dwelly began his ecclesiastical career with curacies at St Mary Windermere and Cheltenham Parish Church. In June 1907 he married Mary Bradshaw Darwin (1880–1950), daughter of the physician George Henry Darwin. There were no children of the marriage.

During the First World War Dwelly was a temporary chaplain to the British Armed Forces. In 1916 he was appointed vicar of Emmanuel Church, Southport. When Liverpool Cathedral was consecrated in July 1924 there was no established form of service for the inauguration of a new cathedral, and Albert David, Bishop of Liverpool appointed Dwelly ceremoniarius, charged with researching, devising and running the consecration service. The biographer Peter Kennerley writes that the immense success of the service made Dwelly widely known. The Manchester Guardian recorded that the ceremony, attended by the King and Queen, "was an affair of ecclesiastical pomp such as this realm has not seen for many centuries not for many years is likely to see again."

The following year Dwelly was appointed a Canon Residentiary of the cathedral. His guidance was sought by other cathedrals; he was largely responsible for the enthronement service of Cosmo Lang as Archbishop at Canterbury in 1928.

Dwelly was appointed vice-dean of Liverpool in 1928 and at the foundation of the deanery and chapter in 1931 he became the first dean of Liverpool, a position he held until 1955.

=== Dean of Liverpool ===
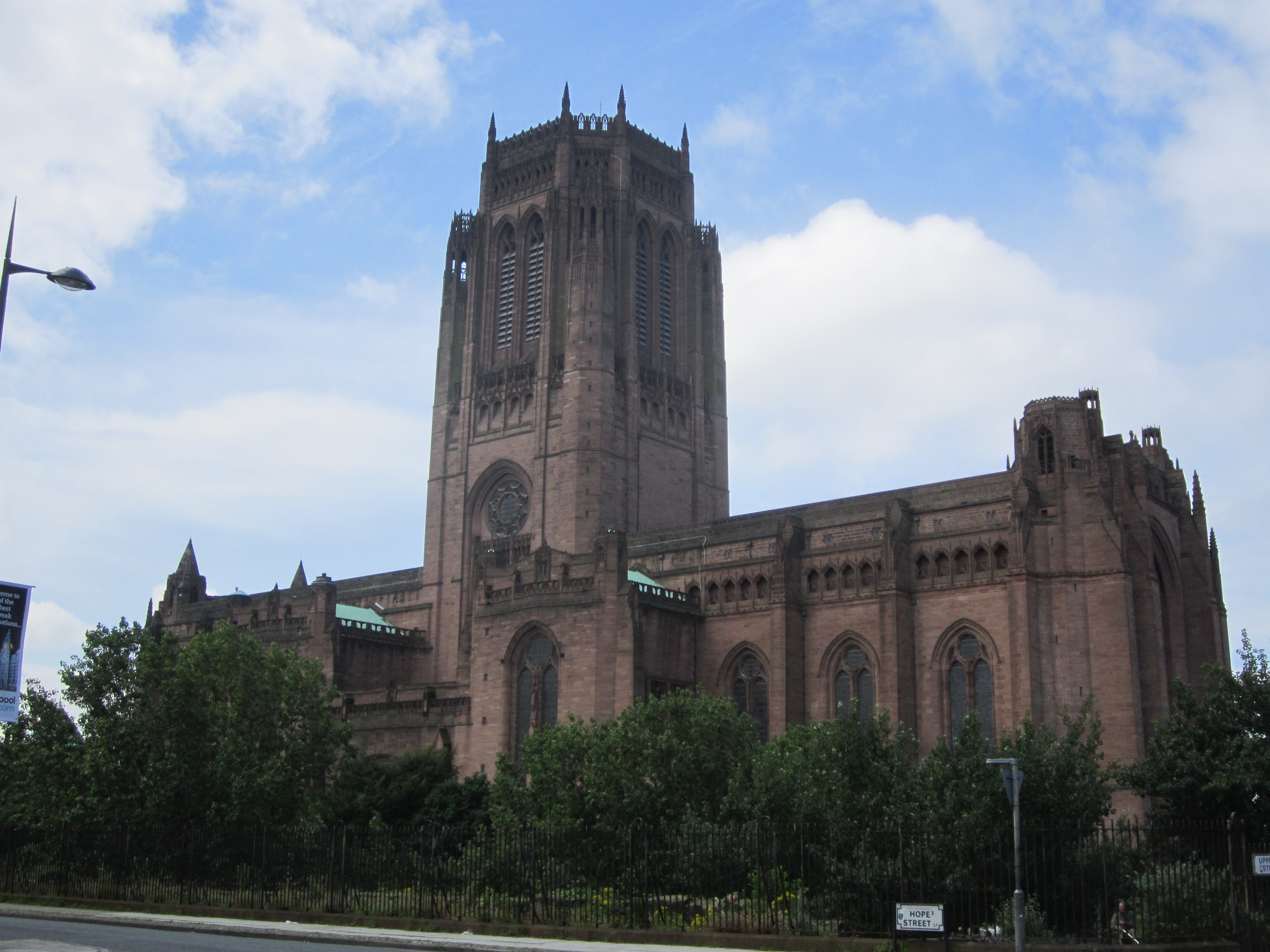
Liverpool Cathedral (2012 photograph)

Dwelly's years as dean brought him national fame and some notoriety. Having devised the form of service for the consecration of the cathedral, he continued creating special services of, in Kennerley's words "freshness, relevance, and originality which placed Liverpool in the vanguard of developments in cathedral worship across the country". William Temple, Archbishop of Canterbury, and Cyril Garbett, Archbishop of York both praised the unique distinction of the forms of worship at Liverpool. Garbett said in a sermon in the cathedral in 1945, "Here, directed by the skill of your Dean, your public worship has been made beautiful with music and symbolism. In the richness and colour and pageantry as well as variety and originality, your services hold a special place in the Anglican Communion". Later deans were assisted by a Canon Precentor, but Dwelly bore sole responsibility for devising services during his years as dean.

Notoriety arose from a strident controversy in 1934, when Dwelly miscalculated public opinion and permitted a Unitarian to preach at a normal service in the cathedral. Bishop David had earlier permitted another Unitarian to preach at a non-liturgical service, but it was regarded by many as intolerable that a non-Anglican should preach in an Anglican service. David publicly supported Dwelly during the ensuing furore, but was formally reproved by the Archbishop at the synod of the province of York in 1934. Relations between bishop and dean were already strained by David's attempts to interfere in the business of the dean and chapter in running the cathedral, (Note: F W Dillistone, a later dean, commented, "To put it bluntly the Bishop found it difficult to keep his hands off the Cathedral.") Their relationship was further damaged by the Unitarian episode.

Dwelly's devotion to the cathedral was demonstrated during the Second World War, when he took up residence within the building, making a bedroom of a small, unheated room off a tower staircase. From there he supervised continuous firewatching during the Blitz. In 1947 he accepted an invitation from the University of Cambridge to preach a series of lectures on pastoral theology. After the war, his marriage came under strain, with his wife becoming reclusive; she died in 1950. Dwelly suffered a decline in his physical and mental health, and resigned as dean in 1955, being appointed "Dean Emeritus". He died at his home in Toxteth, Liverpool, on 9 May 1957. After the funeral service in the cathedral his body was cremated; his ashes were placed in a memorial to him in the south choir aisle, sculpted by Carter Preston, which was unveiled in December 1960.

== Notes, references and sources ==
=== Sources ===
- Cotton, Vere E (1964). The Book of Liverpool Cathedral. Liverpool: Liverpool University Press. OCLC 2286856.
- Dillistone, F W (1975). Charles Raven, Naturalist, Historian, Theologian. London: Hodder and Staughton. ISBN 0340193131.
- Fox, Adam (1960). Dean Inge. London: John Murray. OCLC 727943.
- Kennerley, Peter (1991). The Building of Liverpool Cathedral. Preston, Lancashire: Carnegie House. ISBN 0948789727.
- Kennerley, Peter (2004). Frederick William Dwelly, First Dean of Liverpool, 1881–1957. Lancaster: Carnegie House. ISBN 1859361331.

Religious titles
Preceded by Inaugural appointment	Dean of Liverpool; 1931–1955	Succeeded by Frederick William Dillistone
