= Charles de Salis =

British Anglican bishop (1860–1942)

- Bishop of Taunton
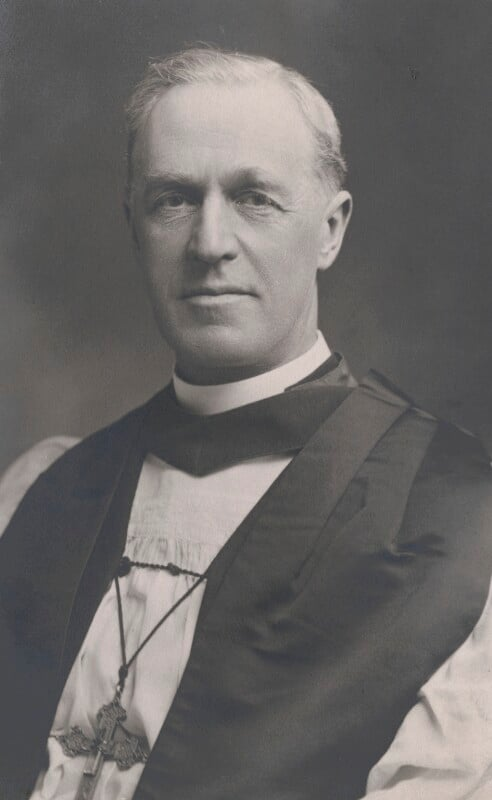
- De Salis, 1920s–1930s
- Diocese: Diocese of Bath and Wells
- In office: 1911–1930
- Predecessor: William Finch (16th century)
- Successor: George Hollis
- Other posts: Archdeacon of Taunton (1911–1938); Assistant Bishop of Bath and Wells (1931–1942)

Orders
- Ordination: 1833 (deacon); 1884 (priest)
- Consecration: 25 July 1911

Personal details
- Born: Charles Fane de Salis; 18/19 March 1860 Fringford, Oxfordshire, UK
- Died: 24 January 1942 (aged 81)
- Denomination: Anglican
- Parents: Henry de Salis & Minnie Henley
- Spouse: Lady Mary Parker
- Children: 2 daughters, 1 son
- Education: Exeter College, Oxford

Charles Fane de Salis (18/19 March 1860 – 24 January 1942) was Bishop of Taunton from 1911 to 1930.

== Early life ==
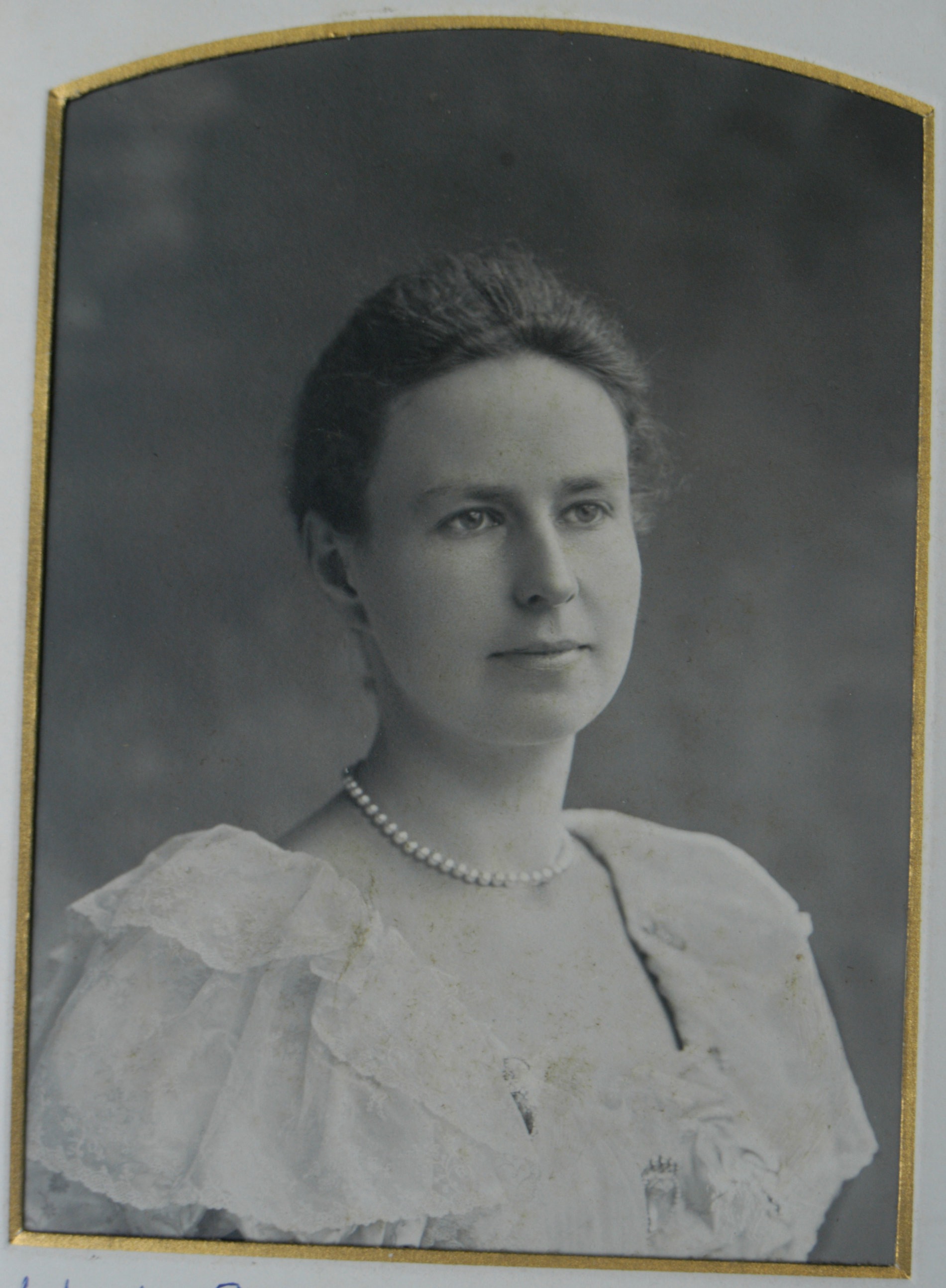
Lady Mary de Salis, c. 1896

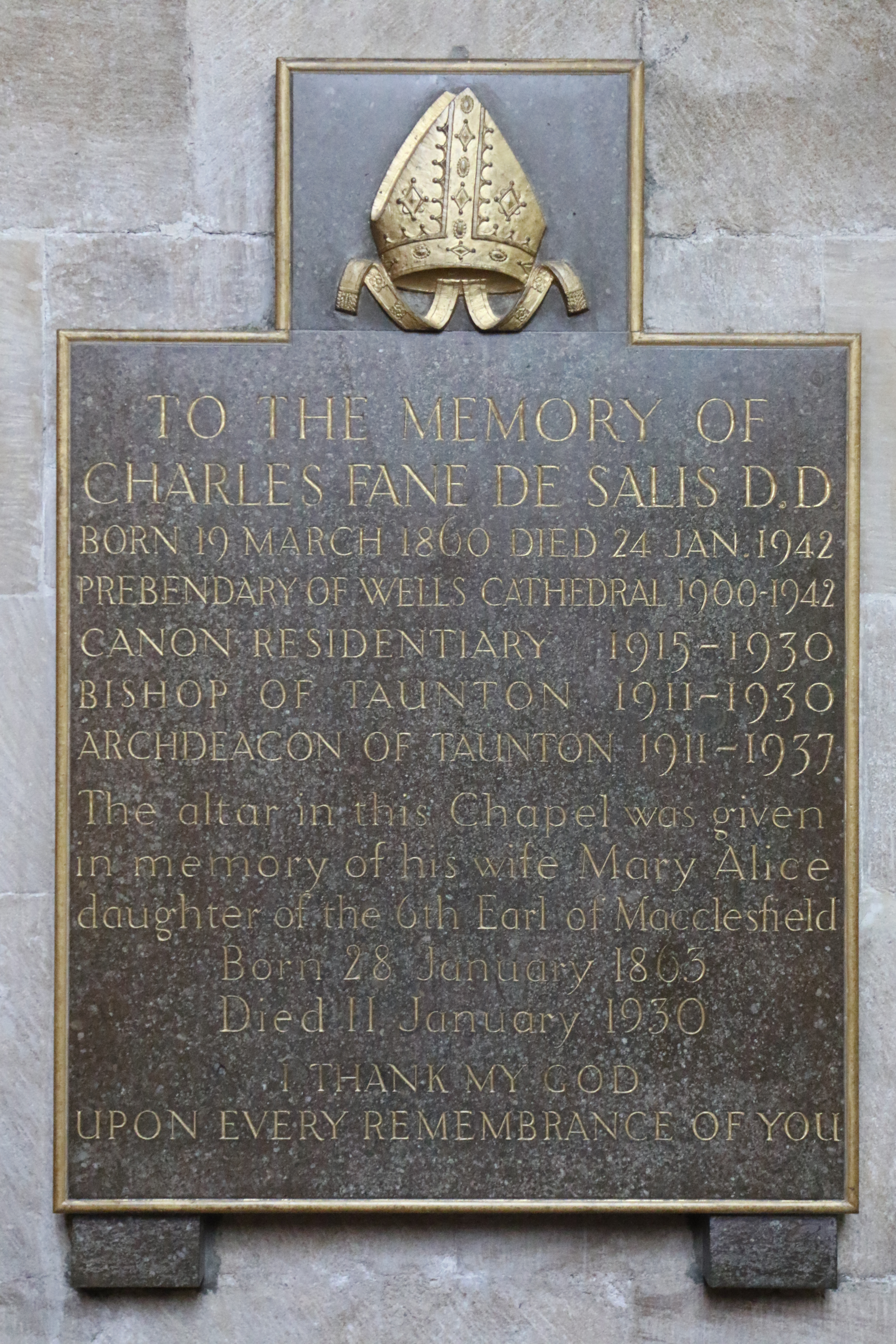
Memorial in Wells Cathedral

Born in Fringford, Oxfordshire, on 18 or 19 March 1860 into an occasionally clerical family, he was educated at Eton and Exeter College, Oxford (MA, DD).

== Ministry ==
Made deacon in 1883 and ordained priest in 1884, he was Curate at St. Michael's, Coventry (until 1888), Vicar of Milverton (1888–1896), then East Brent (1896–99, succeeding his uncle George Denision) and then Rector of Weston-super-Mare. In 1911, he became Archdeacon of Taunton (by his collation on 18 May) and Bishop suffragan of Taunton immediately before his consecration as a bishop on St James's Day (25 July), by Randall Davidson, Archbishop of Canterbury, at St Paul's Cathedral. He additionally became a canon residentiary of Wells Cathedral in 1915, resigned his see and canonry in 1930, and became an assistant bishop of Bath and Wells in 1931. He retired as archdeacon in 1938.

He died on 24 January 1942 and is commemorated in a memorial on the west wall of Wells Cathedral.

== Marriage and family ==
De Salis married his third cousin, on 21 July 1896, Lady Mary Alice (28 June 1863 – 11 January 1930, daughter of Thomas Parker, 6th Earl of Macclesfield). They had two daughters and a son.

Church of England titles
Vacant Title last held by William Finch	Bishop of Taunton; 1911–1930	Succeeded by George Hollis
