= Will Stewart (bishop) =

English bishop (1943–1998)

- Bishop of Taunton
- Diocese: Diocese of Bath and Wells
- Predecessor: Richard Lewis
- Successor: Andy Radford

Orders
- Ordination: 1968 (deacon); 1969 (priest)
- Consecration: June 1997

Personal details
- Born: 19 September 1943
- Died: 24 March 1998 (aged 54)
- Denomination: Anglican
- Parents: William & Betty Stewart
- Spouse: Janet Andrews (m. 1969)
- Children: 2 sons; 2 daughters
- Education: Trinity College, Cambridge

William Allen Stewart (called Will; 19 September 1943 – 24 March 1998) was a Bishop of Taunton whose brief tenure from June 1997 until his death March 1998 was one of the shortest in the Anglican Communion. He was also, at 6 feet 7 inches, one of its tallest.

Stewart was educated at Uppingham and Trinity College, Cambridge (where he gained a Cambridge Master of Arts {MA Cantab}). Made a deacon at Michaelmas 1968 (29 September) and ordained a priest the Michaelmas following (28 September 1969), both times by John Taylor, Bishop of Sheffield, at Sheffield Cathedral; he was a curate at Ecclesall then Cheltenham. Following this he was Vicar of St James, Gloucester then Rector of St Mary Magdalene, Torquay. A sideways move to St Mark, Oulton Broad led to promotion to be Rural Dean of Lothingland and finally, before his appointment to the episcopate, a Canon of Norwich Cathedral.

Church of England titles
Preceded by Nigel McCulloch	Bishop of Taunton; 1997–1998	Succeeded by Andy Radford
