= Bishop of Dudley =

Title in the Anglican Church of England

The Bishop of Dudley is an episcopal title used by a suffragan bishop of the Church of England Diocese of Worcester, in the Province of Canterbury, England. The title takes its name after the town of Dudley in the West Midlands; the See was erected under the Suffragans Nomination Act 1888 by Order in Council dated 24 October 1973. From 1 October 1993 until 2002, the bishop was an area bishop for the diocese's Black Country parishes.

== List of bishops ==
Bishops of Dudley
From	Until	Incumbent	Notes
1974	1977	Michael Mann	
1977	1993	Tony Dumper	First area bishop from 1993.
1993	2000	Rupert Hoare	
2000	2013	David Walker	Last area bishop until 2002; translated to Manchester.
2014	2019	Graham Usher	Translated to Norwich, 17 June 2019.
28 January 2020	present	Martin Gorick	
