= David Walker (bishop of Manchester) =

British Anglican bishop and Lord Spiritual (born 1957)

The Right Reverend Dr David Walker TSSF
- Bishop of Manchester
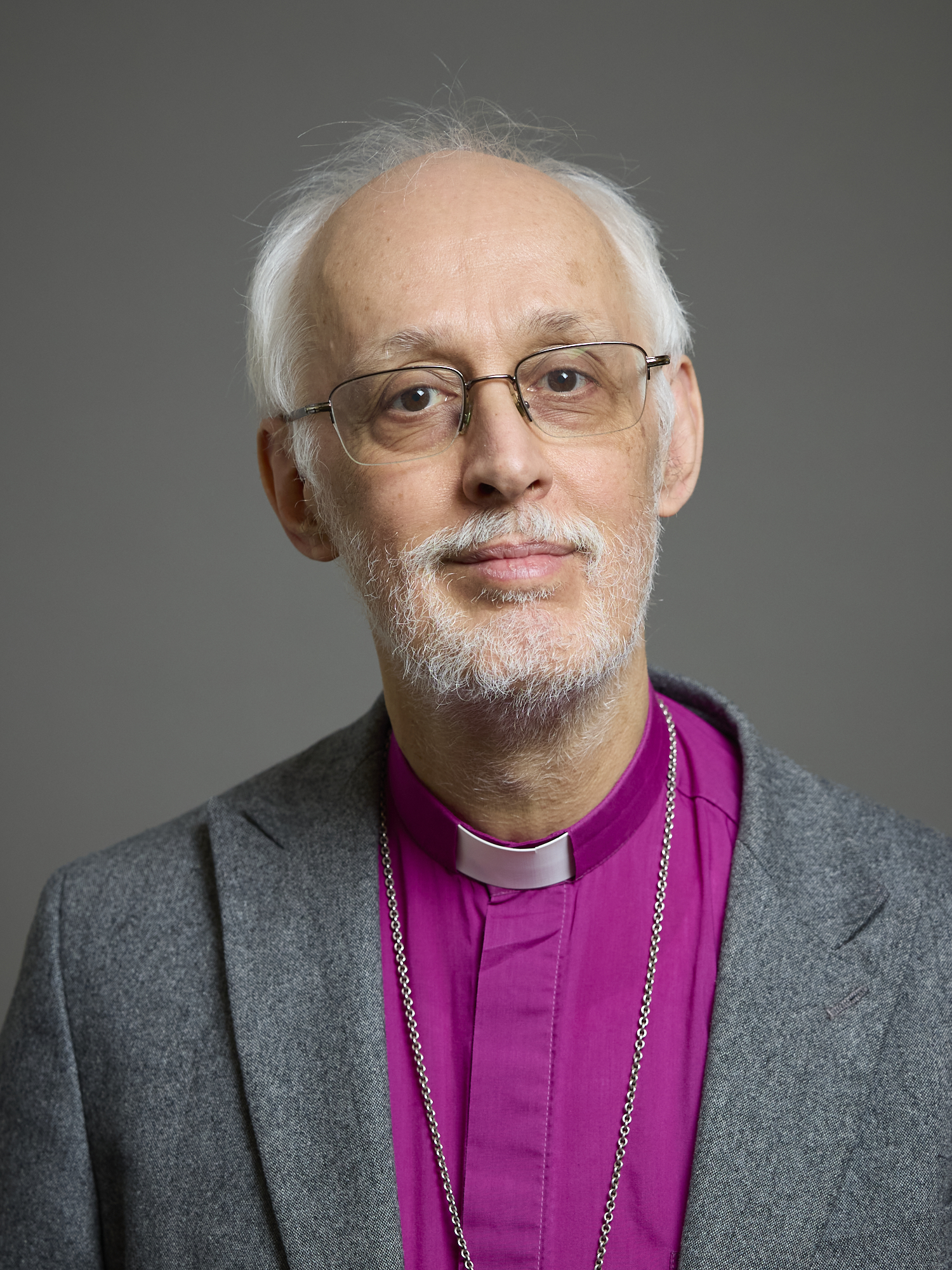
- Official portrait, 2025
- Church: Church of England
- Diocese: Diocese of Manchester
- In office: 2013–present
- Predecessor: Nigel McCulloch
- Previous post: Bishop of Dudley (2000–2013; area bishop until 2002)

Orders
- Ordination: 1983 (deacon); 1984 (priest) by David Lunn
- Consecration: 2000 by George Carey

Personal details
- Born: 30 May 1957 (age 69)
- Denomination: Anglican
- Residence: Bishopscourt, Broughton
- Spouse: Susan (m. 1980)
- Children: two
- Education: King's College, Cambridge

Convenor of the Lords Spiritual
- Incumbent
- Assumed office 1 June 2025
- Preceded by: Alan Smith

Member of the House of Lords
- Lord Spiritual
- Bishop of Manchester; 7 September 2020

David Stuart Walker TSSF (born 30 May 1957) is a British Anglican bishop. Since 2013, he has been the Bishop of Manchester. He had previously been the Bishop of Dudley, a suffragan bishop in the Diocese of Worcester, from 2000 to 2013.

== Early life ==
Walker was born on 30 May 1957. He was educated at The Manchester Grammar School, then an all-boys direct grant grammar school in Manchester. He competed in the International Mathematical Olympiad in 1975. Walker studied at King's College, Cambridge, graduating with a Bachelor of Arts (BA) degree: as per tradition, his BA was promoted to a Master of Arts (MA Cantab) degree. He trained for ministry at Queen's College, Edgbaston, an ecumenical theological college. He later studied for a Doctor of Philosophy (PhD) degree at Warwick University, which he completed in 2015.

== Ordained ministry ==
Walker was ordained in the Church of England: made a deacon at Petertide 1983 (3 July) and ordained a priest the Petertide following (1 July 1984), both times by David Lunn, Bishop of Sheffield, at Sheffield Cathedral. Walker's ordained ministry began as a curate at St Mary Handsworth, after which he was a team vicar at Maltby, then Bramley before ordination to the episcopate.

Walker was consecrated as a bishop on 30 November 2000 by George Carey, Archbishop of Canterbury, at St Paul's Cathedral. During his time as Bishop of Dudley, Walker was Acting Bishop of Worcester (as the sole suffragan of the diocese) during the 2007 interregnum between the retirement of Peter Selby and confirmation of John Inge.

Walker's nomination to be the next Bishop of Manchester was announced on 5 June 2013; his canonical election to the see was confirmed on 7 October 2013; and he was enthroned at Manchester Cathedral on 30 November 2013. Walker was awarded a doctorate in 2014 after research, at Warwick University, on how people belong to their churches, particularly in rural Anglicanism.

Since 2014, Walker has been vice-president of Affirming Catholicism. He is a member of the Third Order of the Society of St Francis (TSSF).

Walker was introduced into the House of Lords on 7 September 2020. He was additionally appointed Convenor of the Lords Spiritual in 2025, and has served since 1 June 2025.

=== Views ===
Walker supports the introduction of same-sex marriage in the Church of England: "I would be delighted to serve as bishop in a church that fully celebrated the committed, exclusive and faithful love of two adults, regardless of whether they were of same or different sexes".

In November 2023, he was one of 44 Church of England bishops who signed an open letter supporting the use of the Prayers of Love and Faith (i.e. blessings for same-sex couples) and called for "Guidance being issued without delay that includes the removal of all restrictions on clergy entering same-sex civil marriages, and on bishops ordaining and licensing such clergy".

== Personal life ==
Walker is a keen hill walker. He married Susan in 1980 and together they have two children; he ordained her deacon at Manchester Cathedral on 1 July 2018, to serve as assistant curate in Prestwich.

== Styles ==
- The Reverend David Walker (1983–2000)
- The Right Reverend David Walker (2000–2014)
- The Right Reverend Doctor David Walker (2014–present)

== See also ==
- Bishop of Manchester

Church of England titles
Preceded by Rupert Hoare	Bishop of Dudley; 2000–2013	Succeeded by Graham Usher
Preceded by Nigel McCulloch	Bishop of Manchester; 2013–present	Incumbent
Professional and academic associations
Preceded by Dr John Rigby	President of the Manchester Statistical Society; 2017–19	Succeeded by Dr Fred Wheeler
