= Maurice Wood =

English bishop

The Right Reverend Maurice Wood DSC
- Bishop of Norwich
- Church: Church of England
- Diocese: Diocese of Norwich
- In office: 1971 to 1985
- Predecessor: Launcelot Fleming
- Successor: Peter Nott
- Other post: Principal of Oak Hill Theological College (1961–1971)

Orders
- Ordination: 1940 (deacon); 1941 (priest)
- Consecration: 1971

Personal details
- Born: Maurice Arthur Ponsonby Wood; 26 August 1916
- Died: 24 June 2007 (aged 90)
- Denomination: Anglicanism
- Education: Monkton Combe School
- Alma mater: Queens' College, Cambridge; Ridley Hall, Cambridge

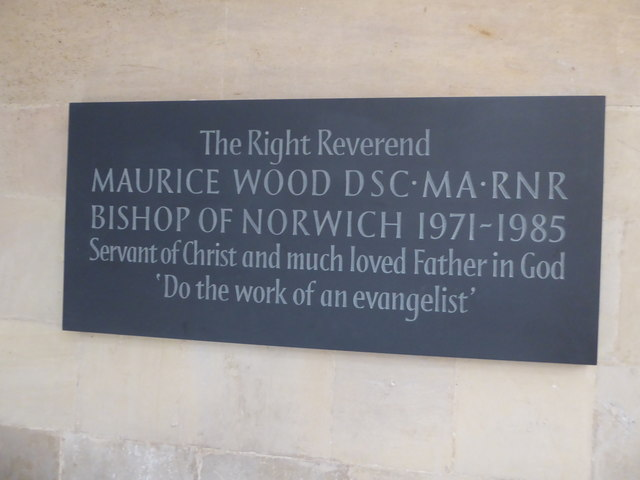
Memorial, Norwich Cathedral

Maurice Arthur Ponsonby Wood, DSC (26 August 1916 – 24 June 2007) was an Anglican bishop in the Evangelical tradition. He was a Royal Navy commando chaplain in World War II and later the Bishop of Norwich.

== Early life and education ==
Wood was born into a teetotal Evangelical family and was educated at Monkton Combe School, Bath, Queens' College, Cambridge and Ridley Hall, Cambridge.

== Family ==
Maurice Wood was married twice. He had three children, Andrew, Patrick and Charity with his first wife, Marjorie and three children, John, Jane and Daniel, with his second wife, Margaret.

== Career ==
During World War II, Wood landed with his Royal Marine unit on the Normandy beaches on D-Day. He officiated at the first service on liberated French soil, aided by the portable organ he had insisted on bringing ashore. He was awarded the Distinguished Service Cross. He was a very popular and distinguished chaplain of No. 48 (Royal Marines) Commando. He joined them after D-Day and landed with them by swimming ashore during their invasion of Walcheren island on 1 November. As in France after D-day, Wood organised a thanksgiving service at Walcheren. It may have been held in Zoutelande Church where Wood and a Dutch pastor chose hymns which could be sung in both Dutch and English.

After the war, Wood worked in the parishes of St Ebbe's, Oxford (1947–1952) and St Mary's, Islington (1952–1961) both known for their strong Evangelical traditions. He then became Principal of Oak Hill Theological College in Southgate, London. In 1971 he was appointed as the 69th Bishop of Norwich, serving in this post for 14 years before retiring in 1985. He espoused conventional Evangelical views – for example on women's ordination - and supported Mary Whitehouse in her campaigns. He was innovative – for example he bought a fleet of 36 mopeds to enable his clergy to get around their parishes – and he was a media-friendly communicator. As a supporter of Evangelism, Wood helped to organise Billy Graham's UK crusades. He was also a regular speaker at the annual Keswick Convention, serving on its council for many years. He was the first Bishop of Norwich to pay a formal visit to the Church of England's Shrine of Our Lady of Walsingham. His contradictory nature surfaced after his consecration as a bishop when he would happily wear a golden cope and was reputed to take a case of episcopal jewelled rings to functions, but he would not wear a mitre, although he occasionally permitted a mitre to be carried on a cushion before him in processions. Diocesan clergy learned of his abstinence from alcohol when only fruit juice was offered; waggishly, his crypto-Latin title as Maurice Norvic was parodied as Maurice Britvic.

== Honours and awards ==
- 14 November 1944 – Distinguished Service Cross – For gallantry, skill, determination and undaunted devotion to duty during the landing of Allied Forces on the coast of Normandy The Reverend Maurice Arthur Ponsonby Wood, Temporary Chaplain, R.N.V.R. (Bromley).

== Sources ==
- EDP24 obituary, 26 June 2007
- Obituary, The Daily Telegraph, 27 June 2007
- Obituary, The Independent, 28 June 2007
- Obituary, The Times, 28 June 2007
- Obituary, The Guardian, 16 July 2007

Church of England titles
Preceded by William Lancelot Scott Fleming	Bishop of Norwich; 1971–1985	Succeeded by Peter John Nott
