= Derrick Walters =

Rhys Derrick Chamberlain Walters OBE (1932–2000) was an Anglican priest in Britain. He served as the fourth Dean of Liverpool from 1983 to 1999 during which time he extended the facilities of the cathedral and promoted the creation of a large public housing development next to it.

== Biography ==
Rhys Derrick Chamberlain Walters was born in Britain on 10 March 1932, the son of a shop steward. He was educated at Gowerton Boys’ Grammar School in the county of Swansea, and afterwards at the London School of Economics. In 1957 he undertook training for the Anglican priesthood at Ripon Hall, Oxford.

He was ordained in 1958 and began his ecclesiastical career with a curacy at St Michael's church, Manselton, Swansea. Later he became the Anglican Chaplain at Swansea University and Curate at St Mary's church, Swansea.

In 1962 he became parish priest in industrial areas - firstly at All Saints, Totley and secondly at St Mary's, Boulton by Derby.

From 1974 he was diocesan missioner for the Diocese of Salisbury, where he spent the next nine years serving the Christian mission in country parishes. During this time he developed an interest in information technology.

In 1983 he was appointed to the Deanery of Liverpool cathedral, where David Sheppard was already bishop (1975-1997). Here, with the support of his wife, Joan (née Joan Trollope Fisher,) and in co-operation with his bishop, he improved the liturgy and music, extended the cathedral's facilities (creating a refectory and conference venue) and developed adjacent land by helping to commission public housing as well as housing for students and cathedral staff and building the Queen's Walk and the Liverpool John Moores University media studies block.

In 1994 he was appointed an OBE. In his last years he was ill with cancer and retired from his post in 1999. He died on 5 April 2000. He was survived by his wife, Joan, and his sons, David Rhys Walters and Michael Rhys Walters. A building is named after him at Liverpool John Moores University.

Walters was grandfather of the entertainment entrepreneur William Walters.

== Notes ==
Religious titles
| Preceded by Edward Henry Patey | Dean of Liverpool; 1983–1999 | Succeeded by Rupert William Noel Hoare |
