= Rupert Hoare =

The Rt Revd Rupert Hoare PhD MA(Cantab)
- Dean of Liverpool
- Church: Liverpool Cathedral
- In office: 1999–2007 (retired)
- Predecessor: Derrick Walters
- Successor: Justin Welby
- Previous posts: Honorary assistant bishop in Manchester (2007–present); Area Bishop of Dudley (1993–1999)

Orders
- Ordination: 1964 (deacon); 1965 (priest)
- Consecration: 1993

Personal details
- Born: 3 March 1940 (age 86) Sussex, United Kingdom
- Children: 3 sons; 1 daughter
- Profession: Academic (theologian)
- Education: Trinity College, Oxford

Rupert William Noel Hoare (born 3 March 1940) is a former dean of Liverpool and Anglican area Bishop of Dudley.

== Biography ==
Hoare was born on 3 March 1940 in Sussex, England. He attended the Dragon School in Oxford before attending Rugby School. Upon completing his secondary education, he went to Trinity College, Oxford where he studied theology.

He graduated in 1961 with a First Class Honours and spend the following year in Berlin on a scholarship from Coventry Cathedral. In 1963, he returned to Cambridge, this time attending Westcott House Theological College. In 1964, he achieved another First Class Honours in Part III of the Cambridge Tripos and completed his PhD thesis on the relationship between theology and psychiatry in 1973.

He became a deacon in 1964, and became a curate at St Mary's Oldham in the Diocese of Manchester in 1965. In 1968, he took up a post at Queen's College, Birmingham where he lectured for five years. He also became an Honorary Canon Theologian at Coventry Cathedral, holding this post for six years. In 1972, he returned to Manchester as rector of the Parish of the Resurrection.

In 1978, he returned to Birmingham as a canon residentiary of St. Philip's Cathedral, Birmingham, before being appointed principal of Westcott House in 1981. He was area Bishop of Dudley in the Diocese of Worcester between 1993 and 2000 before moving to become the dean of Liverpool in 1999. He retired in 2007.

== Styles ==
- Rupert Hoare (1940–1965)
- The Revd Rupert Hoare (1965–1968)
- The Revd Canon Rupert Hoare (1968–1973)
- The Revd Canon Dr Rupert Hoare (1973–1993)
- The Rt Revd Dr Rupert Hoare (1993–present)

Although Hoare became dean of Liverpool, which would usually carry with it the style of the Very Revd, he was already a bishop and thus kept the style title of the Rt Revd. Therefore, he was known as the Rt Revd Rupert Hoare, Dean of Liverpool; not the Very Revd Rupert Hoare.

Religious titles
Preceded by Tony Dumper	Bishop of Dudley; 1993–1999	Succeeded by David Walker
Preceded by Derrick Walters	Dean of Liverpool; 1999–2007	Succeeded by Justin Welby
