= Peter Maurice (bishop) =

British Anglican bishop

The Right Reverend Peter Maurice
- Bishop of Taunton
- Church: Church of England
- Diocese: Diocese of Bath and Wells
- In office: 2006 – 30 April 2015 (retired)
- Predecessor: Andy Radford
- Successor: Ruth Worsley
- Other post: Archdeacon of Wells (2003–2006)

Orders
- Ordination: 1975 (deacon); 1976 (priest)
- Consecration: 7 December 2006

Personal details
- Born: 14 April 1951 (age 75)
- Denomination: Anglican
- Spouse: Elizabeth
- Children: 2 sons & 1 daughter
- Education: St Chad's College, Durham; College of the Resurrection

Peter David Maurice (born 14 April 1951) is a retired Anglican bishop. He was the Bishop of Taunton until 30 April 2015.

== Early life and education ==
Maurice was born on 16 April 1951, to Eric and Pamela Maurice. He studied at St Chad's College, Durham, graduating with a Bachelor of Arts (BA) degree in 1972. He trained for Holy Orders at the College of the Resurrection, Mirfield.

== Ordained ministry ==
Maurice was ordained in the Church of England as a deacon in 1975 and as a priest in 1976. He was a curate at St Paul's Wandsworth, then team vicar at Mortlake with East Sheen, then of Holy Trinity Church, Rotherhithe, Rural Dean of Bermondsey, vicar of All Saints', Tooting and finally, before his ordination to the episcopate, the Archdeacon of Wells.

In October 2006, Maurice was announced as the next Bishop of Taunton, a suffragan bishop in the Diocese of Bath and Wells. He was consecrated a bishop on 7 December 2006. He retired from full-time ministry on 30 April 2015.

In retirement, Maurice holds Permission to Officiate in the Diocese of Canterbury.

=== Views ===
On 11 February 2017, fourteen retired bishops signed an open letter to the then-serving bishops of the Church of England. In an unprecedented move, they expressed their opposition to the House of Bishops' report to General Synod on sexuality, which recommended no change to the Church's canons or practises around sexuality. By 13 February, a serving bishop (Alan Wilson, Bishop of Buckingham) and nine further retired bishops—including Maurice—had added their signatures; on 15 February, the report was rejected by synod.

== Personal life ==
Maurice is a sports fan. He is married to Elizabeth, with two sons and one daughter.

== Styles ==
- The Reverend Peter Maurice (1975–2003)
- The Venerable Peter Maurice (2003–2006)
- The Right Reverend Peter Maurice (2006–present)

Church of England titles
Preceded by Richard Acworth	Archdeacon of Wells; 2003–2006	Succeeded by Nicola Sullivan
Preceded by Andy Radford	Bishop of Taunton; 2006–2015	Succeeded by Ruth Worsley
