= Edward Patey =

Edward Henry Patey (12 August 1915 – 5 September 2005) was the Church of England Dean of Liverpool, England from 1964 to 1982.

Patey was born in Bristol and educated at Marlborough College, Hertford College, Oxford and Westcott House, Cambridge. His great great grandfather was Bishop Charles Blomfield. He was ordained in 1939 and in 1942 he became the Youth Chaplain to the Bishop of Durham. He served as a priest at St Anne's Oldland Common near Bristol. In 1958, he became Canon of Coventry, where he obtained experience in the building of the new Coventry Cathedral. He became Dean of Liverpool in 1964, at a time when the Gothic Anglican Liverpool Cathedral remained unfinished 60 years after the foundation stone had been laid; and retired in 1982.
Landmarks of his tenure as Dean included the dedication of the cathedral by Elizabeth II in October 1978 (despite some final details still remaining uncompleted), a memorial service for John Lennon in 1981, and a controversial visit from Pope John Paul II in 1982. An honorary Doctor of the University of Liverpool, he was succeeded as dean by the Rev Derrick Walters.
He married his wife, Margaret, in 1942. She was appointed OBE for her community work. Together, they had three daughters and one son.

== Notes ==
Religious titles
Preceded by Frederick William Dillistone	Dean of Liverpool; 1964–1982	Succeeded by Rhys Derrick Chamberlain Walters
