= Clifford Martin =

English Anglican bishop

Clifford Martin in 1957

Clifford Arthur Martin (11 November 1895 – 11 August 1977) was an Anglican bishop. He was the fourth Bishop of Liverpool, serving from 1944 to 1965.

After service in the army in the First World War, Martin became a priest, serving in parishes in the south of England. He hoped to undertake missionary work, but his health was not good enough. In 1944 he was appointed to the diocese of Liverpool at a time when relations between the cathedral and the community were strained. He rebuilt relations with the parishes of the diocese and oversaw a programme of building to repair churches damaged by wartime bombing and provide new churches for new housing developments.

== Life and career ==
=== Early years ===
Martin was born in London, the son of Arthur Martin. The family was not well off, and could not afford to send Martin to a university. At the age of 19 he enlisted in the army as a private soldier on the outbreak of the First World War, and rose through the ranks to become a commissioned officer in the Royal Sussex Regiment. He had begun 1915 as a Private and ended it as a commissioned officer. He was in France 1916-17 but had to return to England because of sickness. On his recovery, he was undertaking bayonet training in Tunbridge Wells in October, 1917, when he slipped and fell on the end of a scabbard which penetrated an eye and left him blind in that eye for life. He was transferred to the Instruction School at Berkhamsted, before leaving the army. Ironically, when he retired in 1965, the Church Times would describe him as one of the more photogenic bishops.

After the war Martin, as an ex-serviceman, qualified for and took up a place on a degree course in theology at Fitzwilliam College, Cambridge, also studying at Ridley Hall theological college, an evangelical institution of the Church of England. He was ordained priest in 1920, and was appointed curate of Christ Church, Croydon. After four years he left to take up the post of secretary to the Young People's department of the Church Missionary Society. He hoped to undertake missionary work overseas, but his application to do so was rejected on health grounds.

In 1926, Martin married Margaret La Trobe née Foster, daughter of the Rev Frederick La Trobe Foster. There were one son and three daughters of the marriage. The following year he returned to Christ Church, Croydon as vicar, serving there until 1933. He was then successively vicar of Christ Church, Folkestone (1933–39) and St Andrew's, Plymouth (1939–44). While at Plymouth he was appointed chaplain to the king. In a German air raid his church was gutted and his vicarage badly damaged, but, in the words of the historian Peter Kennerley, "his care for his people never faltered … his extraordinary pastoral skills were revealed."

=== Liverpool ===
Martin's gifts as a pastor was the main reason why he was chosen to succeed Albert David as Bishop of Liverpool when David retired in 1944. More senior clergy including an overseas bishop and four serving diocesan bishops in sees in England were considered for the post but Martin, who was an Evangelical and had gained fame when his parish church in Plymouth was destroyed and he had turned the site into a garden, was selected. Martin was not, as was customary for a bishop, an academic; his appeal rested on the strength of his pastoral work. His appointment was a surprise. He was consecrated a bishop on St James's Day 1944 (25 July), by Cyril Garbett, Archbishop of York, at York Minster. Kennerley writes that David, a scholar and former schoolmaster, was more respected than loved in the diocese. With Martin's arrival there came "a great improvement in the relationship between Cathedral and diocese."

Liverpool suffered heavy bombing during the Second World War, and many churches were lost. Martin initiated the rebuilding work, and ensured that new housing estates were provided with churches and halls. As a pastor he maintained close contact with all the parishes of his diocese. It was his practice to spend weekends in parishes, preaching, baptising, confirming and visiting the sick. In the view of The Times he made the cathedral "the mother church of the diocese in fact as well as in theory".

Martin retained his youthful interest in overseas missionary work, and he was pleased when his eldest daughter succeeded where he had failed in being accepted for service with the Church Missionary Society. He was chairman of the overseas council of the Church Assembly, and visited Africa on several occasions.

In 1965, the year in which he turned 70, Martin resigned the see of Liverpool. In the same year he was appointed an honorary fellow of St Peter's College, Oxford. He retired to Middle Littleton, near Evesham, and died at the age of 81.

== Notes ==
Church of England titles
Preceded by Albert David	Bishop of Liverpool; 1944–1965	Succeeded by Stuart Blanch
