= Graham Usher (bishop) =

British Anglican bishop and Lord Spiritual (born 1970)

The Right Reverend Graham Usher
- Bishop of Norwich
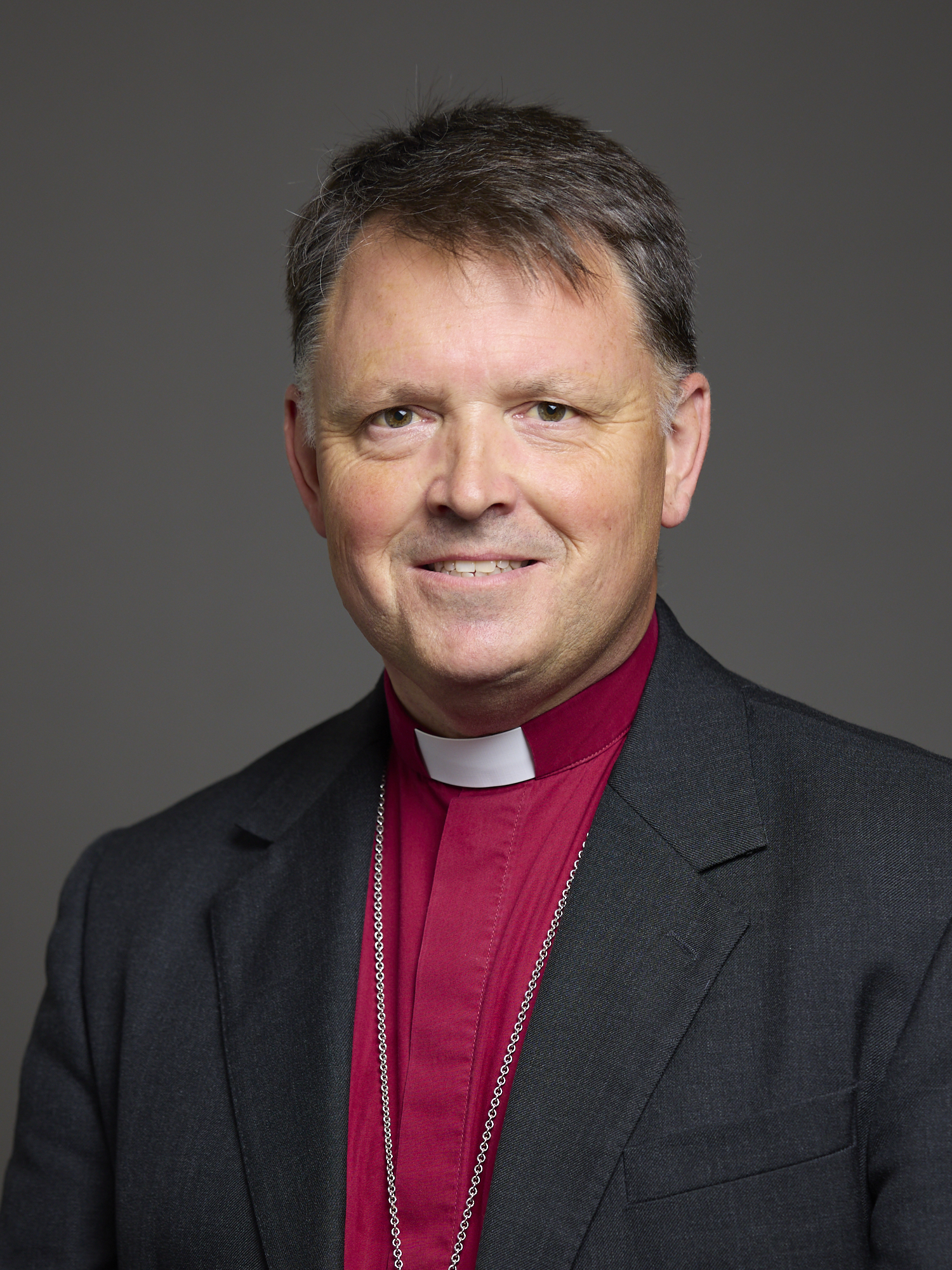
- Official portrait, 2024
- Church: Church of England
- Diocese: Diocese of Norwich
- In office: 17 June 2019 – present
- Predecessor: Graham James
- Other post: Lord High Almoner (2024–present)
- Previous post: Bishop of Dudley (2014–2019)

Orders
- Ordination: 1996 (deacon); 1997 (priest)
- Consecration: 25 March 2014 by Justin Welby

Personal details
- Born: Graham Barham Usher; 11 September 1970 (age 56)
- Denomination: Anglicanism
- Spouse: Rachel Thomson
- Children: 2
- Education: Pocklington School
- Alma mater: University of Edinburgh; Corpus Christi College, Cambridge

Member of the House of Lords
- Lord Spiritual
- Bishop of Norwich; 26 October 2023

Graham Barham Usher (born 11 September 1970) is an Anglican bishop and ecologist. Since 2019, he has been the Bishop of Norwich; he had previously served as Bishop of Dudley, a suffragan bishop in the Diocese of Worcester.

== Early life ==
Usher was born on 11 September 1970. He was baptised by Douglas Sargent, the then Bishop of Selby. He spent the very first years of his life living in Ghana. Between 1981 and 1989, he was educated at Pocklington School, a private school in Pocklington, Yorkshire. He studied ecological science at the University of Edinburgh, graduating with a Bachelor of Science (BSc) degree in 1993. He then attended the University of Cambridge where he studied theology at Corpus Christi College, Cambridge. He graduated with a Bachelor of Arts (BA) degree in 1995; this degree was later promoted to Master of Arts (MA Cantab), as per tradition. Following the completion of his theology studies, he trained for the priesthood at Westcott House, Cambridge, and St. Nicholas Theological Seminary in Ghana.

== Ordained ministry ==
Usher was ordained in the Church of England as a deacon in 1996 and as a priest in 1997. He was then a curate at St Mary the Virgin, Nunthorpe, Middlesbrough, from 1996 to 1999. While serving his curacy, he also worked with young offenders as a chaplain at HM Prison Northallerton. He was Vicar of North Ormesby, Middlesbrough between 1999 and 2004. The area has deep social and economic needs and is in the top two percent of deprived areas in England.

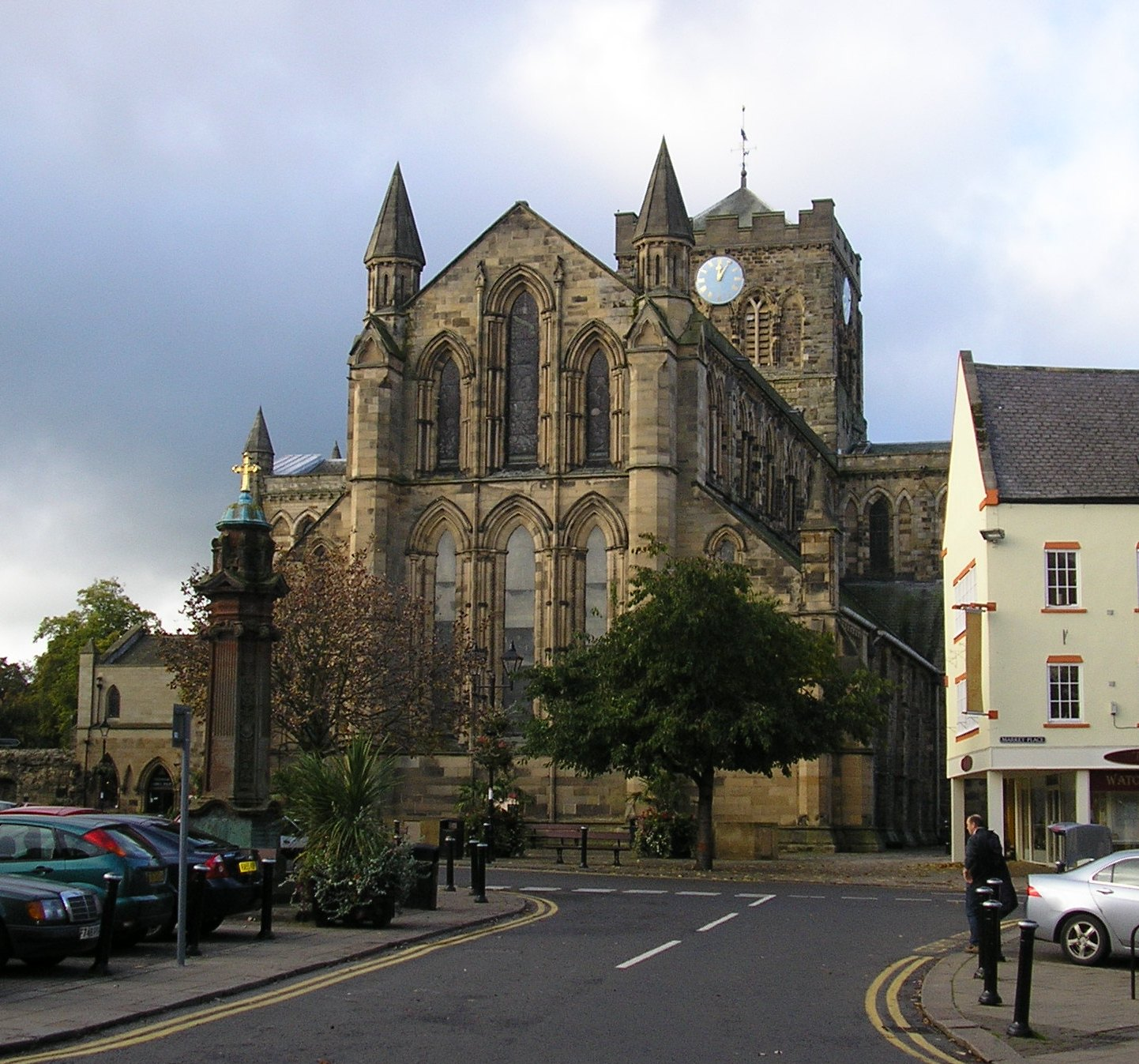
East end of Hexham Abbey

He was rector and lecturer at Hexham Abbey from 2004 to 2014. Hexham Abbey is a large parish church that can be described as cathedral-like. During his time as rector, the congregation grew and he supported the setting up of a food bank covering West Northumberland. He also reunited the abbey with its monastic buildings, the buildings having been separated during the Reformation, raising £3.2M to refurbish some buildings and build others, including a new cloister and refectory, and new conference and meeting rooms, also a state of the art exhibition about the Abbey's history. He was additionally Area Dean of Hexham from 2006 to 2011. He was appointed an Honorary Canon of Kumasi in Ghana, the place of his early childhood, in 2007.

=== Episcopal ministry ===
On 12 December 2013, it was announced that he was to become the next Bishop of Dudley, a suffragan bishop in the Diocese of Worcester. He was consecrated on 25 March 2014 by Archbishop Justin Welby at St Paul's Cathedral, London. He was 43 at his appointment, making him one of the youngest of the current Church of England bishops and the first to have been born in the 1970s.

From 2017 to 2023 he was a member of the International Commission for Anglican Orthodox Theological Dialogue contributing to agreed statements about the environment, euthanasia and organ transplantation.

On 3 May 2019, Usher was announced as the next Bishop of Norwich, the diocesan bishop of the Diocese of Norwich. His election was confirmed on 17 June 2019 at St Mary-le-Bow. He was enthroned as the 72nd Bishop of Norwich in Norwich Cathedral on 9 November 2019 during a very inclusive service which included Down syndrome dancers, children and refugees. Honey cake was served to the 1800 strong congregation made with honey from Usher's own bees.

In 2020 he was appointed as the Church of England's episcopal member of the Anglican Consultative Council and, from 2021, a Church Commissioner. He is a member of the Council of St George's House, Windsor Castle.

In March 2021 the Archbishop of Canterbury announced that Usher would be the Church of England's lead bishop for the environment.

He took part in the 2023 Coronation as one of the two bishop assistants to Queen Camilla.

On 17 October 2023, Usher was admitted to the House of Lords as a Lord Spiritual. He was introduced to the House on 26 October 2023.

Usher was appointed Lord High Almoner by King Charles III in November 2024, an office in the Royal Households of the United Kingdom.

In 2026 Usher was named one of the Edie 100 most impactful sustainability and climate leaders in the UK. Also in 2026 he was awarded an Honorary Doctorate honoris causa by the University of Edinburgh and was President of the Royal Norfolk Show.

=== Views ===
Usher voted in favour of the introduction of blessings for same-sex couples by the Church of England.

In July 2026 the Church of England's General Synod voted to reject a motion to commit to rewilding 30% of church-owned land by 2030, instead backing an alternative amendment from Usher, the lead bishop for the environment. The amendment set out six alternative steps, including continuing to "support nature restoration projects where appropriate" and working with tenant farmers on sustainable practices.

== Other work ==
Having completed an undergraduate degree in ecology, Usher continues to have interest in the field. Between 2008 and 2010, he was a member of the Forestry Commission's Regional Advisory Committee (RAC) for the North East of England. In 2010, he was appointed chairman of the North East RAC. In December 2013, the Regional Advisory Committees changed name to become the Forestry and Woodlands Advisory Committees (FWACs). He continued as chair of the new North East FWAC. He stood down from his role with the Forestry commission following the announcement that he would be joining the episcopate and leaving the North East.

In April 2009, he was appointed a member of the Northumberland National Park Authority by the Secretary of State for Environment, Food and Rural Affairs. In April 2013, he was re-appointed by the Secretary of State to the Northumberland National Park Authority, his previous term having ended, but resigned when he moved from the North East.

In 2012, he contributed an article for the website of the Diocese of Newcastle concerning Ash dieback in the UK. Also in 2012, he published a book titled Places of Enchantment: Meeting God in landscapes. The book concerns the relationship between people, God and the environment; particularly people experiencing God in the natural world, rather than through organised religion such as church services.

In April 2020 he published The Way Under Our Feet: A Spirituality of Walking.

From March 2016 until November 2020 he was a member of the Human Tissue Authority, appointed by the Secretary of State for Health.

== Personal life ==
Usher is married to Rachel Thomson, a general practitioner who was also educated at Pocklington School. Together, they have two children.

Court offices
Preceded by John Inge	Lord High Almoner; 2024–present	Incumbent
Church of England titles
Preceded by David Walker	Bishop of Dudley; 2014–2019	Succeeded by Martin Gorick
Preceded by Graham James	Bishop of Norwich; 2019–present	Incumbent
