= Michael Mann (bishop) =

British Anglican bishop

Michael Ashley Mann
- Born: 25 May 1924
- Died: 31 December 2011 (aged 87)
- Occupation: Anglican bishop

Michael Ashley Mann KCVO (25 May 1924 – 31 December 2011) was an Anglican bishop during the last quarter of the 20th century.

== Early life ==
He was born on 25 May 1924 in Harrow, London, England. He was educated at Harrow School, an all-boys public school in London, where was a member of the shooting team.

Mann attended a wartime short course at the Royal Military College, Sandhurst. Then, 1943 to 1946, he served as an officer in the 1st King's Dragoon Guards, an armoured car regiment of the British Army. He began his active service in North Africa equipped with the Humber Armoured Car. Then, in September 1943, he was involved in the Salerno landings of Operation Avalanche. As a troop leader, he advanced north through Italy to Monte Cassino, where the armoured cars became stuck in the boggy ground and the regiment resorted to mules and even formed an operational horse troop. His troop were then posted to Florence to help the local Italian partisans maintain order in the city, and Mann took over a bar on the Piazza della Repubblica as a base for himself and his troops.

From 1946 to 1955, he served in the Colonial Service in Nigeria.

== Ordained ministry ==
Ordained in 1957 he was later Vicar of Sparkwell, a Canon Residentiary at Norwich Cathedral, Bishop of Dudley and finally Dean of Windsor. He retired in 1989.

== Personal life ==
In 1990, the year after his retirement, his first wife died. In 1991, he married the widow of George Pepys, Bishop of Buckingham from 1964 to 1974.

He died at 87 on 31 December 2011.

Church of England titles
Preceded by Inaugural appointment	Bishop of Dudley; 1974–1976	Succeeded by Anthony Charles Dumper
Preceded by William Launcelot Scott Fleming	Dean of Windsor; 1976–1989	Succeeded by Patrick Reynolds Mitchell
