= Martin Gorick =

British Anglican bishop (born 1962)

The Right Reverend Martin Gorick
- Bishop of Dudley
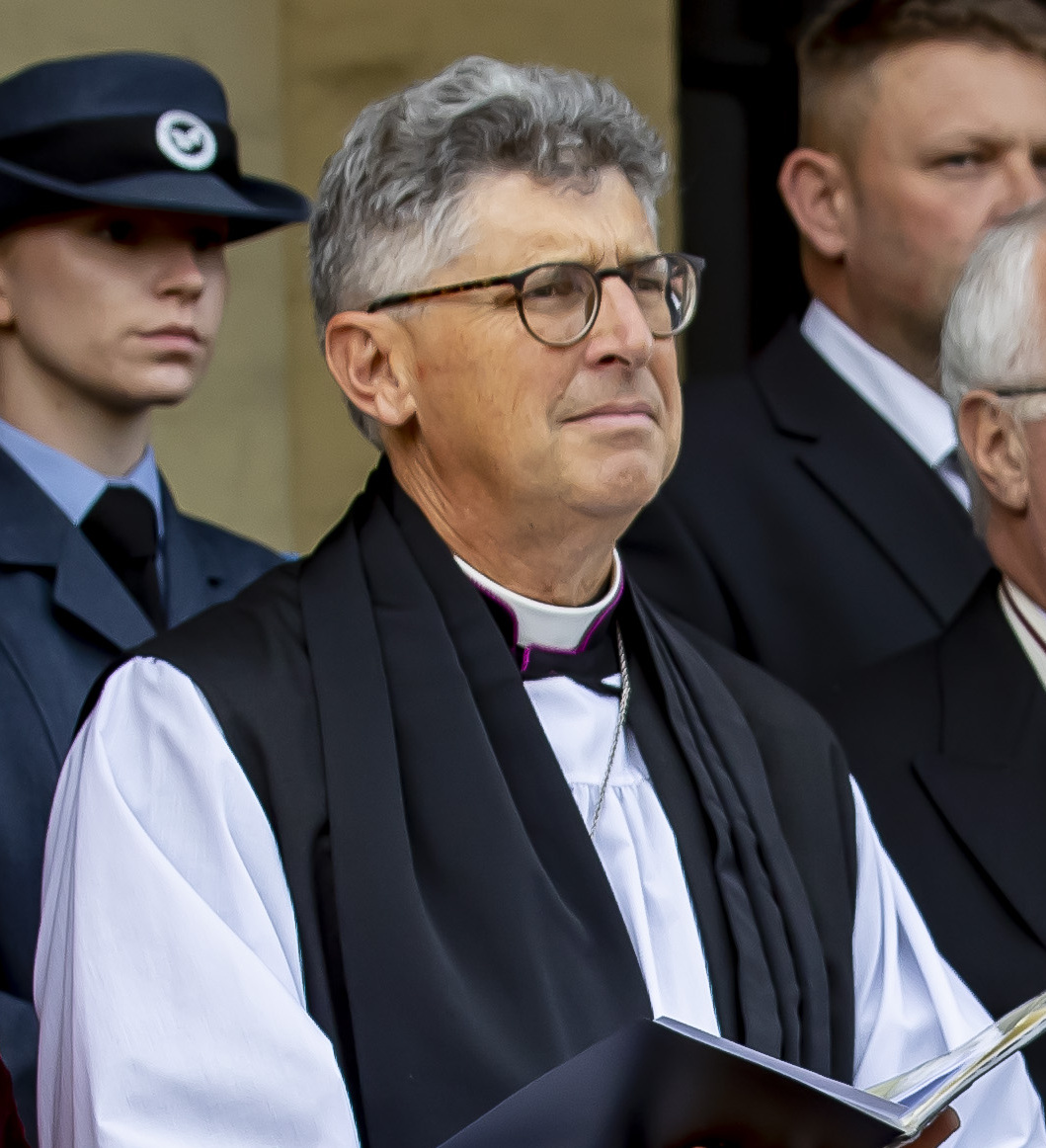
- Gorick in 2022
- Church: Church of England
- Diocese: Diocese of Worcester
- In office: 2020 to present
- Predecessor: Graham Usher
- Previous post: Archdeacon of Oxford (2013–2019)

Orders
- Ordination: 1987 by David Jenkins
- Consecration: 28 January 2020 by Justin Welby

Personal details
- Born: Martin Charles William Gorick; 23 June 1962 (age 64)
- Denomination: Anglicanism
- Education: Selwyn College, Cambridge; Ripon College Cuddesdon

Martin Charles William Gorick (born 23 June 1962) is a British Anglican bishop, who has served since 2020 as Bishop of Dudley, the sole suffragan bishop in the Church of England Diocese of Worcester. He was previously Archdeacon of Oxford in the Diocese of Oxford from 2013.

== Early life and education ==
Gorick was born on 23 June 1962 in Liverpool, England. From 1973 to 1980, he was educated at West Bridgford School, a comprehensive school in West Bridgford, Nottinghamshire. Gorick studied at Selwyn College, Cambridge, from 1981 to 1984, and trained for ordination at Ripon College Cuddesdon 1985 to 1987.

== Ordained ministry ==
Gorick was ordained by David Jenkins, Bishop of Durham in 1987 in Durham Cathedral. He was Curate of Birtley, Tyne and Wear until 1991 when he was appointed Domestic Chaplain to Richard Harries, Bishop of Oxford. He was Vicar of Smethwick from 1994, and Area Dean of Warley; Vicar of the Church of the Holy Trinity, Stratford-upon-Avon from 2001 until his appointment as Archdeacon of Oxford and Canon Residentiary of Christ Church, Oxford in 2013. Gorick was also Diocesan Inter-Faith Adviser, leads on Church Planting and Fresh Expressions and oversees Chaplaincy in the Diocese of Oxford.

=== Episcopal ministry ===
On 4 November 2019, it was announced that Gorick would be the next Bishop of Dudley, the suffragan bishop in the Diocese of Worcester. On 28 January 2020, he was consecrated as a bishop by Justin Welby, Archbishop of Canterbury, during a service at Southwark Cathedral. Gorick was welcomed into the diocese as the Bishop of Dudley on 22 February 2020.

Following John Inge's retirement the same day, Gorick became Acting Bishop of Worcester on 9 October 2024.

=== Views ===
In November 2022, Bishop Martin published a letter alongside his diocesan bishop, John Inge, that stated "the time has come for the Church to celebrate and honour same sex relations" and supported the introduction of same-sex marriage in the Church of England.

In November 2023, he was one of 44 Church of England bishops who signed an open letter supporting the use of the Prayers of Love and Faith (i.e. blessings for same-sex couples) and called for "Guidance being issued without delay that includes the removal of all restrictions on clergy entering same-sex civil marriages, and on bishops ordaining and licensing such clergy".

Martin Gorick is co-chair of the Diocese of Worcester's Racial Justice Forum. In 2024, he appeared in the Fifth Biannual report of the Archbishop's Commission on Racial Justice.

He also has a commitment to gender equality, recording a film for the Diocese of Worcester's celebration of the 30th anniversary of the ordination of women priests reflecting on the experience of his Mother and Godmother.

Martin is a member of the Diocese of Worcester's Climate Crisis Group and has been a vocal supporter on the campaign for sustainable flowers. He championed a motion approved by Diocesan Synod in November 2024 which will be taken to the General Synod.

In November 2024 Martin called for properly funded end of life care as part of the debate around ensuring a dignified death and ahead of the Assisted Dying Bill being debated in Parliament. He highlighted a lack of funding for hospices as a key reason why individuals are not able to have a ‘good’ death and are seeking alternative options.

At the February 2025 meeting of the General Synod of the Church of England, Bishop Martin spoke on the importance of the Cure of Souls remaining central to all that priests do.
