= Tony Dumper =

- Bishop of Dudley
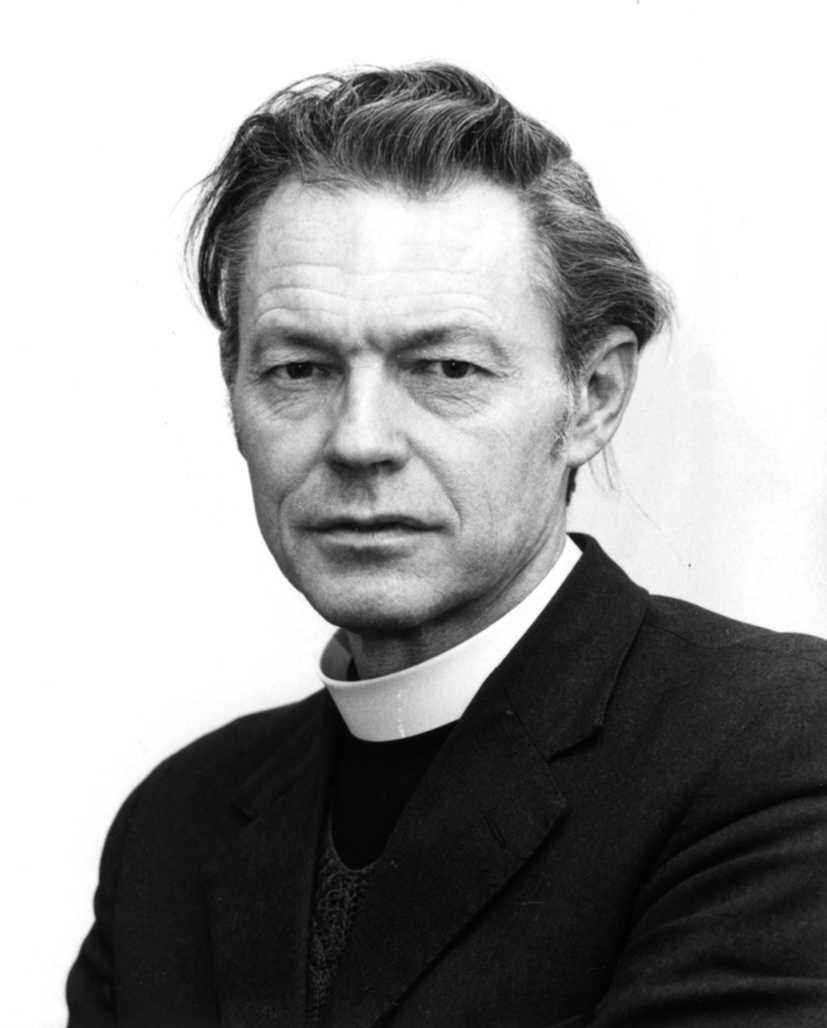
- Diocese: Diocese of Worcester
- In office: 1977–1993
- Predecessor: Michael Mann
- Successor: Rupert Hoare
- Other posts: Area bishop of Dudley (1993); Honorary assistant bishop in Birmingham (from 1993)

Orders
- Ordination: 1947 (deacon); c. 1948 (priest)
- Consecration: 1977

Personal details
- Born: October 4, 1923
- Died: 27 August 2012 (aged 88)
- Denomination: Anglican
- Parents: Charles & Edith
- Spouse: Sibylle Hellwig (m. 1948; d. 2001)
- Children: 2 sons; 1 daughter
- Education: Christ's College, Cambridge

Anthony Charles Dumper (4 October 1923 – 27 August 2012) was the suffragan Bishop of Dudley from 1977 until 1993 and the first area bishop under the Worcester diocese area scheme from 1993. He was an Anglican priest in Malaysia and Singapore from 1949 until 1970, becoming Dean of St Andrews Cathedral, Singapore in 1964.

== Early life and education ==
Tony Dumper was born in Surbiton, Surrey, the son of a bank clerk who gained a MC in the First World War. He grew up in a loving family with a deep commitment to social justice. His paternal grandfather stood as the first Labour candidate for Surbiton in the 1918 general election. His maternal grandfather ran a bakery and was reputed to have given bread to the starving children who came begging. During world War 2, his mother welcomed Jewish refugee children into their home. He attended Surbiton Grammar School before going to Christ's College, Cambridge where he studied history under the notable scholar and pacifist Charles Raven. As a pacifist, he was a conscientious objector during the Second World War, agreeing to work on the land before completing his Masters. While training for ordination at Wescott House, Cambridge, he joined the Salvation Army relief team working in post-war Germany as a youth officer. Soon after his arrival, he met his wife Sybille in Wuppertal, when she stood in for his normal interpreter. They married in 1947.

== Ordained ministry ==
Tony was made deacon on St Matthew's Day 1947 (21 September) and ordained priest the Michaelmas following (26 September 1948) — both times by Bertram Simpson, Bishop of Southwark, at Southwark Cathedral, and began his ecclesiastical career with a curacy in Greenwich.

In December 1949, he and Sybille arrived in Ipoh, Perak where he was appointed vicar of St. John's Church. It was a time of communist, anti-colonial terrorism. Visits to remote estates had to be made with an armed guard and he was advised to wear his cassock at all times so as to be recognised as a man of God and not a colonialist. Tony helped to take the parish from a mainly expatriate congregation to one that was predominantly local. In 1955, he became Archdeacon of North Malaysia requiring him to travel to Vietnam, Thailand, Myanmar (formerly Burma) and Indonesia. His reflections on this period were captured in Vortex of the East (1963 SCM Press). In 1957, the year of Malaya's independence, he became Vicar of St. George's Church, Penang. The Malaysian poet Cecil Rajendra, a member of the St George's Youth Fellowship, describes a multi-faith group which under Tony's guidance flourished, invited to sit on the State Youth Council. In 1964 he and his family moved to Singapore where he was appointed Dean of St. Andrew's Cathedral. At this time Singapore was going through the turmoil of independence and political change. These experiences led him to write 'The Christian politician' (1967, USPG, Observation Post 4 - Political Involvement, views from Rhodesia - Ghana - Guyana - Singapore). In this he states,

The Christian.... must be involved in the political and social life of his society. If he is to be faithful to the Gospel, he cannot contract out. But, while his faith will inspire his action, he must not force on others his Christian beliefs...

In 1970, he felt it was time to make room for local leadership and tendered his resignation. He had spent 21 years in Malaya and Singapore, leading the parishes he worked in through a time of turbulence and change, establishing a firm foundation for the development of a modern Anglican church. The histories he wrote, are a valued resource to this day.

From 1970 to 1977, having returned to England, he was vicar of St Peter's Church, Stockton-on-Tees and rural dean of Stockton-on-Tees. Tony was appointed to the Episcopate as the Bishop of Dudley, serving from 1977 to his retirement in 1993. He was consecrated a bishop on 31 March 1977, by Donald Coggan, Archbishop of Canterbury at Westminster Abbey. In addition to his regular duties, he continued to do what he could to tackle the injustices he saw around him. He was chair of the Dudley Race Equality Council and helped set up Churches Housing Association of Dudley and District (CHADD).

In 1980 he became a member of the Alternative Defence Commission and contributed to its report Defence without Bombs (1983). He was part of a British Council of Churches Inter-Church Task Force on South America, visiting El Salvador and Nicaragua in 1984. In 1986 he visited Minsk, in Soviet Russia as part of a West Midlands delegation for One World Week. In 1987 he made a study tour of the GDR looking at the relationship of the churches there to government and society. As a tribute to the considerable contribution he made to the life of the Worcester diocese, his head was sculpted and installed as a corbel head on the roof of Worcester Cathedral. This can be seen in the corner by the Edgar Tower Entrance to the right of Church House.

In retirement Tony continued to chair the Singapore Malaysia Diocesan Association, serve as governor for the College of Ascension, now Selly Oak Centre for Mission Studies and chair WAITS (Women Active in Today's Society). In 1994 he travelled to the States to learn about Community Organising, run by the industrial Areas Foundation, and on his return, helped set up Birmingham's Community Organising.

He continued to serve the church as an honorary assistant bishop within the Diocese of Birmingham.

== Personal life ==
Tony was a great walker. During his time in Malaya and Singapore, together with his wife and family he spent holidays roaming the jungle around Maxwell Hill, now Bukit Larut and Taman Negara National Park. In the UK he and Sybille spent several years visiting the Torridon Hills in Scotland and later, the Italian Dolomites. In retirement he and Sybille continued their love of travel, visiting their many friends overseas. A keen gardener and follower of cricket, Tony had two sons and one daughter.

Tony Dumper died on 27 August 2012, age 88, at his care home in Bristol.

Church of England titles
Preceded by Michael Mann	Bishop of Dudley; 1977–1993	Succeeded by Rupert Hoare
