= Richard Lewis (bishop of St Edmundsbury and Ipswich) =

British Anglican bishop (1943–2020)

The Right Reverend Richard Lewis
- Bishop of St Edmundsbury and Ipswich
- Diocese: Diocese of St Edmundsbury and Ipswich
- In office: 1997–2007
- Predecessor: John Dennis
- Successor: Nigel Stock
- Other posts: Bishop of Taunton; 1992–1997; Archdeacon of Ludlow; 1987–1992

Orders
- Ordination: 1967 (deacon); 1968 (priest)
- Consecration: 1992

Personal details
- Born: 10 December 1943
- Died: 19 September 2020 (aged 76)
- Denomination: Anglican
- Education: King's College London

Member of the House of Lords
- Lord Spiritual
- Bishop of St Edmundsbury and Ipswich; 23 January 2002 – 31 July 2007

John Hubert Richard Lewis (10 December 1943 – 19 September 2020) was a British Anglican bishop.

== Education ==
Lewis was educated at Radley College and trained for the priesthood at King's College London.

== Career ==
Made deacon on Trinity Sunday 1967 (21 May) and ordained priest the Trinity Sunday following (7 June 1968) — both times by Hugh Ashdown, Bishop of Newcastle, at Newcastle Cathedral Lewis was curate of Hexham, Newcastle from 1967 to 1970. He was Industrial Chaplain from 1970 to 1977 and Communications Officer in Durham from 1977 to 1982. Between 1982 and 1987, he was Chaplain for Agriculture in Hereford, and between 1987 and 1992 Archdeacon of Ludlow.

Lewis was consecrated a bishop on 3 July 1992 by George Carey, Archbishop of Canterbury, at Westminster Abbey, to serve as suffragan Bishop of Taunton, and held this post until 1997, when he was appointed 9th Bishop of St Edmundsbury and Ipswich. During his time as Bishop of St Edmundsbury and Ipswich, he was president of the Suffolk Agricultural Association and County Show. Following the murders of five women in Ipswich by the Suffolk Strangler in 2006, Lewis led prayers for the community at an Ipswich Town F.C. match at Portman Road.

He was a member of the House of Lords from 2002 to 2007. He retired in June 2007.

== Family ==
Lewis married Sara, in 1968. They had three sons: Peter, Nick and Mike. Peter was killed by his girlfriend in 1997, who was subsequently committed to Broadmoor.

== Death ==
He died in 2020, aged 76.

Church of England titles
Preceded by Nigel McCulloch	Bishop of Taunton; 1992–1997	Succeeded by William Stewart
Preceded by John Dennis	Bishop of St Edmundsbury and Ipswich; 1997–2007	Succeeded by Nigel Stock
