= Nigel McCulloch =

Anglican bishop

The Right Reverend Nigel McCulloch KCVO
- Bishop of Manchester
- Church: Church of England
- Diocese: Diocese of Manchester
- In office: 2003–2013 (retired)
- Predecessor: Christopher Mayfield
- Successor: David Walker
- Other posts: Bishop of Wakefield; 1992–2003; Bishop of Taunton; 1986–1992

Orders
- Ordination: 1966
- Consecration: 1986 by Robert Runcie

Personal details
- Born: 17 January 1942 (age 84) Crosby, Liverpool, England
- Denomination: Anglican
- Spouse: Celia McCulloch
- Children: Two daughters
- Education: Selwyn College, Cambridge, Cuddesdon College

Member of the House of Lords
- Bishop of Manchester; 18 December 2002 – 17 January 2013
- Bishop of Wakefield; 15 October 1997 – 18 December 2002

Nigel Simeon McCulloch, KCVO (born 17 January 1942) is an Anglican cleric who held high offices from 1978 until he retired as Bishop of Manchester in 2013.

== Early life ==
McCulloch was born and brought up in Crosby, Merseyside. He was educated at Liverpool College, studied theology at Selwyn College, Cambridge, and trained for the priesthood at Cuddesdon College, Oxford.

== Career ==
He was ordained in Chester Cathedral in 1966 and served as a curate in the large urban parish of Ellesmere Port from 1966 to 1971. He was chaplain to Christ's College, Cambridge, from 1970 to 1973 and was also the Director of Studies in Theology there until 1975. He also served as Diocesan Missioner in the Diocese of Norwich from 1973 to 1978. He was appointed Archdeacon of Sarum and rector of the city-centre church of St Thomas in Salisbury in 1978.

In 1986, McCulloch was appointed as the suffragan Bishop of Taunton in the Diocese of Bath and Wells. He was ordained and consecrated a bishop (thereby taking up his suffragan See) on 29 January 1986, by Robert Runcie, Archbishop of Canterbury, at Gloucester Cathedral. In 1992 he was translated to be the diocesan Bishop of Wakefield. He was appointed Bishop of Manchester in August 2002, taking up duties later that year, and was installed in February 2003. He retired on his 71st birthday (17 January 2013).

He was appointed Lord High Almoner to Elizabeth II in 1997 and took his seat in the House of Lords in 1997. He is also chairman of the West Yorkshire Ecumenical Council and chairman of the Police Standards Committee for West Yorkshire.

McCulloch was the national chairman of the Council for Christians and Jews (CCJ) from 2008 to 2015. He is also the Chairman of the Legislative Group charged with bringing proposals to the Church of England’s General Synod regarding women becoming bishops while also enabling those opposed to this to retain an honoured place within the church.

McCulloch was elected as chair of the Greater Manchester Faith & Community Leaders Group and also the elected representative of the Faith Communities on the Greater Manchester Forum. He has been active in the Scout Movement, latterly as a County Chairman in Somerset and County President in Yorkshire. He was a member of the Select Committee reviewing the BBC Charter. Author of several books, a former columnist for The Times and a frequent broadcaster, he is the Church of England's senior spokesman on communication issues. Since 2002 he has been the National Chaplain to the Royal British Legion.

In education, McCulloch has been a governor of Marlborough College, and then of Huddersfield University while he was Bishop of Wakefield. He is chair of the board of governors at the University of Bolton, which is within the area of his Manchester diocese.

=== Sony game row ===
In June 2007, McCulloch considered taking legal action against Sony because of their PlayStation game Resistance: Fall of Man. The game features detailed views of Manchester Cathedral infested with aliens and others, to be killed by the player. The Church said Sony did not obtain permission to use the interior. Sony said "Resistance: Fall of Man is a fantasy science fiction game and is not based on reality. We believe we have sought and received all permissions necessary for the creation of the game." McCulloch also expressed concerns that a game that involved shooting people was set in Manchester Cathedral, given the city's history of gun crime.

=== Delayed retirement ===
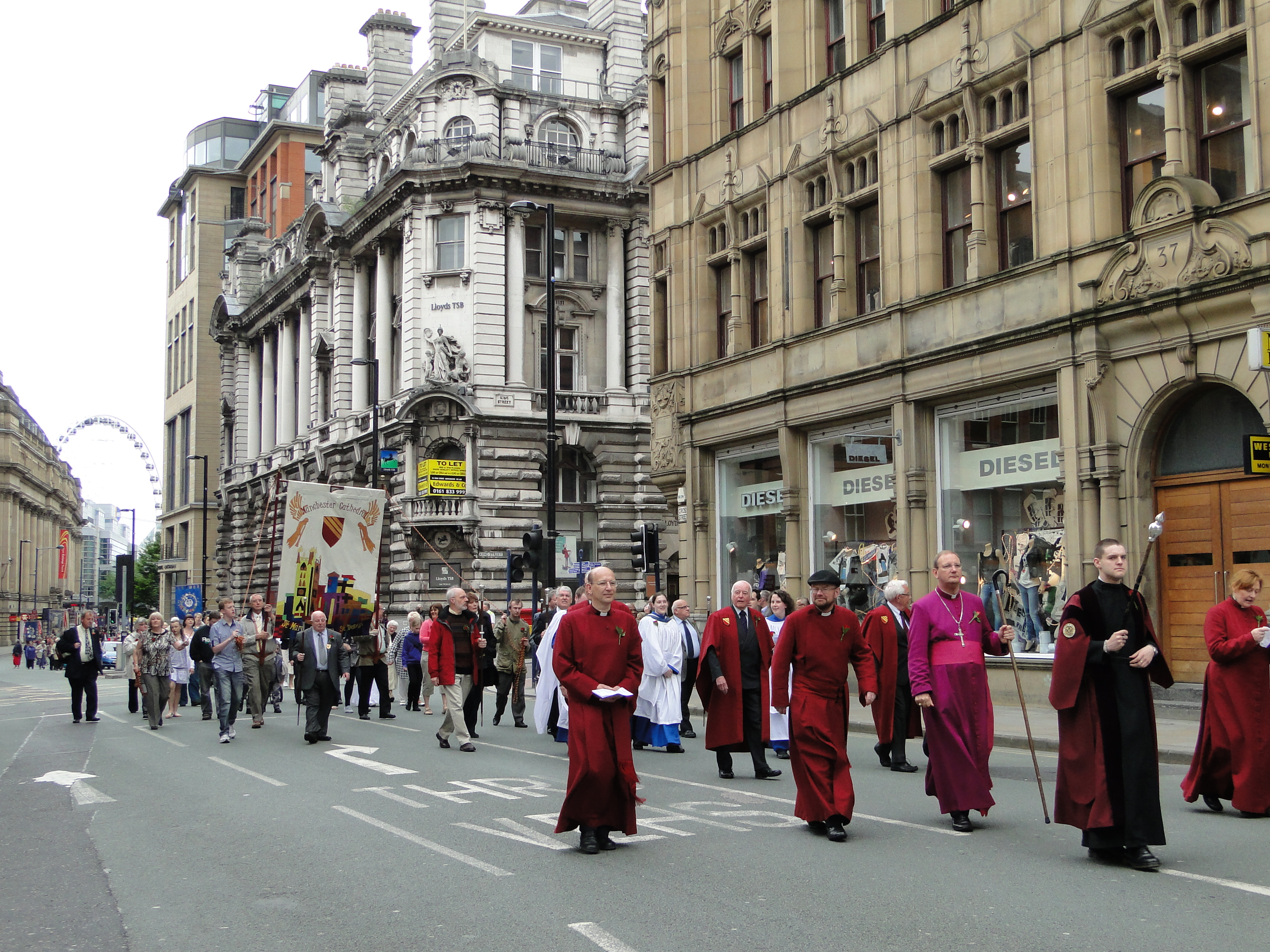
The Bishop and other clergy from Manchester Cathedral on the 2010 Whit walk in Manchester

It was announced on 21 December 2010 that McCulloch had been granted special permission to remain in his role beyond his 70th birthday by the Archbishop of York, John Sentamu. The usual age of retirement for bishops is 70, but McCulloch remained until his 71st birthday in mid-January 2013.

== Knighthood ==
On 20 February 2013, on his retirement as Lord High Almoner, the Queen invested McCulloch with the insignia of a Knight Commander of the Royal Victorian Order (KCVO). As an ordained clergyman, he does not use the title Sir.

== Personal life ==
His wife Celia is descended from 11 successive generations of Irish clergy. Their wedding in 1974 was featured on the John Betjeman documentary A Passion for Churches. On 28 June 2008 she became the first member of the Church of England to be ordained a priest by her own husband. They have two daughters.

== Styles ==
- Nigel McCulloch Esq (1942–1966)
- The Revd Nigel McCulloch (1966–1986)
- The Rt Revd Nigel McCulloch (1986–2013)
- The Rt Revd Nigel McCulloch KCVO (2013–present)

Religious titles
Preceded by Peter Nott	Bishop of Taunton; 1986–1992	Succeeded by Richard Lewis
Preceded by David Hope	Bishop of Wakefield; 1992–2003	Succeeded by Stephen Platten
Preceded by Christopher Mayfield	Bishop of Manchester; 2002–2013	Succeeded by David Walker
