= Bishop of Taunton =

List of links to articles about suffragan bishops of Bath and Wells

The Bishop of Taunton is an episcopal title used by a suffragan bishop of the Church of England Diocese of Bath and Wells, in the Province of Canterbury, England. The title was first created under the Suffragan Bishops Act 1534 and takes its name after Taunton, the county town of Somerset.

== List of bishops ==
Bishops of Taunton
| From | Until | Incumbent | Notes |
|---|---|---|---|
| 1538 | 1559 | William Finch | |
| 1559 | 1911 | in abeyance | |
| 1911 | 1931 | Charles de Salis | Archdeacon of Taunton; became Assistant Bishop of Bath and Wells |
| 1931 | 1945 | George Hollis | |
| 1945 | 1955 | Harry Thomas | |
| 1955 | 1961 | Mark Hodson | Translated to Hereford |
| 1962 | 1977 | Francis West | |
| 1977 | 1985 | Peter Nott | Translated to Norwich |
| 1986 | 1992 | Nigel McCulloch | Translated to Wakefield |
| 1992 | 1997 | Richard Lewis | Translated to St Edmundsbury and Ipswich |
| 1997 | 1998 | Will Stewart | Died in office |
| 1998 | 2006 | Andy Radford | Died in office |
| 2006 | 2015 | Peter Maurice | Retired 30 April 2015. |
| 29 September 2015 | 2025 | Ruth Worsley | also Acting Bishop of Coventry (part-time) 2023 2025; translated to Wigan to serve as Interim Bishop of Liverpool, 4 April 2025. |
| 6 February 2026 | present | Fiona Gibson | |
