= Dean of Liverpool =

Head of the chapter of Liverpool Cathedral in England

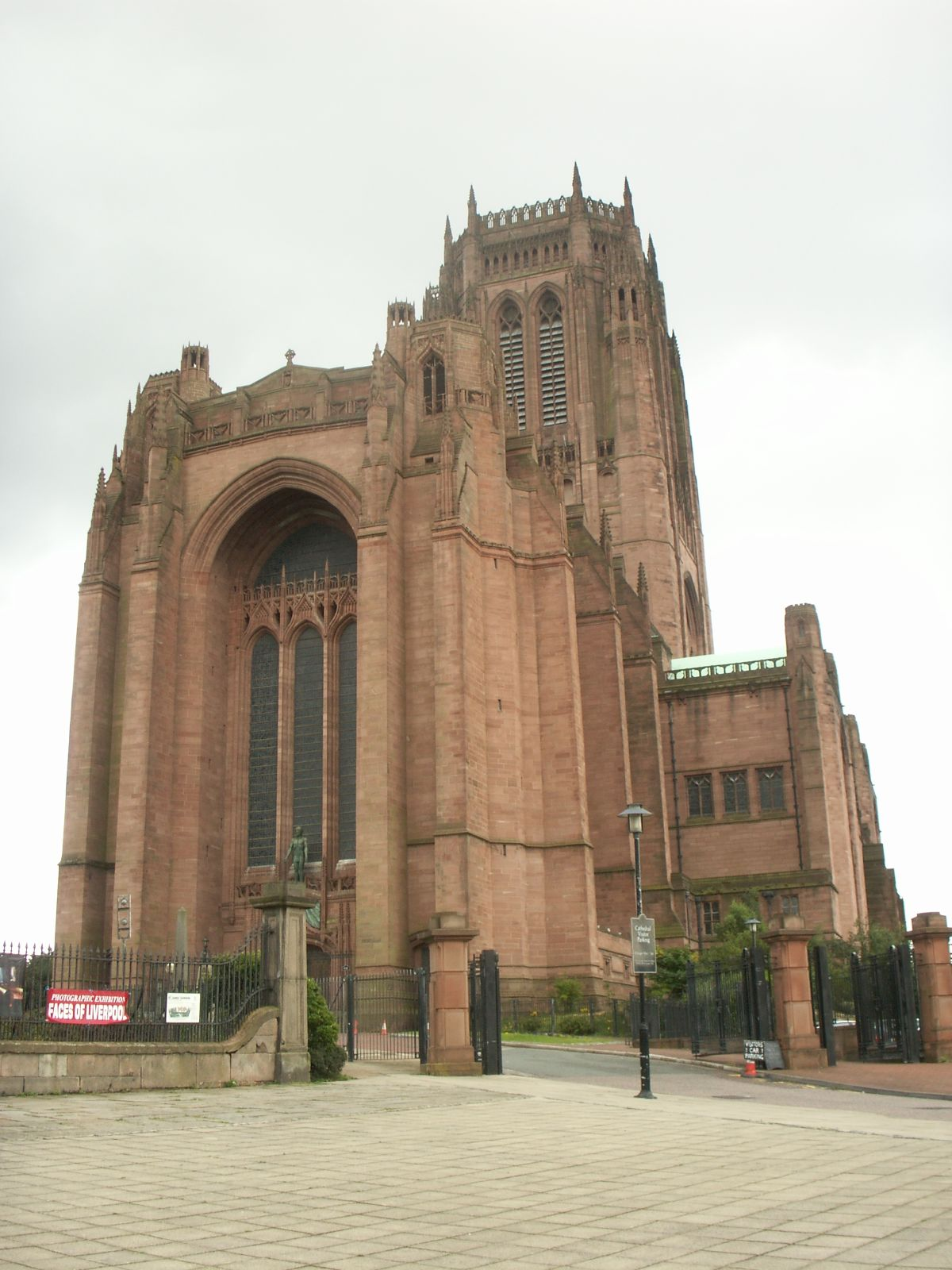
Liverpool Cathedral

The Dean of Liverpool is based in Liverpool and is head of the chapter of Liverpool Cathedral.

Sue Jones was installed as Dean on 5 May 2018. A former dean, Edward Patey, said that being Dean of Liverpool was "the best job in the Church of England".

== List of deans ==
- 1931–1955: Frederick Dwelly
- 1956–1963: Frederick Dillistone
- 1964–1983: Edward Patey
- 1983–1999: Derrick Walters
- 2000–2007: Rupert Hoare
- 2007–2011: Justin Welby (became Bishop of Durham, then Archbishop of Canterbury)
- 15 September 2012 – 5 June 2017: Pete Wilcox (became Bishop of Sheffield)
- 5 May 2018 – present: Sue Jones
