= Harry Thomas (bishop) =

British bishop

Harry Thomas was the Bishop of Taunton from 1945 until his death a decade later. Born in 1897, he served in the Welsh Regiment during the First World War. After leaving the army, he attended the Knutsford Ordination Test School, and then St David's College, Lampeter. He was made deacon in 1923, and then ordained priest in 1924. After further study at Oriel College, Oxford, he spent a short time as a missionary in Zanzibar with Universities' Mission for Central Africa. He then became a Lecturer at Ely Theological College, and then Archdeacon of Brisbane from 1938 to 1945. An Anglo Catholic he was taken ill in the summer of 1955 and died in hospital on 8 July 1955.
