= Ruth Worsley =

English bishop

The Right Reverend Ruth Worsley KHC
- Interim Bishop of Liverpool and Bishop of Wigan
- Church: Church of England
- Diocese: Diocese of Liverpool
- In office: 2025–present
- Other post: Honorary Chaplain to the Queen
- Previous posts: Bishop of Taunton (2015–2025); Archdeacon of Wiltshire (2013–2015)

Orders
- Ordination: 1996 (deacon); 1997 (priest)
- Consecration: 29 September 2015 by Justin Welby

Personal details
- Born: 1962 (age 63–64) Hampton, Middlesex, United Kingdom
- Spouse: Howard
- Children: Three
- Education: University of Manchester; St John's College, Nottingham

Ruth Elizabeth Worsley, KHC (born 1962) is a Church of England bishop. Since 2025, she has been Interim Bishop of Liverpool and Bishop of Wigan; she previously served as the Bishop of Taunton, a suffragan bishop of the Diocese of Bath and Wells; and as Archdeacon of Wiltshire.

== Early life ==
Worsley was born in 1962 in Hampton, Middlesex. She studied English literature, theology and biblical studies at the University of Manchester. While training to be a nurse, she felt the call to ministry and left to take up a position as a lay minister. She trained for ordained ministry at St John's College, Nottingham, an Anglican theological college.

== Ordained ministry ==
Worsley was ordained in the Church of England as a deacon at Michaelmas 1996 (29 September) by Patrick Harris, Bishop of Southwell at St Mary's Church, Nottingham and as a priest the Michaelmas following (5 October 1997), by Alan Morgan, Bishop of Sherwood at St Peter's Church, Ravenshead. She served curacies at St Leodegarius Church, Basford (1996 to 1998) and St Stephen's Church, Hyson Green (1998 to 2001) in Nottingham. From 2001 to 2008, she was priest-in-charge of the benefice of Hyson Green (St Stephen's Church) and Forest Fields. She was also Area Dean of Nottingham North between 2006 and 2008.

From 2007 to 2010, Worsley was Dean of Women's Ministry in the Diocese of Southwell and Nottingham and an honorary canon of Southwell Minster. In 2009 she was appointed an Honorary Chaplain to the Queen; and in 2010 to the post of Parish Development Officer for the Woolwich Area of the Diocese of Southwark. In February 2013, she was appointed Archdeacon of Wilts. She stood down as archdeacon upon becoming a bishop.

=== Episcopal ministry ===
On 30 June 2015, she was announced as the next Bishop of Taunton, a suffragan bishop in the Diocese of Bath and Wells. On 29 September 2015, she was consecrated a bishop by Justin Welby, Archbishop of Canterbury, during a service at St Paul's Cathedral, London. She was installed as Bishop of Taunton at Wells Cathedral on 2 October. Her first act as a bishop was to admit and licence nine people as readers.

On 13 September 2023, it was announced that Worsley would be seconded as Acting Bishop of Coventry. On 5 November 2024, it was announced her time would be extended to 31 December 2024.

On 28 February 2025, it was announced that Worsley was to become Interim Bishop of Liverpool (i.e. interim diocesan bishop of the Diocese of Liverpool) for a period of two years starting later in 2025; to facilitate this role, she would be translated from Taunton to the vacant suffragan See of Wigan (becoming Bishop of Wigan). She was formally appointed to the See of Wigan by letters patent issued on 4 April 2025, and was welcomed as Interim Bishop on 3 May 2025.

=== Views ===
In November 2023, she was one of 44 Church of England bishops who signed an open letter supporting the use of the Prayers of Love and Faith (i.e. blessings for same-sex couples) and called for "Guidance being issued without delay that includes the removal of all restrictions on clergy entering same-sex civil marriages, and on bishops ordaining and licensing such clergy".

== Personal life ==
Worsley is married to Howard, who is also ordained in the Church of England. Together, they have three children.

Church of England titles
Preceded by John Wraw	Archdeacon of Wiltshire; 2013 to 2015	Succeeded by Sue Groom
Preceded by Peter Maurice	Bishop of Taunton; 2015 to 2025	TBA
