= Andy Radford =

Anglican Evangelical bishop

The Right Reverend Andy Radford
- Bishop of Taunton
- Church: Church of England
- Diocese: Diocese of Bath and Wells
- In office: 3 December 1998–21 May 2006 (died in office)
- Predecessor: Will Stewart
- Successor: Peter Maurice
- Other posts: Development and Training Officer, national Comms Unit (1993–1998); Archbishops' Adviser for Bishops' Ministry (1998)

Orders
- Ordination: 1974 (deacon); 1975 (priest)
- Consecration: 3 December 1998 by George Carey

Personal details
- Born: 26 January 1944 Hengrove, Bristol, United Kingdom
- Died: 21 May 2006 (aged 62) Gloucester, Glos., UK
- Denomination: Anglican
- Parents: John (priest & canon)
- Spouse: Christine née Davis (m. 1969)
- Children: 2 daughters
- Profession: religious broadcaster
- Education: Trinity College, Bristol

Andrew John "Andy" Radford 26 January 1944 – 21 May 2006) was an Anglican Evangelical bishop and religious broadcaster. He served the Church of England as Bishop of Taunton from 1998 until his death eight years later.

Radford was born at Hengrove, where his father was curate; they later lived in Kingswood, Bristol, where his father, John (later a canon), was Vicar, and Andy attended Kingswood Grammar School. After school, he served local government and trained as an architect and surveyor. In 1972, he entered Trinity College, Bristol, to train for the ministry; ordained a deacon on 29 September 1974 and a priest on 21 September 1975 (both times by Oliver Tomkins, Bishop of Bristol, in Bristol Cathedral), his career began with a curacy at Shirehampton after which he was a producer of Religious programmes for the BBC.

Subsequently Vicar of St Barnabas with Englishcombe, Bath, Somerset (1980–1985), then Diocese of Gloucester Communications Officer (1985–1993) and an honorary canon of Gloucester Cathedral (1991–1998), then Development and Training Officer at the national Communications Unit, Church House, Westminster (1993–1998). He served briefly as the Archbishops' Adviser for Bishops' Ministry in 1998 before his appointment that year to serve the Diocese of Bath and Wells as suffragan Bishop of Taunton. He was ordained and consecrated a bishop on 3 December 1998, by George Carey, Archbishop of Canterbury, at Southwark Cathedral. He died of brain cancer in Gloucester and was survived by Christine née Davis, whom he had married in 1969, and their two daughters and two grandchildren.

Church of England titles
Preceded by Will Stewart	Bishop of Taunton; 1998–2006	Succeeded by Peter Maurice
