= William Finch (bishop) =

English bishop

William Finch was appointed Bishop of Taunton under the provisions of the Suffragan Bishops Act 1534 in 1538, a post he held to his death in 1559. He had previously been Prior of Breamore before his elevation to the episcopate. He was additionally the incumbent at West Camel from 1536.
