= Peter Nott =

English Anglican bishop

The Right Reverend Peter Nott
- Bishop of Norwich
- Diocese: Diocese of Norwich
- In office: 1985–1999
- Predecessor: Maurice Wood
- Successor: Graham James
- Other posts: Honorary assistant bishop in Oxford (1999–2018); Bishop of Taunton; 1977–1985

Orders
- Consecration: 1977

Personal details
- Born: 30 December 1933
- Died: 20 August 2018 (aged 84)
- Denomination: Anglican
- Education: Fitzwilliam College, Cambridge

Peter John Nott (30 December 1933 – 20 August 2018) was an English Anglican bishop: from 1985 to 1999, he served as Bishop of Norwich.

Nott was educated at Bristol Grammar School, Dulwich College and Fitzwilliam College, Cambridge. He began his ordained ministry as a curate at Harpenden after which he was chaplain at Fitzwilliam College and then Rector of Beaconsfield. In 1977 he was appointed the suffragan Bishop of Taunton; he was ordained a bishop on 18 October 1977, by Donald Coggan, Archbishop of Canterbury, at St Paul's Cathedral. He was translated to be the Bishop of Norwich upon the confirmation of his election on 12 November 1985. He retired in 1999 but continued to serve as an honorary assistant bishop in the Diocese of Oxford.
