= Bishop of Liverpool =

Diocesan bishop in the Church of England

- Bishopric

anglican
- Incumbent (vacant); Ruth Worsley, Bishop of Wigan (ad interim)

Location
- Ecclesiastical province: York
- Residence: Bishop's Lodge, Woolton

Information
- First holder: J. C. Ryle
- Established: 1880
- Diocese: Liverpool
- Cathedral: Liverpool Cathedral

The Bishop of Liverpool is the ordinary of the Church of England Diocese of Liverpool in the Province of York.

The diocese stretches from Southport in the north to Widnes in the south, and from the River Mersey to Wigan in the east. Its see is in the City of Liverpool at the Cathedral Church of Christ. The bishop's residence is Bishop's Lodge, Woolton — east of Liverpool city centre.

The office has existed since the founding of the diocese in 1880 under Queen Victoria.

On 28 February 2025, it was announced that Ruth Worsley was to become Interim Bishop of Liverpool (i.e. interim diocesan bishop of the Diocese of Liverpool) for a period of two years starting later in 2025; to facilitate this role, she was translated from Taunton to the vacant suffragan See of Wigan (becoming Bishop of Wigan) by letters patent issued on 4 April. She was then welcomed as Interim Bishop on 3 May 2025, initially as an honorary assistant bishop, pending her translation to be Bishop suffragan of Wigan.

== List of bishops ==
Bishops of Liverpool
From	Until	Incumbent	Notes
1880	1900	John Charles Ryle	Nominated on 11 May and consecrated on 11 June 1880. Resigned on 1 March 1900 and died on 10 June 1900.
1900	1923	Francis Chavasse	Nominated on 24 March and consecrated on 25 April 1900. Resigned on 1 October 1923 and died on 11 March 1928.
1923	1944	Albert David	Translated from St Edmundsbury and Ipswich. Nominated on 3 October and confirmed on 18 October 1923. Resigned on 15 April 1944 and died on 24 December 1950.
1944	1966	Clifford Martin	Nominated on 3 July and consecrated on 25 July 1944. Resigned on 30 November 1965 and died on 11 August 1977.
1966	1975	Stuart Blanch	Nominated on 22 December 1965 and consecrated on 25 March 1966. Translated to York on 9 January 1975.
1975	1997	David Sheppard	Translated from Woolwich. Nominated on 2 May and confirmed on 3 June 1975. Resigned in 1997, created Baron Sheppard of Liverpool on 14 February 1998, and died on 5 March 2005. Represented England at cricket 22 times.
1998	2013	James Jones	Translated from Hull. Nominated and confirmed in 1998.
23 July 2014	2022	Paul Bayes	Translated from Hertford. Installed on 15 November 2014 at Liverpool Cathedral; retired 1 March 2022.
2023	2025	John Perumbalath	Translated from Bishop of Bradwell; confirmed 20 January 2023; went on leave 30 January 2025 after facing allegations of misconduct from two women, including another bishop; formally resigned the See effective 31 July 2025.
2025	ad interim	Ruth Worsley, interim bishop and Bishop of Wigan	Previously Bishop of Taunton; also suffragan See of Wigan since 4 April 2025; interim diocesan bishop, 3 May 2025.

== Assistant bishops ==
Among those who have served as Assistant Bishop of Liverpool were:

- 1968–1987 (ret.): William (Bill) Baker, lecturer at St Katharine's College until 1975 and former Anglican Bishop of Zanzibar

Those who have served in retirement as honorary assistant bishops include:

- 1946 – 1958 (d.): Herbert Gresford Jones, canon residentiary (until 1956) and retired Bishop of Warrington
