= Frederick Dillistone =

Frederick William Dillistone (9 May 1903 – 5 October 1993) was the second Dean of Liverpool.

Dillistone was educated at Brighton College and Brasenose College, Oxford. Ordained in 1928, he began his ecclesiastical career with a curacy at St Jude's Southsea. Later, he was a tutor at Wycliffe Hall, Oxford and then Vicar of St Andrew's in the same city. From 1938 to 1945 he was Professor of Theology at Wycliffe College, Toronto, and Vice Principal of London College of Divinity from 1945-1947. From then until 1952 he was Professor of Theology at the Episcopal Divinity School at Cambridge, Massachusetts. Moving back to England he was Canon Residentiary and Chancellor of Liverpool Cathedral from 1952 to 1956 and then its Dean until 1963. From 1964 until his retirement in 1970, he was Fellow and Chaplain of Oriel College, Oxford. In 1968, he delivered the Bampton Lectures under the title 'Traditional Symbols and the Contemporary World'. An eminent author, he died at the age of 90 years. He was known to friends as 'Dilly'.

== Notes ==
Religious titles
Preceded by Frederick William Dwelly	Dean of Liverpool; 1956–1963	Succeeded by Edward Henry Patey
