= Parish of the Falkland Islands =

Anglican Communion parish

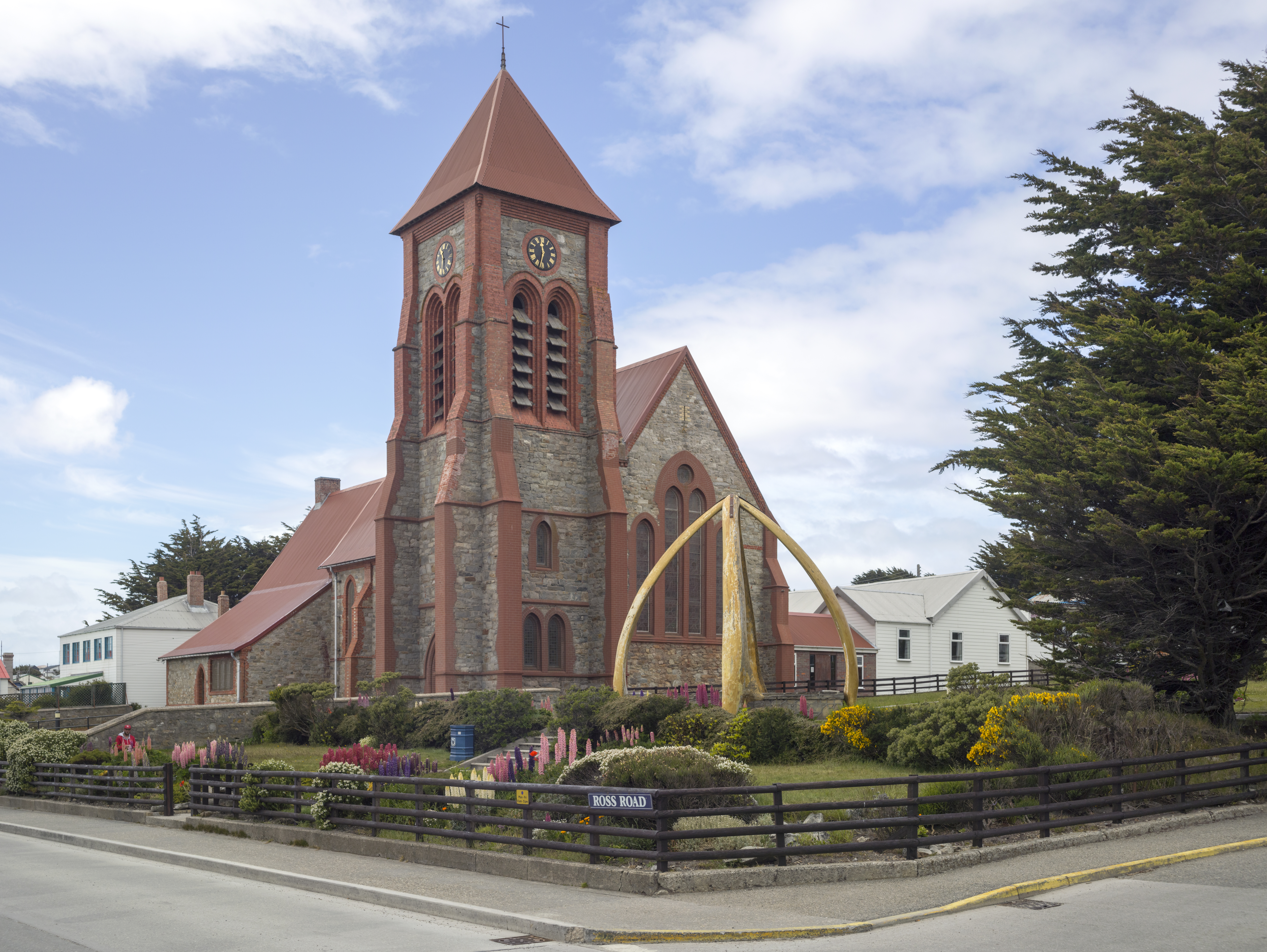
Christ Church Cathedral, Port Stanley, Falkland Islands

The Parish of the Falkland Islands is an extra-provincial church in the Anglican Communion. In 1869, the "Diocese of the Falkland Isles" with jurisdiction over the rest of South America except for British Guiana was established. The name was due to a legal technicality: at that time, no English bishop could be consecrated for areas outside the jurisdiction of the Crown. From the start, the bishop's actual residence and diocesan administrative offices were in Buenos Aires. From 1902 to 1973, the jurisdiction of the diocese was progressively reduced in area as more dioceses were established in South America, and after the formation of the Consejo Anglicano Sudamericano in 1973 as a step towards the formation of a new province of the Anglican Communion. The parish became extra-provincial under direct jurisdiction of the Archbishop of Canterbury. Until the war between Britain and Argentina in 1982, at the Archbishop's request, episcopal functions were performed by the Anglican Bishop of Argentina.

== History, 1869–1978 ==
Waite Hockin Stirling was consecrated the first bishop of the diocese in 1869. After his tenure, the history of the Falkland Islands diocese largely followed the waxing and waning fortunes of the South American Missionary Society (SAMS). In 1910, the diocese was divided for the first time into "East Coast" and "West Coast". Edward Every became Bishop of Argentina and Eastern South America, and Lawrence Blair became Bishop of the Falkland Islands, which included oversight of Chile, Bolivia and Peru. He resigned in 1914 and Every took the post. 1910 was also the year of the World Missionary Conference at Edinburgh.

Norman de Jersey was bishop for 15 years. In 1934 he was succeeded by John Weller. Financial constraints caused him to consolidate, becoming Bishop of Argentina and Eastern South America while retaining oversight of the Falkland Islands, which technically was a vacant see until 1946. Ivor Evans, formerly of Rio de Janeiro, took over in 1946 when the diocese was once more united as the Diocese of the Falkland Islands, covering nearly all of South America. He died of a heart attack in southern Chile in 1962.

After a 1963 convention in Cuernavaca, Mexico, the Anglican Communion underwent dramatic changes and the vast diocese was divided into three parts. The West Coast Diocese of Chile, Bolivia and Peru came under Kenneth Howell, a former South American Missionary Society (SAMS) missionary, and Cyril Tucker was consecrated under two separate mandates: one as Bishop of Argentina and Eastern South America, and the other as Bishop of the Falkland Islands. The SAMS played an important part in financing and establishing the two bishoprics.

As a result of increased SAMS activity, more dioceses were created: Northern Argentina and Paraguay in 1973; the Diocese of Peru in 1977; Uruguay in 1988 and Bolivia in 1996 (now all part of the Anglican Province of the Southern Cone of South America). The South America Dioceses joined to form the Anglican Council of South America, which included the Falkland Islands. This proved unsuitable for congregations on the Falklands, as proceedings were conducted in Spanish, and most of the residents were English-speaking.

== History from 1978 ==
In 1978, Donald Coggan, Archbishop of Canterbury, assumed personal responsibility for the Falkland Islands, with episcopal oversight exercised by his commissary. The first Episcopal Commissary for the Falkland Islands was Richard Cutts in Buenos Aires, an Anglo-Argentine and former missionary in Africa, who had succeeded Cyril Tucker in 1975. In 1982, during the Falklands War many British troops came under the episcopal oversight of the Bishop to the Forces. The Archbishop of Canterbury decided to exercise his responsibility by giving his commission to any bishop visiting the islands. In January 2007, Stephen Venner was appointed Episcopal Commissary, succeeded by Nigel Stock in 2014. The Episcopal Commissary is also known as Bishop for the Falkland Islands.

Since 1978, the clergy of the cathedral have adopted the office of Rector. The post was held successively by Harry Bagnall (1979–1986), John Murphy (1987–1991), Stephen Palmer (1991–1996), Alistair McHaffie (1998–2003), Paul Sweeting (2003–2006), Richard Hines (2007–2014), Canon David Roper (2014–2015), Nicholas Mercer (2017–2018), Ian Faulds (2018–2022), Hayley Argles-Grant (2023-).

In 2013, the Church of Norway handed over the Norwegian Lutheran Church on South Georgia to the Anglican Diocese of the Falkland Islands.

== See also ==
- Bishop of the Falkland Islands
- Christ Church Cathedral (Falkland Islands)
