= Religion in the Falkland Islands =

Religion in the Falkland Islands in 2016.
1. Christianity (Note: Including Jehovah's Witness) (57.5%)
2. No religion (35.4%)
3. Not specified (6.00%)
4. Others (Note: Including Baha'i, Buddhist, Muslim, and Other in the Census) (1.16%)

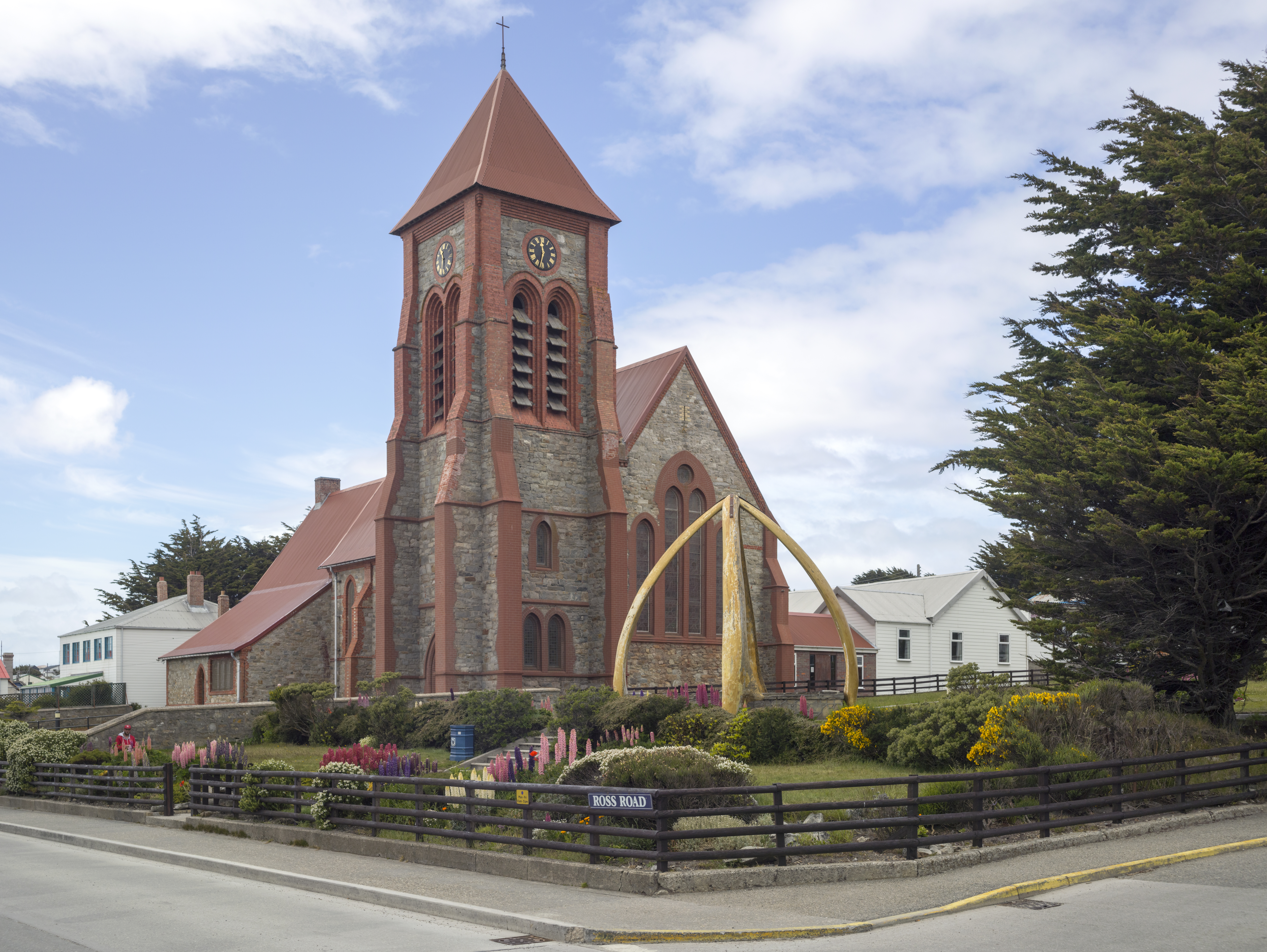
Christ Church Cathedral in Stanley

Christianity is the most predominant religion in the Falkland Islands; the primary denominations are Church of England, Roman Catholic, United Free Church, Lutheran, Jehovah's Witnesses, Seventh-day Adventists among others. In the 2006 census most islanders identified themselves as Christian (67.2 percent), followed by those who refused to answer or had no religious affiliation (31.5 percent). The remaining 1.3 percent (39 people) were adherents of other faiths.

== Anglican ==
The Anglican Parish of the Falkland Islands is an extra-provincial church in the Anglican Communion. The principal Anglican place of worship in the Falkland Islands is Christ Church Cathedral in Stanley. The archbishop of Canterbury serves as ex officio bishop of the Falkland Islands. In 2017, a study published by Routledge found that there were 810 Anglicans in the Falkland Islands.

== Roman Catholic ==
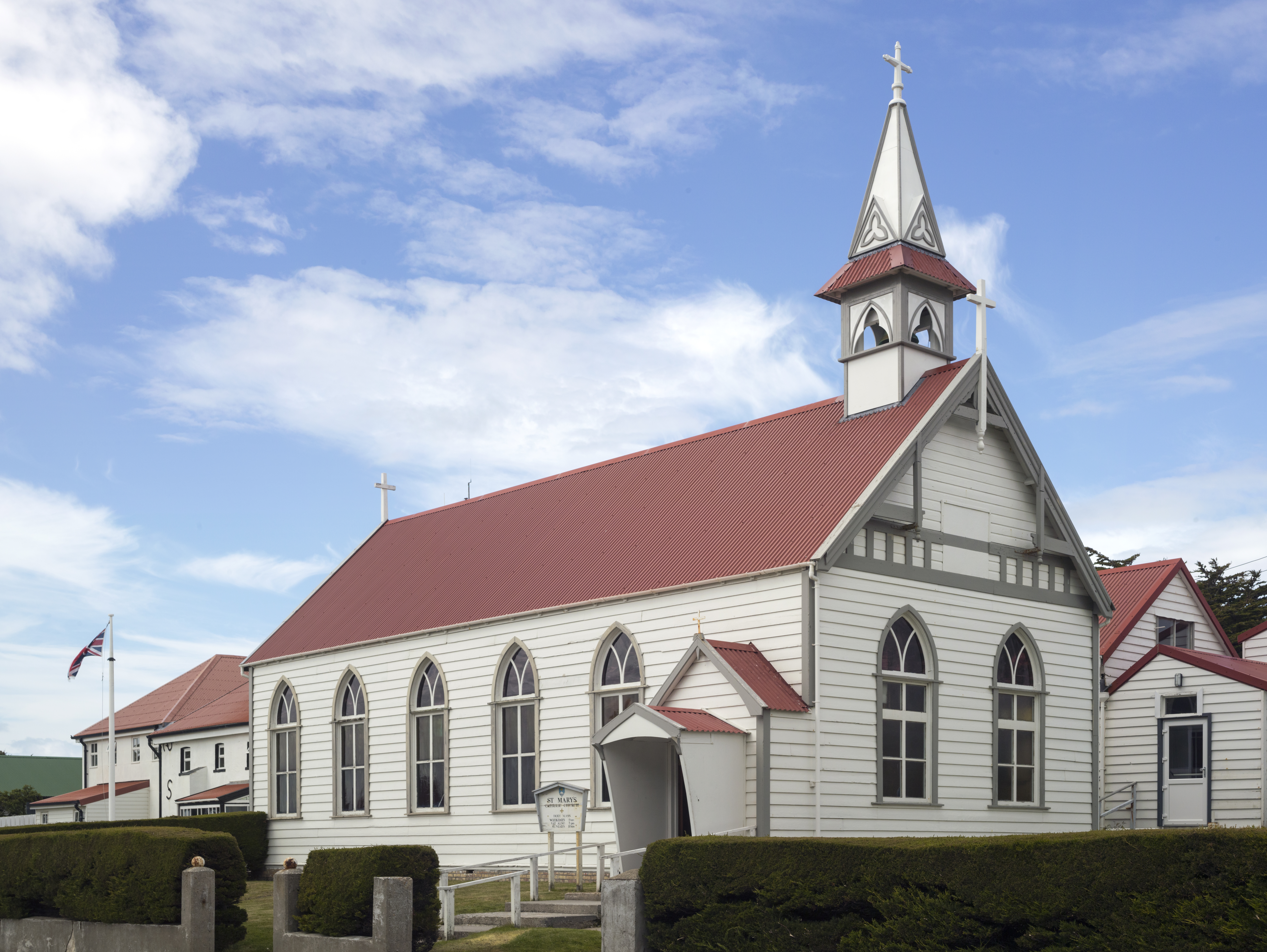
St. Mary's Catholic Church in Stanley

There are over 230 Roman Catholics in the Falkland Islands, approximately 10% of the total population. There are no dioceses in the islands, instead they form an apostolic prefecture which was erected in January 1952. St Mary's Catholic Church in Ross Road in Stanley is the sole Catholic Church on the Falkland Islands. Outside of Stanley, Catholic masses are celebrated at RAF Mount Pleasant.

== Presbyterian ==
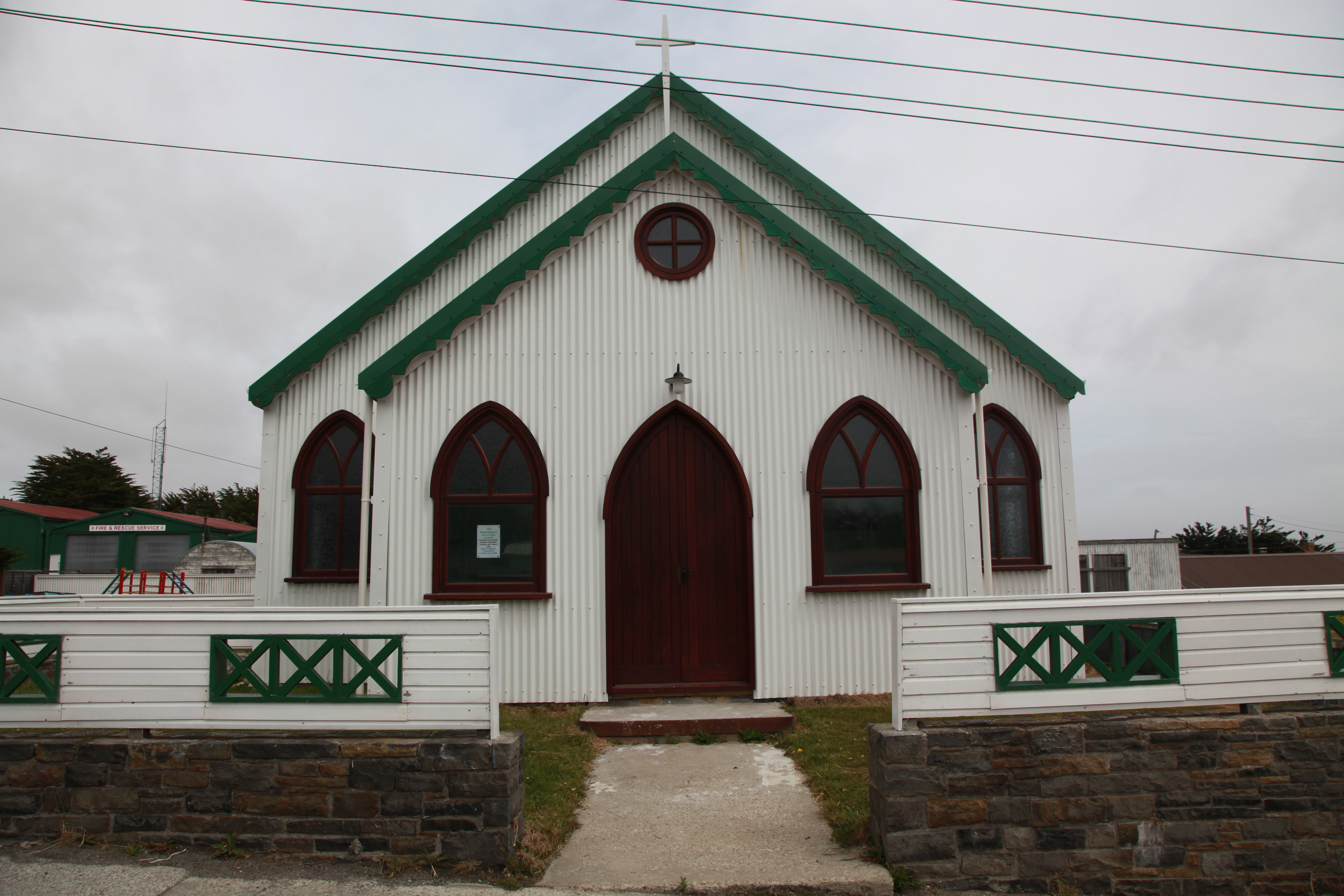
The United Free Church Tabernacle in Stanley.

Before the Disruption of 1843 the dominant religion was Church of Scotland. This was thereafter the Free Church of Scotland as most islanders sided with this more conservative view on religion. From 1900 this, as with the majority of Free Church of Scotland congregations, became the United Free Church of Scotland, on the island just called the United Free Church. From 1871 to 1883 their minister was Rev Anthony Yeoman (1821-1889).

The United Free Church in the Falkland Islands has five congregations with 120 active members. The Tabernacle, one of the five congregations is in Stanley and it was established in 1899. From 1934 to 1965, Rev Forrest McWhan (1913-1965), originally a Church of Scotland missionary, was the minister of The Tabernacle.

== Baptist ==
Charles Spurgeon of the Metropolitan Tabernacle in London sent materials for the a church to be constructed. The church is currently located in Stanley and is known as the Tabernacle Free Church.

== Jehovah's Witnesses ==
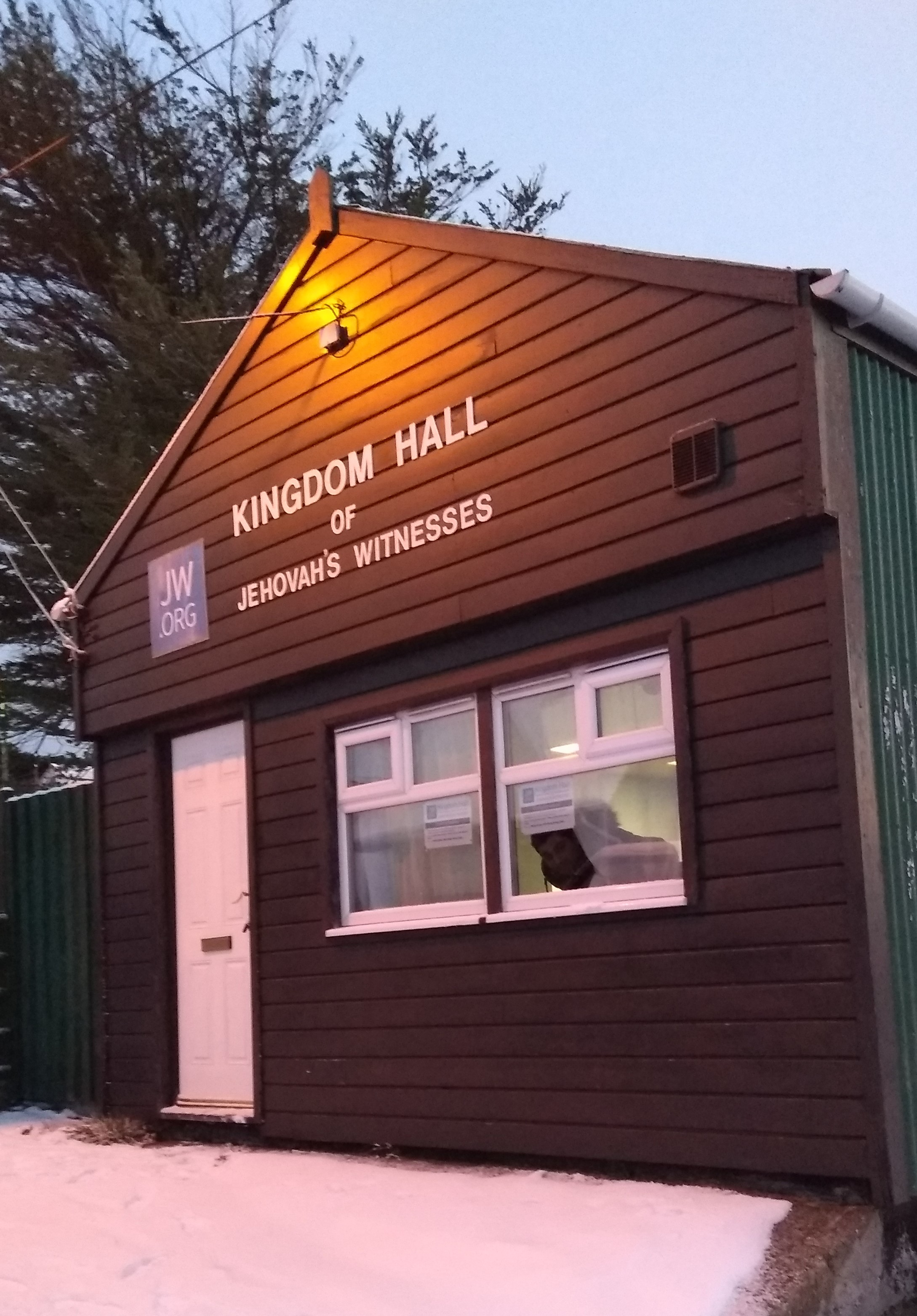
Kingdom Hall.

There is a Kingdom Hall of Jehovah's Witnesses located on Dean Street in Stanley. Jehovah's Witnesses have had an active presence in the area since the late 1950s, primarily known for their preaching work throughout the town. Over the past decade, the number of members has fluctuated between 7 and 16.

== Other groups ==
As of 31 December 2011, The Church of Jesus Christ of Latter-day Saints reported ten members in the Falkland Islands.

Smaller numbers are of Seventh-day Adventists, around 8 members according to data from the Church itself and Greek Orthodox are also to be found, with the latter being due to Greek fishermen passing through.

=== Bahai Faith ===
A small number of followers of the Baháʼí Faith live on the islands, and have a policy of trying to settle remote locations.

=== Islam ===
According to the 2006 census, a small Muslim population of nine individuals—making up 0.3% of the total population—resided in East Falkland.

=== Judaism ===
As of 2006, there is one individual of Jewish faith residing in the Falkland Islands.
