= Anglican Diocese of Argentina =

Anglican diocese in southern and central Argentina

Diocese of Argentina Diócesis de Argentina
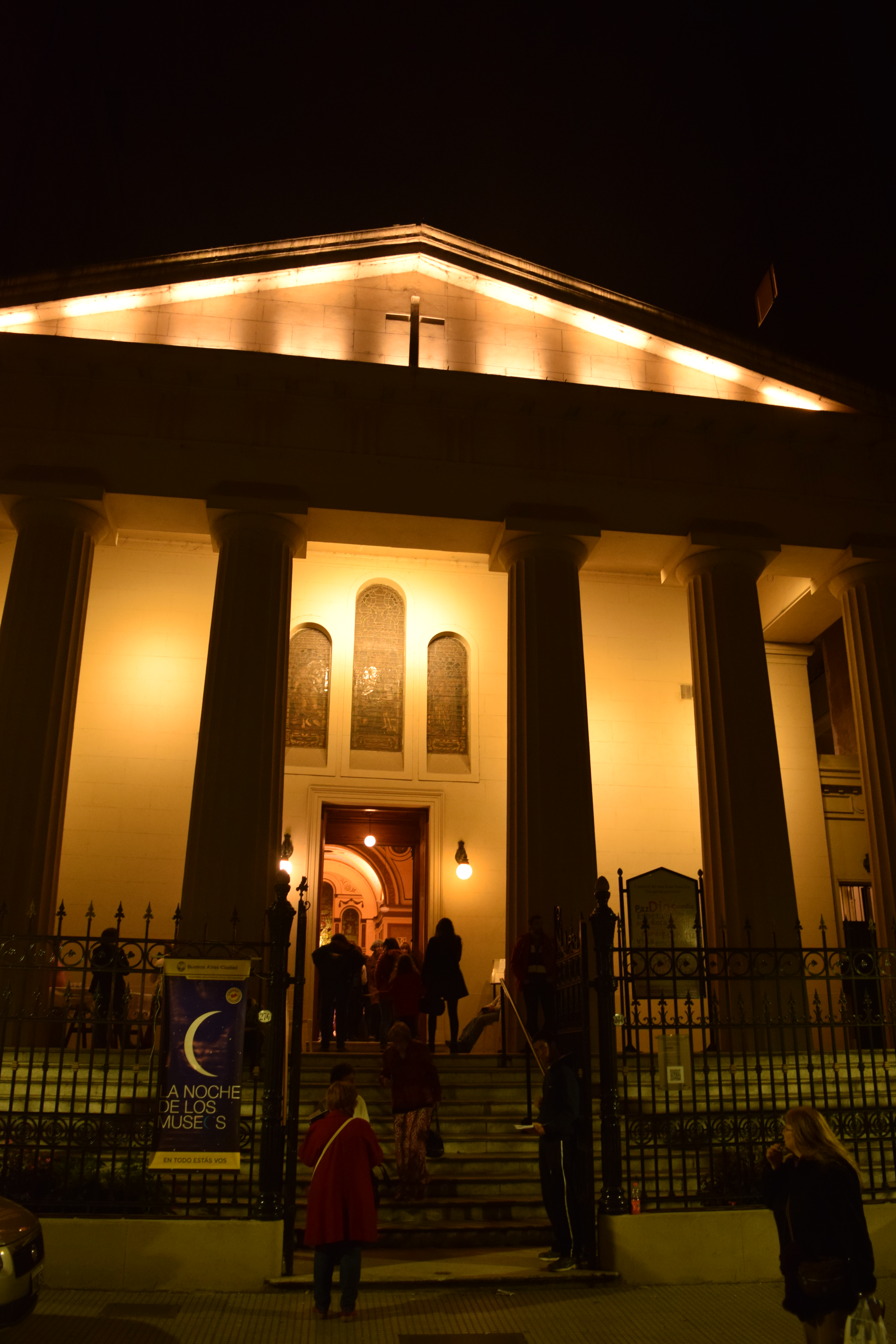
- The Anglican Cathedral of St. John the Baptist in Buenos Aires

Information
- Established: 1910
- Language: Anglican Cathedral of St. John the Baptist

Current leadership
- Parent church: Anglican Church of South America
- Diocesan bishop: Brian Williams
- Archdeacon: Hernán Dei Castelli

Website
- anglicana.org.ar

The Diocese of Argentina is a diocese in the Anglican Communion within the Anglican Church of South America.

== History ==
The diocese was founded in 1910 from the Diocese of the Falkland Islands.

The diocesan seat is the Cathedral of St John the Baptist in Buenos Aires, which at one time succeeded the Falkland Islands as the episcopal seat for the whole of South America but it is now the seat for the Diocese of Argentina only. The Diocese of Northern Argentina was split off from the diocese in 1969.

The incumbent diocesan bishop is Brian Williams, who was appointed in 2020.

== List of bishops ==
- Waite Stirling (1869–1900)
- Edward Every (1902–1937)
- John Weller (1937–1945)
- Ivor Evans (1946–1962)
- Cyril Tucker (1963–1975)
- Richard Stanley Cutts (1975–1989)
- David Leake (1990–2002)
- Gregory Venables (2002–2020)
- Brian Williams (2020–present)

== Companion diocese ==
The Diocese of Sheffield in the Church of England
