= Tim Thornton (bishop) =

British Anglican bishop (born 1957)

The Right Reverend Tim Thornton
- Bishop at Lambeth
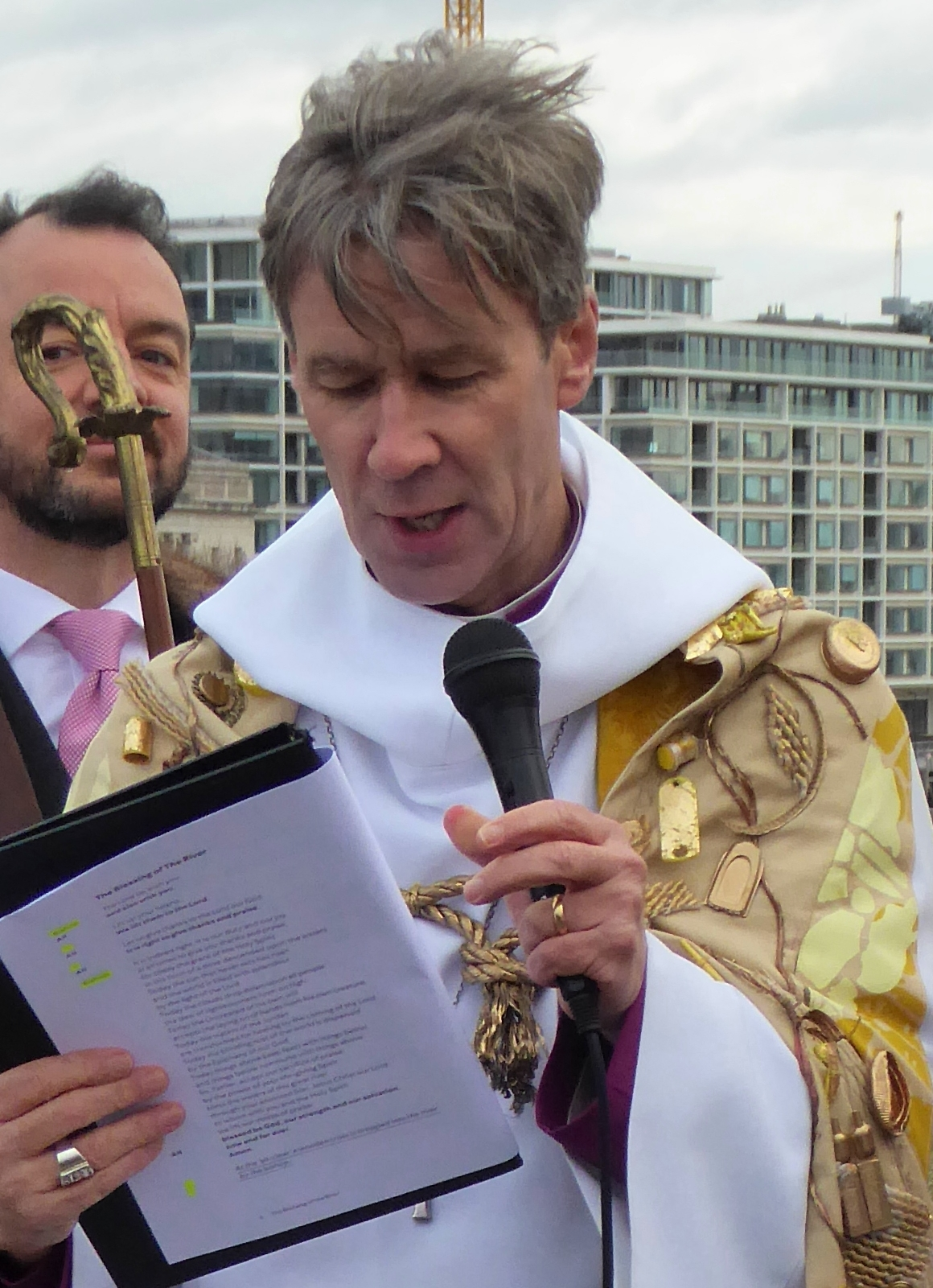
- Thornton at the 2019 Blessing the Thames ceremony on London Bridge
- Church: Church of England
- In office: 6 September 2017 – 2021
- Predecessor: Nigel Stock
- Successor: Emma Ineson (as Bishop to the Archbishops of Canterbury and York)
- Other posts: Bishop to the Forces and Bishop for the Falkland Islands
- Previous posts: Lord Spiritual (2013–2017); Bishop of Truro (2009–2017); Bishop of Sherborne (2001–2008)

Orders
- Ordination: 1980
- Consecration: 21 October 2001 by George Carey

Personal details
- Born: 14 April 1957 (age 69)
- Denomination: Anglican
- Residence: Lambeth Palace
- Spouse: Siân
- Children: 2
- Education: University of Southampton; King's College London

Member of the House of Lords
- Lord Spiritual
- Bishop of Truro; 22 April 2013 – 31 August 2017

Timothy Martin Thornton (born 14 April 1957) is a retired British Anglican bishop. His final post was as Bishop at Lambeth, Bishop to the Forces, and Bishop for the Falkland Islands (2017–2021). He was previously the area Bishop of Sherborne from 2001 to 2008, the diocesan Bishop of Truro (2009–2017), and a Member of the House of Lords (2013–2017).

== Early life and education ==
Thornton was born on 14 April 1957. He was educated at Devonport High School for Boys, an all-boys grammar school in Plymouth, Devon. He studied theology at the University of Southampton, and graduated with a Bachelor of Arts (BA) degree in 1978. That year, he entered St Stephen's House, Oxford, an Anglo-Catholic theological college, to train for the priesthood. He later studied at King's College London graduating with an MA in 1997.

== Ordained ministry ==
He was ordained in the Church of England: made a deacon at Petertide 1980 (29 June) and ordained a priest the Petertide following (28 June 1981), both times by Colin James, Bishop of Wakefield at Wakefield Cathedral. He began his ministry with a curacy at Todmorden and then as priest-in-charge at Walsden. He then became bishop's chaplain to David Hope: successively in the Diocese of Wakefield and the Diocese of London. From 1994 until 1998 he was Principal of the North Thames Ministerial Training Course. His final post before his ordination to the episcopate was as the vicar of Kensington.

=== Episcopal ministry ===
On 21 October 2001, Thornton was consecrated a bishop by George Carey, the then Archbishop of Canterbury, at Southwark Cathedral. From 2001 to 2008, he served as the Bishop of Sherborne, an area bishop of the Diocese of Salisbury. He was installed as Bishop of Truro at Truro Cathedral on 7 March 2009.

In 2013, Thornton became eligible to join the Lord Spiritual in the House of Lords upon the retirement of Nigel McCulloch, the then Bishop of Manchester, as the next longest serving diocesan bishop. He officially became a Lord spiritual on 31 January 2013; however, he did not take his seat until he was introduced to the House in April 2013.

On 4 April 2017, it was announced that he was to resign his see to become Bishop at Lambeth, the Archbishop of Canterbury's episcopal chief of staff at Lambeth Palace, in September 2017. Thornton retired as Bishop at Lambeth effective 30 September 2021, having already resigned as Bishop to the Forces and for the Falklands — his successors in these two posts were each commissioned on 20 September 2021.

Since 2017, he has been an honorary assistant bishop in the dioceses of London, Portsmouth, and Southwark. He also holds permission to officiate in the Diocese of Salisbury.

From 1 January 2025, Thornton is to act as bishop for the Diocese of Coventry between the end of Ruth Worsley's time as Acting Bishop and Sophie Jelley's arrival as Bishop of Coventry.

=== Other work ===
Thornton has chaired the Board of Trustees of The Children's Society from 2010. He was a trustee of the Church Army 2000–2008. He is a trustee of the following Cornish charities: Volunteer Cornwall, BF Adventure (formerly Bishops Forum), Cornwall Community Foundation.

In 2015, Thornton was the Anglican delegate to the XIV Ordinary General Assembly of the (Roman Catholic) Synod of Bishops.

=== Elliott Review controversy ===
In March 2016, Thornton was cited in a Guardian report on the Elliott Review as one of several senior figures who had received a disclosure of child sex abuse but had "no recollection". The review, led by Ian Elliott, found this lack of memory difficult to countenance. "What is surprising about this is that he (the survivor) would be speaking about a serious and sadistic sexual assault allegedly perpetrated by a senior member of the hierarchy. The fact that these conversations could be forgotten about is hard to accept", Elliott wrote. The survivor had tried repeatedly to alert the archbishop's office to critical concerns arising from these denials, but was ignored on the instruction of the church's insurers. The resulting Elliott Review led to damning headlines across the UK and world media and kickstarted significant cultural and structural change in the Church of England's response to sex abuse cases. The review called for all bishops to be retrained. The Archbishop of Canterbury, Justin Welby, reportedly said "the situation is embarrassing and uncomfortable for the church". In an open letter the survivor urged Thornton to lead a call for repentance across the House of Bishops.

From October 2016, Thornton sat on the Church of England's National Safeguarding Steering Group (NSSG)

== Personal life ==
Thornton is married to Siân, one of His Majesty's Inspectors of Education (HMI) in England. Together, they have two adult children.

== Styles ==
- The Reverend Tim Thornton (1980–2001)
- The Right Reverend Tim Thornton (2001–present)

Church of England titles
Preceded by John Kirkham	Bishop of Sherborne; 2001–2008	Succeeded by Graham Kings
Preceded by Bill Ind	Bishop of Truro; 2008–2017	Succeeded by Philip Mounstephen
Preceded by Nigel Stock	Bishop at Lambeth; 2017–2021	Next: Emma Ineson as Bishop to the Archbishops of Canterbury and York
Preceded by Nigel Stock	Bishop to the Forces; 2017–2021	Next: Hugh Nelson, Bishop of St Germans
Preceded by Nigel Stock	Bishop for the Falkland Islands; 2017–2021	Next: Jonathan Clark, Bishop of Croydon
