= Larry Blair =

Larry Blair may refer to:

- Larry Blair (basketball) player in 2006–07 NCAA Division I men's basketball season
- Larry Blair (surfer) in Billabong Pipeline Masters
- Larry Blair (businessman), co-founder of Kalpana

== See also ==
- Lawrence Blair (born 1942), British anthropologist, author, explorer and filmmaker
- Lawrence Blair (bishop) (1868–1925), English bishop
