= Christ Church Cathedral (Falkland Islands) =

Church in Stanley, Falkland Islands

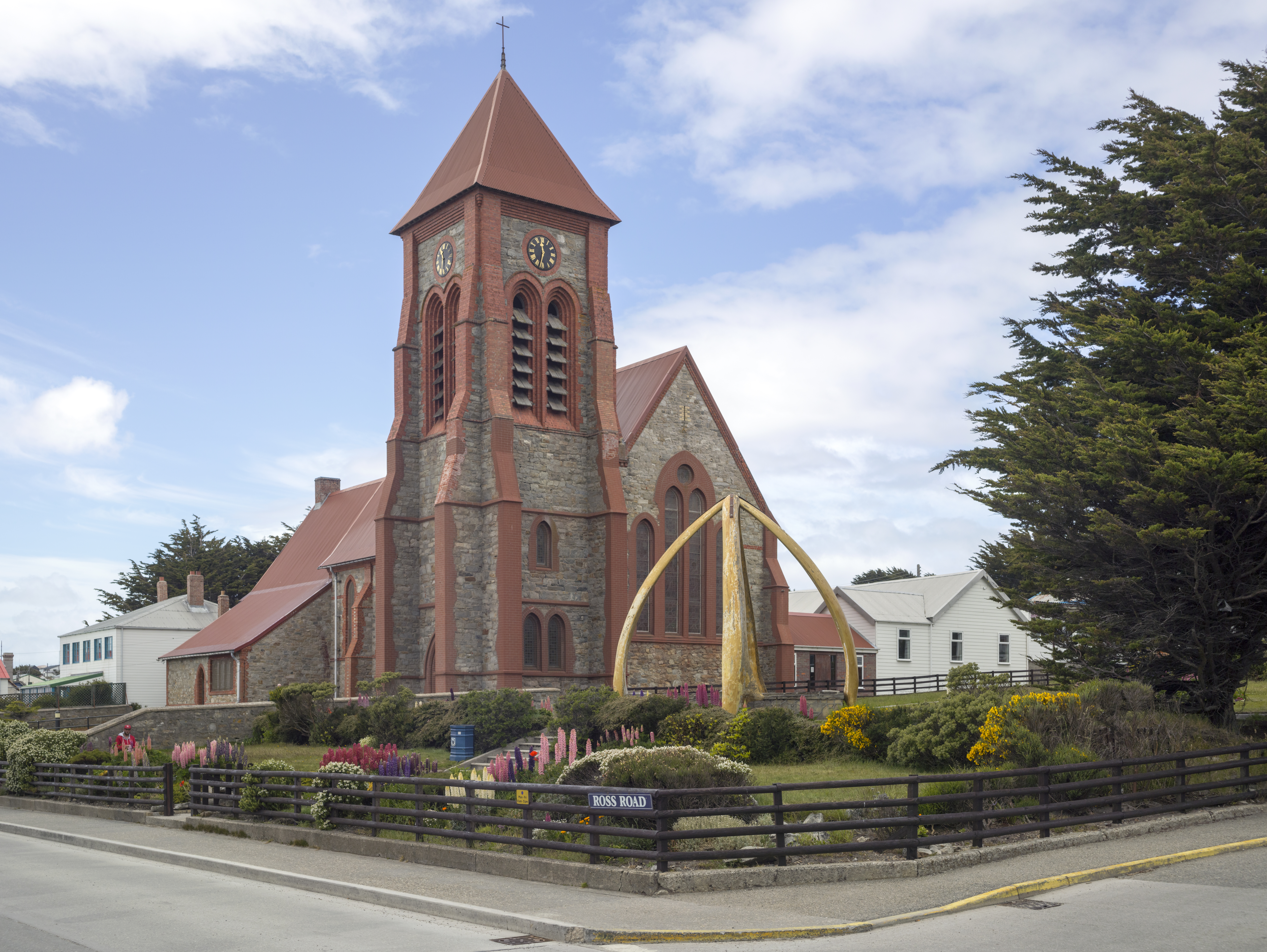
- The cathedral and whalebone arch in 2016

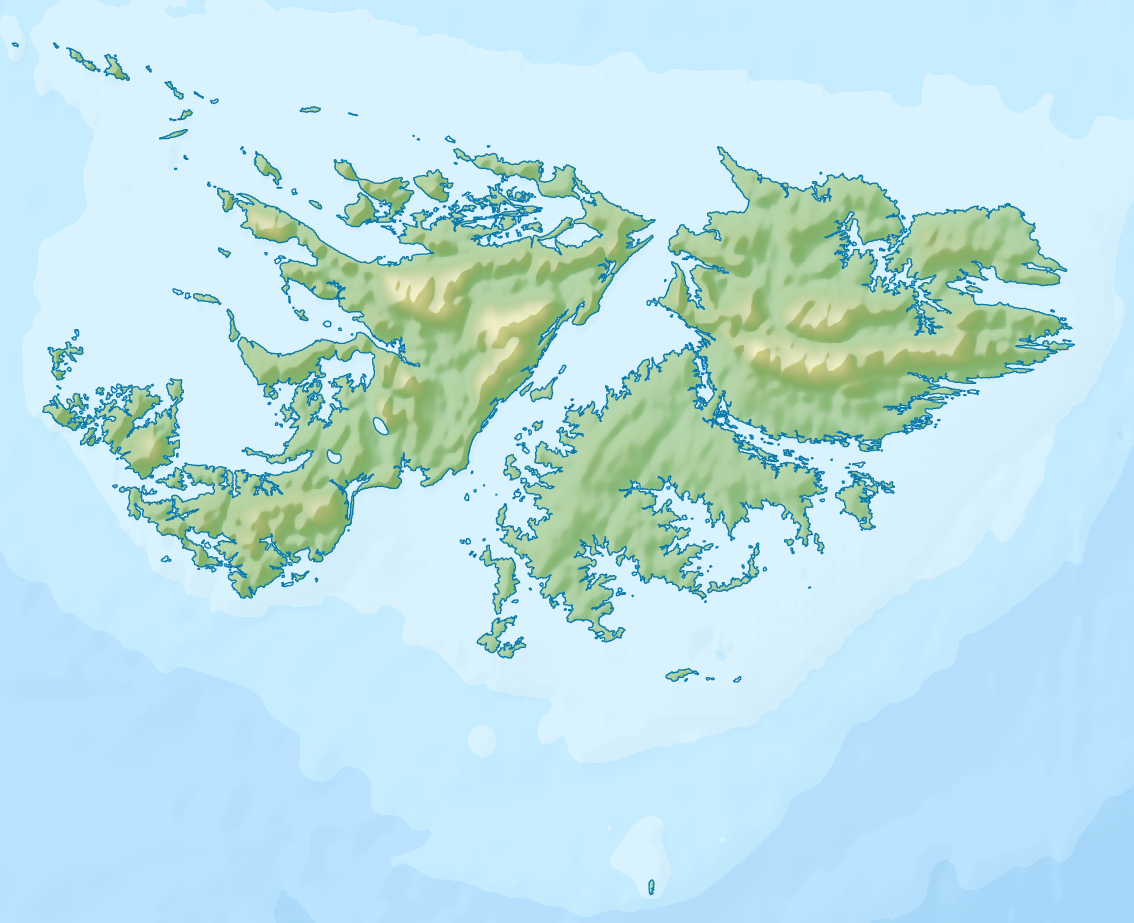
- Location within Falkland Islands
- 51°41′32″S 57°51′31″W
- Location: Stanley
- Country: Falkland Islands
- Denomination: Anglican

History
- Consecrated: February 21, 1892

Administration
- Parish: Falkland Islands

Clergy
- Archbishop: Sarah Mullally
- Bishop: Jonathan Clark

Christ Church Cathedral, in Stanley, Falkland Islands, is the southernmost Anglican cathedral in the world. It is the parish church of the Falkland Islands, South Georgia and the British Antarctic Territories. The Parish of the Falkland Islands is part of the Anglican Communion. The rector of the cathedral is under the ordinary jurisdiction of the Bishop of the Falkland Islands; since 1978, this office has been held ex officio by the Archbishop of Canterbury, who is both ordinary and metropolitan for the small autonomous diocese. In practice, authority is exercised through a bishop-commissary appointed by the Archbishop of Canterbury, and known as the Bishop for the Falkland Islands.

== History ==
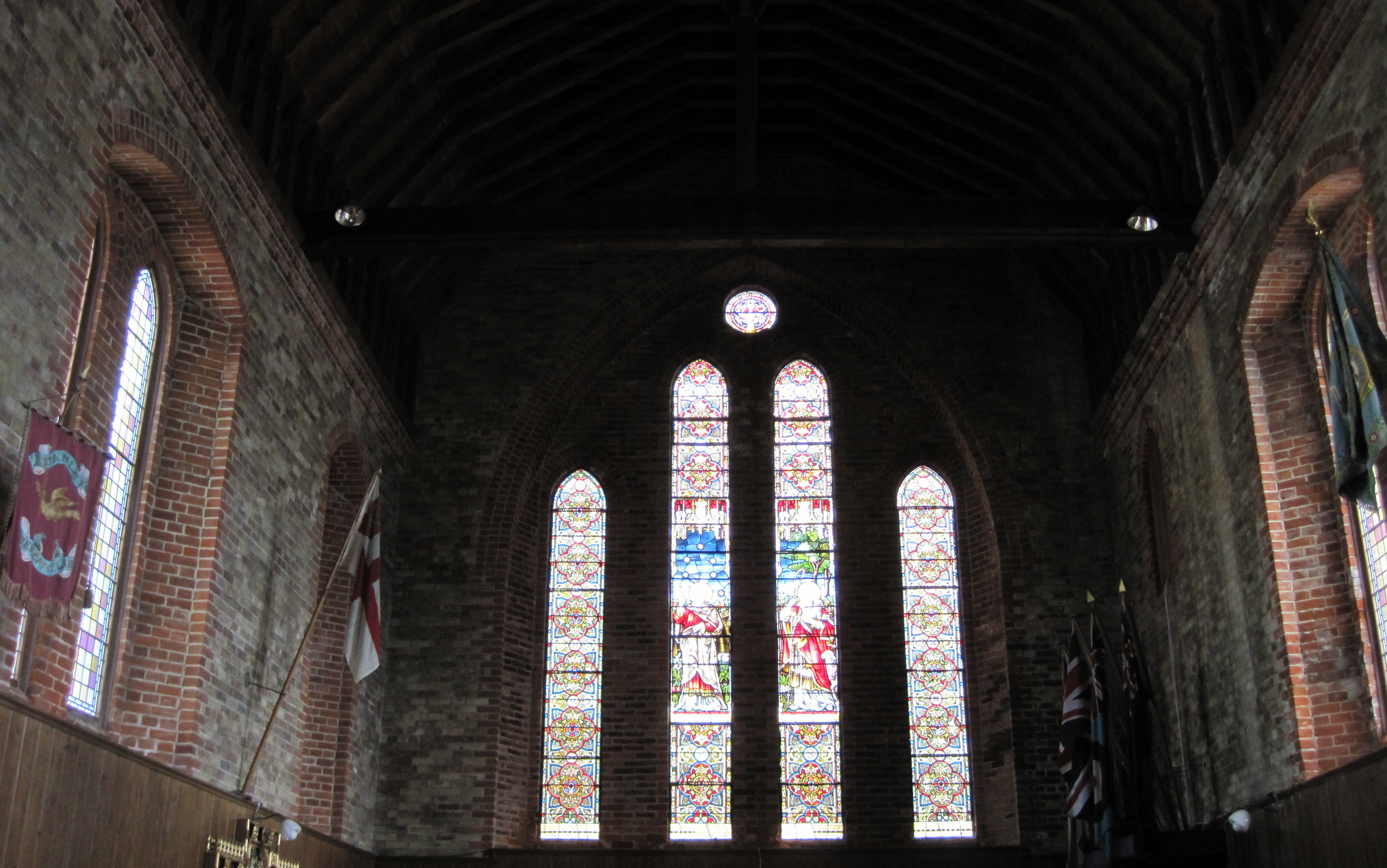
Cathedral windows from inside

The cathedral on Ross Road is built on the site of Holy Trinity Church, which was destroyed by a peat slip that destroyed part of Stanley in 1886. The new building was designed by Sir Arthur Blomfield and built in 1890–1892 from the local stone and brick. It incorporates a tower with a ring of five bells, 19th- and 20th-century stained glass windows, and a two-manual pipe organ built in Ireland. Bishop Waite Stirling consecrated the new cathedral on 21 February 1892.

The cathedral is in possession of the Garter banner of Lord Shackleton, which hung in St George's Chapel, Windsor Castle, during his lifetime. On the south wall of the cathedral is a White Ensign flown during the Battle of the River Plate by HMS Achilles. A wooden plaque below the flag has the inscription: "One of the ensigns worn by HMS Achilles at the Battle of the River Plate 13th December 1939". In the front of the building is a whalebone arch monument, made from the jaws of two blue whales, erected in 1933 to commemorate the centenary of British rule in the Falkland Islands.

Special services are held throughout the year at the cathedral, including those commemorating Liberation Day on 14 June, marking the conclusion of the Falklands War in 1982; Remembrance Sunday on the Sunday closest to 11 November, marking the Armistice of 11 November 1918; and Battle Day on 8 December, marking the Battle of the Falkland Islands in 1914. Church parades are also held on each of these days, and on the King's birthday (14th November).

The extent of the Stanley constituency of the Legislative Assembly is determined from the cathedral, being all areas of the islands within a 3.5 mi (5.6 km) radius of the spire.

== See also ==
- List of cathedrals in the United Kingdom
- Falkland Islands Magazine
