= Harold Rodgers =

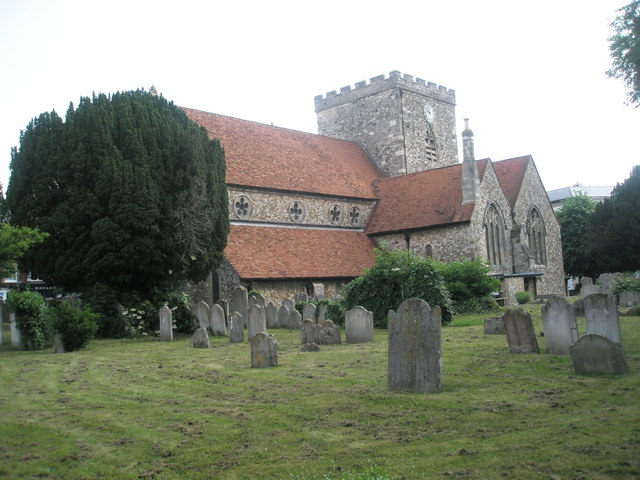
St Faith's, Havant

Rt Rev Harold Nickinson Rodgers (6 July 1881 – 22 June 1947) was the third Anglican Bishop of Sherborne in the modern era.

Educated at Corpus Christi College, Cambridge, he was ordained in 1910 and his ministry began with a curacy at St Jude's, Southsea; after which he was Vicar of Havant (and latterly Rural Dean). Subsequently, he served as Archdeacon of Portsmouth in 1927, Archdeacon of Dorset (1940–47) and Bishop of Sherborne (1936–47). He died in Salisbury in 1947. His Times obituary described him as "an able administrator".

Church of England titles
Preceded by Gerald Burton Allen	Bishop of Sherborne; 1936 –1947	Succeeded by John Maurice Key
