= Charles Hahn =

British priest

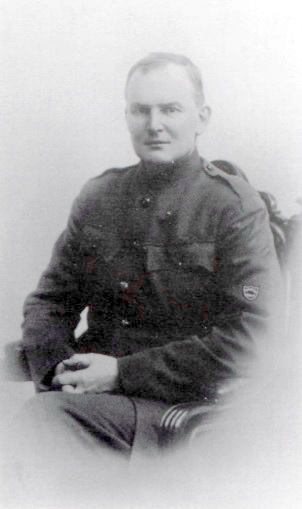
- Charles Theophilus Hahn, in a Church Army uniform, 1918
- Born: 1 March 1870; Wandsworth, London, England
- Died: 16 September 1930 (aged 60); Covent Garden, London, England
- Education: Pembroke College, Oxford; Leeds Clergy School
- Occupation: Clergyman
- Spouse: Marion Forrester (m. 1897)

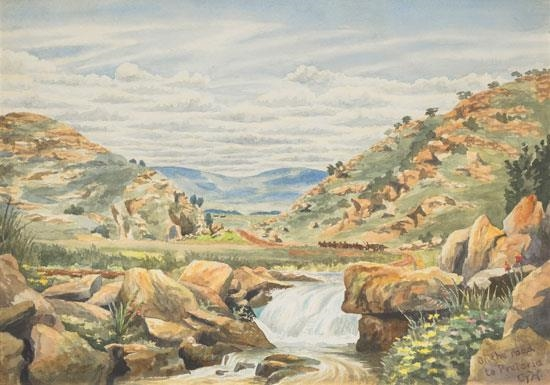
"On The Road To Pretoria"

Charles Theophilus Hahn (also surnamed Headley; 1 March 1870 Wandsworth, London – 16 September 1930 Covent Garden, London), was an Anglican priest in South London, Yorkshire and South Africa. He was an amateur artist and botanical illustrator.

== Biography ==
He was the only son of Theophilus Sigmund Hahn and Helen Maxfield Hahn (née Walters), and grew up in the village of Headley in Hampshire. He was educated at Charterhouse and Pembroke College, Oxford, acquiring a B.A. in 1892 and an M.A. in 1895. After Oxford, he embarked on a career in the ministry and trained at the Leeds Clergy School in 1892-93. He was ordained a deacon in 1893 and a priest in 1894. He served curacies in Sydenham, Bradford, Almondbury and Barnsley between 1894 and 1907 and became Vicar of Dewsbury Moor in 1907.

In 1908, he moved to the Diocese of Zululand in the Colony of Natal (Natal Province from 1910), South Africa, where he served nine years as a missionary. After a year as curate of Etalaneni, he became priest-in-charge of the Inhlwati (’Nhlwati) Mission station. He lived in Nongoma, the largest town in his territory, and spent much time on the road to other areas. He was appointed a canon of St Peter's Cathedral, Vryheid, in 1912 and Archdeacon of Eshowe in 1913. In 1916, he was appointed priest-in-charge of Empangeni while retaining his responsibilities in Inhlwati.

He went to England in 1917 to offer his services in the war effort. He was briefly Vicar of Pontefract, but a severe attack of malaria limited his effective time there. In November 1917, in response to the anti-German sentiment in the country, he changed his name from Hahn to Headley, the name of the village where he grew up. (His Hahn ancestor went to England from Germany in the 18th century and all his other forebears were English.) He went to France in March 1918 as an army chaplain and returned to England in early 1919.

He returned to South Africa later in 1919 to take up the position of editor of the Church Chronicle for the Province of South Africa. He lived in the suburb of Newlands, Cape Town, and was Sub-dean of St. George's Cathedral, Cape Town. He moved to South West Africa (Namibia since independence in 1990) in 1922. He was priest-in-charge of Keetmanshoop for two years after which he was priest-in-charge of Swakopmund with Walvis Bay for a further three years. He was also Archdeacon of Damaraland from 1924. His "parishes" were very large, and he spent much time away from home, usually travelling on unreliable trains and railway tracks.

He returned to England in 1928 to a position as Public Preacher in the Diocese of Chelmsford. He lived in the village of Hutton, Essex, where he renamed his house Newlands to remind him of his time in South Africa. He hoped to return to South Africa and went on a visit at the end of 1929. But his health deteriorated and he died in hospital in Covent Garden in September 1930.

He was an enthusiastic amateur artist, with a special interest in painting wildflowers and landscapes. In Zululand, he painted a remarkable series of about 300 watercolours of wildflowers which so impressed two botanists at the Kirstenbosch botanical gardens in Cape Town that they wrote an article about them. He read widely, especially during the long evenings in Africa. He read not only about theology and church affairs, but also about science, nature and religion. He wrote summaries of works that interested him in what he called the Book of Knowledge. He also wrote notes on nature and the weather. Together with some diaries, these journals provided the basis for the only biography of him.

He married Marion Forrester in 1897 in Sydenham. Both her parents were the children of Britons active in the port trade in Portugal. Marion shared her husband's love of travel, nature and Africa, and accompanied him in all his postings. They did not have any children. Marion died in London in 1955.
