= Bishop of the Falkland Islands =

Anglican bishop in the Falkland Islands

The Bishop of the Falkland Islands was historically a bishopric in the Church of England; as the ordinary of the Diocese of the Falkland Islands, the bishop had responsibility for chaplaincies across South America, before national metropolitical provinces were formed.

Today the Bishop of the Falkland Islands is the head of the small extra-provincial Church of the Falkland Islands, a member church of the Anglican Communion. The title is held concurrently and ex officio by the Archbishop of Canterbury, whose jurisdiction is delegated to a commissary known as the Bishop for the Falkland Islands.

== History ==
Waite Stirling, a missionary from the Patagonian Missionary Society (renamed the South American Missionary Society in 1868) was consecrated in Westminster Abbey on 21 December 1869, as the first Bishop of the Falkland Islands. Stirling had episcopal jurisdiction over "the whole of South America with the exception of British Guiana". Stirling served the people of the Falkland Islands for 30 years, later becoming Canon of Wells Cathedral.

Until well into the twentieth century, the Bishop of the Falkland Islands had episcopal authority over the whole of South America, until power shifted to the Bishop of Argentina in 1937. In 1982 as a result of the Falklands War, the Argentinian episcopal authority over the Falkland Islands was abolished; today the Rector of the Cathedral reports directly to the Archbishop of Canterbury and receives pastoral guidance from the Archbishop's Commissary, who since September 2021 has been Jonathan Clark, a former Bishop of Croydon. The Archbishop retains the title Bishop of the Falkland Islands, while his Commissary takes the title Bishop for the Falkland Islands.

== List of holders ==

=== Bishop of the Falkland Islands ===
| Dates | Name |
|---|---|
| 1869–1900 | Waite Stirling |
| 1902 | Edward Every |
| 1910 | Lawrence Blair |
| 1919 | Norman de Jersey |
| 1936 | John Weller |
| 1945 | Ivor Evans |
| 1964 | Cyril Tucker |
| 1975 | Richard Cutts |
| 1978–present | Archbishop of Canterbury |
| 1978–1982 | Archbishop's Commissary: Richard Cutts |

=== Bishop for the Falkland Islands ===
| Dates | Name | Other offices |
|---|---|---|
| 16 January 2007 to 2014 | Stephen Venner, Archbishop's Commissary | Bishop of Dover (1999–2009); Bishop to the Forces (2009–2014) |
| 9 July 2014 to August 2017 | Nigel Stock, Archbishop's Commissary | Bishop at Lambeth (2013–2017); Bishop to the Forces (2014–2017) |
| 6 September 2017 to 2021 | Tim Thornton, Archbishop's Commissary | Bishop at Lambeth and Bishop to the Forces (2017–2021) |
| 20 September 2021 to present | Jonathan Clark, Archbishop's Commissary | Bishop of Croydon (2011-2022) |

== See also ==
- Parish of the Falkland Islands
- Christ Church Cathedral (Falkland Islands)
- Norwegian Anglican Church, Grytviken
