= Richard Cutts (bishop) =

Anglican Bishop of Argentina and Eastern South America

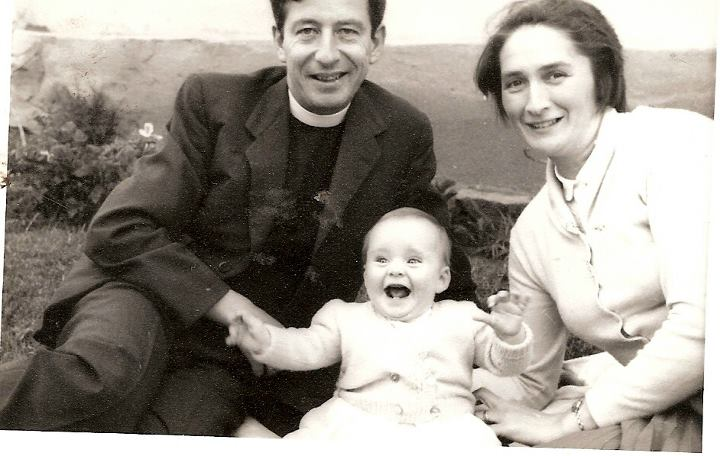
Cutts with his wife Rene and one of their children

Richard Stanley Cutts (1919-1997) was the Anglican Bishop of Argentina and Eastern South America. He acted as Episcopal Commissary for the Falkland Islands, on behalf of the Archbishop of Canterbury, from 1978 until the outbreak of the Falklands War when Episcopal oversight was transferred to the Bishop to the Forces. Cutts was born in 1919 and died in 1997 of a heart attack.

== Early life ==
Born in Argentina, and fluent in Spanish as well as English, French, and several African languages, Cutts was educated at Felsted School in Essex, England. He graduated from King's College London in 1947, being associated with Warminster. He was ordained deacon in 1951 and priest in 1952 at Guildford Cathedral while serving as curate at Godalming, 1951–1956.

== Africa ==
In 1956, Cutts went to Zululand, South Africa, serving in the missionary district of Etalaneni, Nkandla, appointed as Director of Missions there from 1957 to 1963, then at Kambula Mission, also in Zululand, from 1963 to 1965.

In the latter year he transferred to the western interior of South Africa, the Northern Cape, to take up an appointment as Director of Missions and Rector of St Mary's, Kuruman, Diocese of Kimberley and Kuruman. In 1970 to 1971 Cutts served as Archdeacon of Kuruman.

A sacristan who remembers his sojourn in the Northern Cape recalls his listening to tape cassette recordings, while traveling the long distances between towns, to keep up his Spanish. He had a wife, Rene, and four children.

Cutts was appointed Dean of Salisbury, Diocese of Mashonaland, in what was then Rhodesia (now Harare, Zimbabwe) in 1971. Here he served until 1975, in which year he was appointed Archdeacon of the City of Salisbury.

== Bishop in South America ==
During 1975 Cutts was ordained to the episcopate and succeeded Cyril Tucker as Bishop of Argentina and Eastern South America and of the Falkland Islands. The consecration was officiated by bishops Bill Flagg and David Leake who were at the time assistant bishops in Chile and Northern Argentina respectively, at the Cathedral Church of St John the Baptist, Buenos Aires on 12 October 1975.

Cutts was appointed the Archbishop of Canterbury's commissary in the Falkland Islands in 1978. In 1982, during the Falklands War, many British troops came under the episcopal oversight of the Bishop to the Forces. He retired in 1989.
