= Robert Abbott (bishop) =

British bishop (1869–1927)

Robert Abbott CBE
- Bishop of Sherborne
- Diocese: Diocese of Sherborne
- In office: 1925–1927
- Predecessor: Inaugural Appointment
- Successor: Gerald Burton Allen
- Other post: Principle of Salisbury Theological College

Personal details
- Born: 1869
- Denomination: Anglican
- Education: Marlborough College, Trinity College

Robert Crowther Abbott (1869–1927) was the inaugural Bishop of Sherborne.

Robert Crowther Abbott was born into a clerical family: his father was the Rev. A. R. Abbott, sometime Vicar of Gorleston. He was educated at Marlborough College and Trinity College, Cambridge. After 15 years as an assistant master (and latterly chaplain) at his old school he was appointed principal of Salisbury Theological College in 1907. After incumbencies at Great St Mary's with St Michael's, Cambridge, Holy Trinity, Weymouth, Dorset and St Mary the Virgin, Gillingham, Dorset he was elevated to the episcopate in 1925, but ill health forced his resignation only two years later.

== Notes ==
Church of England titles
Preceded by Inaugural appointment	Bishop of Sherborne; 1925–1927	Succeeded by Gerald Burton Allen
