= Nigel Stock (bishop) =

British Anglican bishop

The Right Reverend Nigel Stock
- Bishop at Lambeth
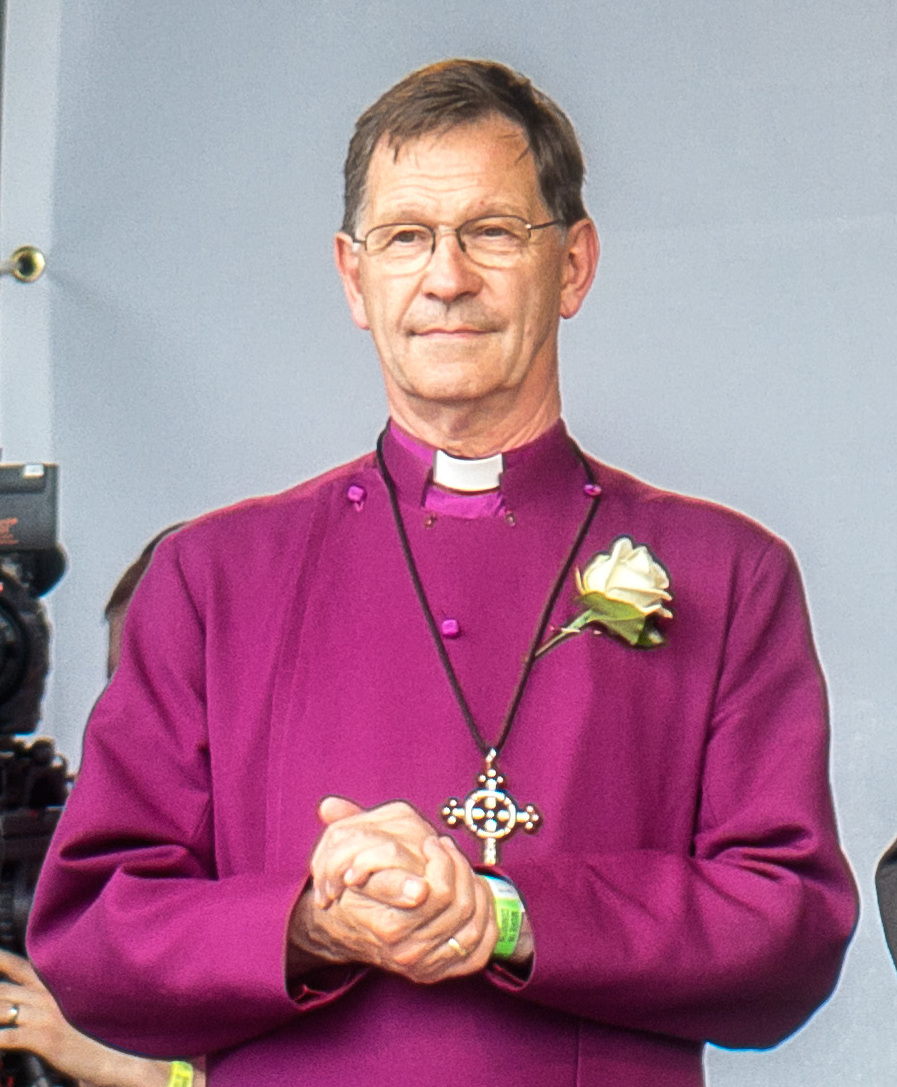
- Stock in 2016
- Church: Church of England
- In office: 2013 – 2017
- Predecessor: vacant
- Successor: Tim Thornton
- Other posts: Bishop of Stockport (Diocese of Chester; 2000–2007); Bishop of St Edmundsbury and Ipswich (2007–2013); Bishop to the Forces and Bishop for the Falkland Islands (2014 – 2017)

Orders
- Ordination: 1976 (deacon); 1977 (priest) by John Habgood
- Consecration: 2000

Personal details
- Born: 29 January 1950 (age 76)
- Denomination: Anglican
- Residence: Lambeth Palace
- Children: three
- Education: St Cuthbert's Society, Durham

Member of the House of Lords
- Lord Spiritual
- Bishop of St Edmundsbury and Ipswich; 8 March 2011 – 21 October 2013

William Nigel Stock (born 29 January 1950) is a British Anglican bishop. From 2013 until his 2017 retirement, he was Bishop at Lambeth, Bishop to the Forces and Bishop for the Falkland Islands; from 2007 to 2013 he was Bishop of St Edmundsbury and Ipswich.

== Early life and education ==
Stock was born on 29 January 1950. He was educated at Durham School, St Cuthbert's Society, Durham University and studied for ordination at Ripon College Cuddesdon.

== Ordained ministry ==
He was made a deacon at Petertide 1976 (27 June), and ordained a priest the Petertide following (26 June 1977), both times by John Habgood, Bishop of Durham, at Durham Cathedral. From 1976 to 1979, he was a curate at St Peter's Church, Stockton in the Diocese of Durham.

From 1979 to 1984, he was priest-in-charge of St Peter's in Taraka in the Diocese of Aipo Rongo, Papua New Guinea. From 1985 to 1991, he was vicar of St Mark's Shiremoor in the Diocese of Newcastle; moving to become Team Rector of North Shields from 1991 to 1998. He was appointed Commissary for the Archbishop of Papua New Guinea in 1986. He was also Rural Dean of Tynemouth from 1992 to 1998 and an honorary canon of Newcastle Cathedral from 1997 to 1998. He was a canon residentiary of Durham Cathedral from 1998 to 2000 and also Chaplain of Grey College, Durham in 1999 and 2000.

=== Episcopal ministry ===
He became Bishop of Stockport in the Diocese of Chester in 2000.

Stock became Bishop of St Edmundsbury and Ipswich upon the confirmation on 22 October 2007 of his canonical election to that See, and entered the House of Lords as a Lord Spiritual in March 2011.

It was announced on 25 June 2013 that Stock would resign his see to become Bishop at Lambeth, the right-hand bishop to Justin Welby, Archbishop of Canterbury at Lambeth Palace. Stock was commissioned as Bishop to the Forces and Bishop for the Falkland Islands by Welby on 9 July 2014 at Lambeth Palace.

On 8 March 2017, it was announced that Stock was to retire during August 2017.

== Personal life ==
Stock is married and has three children.

== Styles ==
- The Reverend Nigel Stock (1975–1997)
- The Reverend Canon Nigel Stock (1997–2000)
- The Right Reverend Nigel Stock (2000–present)

Church of England titles
Preceded by Geoffrey Turner	Bishop of Stockport; 2000–2007	Succeeded by Robert Atwell
Preceded by Richard Lewis	Bishop of St Edmundsbury and Ipswich; 2007–2013	Succeeded by Martin Seeley (Acting, 2013–2015: David Thomson)
Vacant Title last held by Richard Llewellin	Bishop at Lambeth; 2013 – 2017	Succeeded by Tim Thornton
Preceded by Stephen Venner	Bishop to the Forces; Bishop for the Falkland Islands; 2014 – 2017	Succeeded by Tim Thornton
