= John Kirkham (bishop) =

British Anglican bishop (1935–2019)

The Right Reverend John Kirkham ChStJ
- Bishop of Sherborne
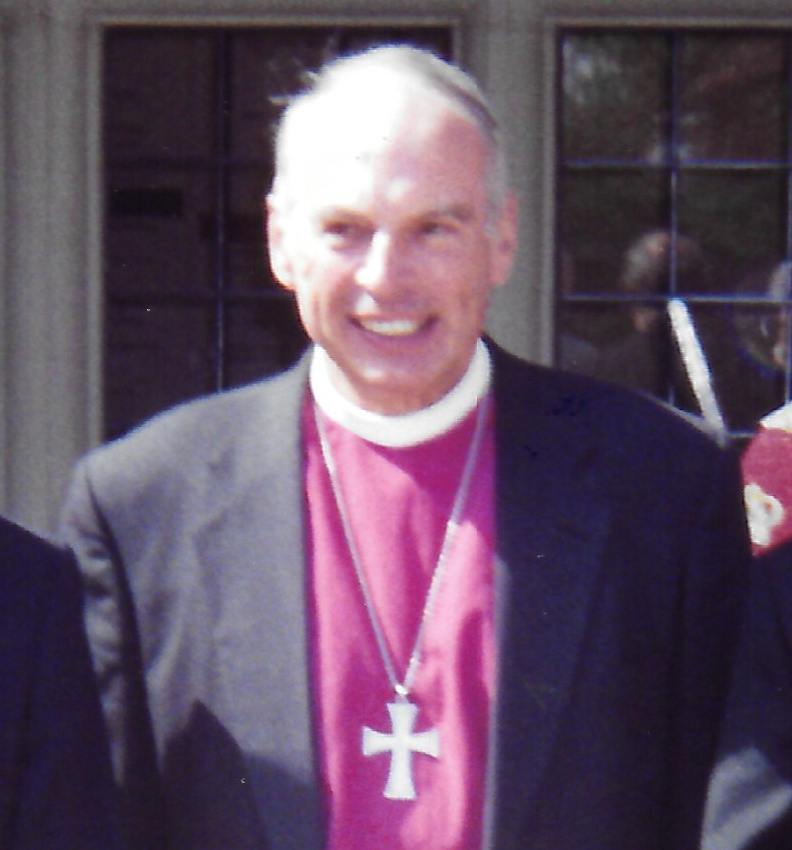
- Bishop Kirkham in 1995
- Diocese: Diocese of Salisbury
- In office: 1976–2001
- Predecessor: Victor Pike
- Successor: Tim Thornton
- Other posts: Honorary assistant bishop in Salisbury (2001–2019); Area bishop of Sherborne (1981–2001); Bishop to the Forces (1992–2001)

Orders
- Ordination: 1962 (deacon); 1963 (priest)
- Consecration: 1976

Personal details
- Born: 20 September 1935
- Died: 10 October 2019 (aged 84)
- Denomination: Anglican
- Parents: Rev Canon Charles & Doreen
- Spouse: Hester (m. 1986)
- Education: Trinity College, Cambridge

John Dudley Galtrey Kirkham ChStJ (20 September 1935 – 10 October 2019) was a British Anglican bishop. He was the Bishop of Sherborne in the last quarter of the 20th century and the first area bishop under the 1981–2009 area scheme.

== Early life and education ==
Kirkham was born on 20 September 1935. He was educated at Lancing College, a private school in West Sussex. Between 1954 and 1956, after finishing school, he completed his military service with the Royal Hampshire Regiment and King's African Rifles. He then studied at Trinity College, Cambridge from 1956 to 1959, and at the theological college Westcott House, Cambridge from 1960 to 1962.

== Ordained ministry ==
Kirkham was made a deacon at Michaelmas 1962 (30 September) at St Mary's, Woodbridge and ordained a priest the Michaelmas following (29 September 1963) at St Mary-le-Tower, Ipswich — both times by Arthur Morris, Bishop of St Edmundsbury and Ipswich. His ministry began with a curacy at St Mary-le-Tower, Ipswich, after which he was Chaplain to Launcelot Fleming, Bishop of Norwich. From 1970 to 1972, he was an assistant priest at St Martin-in-the-Fields and St Margaret's, Westminster. Finally, before his appointment to the episcopate, he was Director of Ordinands in the Diocese of Canterbury and Domestic Chaplain to Archbishop of Canterbury.

He was consecrated a bishop on 30 November 1976, by Donald Coggan, Archbishop of Canterbury, at Canterbury Cathedral. From 1976 until his retirement in 2001, he served as Bishop of Sherborne, a suffragan bishop in the Diocese of Salisbury. He was additionally an area bishop from 1981, and Bishop to the Forces from 1992. On 30 November 1991 he was appointed Chaplain to the Order of St John.

He died on 10 October 2019 at the age of 84.

Church of England titles
| Preceded by Victor Pike | Bishop of Sherborne; 1976–2001 | Succeeded by Tim Thornton |
| Preceded by David Smith | Bishop to the Forces; 1992–2001 | Succeeded by David Conner |
