= Affirming Catholicism =

Anglican Christian movement

Affirming Catholicism, sometimes referred to as AffCath, is a movement of Christians in the Anglican Communion who promote the ordination of women and other progressive ideas. It operates in several provinces of the Anglican Communion, including the United Kingdom, Ireland, Canada and the United States. In the US the movement is known as Affirming Anglican Catholicism (AAC).

The movement represents a liberal strand of Anglo-Catholicism and is particularly noted for holding that Anglo-Catholic belief and practice is compatible with the ordination of women. It also generally supports ordination into the threefold ministry (bishops, priests, deacons) regardless of gender or sexual orientation.

The movement was formalised on 9 June 1990 at St Alban's Church, Holborn, in London by a number of Anglo-Catholic clergy in the Diocese of London who had been marginalised within, or expelled from, existing Anglo-Catholic groups because of their support for women's ordination to the priesthood. It developed a theological stance which was staunchly liberal in matters of inclusivity but traditionally Catholic in matters of liturgy and the centrality and theology of the sacraments whilst believing that traditional restrictions on who may receive them should be re-examined.

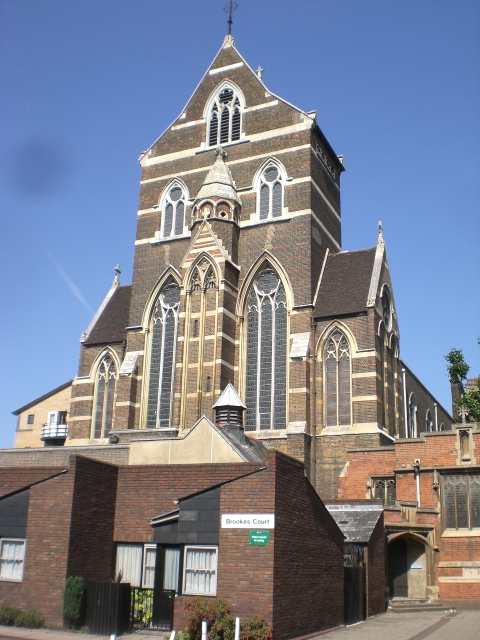
St Alban's Church, Holborn, London

In North America, AAC has ties with the Society of Catholic Priests; in the UK, AffCath is a partner organisation of Inclusive Church.

The term also occasionally refers to theologically progressive currents within Old Catholicism such as in the Union of Utrecht or the Philippine Independent Church.

== Membership and support ==
Prominent supporters include Rowan Williams, former archbishop of Canterbury; as well as Jeffrey John, former Dean of St Albans and former bishop suffragan-designate of Reading; both of whom have served on the executive committee of British and Irish Affirming Catholicism. In North America, bishops involved in AAC include Frank Griswold, former presiding bishop of the Episcopal Church; Andrew Hutchison, former primate of the Anglican Church of Canada; and Victoria Matthews, a bishop in Canada and New Zealand.

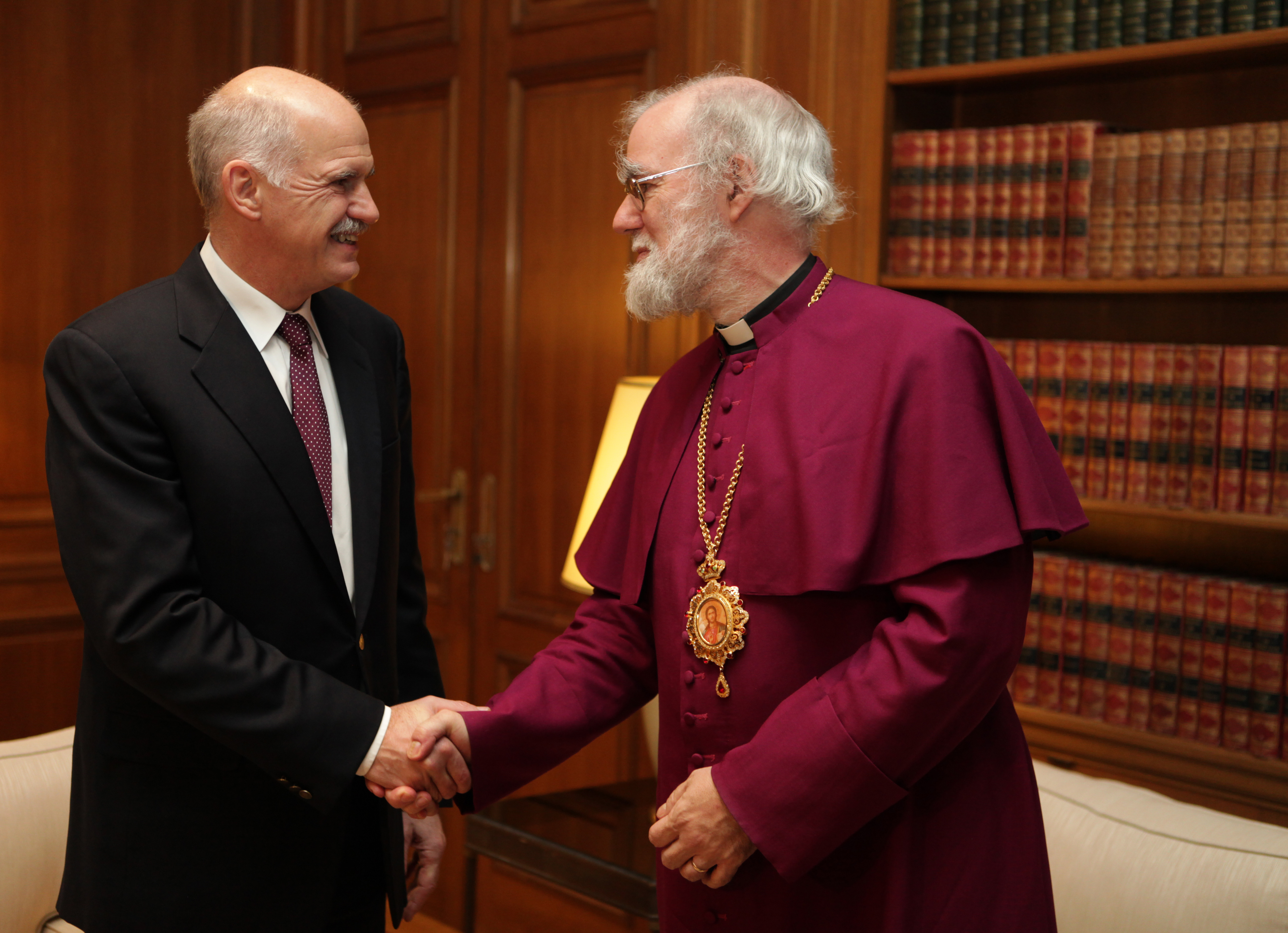
Archbishop of Canterbury Rowan Williams meeting Greek prime minister George Papandreou, 2010

=== Presidents ===
The president of Affirming Catholicism is a bishop who acts as a figurehead for the movement.

- ?–2011: David Stancliffe, Bishop of Salisbury
- 2011–2014: Michael Perham, Bishop of Gloucester
- 2015–present: Stephen Cottrell, Archbishop of York

=== Chairpersons ===
Affirming Catholicism is governed by a board of directors and headed by a chairperson.

- 1996 to ? John B. Gaskell
- 2004–2007: Richard Jenkins
- 2008–2012: Jonathan Clark
- 2012–2018: Rosemarie Mallett
- 2018–2024: Hannah Cleugh
- 2024–present: Matthew Parkes

== See also ==
- Acts of Supremacy
- English Reformation
- Dissolution of the Monasteries
- Ritualism in the Church of England
- Apostolicae curae
- Forward in Faith
- Open Orthodoxy, a similar movement in Orthodox Judaism
- Independent Catholicism
