= Victor Pike =

The Right Reverend Victor Pike CB CBE
- Born: Victor Joseph Pike; 1 July 1907; Thurles, Ireland
- Died: 25 February 1986 (aged 78); Salisbury, England
- University: Trinity College, Dublin

Rugby union career
- Position: Hooker
Senior career
Years	Team	Apps	(Points)
- Lansdowne
–	Barbarian F.C.		
International career
Years	Team	Apps	(Points)
1931-1934	Ireland	13	(3)

Victor Joseph Pike, CB, CBE (1 July 1907 – 25 February 1986) was the Anglican Bishop of Sherborne in the third quarter of the 20th century. Pike was also an international rugby union player and represented Ireland in thirteen matches.

== Personal history ==
Pike was born in Thurles, North Tipperary in 1907. The son of clergyman William Pike and Florence Surridge, he was one of 11 children. Educated at Trinity College, Dublin and ordained in 1930 his ministry began with a curacy at Dundrum, Dublin after which he began a long spell as a Chaplain in the British Army, rising eventually to become Chaplain-General. After his death a trust was set up to assist the sons and daughters of the clergy.

He married Dorothea Elizabeth Frend, and they had three children, Caroline (b. 1940), Jane (b. 1942) and Simon (b. 1948). In 1966, Caroline married Simon Alexander Bowes-Lyon, first cousin to Elizabeth II.

== Rugby career ==
Pike came from a sporting family, four of his brothers played rugby union for Lansdowne. His older brother Theodore was the most notable, having represented Ireland as a prop on eight occasions between 1927 and 1928. Pike joined Lansdowne during the 1930/31 season and gained his first international cap, against England, on 14 February 1931. Ireland won narrowly, and Pike retained his place as hooker for the rest of the 1931 Five Nations Championship, a win over Scotland but a loss to tournament winners Wales. In the Scotland match, Pike scored his only international points with a try.

Pike represented Ireland a total of 13 times, all consecutive. He faced the 1931 touring South Africa team, and then played in all nine matches of the 1932, 1933 and 1934 Home Nations Championships. During the 1932/33 season, Pike was chosen to play for invitational touring team, the Barbarians.

== Notes ==
Church of England titles
Preceded by John Maurice Key	Bishop of Sherborne; 1960 –1976	Succeeded by John Dudley Galtrey Kirkham
