= Gerald Allen =

British scholar, priest and bishop

The Right Reverend Gerald Allen
- Bishop of Dorchester
- Allen in c1927-36
- Diocese: Diocese of Oxford
- In office: 1939–1952 (ret.)
- Predecessor: himself (as Assistant Bishop of Oxford)
- Successor: Kenneth Riches
- Other posts: Bishop of Sherborne (1928–1936); Assistant Bishop of Oxford (1936–1939); Archdeacon of Oxford and Canon of Christ Church (1936–1952)

Orders
- Ordination: 1908 (deacon)
- Consecration: 1928

Personal details
- Born: 1885
- Died: 1956 (aged 70–71)
- Denomination: Anglican
- Education: Wadham College, Oxford

Gerald Burton Allen (1885–1956) was a British scholar and a Church of England priest and bishop.

== Life ==
Allen was born into a clerical family, being the eldest son of The Reverend T.K. Allen, sometime Vicar of Weyhill. He was educated at Cheltenham College, later serving as a member of the college council (1923–51) and president of the college (1939–51). He was a scholar of Wadham College, Oxford, earning first-class honours in the Final Honour School of Theology in 1908, and in 1910 being elected Denyer and Johnson Theological Scholar and receiving the Ellerton Essay Prize. He studied briefly at Wells Theological College in 1908 and was ordained deacon the same year, when he had just satisfied the canonical requirement for candidates for ordination to have attained twenty-three years of age. Both his youth and the brevity of his training were quite normal at the time.

His first appointment was as Chaplain to Wadham (1908–10) and he was ordained priest in 1909. From 1910 until 1920 he was Fellow, Dean, and Chaplain of Pembroke College (Honorary Fellow 1934). He was Temporary Chaplain to the Forces 1917-18 and Chaplain to the Royal Air Force 1918–19. He had previously served in the Great War with the YMCA. As a TCF, he was based at Rugeley camp and, when he transferred into the RAF, he was posted to an Aerial Gunnery School at Turnberry in Ayrshire In 1920 he returned to Oxford as Senior Proctor (1920–21) and Principal of St Edmund Hall (1920–28; Honorary Fellow 1942), assuming office at the age of just thirty-five. From 1923 until 1928 he was a member of the Hebdomadal Council of the University of Oxford.

He was consecrated a bishop shortly before 11 May 1928, at Lambeth Palace chapel. From 1928 until 1936 he was the second Bishop of Sherborne (a suffragan bishop in the Diocese of Salisbury). He returned to Oxford in 1936, where he was Archdeacon of Oxford and Canon of Christ Church until 1952. He was also Assistant Bishop of Oxford until 1939, when the suffragan See of Dorchester was created for him, and to make permanent the assistance he provided the Bishop diocesan. The suffragan See was erected by Order-in-Council (under the Suffragans Nomination Act 1888) on 2 February 1939 and Allen was nominated to it by Letters Patent dated 27 February.

Because of his scholarly qualifications, he was seriously considered for several diocesan bishoprics in England, including Guildford in 1934, Portsmouth in 1941 and Gloucester in 1945. The reasons why he was unsuccessful are summarised by the Prime Minister's secretary, Anthony Bevir, in his advice to Winston Churchill, the key figure in the appointments process, regarding Portsmouth.

"...Bishop of Dorchester (Puffles Allen), though intelligent, is not a dignified figure...there is a stepmother who would do better justice to Barchester than to Portsmouth..."

It appears that Allen's cherubic appearance and his tactless stepmother damaged his chances of more senior appointments

According to the Times, man with the widest sympathies and the most excellent personal relations, he resigned in 1952 and died in retirement at Cheltenham four years later.

== Sources ==
- The Times (1910) "University Intelligence: The University Endowment Fund Thursday", 19 May (39276), p. 3 (col. 'C')
- The Times (1936) "Ecclesiastical News", 21 August (47459), p. 13 (col. 'G')
- The Times (1951) "St Edmund Hall, Oxford: Institution of New Principal", 13 October (52131), p. 8 (col. 'F')
- The Times (1956) "Dr. G. B. Allen Former Bishop of Dorchester", 29 March (53492), p. 14 (col. 'D')
- Who was Who (1991) Who was who. A cumulated index 1897-1990, CD-ROM, London : A & C Black, ISBN 0-7136-3457-X

Church of England titles
Preceded by Robert Abbott	Bishop of Sherborne; 1928 – 1936	Succeeded by Maurice Key
Preceded by himself as Assistant Bishop of Oxford	Bishop of Dorchester; 1939 – 1952	Succeeded by Kenneth Riches
