= Bishop of Sherborne =

Episcopal title

The Bishop of Sherborne is an episcopal title which takes its name from the market town of Sherborne in Dorset, England. The see of Sherborne was established in around 705 by St Aldhelm, the Abbot of Malmesbury. This see was the mother diocese of the greater part of southwestern England in Saxon times, but after the Norman Conquest was incorporated into the new Diocese of Salisbury. The title Bishop of Sherborne is now used by the Church of England for a suffragan bishop in the Diocese of Salisbury.

The title Bishop of Sherborne was revived by the Church of England as a suffragan bishopric in the Diocese of Salisbury; that See was erected under the Suffragans Nomination Act 1888 by Order in Council dated 6 February 1925. From 1981 to 2009, the suffragan Bishop of Sherborne was responsible as area bishop for those parishes in Dorset and Devon belonging to the diocese. Since 2009, the suffragan Bishop of Sherborne, along with the suffragan Bishop of Ramsbury, has assisted the diocesan Bishop of Salisbury in overseeing the whole of the diocese.

The post became vacant in 2015 on the resignation of Graham Kings, who had been consecrated in a special service at Westminster Abbey on 24 June 2009 by Rowan Williams, Archbishop of Canterbury.

The present incumbent is the Right Reverend Karen Gorham, the first woman to have held the position. She was born in 1964 and was educated at Mayflower High School, a state school in Billericay, Essex. She holds a B.A. degree from the University of Bristol and did her theological training for the ministry at Trinity College, Bristol. Before being ordained she held administrative posts with the Business and Technology Education Council and with the Royal Society of Arts. From 1995 to 1999 she served as a curate in the parish of Northallerton with Kirby Sigston in the Diocese of York, and was ordained priest in 1996. In 1999 she became Priest-in-Charge of St Paul's Church, Maidstone, in the Diocese of Canterbury. She was the Archdeacon of Buckingham from 2007 onwards, stepping down as archdeacon on 19 January 2016 in preparation for her consecration as bishop. She has served on the General Synod of the Church of England for twelve years.

Karen Gorham was consecrated as bishop on 24 February 2016 at Westminster Abbey by the Archbishop of Canterbury, Justin Welby, and officially welcomed to the diocese on 6 March 2016 at Sherborne Abbey. Welcoming her, the Very Revd June Osborne, Dean of Salisbury, stated: "The last year has been a significant year for women in the ministry of the Church of England and this is a historic moment for the Diocese of Salisbury as its welcomes its first woman bishop."

Bishops of Sherborne
From	Until	Incumbent	Notes
1925	1927	Robert Abbott	
1928	1936	Gerald Allen	Translated to Dorchester.
1936	1947	Harold Rodgers	
1947	1960	Maurice Key	Translated to Truro.
1960	1976	Victor Pike	
1976	2001	John Kirkham	First area bishop from 1981; also Bishop to the Forces (1992–2001).
2001	2009	Tim Thornton	Translated to Truro.
2009	15 July 2015	Graham Kings	Last area bishop (until end 2009). Became Mission Theologian in the Anglican Communion.
2016	present	Karen Gorham	Consecrated 24 February 2016.
