= Jonathan Clark (bishop) =

Anglican Bishop

The Right Reverend Jonathan Clark SCP
- Bishop for the Falkland Islands
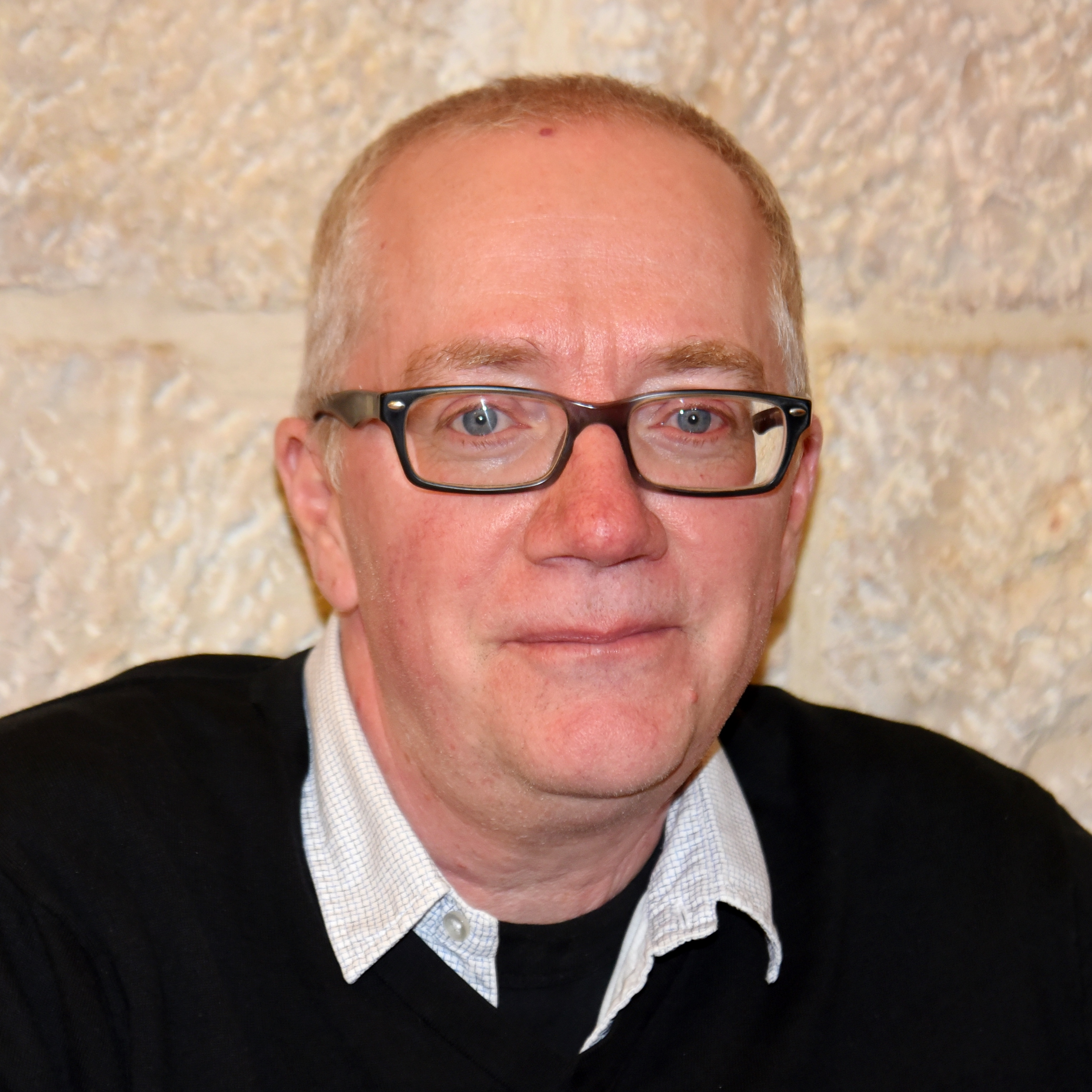
- Clark in Jerusalem, 2019
- Diocese: Parish of the Falkland Islands
- In office: 2021–present
- Other post: Bishop of Croydon (2012–2022)

Orders
- Ordination: 1988 (deacon); 1989 (priest)
- Consecration: 21 March 2012 by Rowan Williams

Personal details
- Born: 1961 (age 64–65)
- Denomination: Anglican
- Spouse: Alison
- Children: 2
- Education: Exeter University

Jonathan Clark SCP (born 1961) is a retired Anglican bishop serving as the Bishop for the Falkland Islands. He was previously area Bishop of Croydon in the Church of England Diocese of Southwark, 2012–2022. An Anglo-Catholic, he was rector general of the Society of Catholic Priests from 2005 to 2008 and chair of Affirming Catholicism from 2008 to 2012

== Early life ==
Clark was born in 1961. He was educated at Alleyn's School, then a direct grant grammar school in Dulwich, London, from 1972 to 1979. He studied English literature at Exeter University, graduating with a Bachelor of Arts (BA) degree in 1983. From 1984 to 1988, he studied theology at Trinity College, Bristol, an Evangelical Anglican theological college, during which he completed a Diploma of Higher Education (DipHE).

He continued his university studies after ordination. He completed a Master of Letters (MLitt) degree in theology in 1990. His thesis was titled "Narrational technique in the gospel according to Matthew". He completed a Master of Arts (MA) degree in adult education through the Open University and the University of Southampton.

== Ordained ministry ==
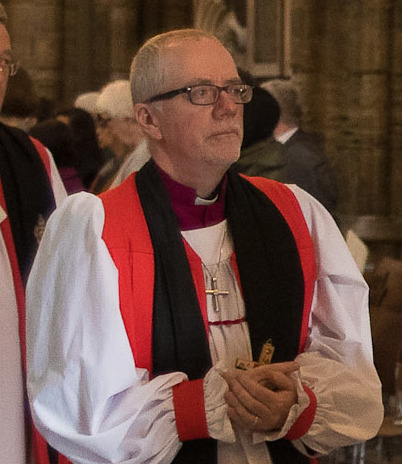
Clark at Westminster Abbey in 2017

Clark was ordained in the Church of England as a deacon in 1988 and as a priest in 1989. After a curacy at Stanwix he was a chaplain at Bristol University then Director of Studies of the Southern Theological Education and Training Scheme. From 1997 to 2002 he was a chaplain at the University of North London and then the rector of Stoke Newington until his episcopal appointment.

He served as rector general of the Society of Catholic Priests from 2005 to 2008. He served as chair of Affirming Catholicism from 2008 to 2012.

=== Episcopal ministry ===
On 21 March 2012, Clark was consecrated a bishop at Southwark Cathedral by Rowan Williams. He began his duties as Bishop of Croydon on 17 May 2012. On 8 September 2021, Clark announced that he would retire as Bishop of Croydon on 21 March 2022.

On 20 September 2021, he was commissioned as Bishop for the Falkland Islands. He has additionally been an honorary assistant bishop in the Diocese of Lichfield since 2022, and holds permission to officiate in that diocese.

== Personal life ==
Clark is married to Alison and they have two children. Ellen Clark-King, Dean of King's College London, is his sister. In retirement Clark and his wife live on Orkney.

== Styles ==
For further information on forms of address ("styles") traditionally given to clergy of the Church of England, see Crockford's Clerical Directory and forms of address in the United Kingdom.
Regardless of their formal style(s), a person may choose which styles to use or not use.

- The Reverend Jonathan Clark (1989–2012)
- The Right Reverend Jonathan Clark (personal: 2012–present)
- The Right Reverend The Bishop of Croydon (official: 2012–2022)

Church of England titles
Preceded by Nick Baines	Bishop of Croydon; 2012–2022	TBA
