= John Weller (bishop) =

The Right Reverend John Reginald Weller (6 October 1880 – 26 October 1969) was an Anglican priest. He was the Bishop of the Falkland Islands from 1934 to 1937, and of Argentina and Eastern South America from 1937 to 1946.

He was educated at Bedford School and Selwyn College, Cambridge; and, after an earlier career as a tea planter, was ordained in 1914. He served in Delhi, Waziristan, Mesopotamia and Quetta (after 1917 as a military chaplain). He was the Superintendent of the Missions to Seamen in Melbourne and then Merseyside before his elevation to the episcopate. Returning to England, he was assistant bishop of Southwell (1946–1952), Vicar of Edwalton (1946–1949) and Rector of Holme Pierrepont (1951–1958).
