= Hugh Nelson (bishop) =

British Anglican priest

The Right Reverend Hugh Nelson
- Bishop of Worcester
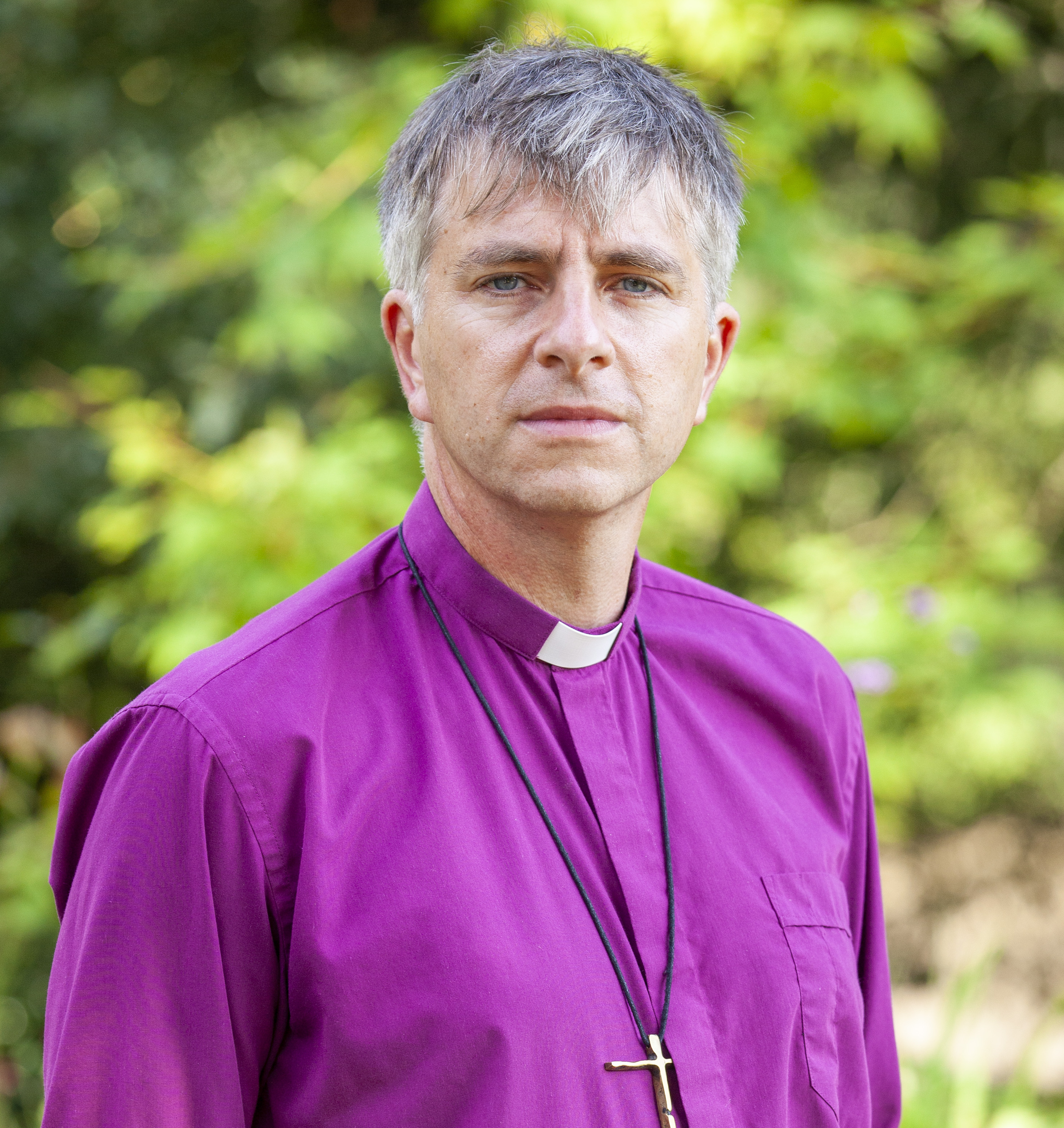
- Church: Church of England
- Province: Canterbury
- Diocese: Worcester
- In office: 2026 – present
- Predecessor: John Inge
- Other posts: Bishop to the Forces (September 2021–present); Bishop of St Germans (2020–2026)

Orders
- Consecration: 15 July 2020 by Sarah Mullally

Personal details
- Born: 1972 (age 53–54)
- Denomination: Anglican
- Education: Worcester College, Oxford; Ripon College Cuddesdon

Hugh Edmund Nelson (born 1972) is a British Anglican bishop and former charity worker. Since 2026 he has been Bishop of Worcester, the head of the Diocese of Worcester. He is also Bishop to the Forces.

== Early life and education ==
Nelson was born in 1972. He studied theology at Worcester College, Oxford, graduating with a Bachelor of Arts (BA) degree in 1994. Before starting ministry in the Church of England, he spent 13 years working at L'Arche London, a charity supporting adults with learning disabilities. He trained for ordination at Ripon College Cuddesdon from 2007 to 2009.

== Ordained ministry ==
Nelson was ordained in the Church of England as a deacon in 2009 and as a priest in 2010. From 2009 to 2012, he served his curacy across multiple parishes in the Diocese of Canterbury. From 2012 to 2020 he was Vicar of Goudhurst and Kilndown in the Diocese of Canterbury.

His appointment to St Germans was announced in January 2020; he was due be consecrated as a bishop in June 2020, but this was postponed due to the coronavirus epidemic. He was consecrated in the Chapel of Lambeth Palace to 15 July 2020. The principal consecrator was Sarah Mullally, Bishop of London, rather than the Archbishop of Canterbury: this was the first time a female bishop had led a consecration service in the Church of England. Since 20 September 2021, he has also been Bishop to the Forces. From September 2023 to May 2025, he was acting diocesan bishop of the Diocese of Truro.

On 28 July 2025, it was announced that Nelson was to be the next Bishop of Worcester, the diocesan bishop of the Diocese of Worcester. He was enthroned at Worcester Cathedral as the 114th Bishop of Worcester on 17 January 2026.

== Personal life ==
Nelson is married to Lizzie. Together they have four children.
