= Extra-provincial Anglican churches =

Group of semi-independent churches

The extra-provincial Anglican churches are a group of small, semi-independent church entities within the Anglican Communion. Unlike the larger member churches of the Communion, extra-provincial churches are not part of an ecclesiastical province and are subject to the metropolitical oversight of the Archbishop of Canterbury or theoretically of another bishop (Tasmania is a case in point, see below). As of 2023 there were six extra-provincial churches. In almost every case, these churches consist of just one diocese, although the Church of Ceylon is an exception, having two.

Under the metropolitical oversight of the Archbishop of Canterbury:

- The Anglican Church of Bermuda, led by the Bishop of Bermuda
- The Church of Ceylon, Sri Lanka, led by the Bishop of Colombo
- The Parish of the Falkland Islands, led by the Bishop of the Falkland Islands (post currently held by the Archbishop of Canterbury)
- The Lusitanian Catholic Apostolic Evangelical Church (Igreja Lusitana Católica Apostólica Evangélica) in Portugal, led by the Bishop of the Lusitanian Church
- The Spanish Reformed Episcopal Church (Iglesia Española Reformada Episcopal) in Spain, led by the Bishop of the Spanish Reformed Church.

Under the metropolitical oversight of the Primate of Australia (since 1 January 1962):

- The Anglican Diocese of Tasmania, led by the Lord Bishop of Tasmania

Prior to 1962, Tasmania had been under the metropolitical oversight of the Archbishop of Canterbury.
