= Maurice Key =

British bishop (1905-1984)

(John) Maurice Key (4 June 1905 – 21 December 1984) was a British Anglican bishop. He was the Bishop of Sherborne then the Bishop of Truro in the third quarter of the 20th century.

== Biography ==
He was educated at Rossall School and Pembroke College, Cambridge, before being ordained in 1928. Beginning his ministry with a curacy at St Mary’s Portsea he was successively Vicar of Aylesbeare, Rector of Newton Abbot and finally (before his elevation to the Episcopate) Rural Dean of the Three Towns.

In 1947, he was consecrated a bishop and appointed Bishop of Sherborne, a suffragan bishop in the Diocese of Salisbury. He translated to become the Bishop of Truro, the diocesan bishop of the Diocese of Truro, and enthroned in March 1960.

Key failed to take action or to launch an investigation into Jeremy Dowling (later Dowling was convicted of sex offences against boys). A review found, "There is no doubt that there were a number of missed opportunities for the diocese of Truro to undertake its own investigations into the allegations made in 1972 against Jeremy Dowling." The review also stated, "No institution or organisation should have relied on a police criminal investigation to make judgments on the conduct of those it employs or engages with. It has its own responsibilities to judge such behaviour. These judgments are not tied to the criminal standard but to the civil standard, ie 'are events more likely than not to have happened' or 'on the balance of probabilities'."

Church of England titles
Preceded by Harold Nickinson Rodgers	Bishop of Sherborne; 1947 –1959	Succeeded by Victor Joseph Pike
Preceded by Edmund Robert Morgan	Bishop of Truro; 1960 –1973	Succeeded by Graham Douglas Leonard
