= Stephen Venner =

British bishop

The Right Reverend Stephen Venner
- Bishop of Dover
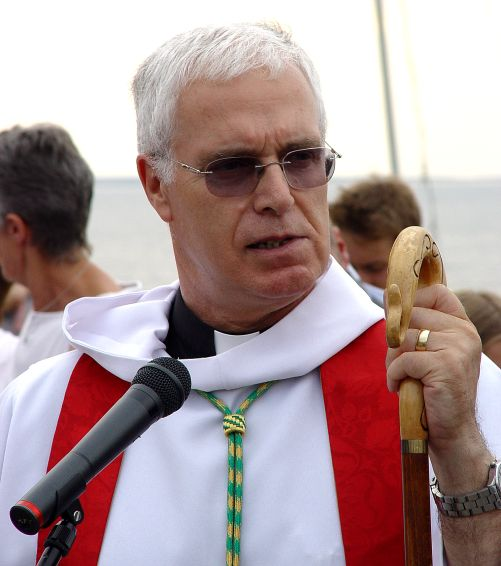
- Diocese: Canterbury
- In office: 1999 – November 2009
- Predecessor: Richard Llewellin
- Successor: Trevor Willmott
- Other posts: Bishop of Middleton (1994–1999); Bishop for the Falkland Islands (2007–2014); Bishop to the Forces (2009–2014)

Orders
- Ordination: 1968
- Consecration: 2 February 1994

Personal details
- Born: 19 June 1944 (age 82) Chatteris, Cambridgeshire, United Kingdom
- Denomination: Anglican
- Spouse: Judy
- Profession: Bishop and former teacher
- Education: University of Birmingham

Stephen Venner DL (born 19 June 1944) was Bishop of Dover (the bishop with delegated responsibility for the Diocese of Canterbury) from 1999 until 2009. He was also the Bishop for the Falkland Islands from 2007 and Bishop to the Forces from 2009 until his retirement from both posts in 2014.

== Education and career ==
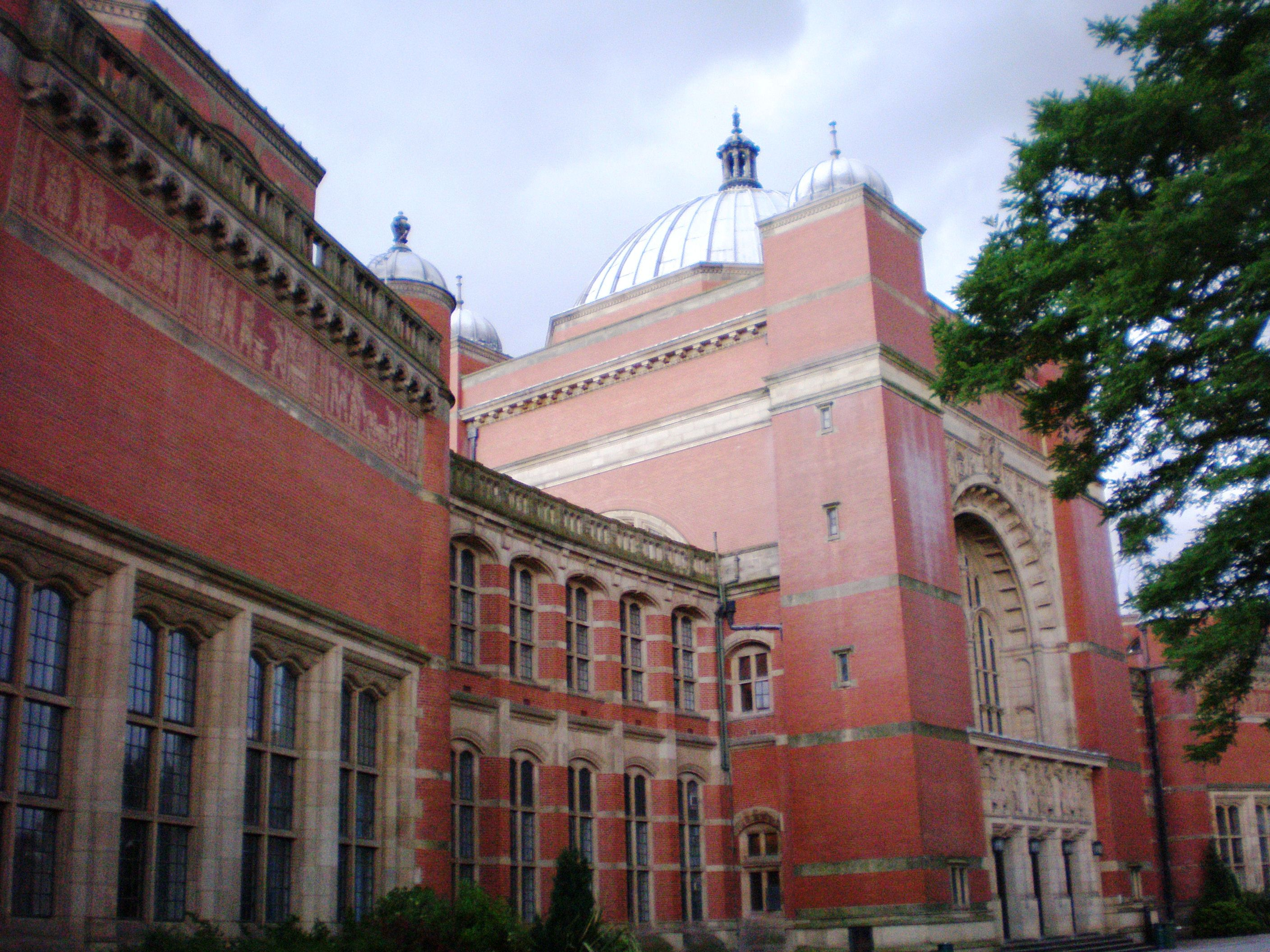
Birmingham University

Venner studied English at the University of Birmingham and is a qualified teacher. He later studied theology at St Stephen's House, Oxford and Linacre College, Oxford (since St Stephen's House did not at the time have the status of a permanent private hall), before spending 26 years as a priest across various parishes in the dioceses of Southwark and Salisbury. In 1989, Venner was appointed canon and prebendary at Salisbury Cathedral.

Venner was consecrated as a bishop by John Habgood, Archbishop of York, on 2 February 1994 at York Minster and installed as Bishop of Middleton in the Diocese of Manchester. He served in this position until 1999 when he became the Bishop of Dover in the Diocese of Canterbury. As Bishop of Dover, Venner was also, in practice, the acting diocesan bishop for the Diocese of Canterbury, acting on behalf of the Archbishop of Canterbury — this role was recognised in his additional title of "Bishop in Canterbury".

While Bishop of Dover, Venner was also appointed the Archbishop of Canterbury's "Episcopal Commissary for the Falkland Islands" or "Bishop for the Falkland Islands" on 16 January 2007 — he remains in this separate appointment despite his departure from Canterbury. In 2008, the University of Birmingham (his alma mater) awarded him his first honorary doctorate — a Doctor of Divinity degree. Venner was also the first Pro-Chancellor of Canterbury Christ Church University from 2005 (while he was Bishop in Canterbury) and, in 2010, that university bestowed an honorary doctorate (Doctor of the university) upon him.

It was announced in early 2009 that Venner would retire in November that year. It was then announced in July 2009 that Venner would take up an appointment as Bishop to the Forces (who has pastoral oversight over and responsibility for the church's work in the British Armed Forces) while retaining his additional role as Bishop for the Falklands. As of 2012, Venner is also an honorary assistant bishop in the dioceses of Rochester and in Europe.

== Taliban controversy ==
In an interview published on 14 December 2009, Venner was quoted as saying some of the methods of combat used by the Taliban in Afghanistan (potentially including those to kill British troops) are not honourable or acceptable. He also said "there’s a large number of things that the Taliban say and stand for which none of us in the West could approve, but simply to say therefore that everything they do is bad is not helping the situation. The Taliban can perhaps be admired for their conviction to their faith and their sense of loyalty to each other". After receiving criticism, Venner issued a qualifying statement, in which he repudiated any respect for Taliban tactics.

== Styles and titles ==
- The Reverend Stephen Venner (1968–1989)
- The Reverend Canon Stephen Venner (1989–1994)
- The Right Reverend Stephen Venner (1994–present)

Church of England titles
Preceded by Donald Tytler	Bishop of Middleton; 1994–1999	Succeeded by Michael Lewis
Preceded by Richard Llewellin	Bishop of Dover; 1999–2009	Succeeded by Trevor Willmott
New title	Bishop for the Falkland Islands; 2007–2014	Succeeded by Nigel Stock
Preceded by David Conner	Bishop to the Forces; 2009–2014	Succeeded by Nigel Stock
