= Norman de Jersey =

British Anglican bishop (1866–1934)

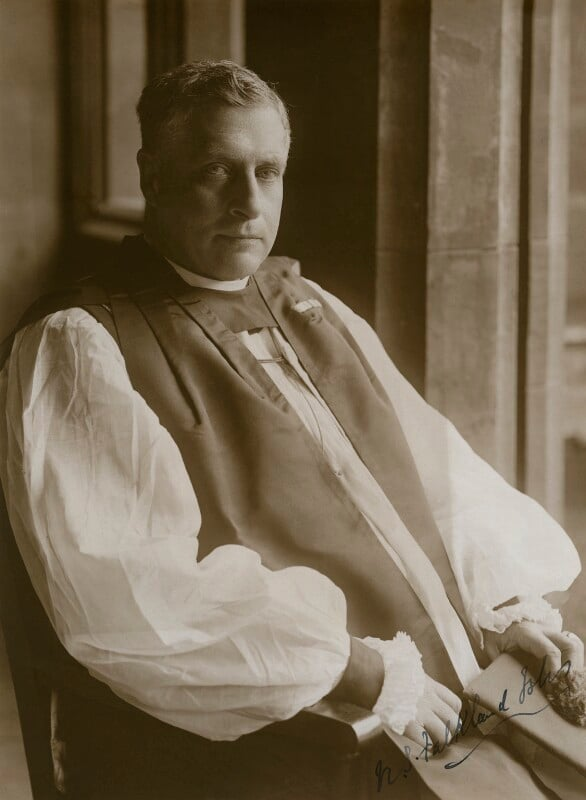
De Jersey, c. 1919–1934

Norman Stewart de Jersey, VD (1866–1934) was an Anglican priest: the Bishop of the Falkland Islands from 1919 to 1933.

He was educated at Elizabeth College, Guernsey; Marlborough and Pembroke College, Cambridge. Ordained in 1891, he served curacies at St Michael's, Bristol and St Mary's, Kilburn. He was Chaplain to the Missions to Seamen for Bristol, Avonmouth and the Channel from 1893 to 1914. He was recruited as a Temporary Chaplain to the Royal Navy the day World War I was declared, and saw action off Southwest Africa, in the Dardanelles and with the 10th Cruiser Squadron on patrol ships blocking German access to the North Sea. He was reported as being ‘Above Average’ and ‘most sympathetic and elevating’. His summons to meet the Archbishop of Canterbury in May 1919, took him by surprise. He was offered, and accepted, the post of Bishop of the Falkland Islands. He asked the Archbishop if he could tell anyone, and the response was ‘The appointment is entirely mine, you can go and shout it in Trafalgar Square if you like’. De Jersey's cathedral was at Stanley in the Falkland Islands but his see comprised the whole of western South America. The amount of travelling to remote British communities damaged his health, and he resigned in 1933 and died a few months later.
