= Ivor Evans (bishop) =

Welsh bishop in South America (1900–1962)

Daniel Ivor Evans CBE (called Ivor; (Note: While Bishop of Argentina, Evans signed himself "D. Ivor Argentina", the traditional way for serving bishops to sign: given name and See.) 5 July 1900 – 30 July 1962) was an Anglican bishop in South America in the mid 20th century.

A Welsh speaker educated at St David’s College, Lampeter, Evans served in the RNVR during World War I (1916–1918); and was made deacon on the Feast of St Thomas (21 December) 1924 and ordained priest the next Advent (20 December 1925) — both times by Edward Bevan, Bishop of Swansea and Brecon, at Brecon Cathedral. He began his career with Curacies at St John’s, Swansea (1924–1927) and St Martin’s, Roath (1927–1930).

After this he spent his entire ministry in Argentina: first as Assistant Chaplain at St John’s, Buenos Aires (then the pro-cathedral; 1930–1936) and then Chaplain at Hurlingham, Buenos Aires (1936–1938), and at Christ Church, Rio de Janeiro (1938–1946) before being appointed an Assistant Bishop in the two Dioceses of Argentina and Eastern South America, and of the Falkland Islands in 1939. He was consecrated a bishop on St Matthias' Day (24 February) 1939, by Cosmo Lang, Archbishop of Canterbury, at Westminster Abbey. He married Leone Helene Trery in 1940; in 1946, the two dioceses were merged into one Diocese of Argentina and Eastern South America with the Falkland Islands. Later that year, Evans was appointed diocesan bishop of the newly-united diocese, as Bishop in Argentina and Eastern South America with the Falkland Islands; he died in post, in Santiago, aged 62.
