= Bishop to the Forces =

Head of the Anglican church in the British Armed Forces

The Anglican church in the British Armed Forces falls under the jurisdiction of the Archbishop of Canterbury; however, for all practical purposes the function is performed by the Bishop to the Forces. His full title is "The Archbishop of Canterbury's Episcopal Representative to the Armed Forces". The Bishop to the Forces is not a military chaplain. The Bishop always sits in the Church's House of Bishops and (therefore) General Synod; from 2014 to 2021, this fact was utilised to give the Bishop at Lambeth (the Archbishop of Canterbury's episcopal chief of staff) a seat on both.

There is sometimes confusion between the (Anglican) "Bishop to the Forces" and the (Roman Catholic) "Bishop of the Forces": for this reason the latter is normally given his title in full, i.e. "The Roman Catholic Bishop of the Forces".

== List of bishops ==
Bishops to the Forces
From	Until	Incumbent	Notes
1948	1956	Cuthbert Bardsley	Also Bishop of Croydon; later became Bishop of Coventry.
1956	1966	Stanley Betts	Also Bishop of Maidstone; later became Dean of Rochester.
1966	1975	John Hughes	Also Bishop of Croydon.
1977	1984	Stuart Snell	Also Bishop of Croydon.
1985	1990	Ronald Gordon	Also Bishop at Lambeth.
1990	1992	David Smith	Also Bishop of Maidstone; later became Bishop of Bradford.
1992	2001	John Kirkham	Also Bishop of Sherborne.
2001	2009	David Conner	Also Dean of Windsor.
2009	2014	Stephen Venner	Also Bishop of Dover and Bishop for the Falkland Islands.
9 July 2014	2017	Nigel Stock	Also Bishop at Lambeth and Bishop for the Falkland Islands; retired August 2017.
6 September 2017	2021	Tim Thornton	As Bishop at Lambeth and Bishop for the Falkland Islands; commissioned 6 September 2017.
20 September 2021	present	Hugh Nelson	Also Bishop of St Germans; commissioned 20 September 2021

== See also ==
- Military archdeacon
- Royal Air Force Chaplains Branch
- Royal Army Chaplains' Department
- Royal Navy Chaplaincy Service
