= Lawrence Blair (bishop) =

Laurence Frederick Devaynes Blair (1868–1925) was an Anglican priest: a missionary bishop in South America in the first half of the twentieth century.

He was educated at Pembroke College, Cambridge and ordained in 1892. He was Curate of Portman Chapel from 1892 to 1895 when he became Rector of Chedgrave. He was Chaplain at Bellary then an Army Chaplain. He was with the Church Parochial Mission Society, from 1906 to 1910 when he became Bishop of the Falkland Islands.
