= Edward Every =

Anglican missionary bishop (1862–1941)

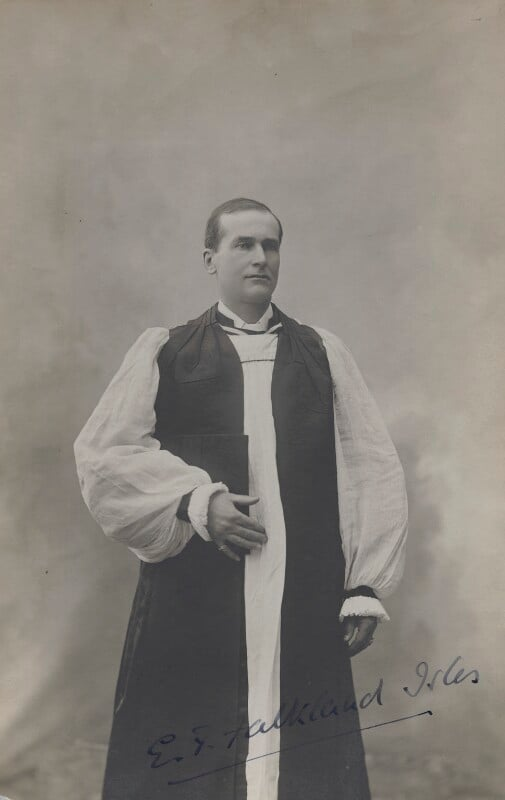
Every, c. 1902–1910

Edward Francis Every CBE (13 April 1862 – 16 January 1941) was an Anglican priest and author: a Missionary Bishop, in South America for a 35-year period during the first half of the twentieth century.

== Biography ==
He was the second son of Sir Henry Flower Every, 10th Bart, and educated at Harrow, where he played for the 1880 association football team, and Trinity College, Cambridge, where he received a Doctor of Divinity and a Master of Arts. Ordained in 1885, after a curacy in West Hartlepool he became Vicar of Seaham then St Cuthbert's, Gateshead. In 1902 he was appointed Bishop of the Falkland Islands, and he was consecrated bishop by the Archbishop of Canterbury at St Paul's Cathedral on 13 July 1902. In 1910 he became bishop of the Anglican Diocese in Argentina and Eastern South America. In 1937 he retired to England to become Rector of Egginton, and an Assistant Bishop and Honorary Canon of Derby Cathedral. On his death that diocese's bishop added to his obituary in The Times saying, "Above all he was, most obviously, one of the saints of the Most High: the trumpets will assuredly have sounded for him on the other side."
