= Etalaneni =

Etalaneni is a settlement and former missionary station in the uThungulu district of KwaZulu-Natal, South Africa.
