= Waite Stirling =

British Anglican bishop

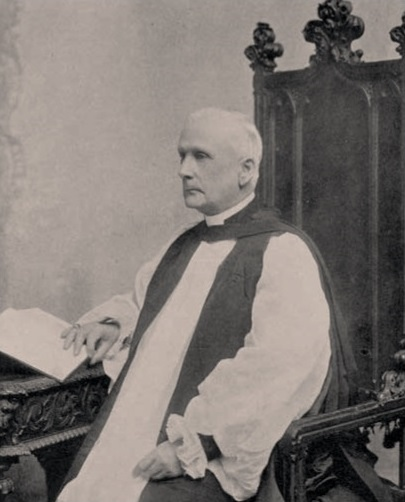
Waite Hockin Stirling, Bishop of the Falkland Islands

Waite Hockin Stirling (1829 – 19 November 1923) was a nineteenth-century missionary with the Patagonian Missionary Society (later known as the South American Missionary Society) and was the first Anglican Bishop of the Falkland Islands. He was brother-in-law to Thomas Phinn. He was also a grandnephew of Sir Thomas Stirling, 5th Baronet of Ardoch.

== Patagonian Missionary Society ==
In the mid-nineteenth century, the Patagonian Missionary Society suffered several major losses and setbacks in the project for the Yaghan people at Tierra del Fuego archipelago. In 1851 Captain Allen Gardiner and his companions at Spanish Harbour on Picton Island died of starvation. In 1859 the Yahgan massacred a group of missionaries at Wulaia, Navarino Island.

In 1854, the Society re-established its missionary base at Keppel Island in the Falkland Islands; Stirling became secretary of the mission in England. In 1861 he went to Keppel Island as the mission superintendent. From there, he re-established contacts with the Yaghan of Tierra del Fuego. In January 1869 he served as a lone missionary at Ushuaia in Tierra del Fuego.

Whilst serving at Ushuaia as "God's Lonely Sentinel", as Stirling called himself, he was summoned to London to be consecrated on 21 December 1869 in Westminster Abbey as "Bishop of the Falkland Islands." It was contemporary practice to name overseas bishoprics after one of Her Majesty's possessions. Seven consular chaplaincies in South America and several private company chaplains were placed under Stirling's jurisdiction. He spent his first few years establishing his authority over recalcitrant clergy and congregations. They resented this Episcopal "upstart" and thought they still owed allegiance to the Bishop of London, previously responsible for the supervision of overseas Colonial and Consular Chaplaincies.

The Anglican mission at Ushuaia was expanded by Thomas Bridges and George Lewis, who lived there with their families starting in 1871. Later relocated within the Tierra del Fuego archipelago, the mission was continued by other ministers until 1916.

On 14 January 1872, Bishop Stirling was assigned his "Throne and Episcopal Chair" by the Colonial Chaplain, the Reverend Charles Bull. His enthronement was to take place in the Exchange Building in Port Stanley; however, Stirling refused to be enthroned in "half a commercial building" because it was not a cathedral. After a wall of the Exchange Building was destroyed in 1886, the present Stanley Cathedral was built, and consecrated in 1892.

Stirling resigned from the Falklands diocese in 1900 to become a Canon and Assistant Bishop at Wells Cathedral in England. He remained there for twenty years until his retirement at the age of 91.

== See also ==
- Martin Gusinde Anthropological Museum, the history of the Stirling House

== Bibliography ==
=== SAMS pamphlets by Waite Stirling ===
- South American Missionary Society; Waite Hockin Stirling (c. 1880). South American Missions: Other Sheep (Issue 1 of Occasional Papers in Illustration of the History and Work of the South American Missionary Society). Wm. Clowes and Sons, Limited.
- South American Missionary Society; Waite Hockin Stirling (1881). South American Missions: How a "good Soldier of Jesus Christ" Died (Issue 2 of Occasional Papers in Illustration of the History and Work of the South American Missionary Society). Wm. Clowes and Sons, Limited.
- South American Missionary Society; Waite Hockin Stirling (c. 1880). South American Missions: Lota (Issue 3 of Occasional Papers in Illustration of the History and Work of the South American Missionary Society). Wm. Clowes and Sons, Limited.
- Stirling, Waite (1891). The Falkland Islands and Tierra Del Fuego.

=== Books by Waite Stirling ===
- Marsh, John William; Waite Hockin Stirling (1883). The story of Commander Allen Gardiner, R.N.: with sketches of missionary work in South America. J. Nisbet & Co. http://anglicanhistory.org/sa/gardiner/marsh/.
- Grubb, Wilfrid Barbrooke (1904). Gertrude Wilson (ed.). Among the Indians of the Paraguayan Chaco: A Story of Missionary Work in South America. London: Charles Murray & Co.

=== Works concerning Waite Stirling ===
- Halcombe, Rev J J, ed. (1870). Mission Life; Or Home and Foreign Church Work. London: Jas. Truscott and Son. p. 90.
- The Bishopric of the Falkland Islands from Mission Life, Vol. III (new series). (Online transcription on Project Canterbury by the Right Reverend Dr. Terry Brown). 1872. pp. 622–629.
- The Bishop of the Falklands from Mission Life, Vol. III (new series). (Online transcription on Project Canterbury by the Right Reverend Dr. Terry Brown). 1872. p. 444.
- Tierra del Fuego as a Mission Field from Mission Life, Vol. VIII (new series). (Online transcription on Project Canterbury by the Right Reverend Dr. Terry Brown). 1877. pp. 3–6.
- The Natives of Tierra del Fuego from Mission Life, Vol. VIII (new series). (Online transcription on Project Canterbury by the Right Reverend Dr. Terry Brown). 1877. pp. 109–115.
- Churchman Associates (1897). The Churchman, Volume 76 (10 July). Churchman Company.
- Young, Robert (F.R.S.G.S.); South American Missionary Society (1900). From Cape Horn to Panama: a narrative of missionary enterprise among the neglected races of South America by the South American Missionary Society. South American Missionary Society. http://anglicanhistory.org/sa/young1905/.
- Burleigh; South American Missionary Society (1902). Witnessing under the Southern Cross: Mr. and Mrs. Burleigh at Wollaston and Tekenika. London: South American Missionary Society.
- Every, D.D., The Right Rev. Edward Francis (1915). The Anglican Church in South America. Society for Promoting Christian Knowledge. http://anglicanhistory.org/sa/every1915/.
- Whitaker's Peerage, Baronetage, Knightage and Companionage. J. Whitaker & sons. 1915. pp. 729.
- Macdonald, Frederick Charles (1929). Bishop Stirling of the Falklands: the adventurous life of a soldier of the cross whose humility hid the daring spirit of a hero & and an inflexible will to face great risks. Seeley, Service.
- Latourette, Kenneth Scott (1938). A history of the expansion of Christianity, vol. 5. Harper & Brothers. p. 103.
- Canclini, Arnoldo (1980). Waite H Stirling: El centinela de Dios en Ushuaia. Ediciones Marymar.
- Cannan, Edward (1992). Churches of the South Atlantic Islands, 1502–1991. Anthony Nelson. pp. 240ff. ISBN 9780904614473.
- Franciscan House of Celtic Studies and Historical Research (2006). Collectanea Hibernica, volume 48. Leinster Leader Limited. pp. 209, 216, 219, 223, 224, 227, 228, 230, 231.
