= Cyril Tucker =

British Anglican bishop

- Born: London
- Died: September 2, 1992 (aged 80)
- Education: St Catharine's College, Cambridge
- Occupation: Archbishop of Canterbury
- Parent(s): Henry Calesdine Tucker, Lilian Beatrice

Cyril James Tucker CBE (17 November 1911 – 3 September 1992) was an Anglican missionary bishop.

== Biography ==
Born in London to Henry Calesdine Tucker and Lilian Beatrice, Cyril was educated at Highgate School and St Catharine's College, Cambridge and ordained in 1936. he was deaconed on Trinity Sunday 1935 (16 June) and priest the next Trinity Sunday (7 June 1936) — both times by Arthur Winnington-Ingram, Bishop of London at St Paul's Cathedral. He served curacies at St Mark's, Dalston and St Barnabas, Cambridge. In 1937 he became Youth Secretary of the British and Foreign Bible Society and in 1939 a Chaplain in the RAFVR. When peace returned he became Warden of Monmouth School and in 1949 Chaplain of Wadham College, Oxford, and Chaplain of the Oxford Pastorate. He was Vicar of Holy Trinity, Cambridge, Rural Dean of Cambridge and Chaplain of the Cambridge Pastorate until 1963 when he was ordained to the episcopate: he was consecrated a bishop by Michael Ramsey, Archbishop of Canterbury, on 18 October 1963 at Westminster Abbey. He was Bishop in Argentina and Eastern South America until 1974. When he became Bishop, in addition to Argentina itself, the Diocese included Paraguay, Uruguay and the Falkland Islands. In 1969, the five northern provinces of the Argentine Republic were constituted as a separate diocese; in 1973 Paraguay became a separate diocese and jurisdiction over the Falkland Isles passed to the Archbishop of Canterbury.
