= Urbano Duarte =

Indigenous Anglican bishop in Argentina (1950–2018)

The Right Reverend Urbano Duarte
- Suffragan Bishop of Northern Argentina
- Church: Anglican Church of South America
- Diocese: Northern Argentina
- In office: 2016–2018

Orders
- Consecration: 5 June 2016 by Tito Zavala

Personal details
- Born: 1950
- Died: September 10, 2018 (aged 67)
- Buried: El Potrillo, Chaco, Argentina
- Spouse: Lucia
- Children: 5

Urbano Duarte (1950–2018) was a Wichí Anglican bishop in Argentina. He was one of three suffragan bishops of Northern Argentina in the Anglican Church of South America from 2016 until his death in 2018.

== Biography ==
Duarte was born and raised in El Yuto and was trained for ordained ministry under the Rev. Felipe Gutierrez. In 1999, after El Yuto was abandoned due to flooding, Duarte and his family relocated to El Potrillo in the Chaco region. In addition to being a priest, Duarte was a schoolteacher and specialized in teaching indigenous students the Wichí languages alongside Spanish.

Duarte was made a bishop alongside Crisanto Rojas and Mateo Alto on 5 June 2016. He served as a suffragan bishop until his death on 10 September 2018 after a short illness. Duarte was survived by his wife and five children.
