= Brian Skinner (bishop) =

English Anglican bishop (1939–2026)

The Right Reverend Brian Skinner
- Bishop of Valparaíso
- Church: Church of England; Province of the Southern Cone of America
- Diocese: Chile
- In office: 1977–1986
- Predecessor: David Pytches
- Other posts: Associate vicar, St Andrew's, Chorleywood
- Previous post: Archdeacon of Valparaíso

Orders
- Ordination: 1967 (diaconate); 1968 (priesthood)
- Consecration: 1977

Personal details
- Born: 1939
- Died: 19 February 2026 (aged 86–87)
- Spouse: Gillian
- Children: 5
- Education: University of Reading, Tyndale Hall, Bristol

Brian Antony Skinner (1939 – 19 February 2026) was an English Anglican bishop who served as a missionary in Chile. From 1977 to 1986, he was the suffragan bishop of Valparaíso in the Diocese of Chile in what became the Province of the Southern Cone of America. He was known as an evangelical and charismatic clergyman within Anglicanism.

== Early life, education and ordination ==
Skinner was born in 1939. He graduated from University of Reading in 1960 and from Tyndale Hall, Bristol in 1966. He was ordained as a deacon in 1967 and a priest in 1968, serving his curacy in the Diocese of Guildford.

== Missionary to Chile ==
Skinner was a missionary to Chile from 1970 to 1986. In Chile, he oversaw a growing network of church plants under the leadership of Bishop David Pytches. Pytches became a charismatic while in South America and embraced healing ministry and speaking in tongues. Under Pytches's oversight, Skinner was named archdeacon of Valparaíso in 1976 and then made suffragan bishop the following year.

During his time in Chile, due to the demands of many new churches without enough mature Christian members to become ordinands, Skinner became an advocate for lay presidency, the idea that laypeople be permitted preside at the Eucharist in order that church members not be deprived of sacramental ministry. With support from Pytches's successor as diocesan bishop, Colin Bazley, Skinner took the idea of lay presidency to the Southern Cone provincial synod, where a motion calling for a trial period for diaconal or lay presidency was narrowly defeated.

== Return to England ==
In 1986, Skinner returned to England. He took up a position as assistant vicar under Pytches at St Andrew's Chorleywood, a large evangelical church in the Diocese of St Albans. He remained at St Andrew's until 1996. While there, he and Pytches founded the Federation of Independent Anglican Churches. Formed over the concerns of Archbishop of Canterbury George Carey, the federation was intended to link churches that could not exist within the diocesan and parish structures of the Church of England—for example, church plants done across diocesan boundaries. Skinner and Pytches also coauthored a book on planting churches across parish boundaries. Through their leadership at St Andrew's, Pytches and Skinner also continued advocating for lay presidency within the Church of England.

== Death ==
Skinner died on 19 February 2026, the day of the funeral for his longtime wife, Gillian. The Skinners were survived by their four children.
