= Anglican Bishop of Santiago =

The Anglican Bishop of Santiago is a bishop in the Anglican communion, the head of the Anglican Diocese of Santiago within the Anglican Church of Chile. Until 2018, the bishop and diocese were "of Chile", in the Anglican Church of South America.

The diocese was founded in 1963 from the Diocese of the Falkland Islands.

The diocesan seat is the Santiago Community Church in Santiago. The incumbent diocesan bishop is Tito Zavala (born 1954), who was appointed in 2000.

In November 2018, the former Chile diocese become a province in its own right, subdivided into four new dioceses (Santiago, Valparaiso, Temuco, and Conception); Zavala remained in post, as his See and Diocese were renamed Santiago, and he was additionally elected inaugural metropolitan bishop and Primate/Presiding Bishop of the province.

== Bishops ==
Kenneth Walter Howell (4 February 1909 – 15 September 1995) was a British-born Anglican bishop who served as the first bishop of the diocese. He was deaconed in Advent 1933 (17 December) and priested the next Advent (23 December 1934) — both times by Richard Parsons, Bishop of Southwark, at Southwark Cathedral. He was consecrated a bishop by Michael Ramsey, Archbishop of Canterbury, at Westminster Abbey on 18 October 1963. He later served as an Assistant Bishop of London.

=== List of bishops ===
- 1963–1971: Kenneth Howell, Bishop of Chile, Bolivia, and Peru
  - 1969–1977: Colin Bazley, assistant bishop for Cautin & Malleco (until 1975), then for the Santiago region
  - 1970–1972: David Pytches, assistant bishop for the Valparaíso region
- 1972–1976: David Pytches, Bishop of Chile, Bolivia, and Peru
- 1977–2000: Colin Bazley, Bishop of Chile, Bolivia, and Peru (until October 1977), of Chile and Bolivia (until October 1981), and of Chile alone
  - 12 June 1994 – 2018: Abelino Apeleo, auxiliary bishop (became diocesan Bishop of Temuco)
  - 1998–2000: Tito Zavala, bishop coadjutor (succeeded as diocesan)
- 1 January 2000 – 12 January 2025: Tito Zavala (Chile until 2018, Santiago since)
  - 19 March 2016 – present: Nelson Ojeda, auxiliary bishop
  - 19 March 2016 – present: Alfred Cooper, auxiliary bishop
  - 15 July 2018 – 2018: Enrique Lago, auxiliary bishop (became diocesan Bishop of Concepción)
  - 15 July 2018 – 2018: Samuel Morrison, auxiliary bishop (became diocesan Bishop of Valparaíso)
- 12 January 2025 – present: Juan Esteban Saravia
