= Anglican Cathedral of St. John the Baptist =

Cathedral of St. John the Baptist
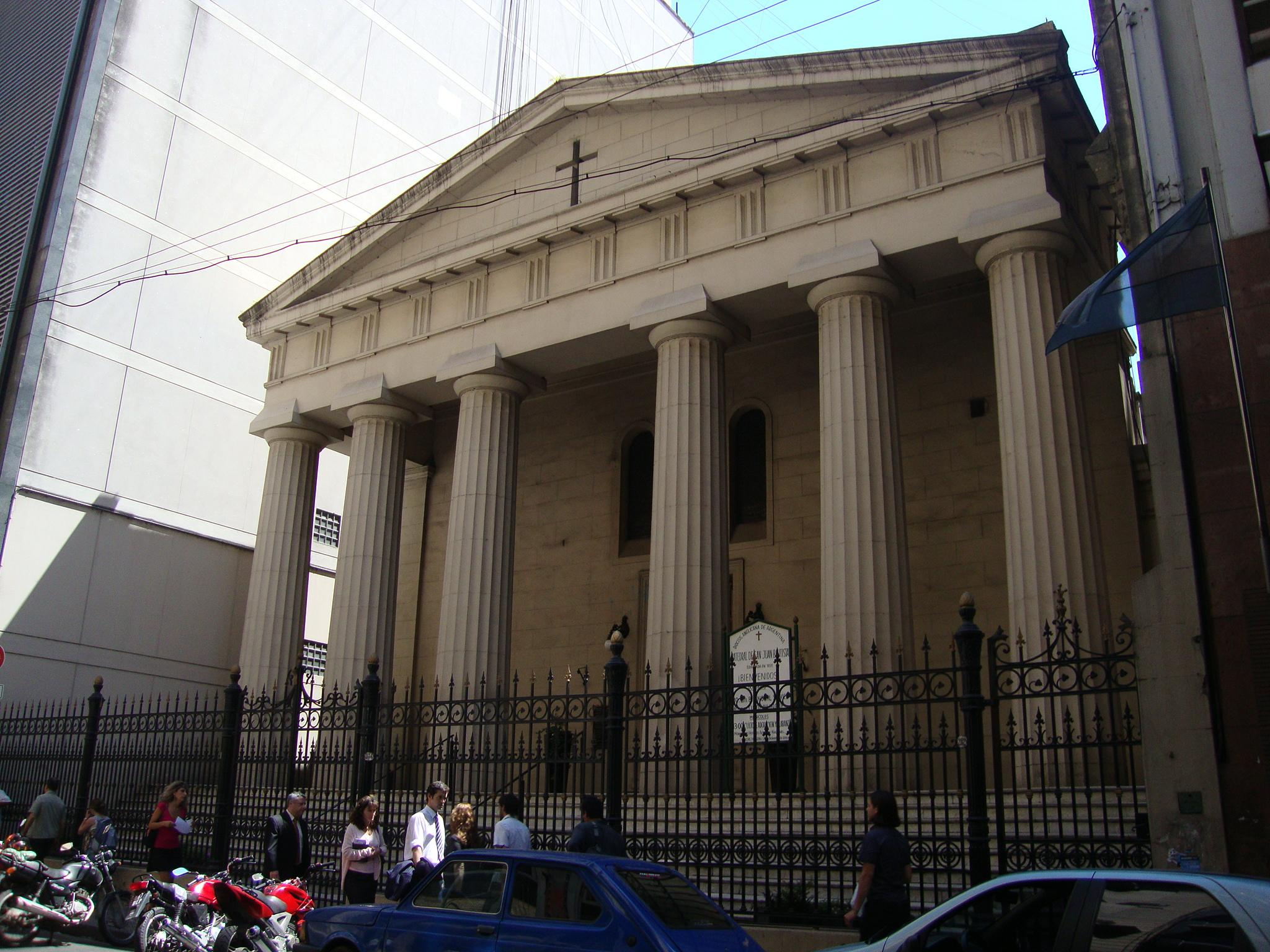
- Frontis.
- Cathedral of St. John the Baptist
- 34°36′18″S 58°22′17″W
- Denomination: Anglican
- Website: catedralanglicana.org.ar

History
- Dedication: John the Baptist

Architecture
- Architect: Richard Adams
- Architectural type: Neoclassical
- Years built: 1830–1831

Administration
- Diocese: Anglican (Episcopal) Diocese of Argentina

Clergy
- Bishop: The Rt. Revd. Brian Williams
- Rector: Revd. Marcelo Centurion

National Historic Monument of Argentina
- Designated: 2001

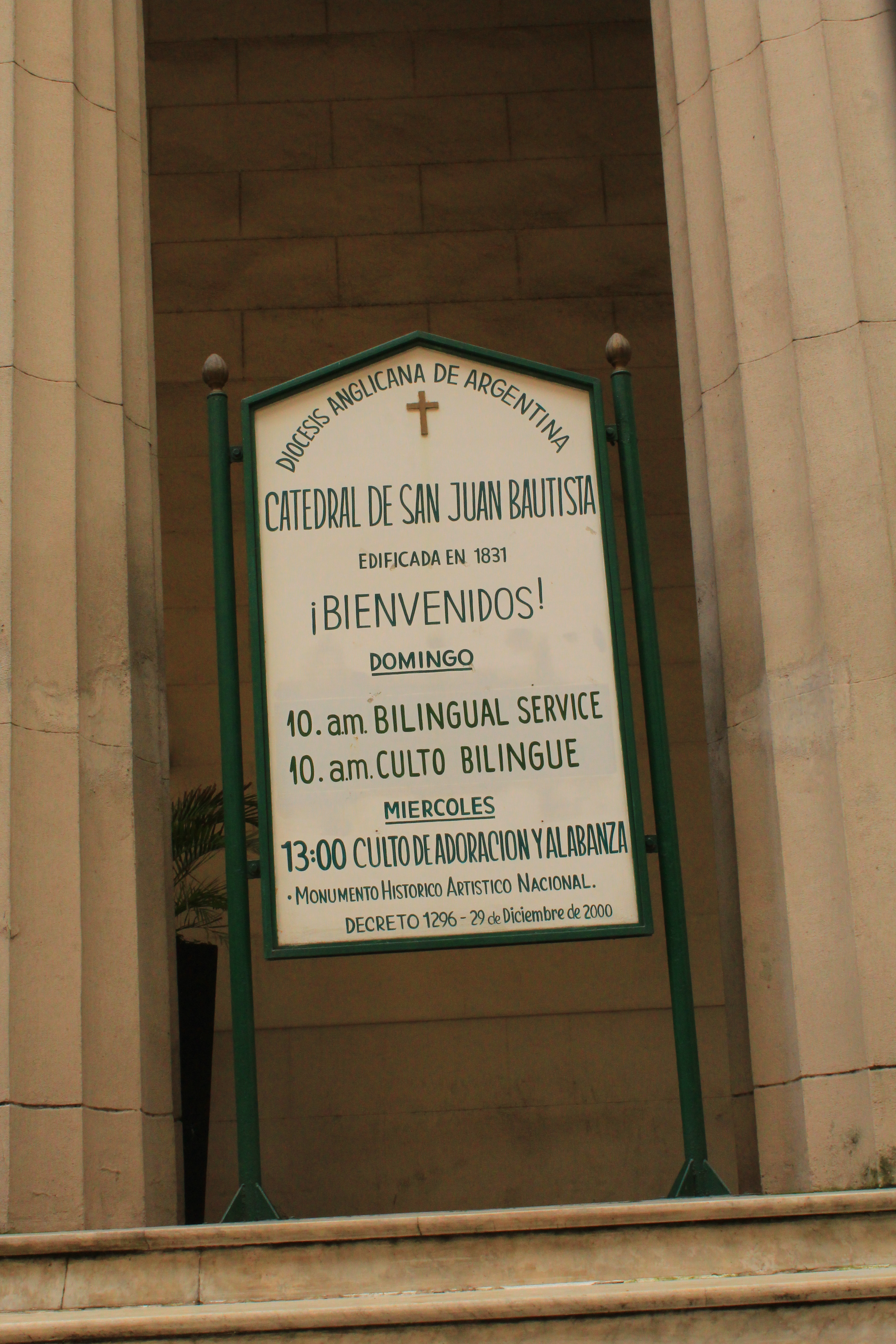
The sign-board of the church with scheduled bilingual services (in English and Spanish)

The Anglican Cathedral of St. John the Baptist is a cathedral in Buenos Aires, Argentina. It is located in Calle 25 de Mayo 282 (25 May Street) and is the oldest non-Catholic church building in Latin America.

== History ==
The construction started 1830 and was completed in 1831. It is the oldest non-Catholic church building in South America.

The church was constructed in record time and in a neo-classical style new to the city after a treaty was signed between the United Kingdom and Argentina in 1825, granting tolerance for the religion of British subjects resident in the country, and aided by a generous subsidy from the British government. The site, originally the cemetery of the convent of the Mercedarian friars, was donated by the then ruler of Argentina, Juan Manuel de Rosas.

From then until the present day and in the midst of numerous civil wars and conflicts, sieges and revolutions, the church has maintained a continuous presence and ministry three blocks from the seat of government, the Casa Rosada. Naturally it has undergone changes to its fabric, including the addition of a chancel in the 19th century to emphasize the importance of the Eucharist and the construction of choirs stalls, canons’ stalls, and bishop's throne in the 20th century. An excellent organ was also donated in the Victorian period. With time the walls became adorned with memorials and the windows were filled with stained glass. In 2000 the church was declared a national historical and artistic monument.

The cathedral is the Mother Church of the Diocese of Argentina and it is the place where the Diocesan Bishop and Dean, Brian Williams, has his “cathedra” or seat of honor. The Cathedral serves as a center for diocesan activities and is home to a dynamic Christian community. The membership is international, diverse, and committed to the Gospel of Jesus Christ.

The previous Bishop was the Rt. Rev. Gregory J. Venables.

== Worship ==
As from 2022 onwards, the cathedral has bilingual (Spanish, English) and trilingual (Spanish, English and Portuguese) services at 10:30 local time. As from 2023 it is also open some days at midday.

== Heritage designations ==
On December 29, 2000, the church was declared a National Historic and Artistic Monument by the Argentine Republic.

== See also ==
- Official site of the Anglican Cathedral of Buenos Aires
- Anglican Diocese of Argentina
- Anglican Communion
- Anglican Church of South America
