= Colin Bazley =

British Church of England bishop

- Bishop of Chile (&c.)
- Diocese: Diocese of Chile
- In office: 1977–2000
- Predecessor: David Pytches
- Successor: Tito Zavala
- Other posts: bishop in Chile (see prose); Presiding Bishop, CASA (1977–1983); Primate of the Province of the Southern Cone of America (1989–1995); Honorary assistant bishop, Diocese of Chester (2000–present)

Orders
- Ordination: 1959 (deacon); 1960 (priest) by Clifford Martin
- Consecration: 25 May 1969

Personal details
- Born: 27 June 1935 (age 91)
- Denomination: Anglican
- Parents: Reginald & Isabella
- Spouse: Barbara
- Children: three daughters
- Education: St Peter's Hall, Oxford

Colin Frederick Bazley (born 27 June 1935) is a retired bishop in the Church of England. He was a bishop in Chile from 1969 until his retirement in 2000.

== Early life, education and family ==
The son of Reginald Samuel Bazley and Isabella Davies, Bazley attended Birkenhead School before matriculating at St Peter's Hall, Oxford (whence he gained a Bachelor of Arts {BA} in 1957 and an Oxford Master of Arts {MA Oxon} in 1961) then training for ministry at Tyndale Hall, Bristol (a predecessor of Trinity College, Bristol). He was ordained at Liverpool Cathedral by Clifford Martin, Bishop of Liverpool — deacon at Michaelmas 1959 and priest at Michaelmas 1960 —, serving his Title (curacy) at St Leonard's, Bootle. In 1960, he married Barbara Helen Griffiths; they have three daughters, two of whom married Chileans; and eight grandchildren. One of Bazley's sons-in-law is Enrique Lago, Bishop of Concepción (Anglican Church of Chile).

== Missionary and bishop ==
In 1962, Bazley left for central Chile as a missionary with the South American Mission Society (SAMS). He stayed in that general region until 2000.

As a missionary priest, he also served as Rural Dean of Chol-Chol until 1966 and then as Archdeacon of Temuco or of Cautin and Malleco until his appointment to the episcopate. He was consecrated on Whitsun (Pentecost, 25 May) 1969 as Assistant Bishop for Cautin and Malleco, (but also called Assistant Bishop in Southern Chile) which See he served until 1975, when he was translated to become Assistant Bishop for Santiago. He remained in that post until 1977, when he became diocesan bishop for the Diocese of Chile, Bolivia and Peru (in which he'd served since its 1963 foundation; until then Chile was in the Diocese of the Falkland Islands) — the Bishop of Chile, Bolivia and Peru. In October 1977 and October 1981 the diocese was twice split, and twice Bazley remained as bishop in Chile: first as Bishop of Chile and Bolivia (1977–1981) then Bishop of Chile (1981–2000). While bishop diocesan in Chile, he also served as the Presiding Bishop of the Consejo Anglicano de Sud América (Executive Council for South America; CASA), 1977–1983 and as the Primate of the Province of the Southern Cone of America (the successor to CASA), 1989–1995; and as a member of the Inter-Anglican Theological and Doctrinal Commission, 1994–1997. In 1999, Bazley was one of the Primates to sign a letter of warning to Frank Griswold, Presiding Bishop of The Episcopal Church.

== Retirement ==
Following his retirement back to his native Wirral in 2000, he has been licensed as an honorary assistant bishop in the Diocese of Chester and served as Warden of Readers, 2000–2005, and as Rural Dean of Wallasey, 2009–2011. During his retirement he has been identified by the secessionist Anglican Mission in England as one of five Church of England bishops ready to support them in 2011.

Celebrating the 50th anniversary of his presbyteral ordination in 2019, he was still an honorary assistant bishop in Chester.

Anglican Communion titles
Preceded by David Pytches	Bishop of Chile, Bolivia and Peru; 1977–1977	Succeeded by himself as Bishop of Chile and Bolivia
Preceded by David Pytches	Bishop of Chile, Bolivia and Peru; 1977–1977	Succeeded by Bill Flagg as Bishop of Peru
Preceded by himself as Bishop of Chile, Bolivia and Peru	Bishop of Chile and Bolivia; 1977–1981	Succeeded by himself as Bishop of Chile
Preceded by himself as Bishop of Chile, Bolivia and Peru	Bishop of Chile and Bolivia; 1977–1981	Succeeded by David Evans as Bishop of Peru and Bolivia
Preceded by himself as Bishop of Chile and Bolivia	Bishop of Chile; 1981–2000	Succeeded by Tito Zavala
