= Joel Millanguir =

Chilean Anglican bishop

The Right Reverend Joel Millanguir
- Bishop of Araucanía
- Church: Anglican Church of Chile
- Diocese: Araucanía
- In office: 2023–present
- Predecessor: Abelino Manuel Apeleo

Orders
- Consecration: December 10, 2023 by Tito Zavala

Joel Millanguir Ancavil is an indigenous Chilean Anglican bishop. He is the second diocesan bishop of Araucanía in the Anglican Church of Chile.

== Biography ==
Millanguir is a member of the Mapuche people to whom the Diocese of Araucanía ministers. He was raised as a Christian.

Prior to being elected bishop, Millanguir was archdeacon for Araucanía in the then-diocese of Chile and area coordinator for Cholchol, as well as a teacher in the Chilean church's Rural Bible Institute.

He was consecrated to the episcopacy by Tito Zavala at a service in Cholchol on December 10, 2023.
