= Nick Drayson =

English Anglican bishop (born 1953)

The Most Reverend Nick Drayson
- Presiding Bishop of the Anglican Church of South America; Bishop of Northern Argentina
- Church: Anglican Church of South America
- Diocese: Northern Argentina
- In office: 2011–2023
- Predecessor: Maurice Sinclair
- Other post: Presiding bishop of the Anglican Church of South America (2021–2023)

Orders
- Ordination: 1979
- Consecration: 2009 by Gregory Venables

Personal details
- Born: 1953 (age 72–73)

Nicholas James Quested Drayson (born 1953) is an English-born Anglican bishop. Beginning in 2011, he was the bishop of Northern Argentina, and from 2021 until his retirement from both posts in May 2023, he was the presiding bishop of the Anglican Church of South America.

== Biography ==
Drayson was educated at Keble College, Oxford and Wycliffe Hall, Oxford. He was ordained an Anglican priest in 1979. Drayson began his career with the South American Mission Society (SAMS) as a missionary to Argentina's indigenous people—in particular, the Chorote people of northeastern Argentina. Drayson completed the translation of the New Testament into Chorote in 2007. In addition to his work in Latin America, Drayson also served in Andalucia and at Beverley Minster.

In 2009, Drayson was elected suffragan bishop of Northern Argentina. He was installed as diocesan bishop in 2011.

In 2021, Drayson was elected presiding bishop of the Anglican Church of South America. He served until retiring amid health concerns in May 2023.

== Personal life ==
Drayson is married to Catherine Le Tissier. They have two adult children. Following his retirement, Drayson became incumbent of Castel Parish Church in Guernsey.

Anglican Communion titles
Preceded by Maurice Sinclair	Bishop of Northern Argentina; 2009–2023	Succeeded by Vacant
Preceded by Gregory Venables	Presiding Bishop of the Anglican Church of South America; 2021–2023	Succeeded by Brian Williams
