= Peter Bartlett =

Peter Bartlett may refer to:

- Peter Bartlett (actor) (born 1942), American-born actor
- Peter Bartlett (architect) (1929–2019), New Zealand architect and professor of architectural design
- Peter Bartlett (bishop) (born 1954), Bishop of Paraguay
