= Juan Esteban Saravia =

Chilean Anglican bishop

The Right Reverend Juan Esteban Saravia
- Bishop of Santiago
- Church: Anglican Church of Chile
- Diocese: Santiago
- In office: 2025–present

Orders
- Ordination: January 9, 2010
- Consecration: January 12, 2025 by Tito Zavala

Personal details
- Born: Santiago, Chile

Juan Esteban Saravia Cortés is a Chilean Anglican bishop. He is the second diocesan bishop of Santiago in the Anglican Church of Chile.

== Biography ==
Saravia was born in Santiago and grew up in Concepción. He worked as a construction professional until studying for pastoral ministry at Chile's Center for Pastoral Studies. He planted Iglesia Cristo Redentor in Ñuñoa in 2011 and served as pastor there. In 2023, Saravia and his family moved to Vienna, Virginia, where he was a pastor at Christ Church in the Anglican Church in North America and studied at Trinity Anglican Seminary. In April 2024, Saravia was elected diocesan bishop of Santiago to succeed Tito Zavala. He was consecrated and installed as bishop by Zavala at a service in Santiago on January 12, 2025. The service also marked Zavala's retirement as primate, succeeded by Enrique Lago.

== Personal life ==
Saravia is married to Carolina and they have four children.

Anglican Communion titles
| Preceded by Tito Zavala | Anglican Bishop of Santiago; Since 2025 | Incumbent |
