= Enrique Lago =

Chilean Anglican archbishop

The Most Reverend Enrique Lago
- Archbishop of the Anglican Church of Chile; Bishop of the South of Chile
- Church: Anglican Church of Chile
- Diocese: Sur de Chile
- In office: 2025–present
- Predecessor: Tito Zavala
- Previous post(s): Archdeacon of Concepción

Orders
- Consecration: 15 July 2018 by Gregory Venables

Enrique Lago Zugadi is a Chilean Anglican bishop. Since 2025, he has been the second archbishop of the Anglican Church of Chile.

== Biography ==
From 1994 to 2017, Lago was pastor of Iglesia Providencia in Santiago. In 2017, he was installed as rector of St. James' Church in Punta Arenas and was missionary archdeacon in the south.

As the Diocese of Chile sought recognition as an autonomous Anglican Communion province, in 2018 Lago was elected as the future diocesan bishop of Concepción (later called the Diocese of the South of Chile). He was consecrated to the episcopacy at St. Paul's Cathedral, Valparaíso, alongside Samuel Morrison, on July 15, 2018, and became diocesan bishop upon the formation of the diocese that year.

On 12 January 2025, Lago succeeded Tito Zavala as the second archbishop of the Anglican Church of Chile.

== Personal life ==
Lago is the son-in-law of the last English-born bishop of Chile, Colin Bazley.

Anglican Communion titles
New title	Bishop of the South of Chile; 2018–present	Incumbent
Preceded by Tito Zavala	Archbishop of the Anglican Church of Chile; 2025–present	Incumbent
