= Gordon Savage =

Gordon Savage may refer to:

- Gordon Savage (ice hockey) (1906–1974), ice hockey player
- Gordon Savage (bishop) (1915–1990), Anglican bishop
