= Bishop of Santiago =

Bishop of Santiago may refer to:

- Anglican Bishop of Santiago, Chile.
- Archbishop of Santiago (Chile), a Roman Catholic diocese in Chile.
- Archbishop of Santiago de Compostela in Galicia (Spain).
