= Betty Ridley =

British church administrator

Dame Betty Ridley DBE

Third Church Estates Commissioner
- In office 1972–1981
- Preceded by: Sir Hubert Ashton

Personal details
- Born: Mildred Betty Mosley; 10 September 1909
- Died: 1 August 2005 (aged 95)
- Education: North London Collegiate School; Cheltenham Ladies' College

Dame Mildred Betty Ridley DBE (10 September 1909 – 1 August 2005) was a leading figure in the life of the Church of England from the 1960s into the 1980s. She served as Third Church Estates Commissioner from 1972 until 1981, the first woman to hold the post.

== Early life ==
Ridley was the daughter of Rev. Henry Mosley and his wife Mildred Willis. Her father, was then Rector of Poplar, London. He was in 1919 appointed Bishop of Stepney and, in 1928 Bishop of Southwell. She was educated at the independent North London Collegiate School and at Cheltenham Ladies' College. She married Michael Ridley, her father's chaplain at the age of 19. Michael Ridley became incumbent of parishes in Pimlico and Finchley. He died at an early age in 1953, leaving his widow with four children.

== Women in the church ==
Ridley believed that women should be accepted as candidates for Holy Orders. (Her father was at one time chairman of a central Council for Women's Church Work). She took many opportunities to forward this cause. Before her husband died, she was elected to the Anglican Church Assembly and joined the Council for Woman's Work. She played a major part in settling the structures of the Assembly's successor body, the General Synod. For the ten years of its existence, she was at the heart of the new Synod. She served for 25 years on the Central Board of Finance and she was a member "the first woman to be appointed" of the Advisory Council for the Training of the Ministry.

In 1979, Ridley was a founding member of the Movement for the Ordination of Women. In 1982, she chaired the Crown Appointments Commission that led to the appointment of John Habgood as Archbishop of York.

From 1959 to 1981 she was a Church Commissioner, and active on various committees. In 1972, Archbishop Michael Ramsey appointed her to succeed Sir Hubert Ashton as Third Church Estates Commissioner, the first woman to hold the post, which she held until 1981.

== Other interests ==
Ridley was a member of The Bach Choir for most of her adult life and sang under Reginald Jacques and David Willcocks. She also took part in the television programme Evensong, shown in the BBC's Everyman series in December 1992.
