= Michele Pollesel =

Canadian Anglican bishop of Uruguay (1949–2025

The Right Reverend Michele Pollesel
- Bishop of Uruguay
- Church: Anglican Church of Canada; Anglican Church of South America
- Diocese: Uruguay
- Elected: December 2011
- In office: 2013–2017
- Predecessor: Miguel Tamayo Zaldívar
- Successor: Daniel Genovesi
- Previous post: General secretary of the Anglican Church of Canada

Orders
- Ordination: 1979 (diaconate), 1980 (priesthood)
- Consecration: May 26, 2013

Personal details
- Born: August 1, 1949 Copper Cliff, Ontario, Canada
- Died: November 21, 2025 (aged 76) Ottawa, Ontario, Canada
- Denomination: Anglicanism
- Spouse: Karen Kelly (m. 1974); Gail "Gini" Pollesel (d. 1992); Vilma Pollesel
- Children: 3
- Education: Laurentian University; Carleton University; Wycliffe College, Toronto; Colgate Rochester Crozer Divinity School

Michele (Note: Some sources list his first name in English as "Michael") Frank Pollesel (August 1, 1949 – November 21, 2025) was a Canadian Anglican bishop. He was general secretary of the Anglican Church of Canada (ACC) from 2006 to 2011, and from 2013 to 2017 he was bishop of Uruguay in the Anglican Church of South America (ACSA).

== Early life and education ==
Pollesel was born in 1949 to Italian-Canadian parents in the Copper Cliff area of Sudbury. He received his bachelor's degree from Laurentian University, his master's degree from Carleton University and his master of divinity from Wycliffe College, Toronto. He later earned a doctor of ministry from the Colgate Rochester Crozer Divinity School.

== Ordained ministry ==
Pollesel was ordained to the diaconate in 1979 and as a priest in 1980. He began his clerical career in the Diocese of Toronto. In 1984, he led St. Simon's Anglican Church in Highland Creek to amalgamate into St. Dunstan of Canterbury Anglican Church in Scarborough, where he was incumbent.

Pollesel moved to the Diocese of Ontario in 1994, where he was incumbent St. Thomas' Anglican Church in Belleville. He later held executive roles with the diocese as an archdeacon before being appointed general secretary for the ACC in 2006. In this capacity, he was the chief operating officer for the ACC, overseeing a staff then totaling 100.

Pollesel was elected bishop of Uruguay in December 2011. The bishops of the ACSA (then known as the Province of the Southern Cone) twice declined to approve his election, which led to the Diocese of Uruguay seeking unsuccessfully to affiliate with the Anglican Episcopal Church of Brazil due to greater theological compatibility. Pollesel was consecrated and assumed his office in May 2013. He served as bishop until July 2017.

During his tenure, he advocated for recognition of same-sex marriage and for reconciliation with indigenous peoples. He oversaw the ordination of the first female priests in the ACSA. Pollesel also challenged churches in the Diocese of Uruguay to refocus on evangelism and invited missionaries from the Diocese of Chile to assist with church planting in the strongly secular country.

== Personal life and death ==
Pollesel was a fluent speaker of English, French, Italian and Spanish.

He married his first wife, Karen, in 1974. They had three children. His second wife, Gail "Gini" Pollesel, died in a car crash on December 27, 2009. Michele Pollesel broke ribs and experienced a concussion in the crash. His third wife, Vilma, was of Brazilian descent.

Pollesel returned to Canada after retiring as bishop. Diagnosed with pancreatic cancer in 2019, he died in November 2025.
