= Gilberto Obdulio Porcal Martinez =

Anglican Bishop in Uruguay

Gilberto Obdulio Porcal Martinez is an Anglican bishop in Uruguay. He has been the Suffragan Bishop of Uruguay since 2012.
