= David Evans (Anglican bishop) =

British Anglican clergyman

David Richard John Evans (born 5 June 1938) is a British former Anglican clergyman who was a missionary bishop from 1978 to 1988.

Evans was educated at Gonville and Caius College, Cambridge and ordained in 1966. His first post was a curacy at Christ Church, Cockfosters. In 1968 he became a missionary pastor with the Argentine Inter-Varsity Christian Fellowship, serving until 1977. He was the Chaplain of the Good Shepherd Church in Lima then Bishop of Peru.

Returning to England in 1988, he was an Assistant Bishop of Bradford (including serving as archbishop's commissary, i.e. acting diocesan bishop in 1991–2) until 1 July 1993. He then served as General Secretary of the South American Mission Society until his retirement in 2003; meanwhile, he was also an assistant bishop in Chichester, Canterbury and Rochester (all 1994–1997), in Birmingham (1997–2003). In retirement, he was an associate priest for the Stourdene benefice from 2003 until 2010 and an honorary assistant bishop in the Diocese of Coventry.

Anglican Communion titles
Preceded by Bill Flagg	Bishop of Peru; 1978–1988	Succeeded by Alan Winstanley
