= Anglican Church of Chile =

Christian denomination in Chile

- Iglesia Anglicana de Chile
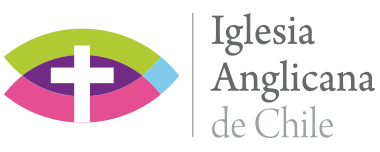
- Classification: Protestant
- Orientation: Anglican
- Scripture: Holy Bible
- Theology: Anglican doctrine
- Polity: Episcopal
- Primate: Enrique Lago
- Associations: Anglican Communion, GAFCON, Global South
- Language: Spanish, Mapudungun, English
- Headquarters: Santiago, Chile
- Territory: Chile
- Members: c. 20,000
- Official website: iach.cl

The Anglican Church of Chile (Spanish: Iglesia Anglicana de Chile) is the ecclesiastical province of the Anglican Communion that covers four dioceses in Chile. Formed in 2018, the province is the 40th in the Anglican Communion. The province consists of four dioceses. Its primate and metropolitan is the Archbishop of Chile, Enrique Lago.

== History ==
=== Diocese of the Falkland Islands ===
During the 19th century, British immigrants to South America brought Anglicanism with them (Milmine 1993, p. 8). The Patagonian Missionary Society, renamed South American Mission Society (SAMS) in 1868, was initially active in Tierra del Fuego and later extended its activities to the Araucanian region. It was responsible for the formation of all the early Anglican churches and missions in Chile.

Waite Stirling, a missionary from the South American Missionary Society, was consecrated at Westminster Abbey on 21 December 1869 as the first Bishop of the Falkland Islands. The see of the bishop was in Buenos Aires (Milmine 1993, p. 11). This was due to legal requirements at the time which did not allow the Church of England to consecrate or appoint bishops outside those territories under the jurisdiction of the Crown, but the jurisdiction of the bishop was stated to be all of South America apart from British Guiana.

=== Diocese of Chile ===
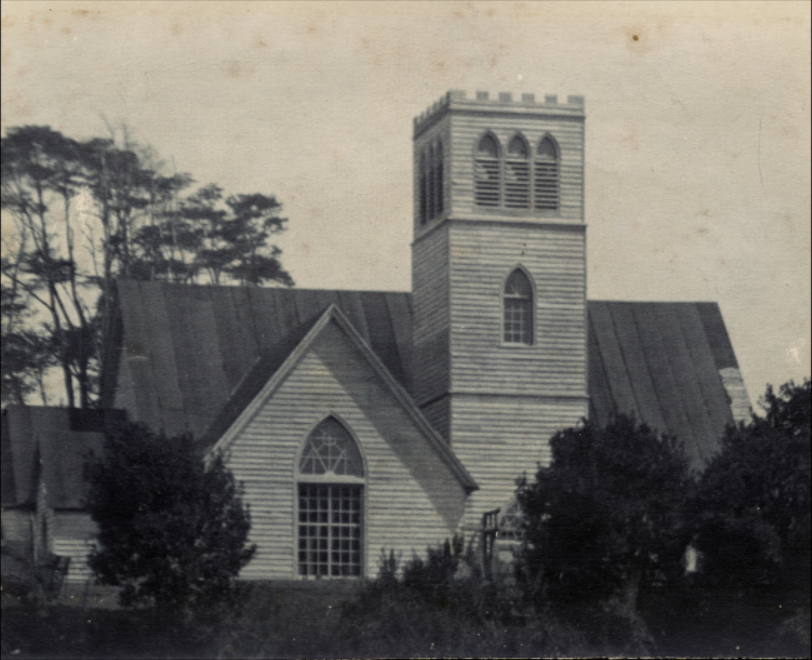
Cholchol Anglican Church (1915), Cautín Province.

The Diocese of Chile, Bolivia and Peru was formed in 1963, as part of a general process of forming national dioceses out of the enormous diocese of the Falkland Islands. Following expansion it became the Diocese of Chile and Bolivia in 1971 when Peru became a separate diocese. It was again renamed the Diocese of Chile in 1981, following separation from Bolivia.

Until 1974, the various dioceses of the southern cone were under the metropolitical oversight of the Archbishop of Canterbury. In that year a process began to inaugurate a new Anglican province. The Diocese of Chile was a constituent and founding diocese of the new Province of the Southern Cone of America in 1981, and remained part of that province until 2018, although the province was renamed in September 2014 as the Anglican Church of South America.

=== Proposed autonomy ===
Following the change of provincial name, two constituent dioceses, Chile and Peru, both began expansion towards forming autonomous provinces. In 2017 the Diocese of Peru voted at its diocesan synod to abandon its plans to form an autonomous province, but the diocese of Chile continued its expansion towards that goal. As part of these preparations, auxiliary bishops were consecrated. Three auxiliary bishops, together with the diocesan bishop Tito Zavala, took responsibility for four geographical regions, and in 2018 these were formed into four new dioceses.

=== Province of Chile ===
Following approval from the Anglican Consultative Council the four Chilean dioceses were nominated to form an autonomous province, to be established in 2018, and named Iglesia Anglicana de Chile (the Anglican Church of Chile).

The inauguration was carried out in a special service on 4 November 2018 in Santiago. The Presiding Bishop of South America, Gregory Venables, presided at the service, and the Archbishop of Canterbury, Justin Welby, presided over the inauguration and preached the sermon in the presence of bishops and archbishops from across South America and other parts of the Anglican Communion. Archbishop Welby handed primatial authority (represented by the symbolic handing over of a primatial cross) to Archbishop Tito Zavala, the Bishop of Santiago, and previously Bishop of Chile. Archbishop Zavala had previously served as Primate of South America from 2010 to 2016.

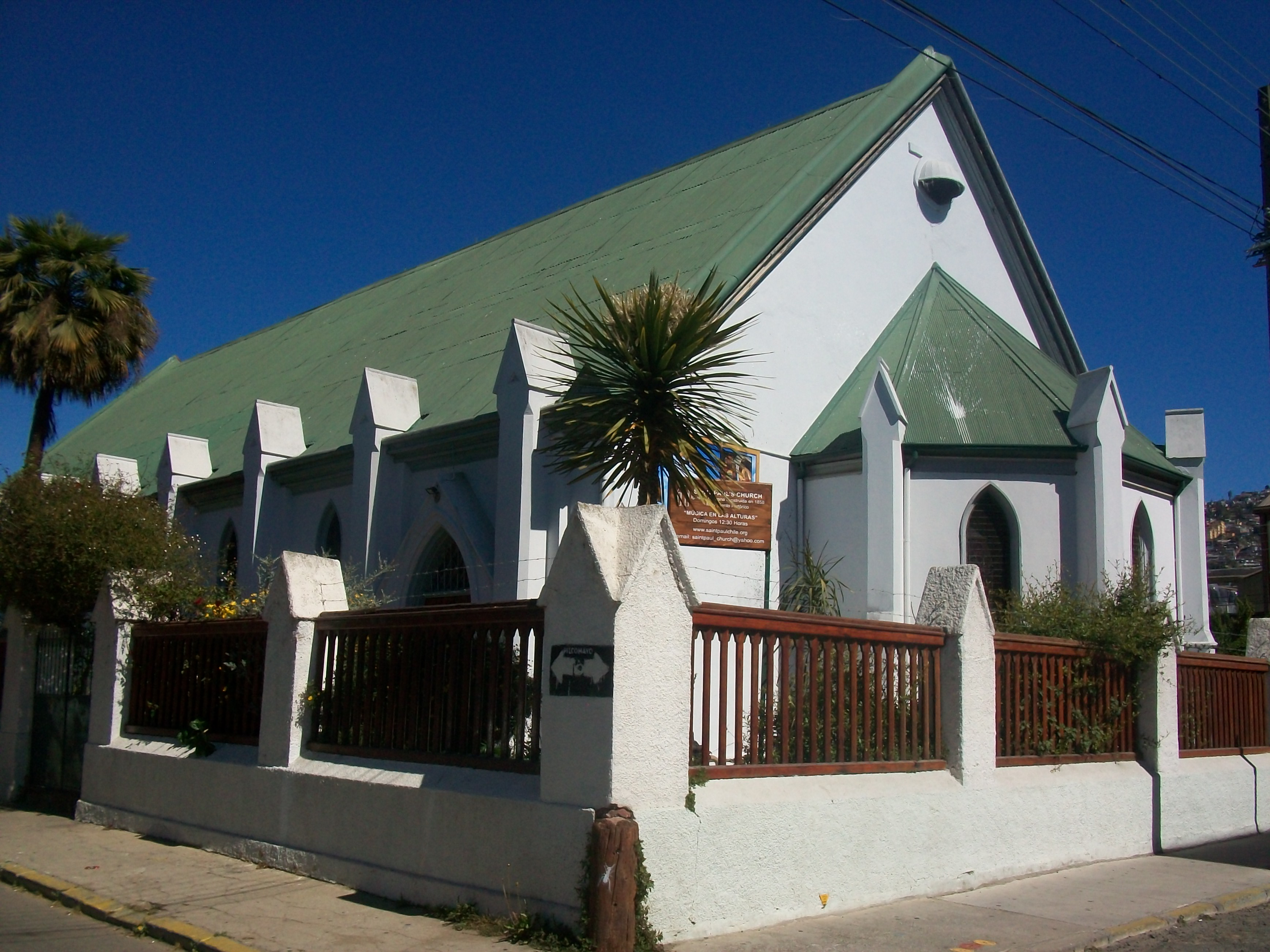
St. Paul's Anglican Cathedral in Valparaíso, completed in 1858.

The new province gives the statistics of 95 parishes and approximately 20,000 members for their membership.

The Chilean House of Bishops at the formation of the province in 2018 consisted of:

- Héctor Zavala Muñoz (commonly known as Tito Zavala), consecrated 1998, Bishop of Santiago from 2018, first Archbishop;
- Abelino Manuel Apeleo, consecrated 1994, Bishop of Temuco from 2018;
- Samuel Morrison, consecrated 2018, Bishop of Valparaíso from 2018;
- Enrique Lago, consecrated 2018, Bishop of Concepción from 2018;
- Alfred Cooper, consecrated 2016, auxiliary bishop;
- Nelson Ojeda, consecrated 2016, auxiliary bishop.

== Archbishops ==
The primate and metropolitan of the province is the Archbishop of Chile.

- Tito Zavala, 2018–2025
- Enrique Lago, 2025–present

== Dioceses ==
The province consists of four dioceses.

Diocese	Year founded	Territory	Number of congregations (2024)	Cathedral	See city	Bishop(s)
Araucanía	2018	Araucanía	40	None	Temuco	Joel Millanguir
Santiago	1981	Santiago Metropolitan, O'Higgins	20	None	Santiago	Juan Esteban Saravia (diocesan); Alfred Cooper and Nelson Ojeda (auxiliary)
South of Chile	2018	Maule, Ñuble, Biobío, Los Ríos, Los Lagos, Aysén, Magallanes	9	None	Concepción	Enrique Lago
Valparaíso	2018	Arica and Parinacota, Tarapacá, Antofagasta, Atacama, Coquimbo, Valparaíso	14	St. Paul's Cathedral	Valparaíso	Vacant

== Previous bishops ==
As a constituent diocese of the South American province, the Anglican Church in Chile was previously led by Bishop David Pytches (1972–1976) and Bishop Colin Bazley (1977–2000). Tito Zavala became the first Chilean native bishop in 2000; Abelino Manuel Apeleo became an assistant bishop in 2016.

== Anglican realignment ==
The Anglican Church of South America, formerly known as Anglican Church of the Southern Cone of America, from which the Anglican Province of Chile was formed, has been involved in the Anglican realignment. Likewise the Anglican Church of Chile is also a member of the Global South and the Global Anglican Future Conference (GAFCON), and is in full communion with the Anglican Church in North America (ACNA), formed in 2009 by former members of the Episcopal Church in the United States and the Anglican Church of Canada, wishing to maintain a more conservative approach to biblical interpretation and authority. Representatives of the Anglican Church in North America were present at the inauguration of the new province, including former archbishop Robert Duncan and current Foley Beach.

The future Anglican Church of Chile was represented at GAFCON III, in Jerusalem, on 17–22 June 2018, by a 15 members delegation.

== Bibliography ==
Milmine, Obispo Douglas (1993), La Comunion Anglicana en América Latina
