= Patrick Harris =

British bishop (1934–2020)

The Rt Revd Patrick Harris
- Bishop of Southwell
- Diocese: Diocese of Southwell
- In office: 1988–1999
- Predecessor: Michael Whinney
- Successor: George Cassidy
- Other post: Bishop of Northern Argentina (1973–1980)

Orders
- Ordination: 1960 (deacon); 1961 (priest)
- Consecration: 28 May 1973

Personal details
- Born: 30 September 1934
- Died: 26 December 2020 (aged 86)
- Denomination: Anglican
- Parents: Edward Harris & Astrid Kendall
- Spouse: Valerie Pilbrow (m. 1968)
- Children: 2 sons; 1 daughter
- Education: Keble College, Oxford

Patrick Burnet Harris (30 September 1934 – 26 December 2020) was a Church of England bishop who served in two episcopal positions.

He was educated at St Albans School and Keble College, Oxford. He trained for ordination at Clifton Theological College. He was ordained deacon in 1960 and priest in 1961 and his first post was as a curate at St Ebbe's Church, Oxford after which he became a missionary in South America with the South American Mission Society. He became the Archdeacon of Salta in 1969 before being ordained to the episcopate four years later as Bishop of Northern Argentina.

After seven years he returned to England firstly as Rector of Kirkheaton and Assistant Bishop of Wakefield (1981–1985); and then Secretary of the Partnership for World Mission and Assistant Bishop of Oxford (1986–1988) where he remained until he was appointed Bishop of Southwell, a post he held until his 1999 retirement.

In retirement he served as an assistant bishop in the Diocese of Lincoln (1999–2005), in the Diocese of Gloucester (2005–2017) and in the Diocese in Europe (1999 until his death). He died on 26 December 2020, aged 86.

Anglican Communion titles
New title	Bishop of Northern Argentina; 1973–1980	Succeeded by David Leake
Preceded by Michael Whinney	Bishop of Southwell; 1988–1999	Succeeded by George Cassidy
