= Alfred Cooper (bishop) =

Chilean Anglican bishop

The Right Reverend Alfred Cooper
- Auxiliary Bishop of Santiago
- Church: Anglican Church of Chile
- Diocese: Santiago
- In office: 2016–present

Orders
- Ordination: 1976 (diaconate); 1978 (priesthood)
- Consecration: March 19, 2016 by Gregory Venables

Personal details
- Born: 1950 (age 75–76) Chile

Alfred Philip "Alf" Cooper (born 1950) is an evangelical Anglican bishop in Chile. He was consecrated as auxiliary bishop in the Diocese of Chile and, after the recognition of the Anglican Church of Chile as an autonomous province of the Anglican Communion in 2018, he continued as auxiliary bishop in the Diocese of Santiago. Cooper served as chaplain to Chilean President Sebastián Piñera during his first term.

== Early life ==
Cooper was born in Chile to a family of British descent and raised there. He was sent to the U.K. for school and for studies at the University of Bristol. After graduating with a degree in modern languages, Cooper moved to Montserrat to teach secondary school. He went back to London to study for ministry at All Nations Christian College, and returned to Chile to pursue ordained ministry in 1974.

That year, he met his future wife, Hilary Barratt, who had grown up on the mission field in a family serving with the South American Mission Society. In 1975, the Coopers began a career of church planting in Santiago as missionaries with SAMS and later the Church Mission Society.

== Ordained ministry ==
Cooper was ordained to the priesthood in the Province of the Southern Cone of America in 1978. In 1983, the Coopers planted the Church of the Trinity (Iglesia de la Trinidad) in Las Condes, Santiago, where Cooper continues to serve as head pastor. In 2000, Cooper was named a canon of the diocese, and in 2015, he was consecrated an auxiliary bishop.

== Public activities ==
Cooper was appointed chaplain to President Sebastián Piñera at La Moneda, serving from 2010 to 2013. During this time, Cooper was one of the ministers on site during the Copiapó mine collapse and rescue. During the 69 days that it took to find the miners and effect the rescue, Cooper often led prayers at the rescue site. He also led prayers at La Moneda in the days before the miners were found by rescue probes. "The President called for an emergency prayer meeting," Cooper said. "We left their photos on the altar in the chapel in the palace. That prayer meeting was attended by all the ministers and two weeks later they were found."

In October 2010, Cooper was at Piñera's side when the last miner was hauled up in the rescue vehicle, receiving significant media attention. Cooper credited God for protecting the miners and enabling them to endure the underground ordeal. "Many were Catholics, but many went down without any faith at all, many were nominal in their faith. And they all say this: 'We were not 33, we were 34 because Jesus Christ was with us down there.'"

Cooper accompanied one of the miners, Jose Henriquez—who in addition to working as a miner was an evangelical pastor—on a speaking tour in England and translated for Henriquez during his appearance at Durham Cathedral.

During the 2017 Chilean elections, Cooper supported efforts to promote evangelical candidates for public office under the Por un Chile para Cristo campaign, although he acknowledged that evangelicals were reluctant to get involved in electoral matters due to "pietistic" views that politics is a "worldly affair." Cooper has been an outspoken advocate against decriminalization of abortion.In the run-up to the 2017 legislation to permit abortion during the first trimester, Cooper organized a signature campaign that aimed to stop a change in the law. He noted: "Hoy existen por lo menos 500 millones de abortos legales al año en el mundo, lo cual hace que el lugar más peligroso de la tierra no sea ni Irak ni Siria, sino el vientre de la madre. En ninguna otra parte del mundo muere tanta gente." ("Today there are at least 500 million legal abortions a year in the world, which means that the most dangerous place on earth is neither Iraq nor Syria, but the mother's womb. Nowhere else in the world do so many people die.")

In 2020, Cooper began a one-year term as the government's protocol representative for evangelical churches, a role that includes representing churches at public ceremonies and events. In 2022, Cooper opposed the constitutional reform championed by newly inaugurated President Gabriel Boric; the referendum to adopt the constitution, which Cooper described as "inherently neo-Marxist," ultimately failed. During a meeting with Boric at La Moneda, Cooper joked that the agnostic president was Chile's first Anglican president owing to his education at an Anglican international school.

== Anglican issues ==
Unlike some bishops from other GAFCON-affiliated provinces, Cooper attended the 2022 Lambeth Conference, where he said conservative bishops had "ample opportunity to express Global South insistence on the 1.10 resolution regarding homosexual practice (which the archbishop re-affirmed to a standing ovation), and also to listen to those who felt same-sex marriage was a justice issue that the Church would need to learn to live with."

In 2023, after the Church of England bishops announced their approval for prayers to bless civil same-sex marriages and the General Synod affirmed the bishops' decision, Cooper joined a unanimous letter from the Chilean Anglican bishops that called same-sex blessings "a practice contrary to what is established by the Word of God" and warning that "this 'blessing' is the first step of several to finally approve the marriage of same-sex couples and at the end, the freedom of conscience that is argued so much for those who disagree and do not want to do so will no longer be respected."

== Personal life ==
Cooper is married to Hilary; they have four adult children and several grandchildren. Cooper is completing a Ph.D. at the Oxford Centre for Mission Studies on the theology of Willis Hoover, the founder of Chilean Pentecostalism.
