= William Godfrey (bishop) =

Anglican Bishop of Peru and Uruguay

The Right Reverend William Godfrey
- Bishop of Peru
- Church: Anglican Church of South America
- Diocese: Diocese of Peru
- Installed: 1998
- Term ended: 2017
- Other post: Bishop of Uruguay (1988–1998)

Orders
- Ordination: 1972 (deacon); 1973 (priest)
- Consecration: 1987

Personal details
- Born: Harold William Godfrey; 21 April 1948
- Died: 13 January 2026 (aged 77)

Harold William Godfrey (21 April 1948 - 13 January 2026) was an Anglican bishop who was Bishop of Peru from 1998 to 2017.

He was educated at Chesterfield School, trained for the ministry at King's College London (AKC; Jelf Medal) and spent his last year there at St Augustine's College, Canterbury. He was Bishop of Uruguay from 1988 to 1998. He retired to Lastingham, where he ministered for a number of years before his death in 2026.
