= Jorge Luis Aguilar =

Peruvian bishop

Jorge Luis Aguilar is an Anglican Bishop: since 2017 he has been the Bishop of Peru.
