= Helen O'Brien =

British nightclub owner and spy (1925–2005)

- Born: Elena Constantinescu; 14 December 1925; Bucharest, Romania
- Died: 16 September 2005 (aged 79) near Valbonne, France
- Occupations: Nightclub owner and spy
- Spouses: Kenneth Archer (m. 1946; died 1946) Jimmy O'Brien (m. 1948; died 1994)
- Children: 2

Helen O'Brien (née Elena Constantinescu, 14 December 1925 – 16 September 2005) was a British spy and nightclub owner. The daughter of a landowner and an aristocrat, she escaped advancing Russians on the King's racehorse, fled the communists in Romania, and in 1953 co-founded what the press dubbed as a club with the most daring West London floor performances of its era, where she worked as a spy for the UK's MI5 and MI6.

== Early life ==
Helen O'Brien was born Elena Constantinescu on 14 December 1925, the daughter of a Romanian estate–owning father and an aristocratic mother who was the daughter of an exiled Russian duchess. She was born and grew up in Bucharest.

== First marriage ==
In early 1946, O'Brien married Kenneth Archer, an RAF officer. Archer was on his wife's arm when he was shot dead a month later by a British soldier who believed that there was a Russian behind the door. In 1944, she fled from the advancing Red Army on the King's racehorse. In 1947 she had to leave the country as a refugee, as landowners were not welcome under communism in Romania.

== London, second marriage and Eve nightclub ==
She made her way to London and found work at Murray's Cabaret Club in Beak Street, Soho as a cigarette girl and dancer where the general manager, Jimmy O'Brien who had started as a cloakroom attendant, became infatuated with her. They married in 1948. Together they opened a nightclub called Eve on nearby Regent Street on St Valentine's Day in 1953. As a members only club charging a guinea a year, it did not have to comply with the usual licensing laws and served alcohol until 3 am. Members included kings, ambassadors, sultans and a bishop who ran off with a club hostess. In 1954, she hosted John Profumo's stag night at the club.

As the hostess of Eve, Helen introduced topless girls and strippers to the club's entertainment, performing on the world's "first-ever illuminated glass floor" in what the press dubbed as the "most daring show" in London's West End. The club was known for "its unique appeal of glamour, intrigue, sex, sophistication, daring floorshows, and mystery".

The club was popular with senior civil servants and Eastern European diplomats, and, as O'Brien was anti-communist, she passed on information. She refused an offer from a Romanian secret agent to allow her parents to come to London if she would spy for them, and when she was spotted meeting Romanian embassy staff in 1958, she received an invitation from the War Office and was recruited by British intelligence. As well as Romanian and English, she was fluent in Russian. She was recruited into MI5 by Charles Elwell. When Helen's father was finally able to come to London, Elwell found him to be a "goldmine of intelligence" about Romania. She also worked for MI6.

== Later life ==
The club closed in 1992, and in 1993, they retired to the south of France. Jimmy died in 1994. Helen O'Brien died on 16 September 2005.

== Posthumous controversies ==
In a 2024 interview, former Romanian Intelligence Service colonel Tudor Păcuraru claimed that O'Brien was a double agent of the Securitate and that, when she was discharged, she was promoted to the rank of general.
