= Russell Barry =

Church of England Bishop

- Bishop of Southwell
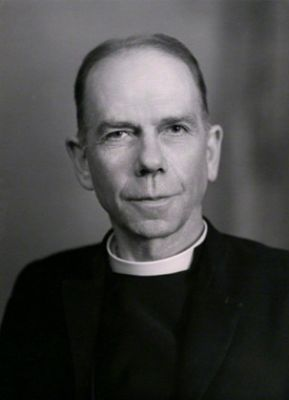
- Barry in 1948
- Diocese: Diocese of Southwell
- In office: 1941–1963
- Predecessor: Henry Mosley
- Successor: Gordon Savage
- Other posts: Archdeacon in Egypt (1923); Vicar of St Mary's, Oxford (1928–1933); Canon of Westminster (1933–1941)

Orders
- Ordination: 1914; 1915
- Consecration: 18 October 1941 by William Temple

Personal details
- Born: 28 January 1890 Rochester, Kent, UK
- Died: 24 October 1976 (aged 86) City of Westminster, UK
- Denomination: Anglican
- Parents: George Duncan Barry (priest)
- Spouse: Lilian Gray
- Children: One daughter
- Profession: Theologian (New Testament interpretation)
- Education: Oriel College, Oxford

Frank Russell Barry (28 January 1890 – 24 October 1976) was an Anglican bishop and author who served as Bishop of Southwell for over 20 years in the middle of the 20th century.

== Family and education ==
Born in Rochester, Kent, Barry was the son of another priest, George Duncan Barry, who served as curate of St Peter's Rochester then of St Mark's Surbiton, and was later Rector of Bratton Fleming; and his wife Edith née Reid; his brother was the journalist Gerald Barry. He was educated at Bradfield College before studying Classics (literae humaniores) at Oriel College, Oxford. He became a Fellow and Lecturer at Oriel in 1913, which role he retained throughout his wartime service, until his move to Oxford. He was made deacon on Trinity Sunday 1914 (7 June), then ordained priest the following Trinity (30 May 1915) — both times by Charles Gore, Bishop of Oxford, at Cuddesdon Parish Church; very exceptionally, he was not ordained to a title post but to officiate throughout the diocese. In 1929, he married Lilian Janet Gray; they had one child, a daughter.

== Wartime service ==
During the Great War he had two interviews for a commission as a Temporary Chaplain to the Forces. He was unsuccessful at his first interview in October, 1914, but was appointed in November, 1915. As TCF he was awarded the Distinguished Service Order and Mentioned in Despatches. The citation for his DSO referred to his actions near Mouquet Farm during the Battle of the Somme. 'For conspicuous gallantry and devotion to duty. He tended and dressed the wounded under very heavy fire with the greatest courage and determination. He set a splendid example throughout the operation'. He was also awarded the Montenegrin medal. During the War, he was part of the beginnings of what would become the Ordination Test School.

== Presbyteral ministry ==
Although only 28 when the War ended, Barry had been promoted from 4th Class to 2nd Class within the Chaplaincy and, in 1919, became Principal of Knutsford Ordination Test School. In 4 years, about 700 men would be trained for ordination, and they would serve as clergymen into the 1970s. In 1923, Barry was appointed Archdeacon in Egypt and Chaplain of All Saints', Cairo (Anglican Diocese of Egypt); but returned to England the same year to become Professor of New Testament Interpretation at King's College London. Later, in 1929, he was honoured with a Fellowship of King's College London (FKC).

In 1928, he left London to become Vicar of the University Church of St Mary the Virgin and a Fellow and Tutor of Balliol College, Oxford. He returned to London in 1933 to serve as a Canon of Westminster Abbey: throughout this time he was also Rector of St John's, Smith Square, and he additionally served as Sub-Dean of the Abbey from 1940 until his appointment as a bishop ended all of his Westminster roles. He was also a Chaplain to the King, 1930–1941, and Canon Theologian of Liverpool Cathedral, 1932–1933. On 10 May 1941, his house at Westminster Abbey, and all his possessions, were destroyed by a bomb while he was on watch at the Abbey.

== Episcopal ministry ==
Barry was appointed Bishop of Southwell, the diocesan bishop (Ordinary) of the Diocese of Southwell in 1941. He was duly consecrated to the episcopate on St Luke's Day, 18 October 1941, at York Minster, by William Temple, Archbishop of York. He served there for 22 years before retiring to Borrowdale; he resigned his See in October 1963. During his episcopate, his hearing loss worsened and he suffered depression; he was a notable liberal and theologically progressive on matters such as homosexuality and remarriage of divorcés.

== Death and legacy ==
In retirement, he divided his time between a house in the Lake District and a flat in Westminster, where he died on 24 October 1976, following a coronary in June that year. He was buried in Borrowdale churchyard rather than his further cathedral at Southwell Minster, where there is nonetheless a memorial plaque.

He was honoured by the universities of St Andrews and Nottingham and by Lambeth as a Doctor of Divinity. As an academic theologian, he was extensively published; as both writer and preacher, his specialism was the popular exposition of Christianity — his most noted work was The Relevance of Christianity (1931). In 1923, he was one of the authors — with his friend Mervyn Haigh — of A New Prayer Book (called the Grey Book), one of several proposed drafts in the development of the abortive 1928 prayer book. Barry also served on the archbishops' commission on doctrine starting in 1923.

Church of England titles
Preceded by Henry Mosley	Bishop of Southwell; 1941–1963	Succeeded by Gordon Savage
