= Henry Mosley (bishop) =

The Right Reverend Henry Mosley
- Bishop of Southwell
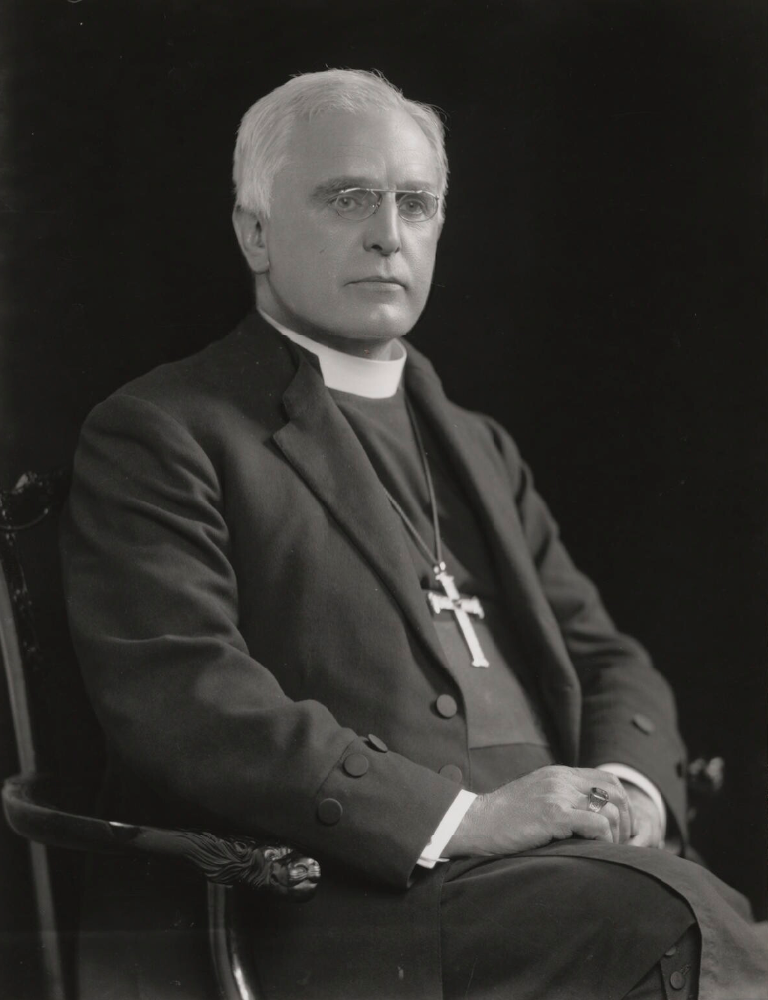
- Mosley in 1928
- Church: Church of England
- Diocese: Diocese of Southwell and Nottingham
- In office: 1928 to 1941
- Predecessor: Bernard Heywood
- Successor: Russell Barry

Orders
- Ordination: 1893
- Consecration: 1919

Personal details
- Born: 1868
- Died: 1948 (aged 79–80)
- Denomination: Anglicanism
- Education: Keble College, Oxford

Henry Mosley (1868–1948) was an Anglican cleric who was Bishop of Stepney from 1919 to 1928 and Bishop of Southwell from 1928 to 1941.

== Early life ==
Mosley was born at Newcastle-under-Lyme, Staffordshire, the son of Henry Mosley. He was educated at Newcastle-under-Lyme High School and matriculated at Keble College, Oxford on 17 October 1887. He was awarded a Bachelor of Arts (BA) degree in 1890.

== Ordained ministry ==
Mosley was ordained in the Church of England in 1893. He began with a curacy at Bethnal Green and held a succession of inner city posts in the east of London. He was with the Trinity Stratford Mission and became Rector of Poplar. He was then at Hackney and Stoke Newington and became Rural Dean. In 1919 he was appointed the suffragan Bishop of Stepney. He was appointed Bishop of Southwell in 1928. He retired in 1941 and served on the Council for the Church and the Countryside from 1943 to 1944.

== Personal life ==
Mosley married Mildred Willis, daughter of Edmund Willis, curate of Horsham, in 1908. Together, they had two children. Their son Michael MC (1912–1942) was killed in action at the battle of El Alamein. Their daughter, Mildred Betty (1909–2005), who married Michael Ridley (vicar of Pimlico and Finchley), became one of the most senior lay persons in the Church of England as the Third Church Estates Commissioner.

Mosley died in the Kingsclere district in 1948.

Church of England titles
Preceded by Luke Paget	Bishop of Stepney; 1919–1928	Succeeded by Charles Curzon
Preceded by Bernard Heywood	Bishop of Southwell; 1928–1941	Succeeded by Russell Barry
