= Brian Williams (bishop) =

Anglican bishop in Argentina

The Most Reverend Brian Williams
- Presiding Bishop of the Anglican Church of South America; Bishop of Argentina
- Church: Anglican Church of South America
- Diocese: Argentina
- In office: 2020–present
- Predecessor: Gregory Venables

Orders
- Ordination: 1996 (diaconate); 1997 (priesthood)
- Consecration: November 28, 2020 by Gregory Venables

Personal details
- Born: Buenos Aires

Brian Roger Williams is an Argentine Anglican bishop. Since 2020, he has been diocesan bishop of the Diocese of Argentina in the Anglican Church of South America, and since 2023 he has been presiding bishop of the province.

== Biography ==
Williams was born and raised in Buenos Aires. Prior to his consecration as bishop, Williams was rector of the rapidly growing Iglesia de San Miguel y Todos los Ángeles in the Buenos Aires suburb of Martínez.

On November 28, 2020, Williams was consecrated as bishop at Iglesia de San Miguel by the outgoing Bishop Gregory Venables. He was installed at the Anglican Cathedral of St. John the Baptist in Buenos Aires by Presiding Bishop Nick Drayson in December 2021. When Drayson retired in 2023, Williams succeeded him as primate of the province, initially on an acting basis. As presiding bishop, he attended the 2024 Primates Meeting in Rome.

Anglican Communion titles
Preceded by Gregory Venables	Bishop of Argentina; 2020–present	Incumbent
Preceded by Nick Drayson	Presiding Bishop of the Anglican Church of South America; 2023–present	Incumbent
