= Eve (nightclub) =

Nightclub in London, England, 1953–1991

- Formation: 1953
- Founder: Jimmy O'Brien, Helen O'Brien
- Dissolved: 1991
- Type: Nightclub
- Coordinates: 51.5120°N 0.1403°W

Eve was a private members' nightclub at 189 Regent Street, central London. Founded in 1953, it had the world's first illuminated glass floor and, according to The Daily Telegraph, the "most daring show" in London's West End, including topless girls and strippers.

Members included kings, ambassadors, sultans and a bishop. It was popular with diplomats and senior civil servants, and was known for "its unique appeal of glamour, intrigue, sex, sophistication, daring floorshows and mystery". The Romanian-born co-owner and hostess, Helen O'Brien, worked as a spy for Britain's MI5.

== Origin ==
Jimmy O'Brien had been a cloakroom attendant and later the manager of Murray's Cabaret Club in nearby Beak Street, where he met his future wife, the Romanian-born Elena Constantinescu (later Helen O'Brien), who worked there as a cigarette girl and dancer. Together, they opened Eve on St Valentine's Day in 1953. Although the address was 189 Regent Street, it was in the basement with the entrance down an alleyway in New Burlington Place.

As the hostess of Eve, Helen introduced topless girls and strippers to the club's entertainment, performing on the world's "first-ever illuminated glass floor" in what the press dubbed the "most daring show" in London's West End. She also worked as a spy for Britain's MI5 and MI6.

== Membership ==
As a members-only club charging a guinea a year, it did not have to comply with the usual licensing laws and served alcohol until 3 am. Members included kings, ambassadors, sultans, and a bishop. Customers included Judy Garland, Frank Sinatra, Shirley Bassey, and Errol Flynn. In 1954, Helen hosted John Profumo's stag night at the club. It was popular with diplomats and senior civil servants and was a hotbed of intrigue.

== Closure ==
Eve closed in 1991, and the O'Briens spent their retirement at a villa in the south of France.
