= Douglas Milmine =

British Anglican bishop

Douglas Milmine CBE
- Bishop of Paraguay
- Church: Church of England
- In office: 1973–1985

Orders
- Ordination: 1947

Personal details
- Born: 3 May 1921
- Died: 28 February 2017 (aged 95)
- Spouse: Margaret Rosalind Whitley
- Children: 4

Douglas Milmine CBE (3 May 1921 – 28 February 2017) was the Anglican Bishop of Paraguay from 1973 to 1985.

== Education ==
Milmine was educated at Sutton Valence School and St Peter's Hall, Oxford; and was ordained in 1947.

== War service ==
Milmine served in the Royal Air Force Reserves from 1941 to 1945. In 1943, while commanding a Halifax bomber, he was shot down over Germany. He evaded capture for several days, heading overland into the Netherlands, where he was captured. He was held as a Prisoner of War in Stalag Luft III until the end of the war. He later told his school's magazine "Actually, it wasn't that bad – if you could survive boarding at an English public school then you could survive prison camp!"

== Ministry ==
Milmine began his ordained ministry with curacies at St Philip and St James in Ilfracombe and St Paul's at Slough.

In 1954 he moved to South America where he served in Chile, Bolivia and Peru and finally (until his ordination to the episcopate) as Archdeacon of North Chile, Bolivia and Peru.

On his return to England, Milmine retired to Eastbourne, and served as an Assistant Bishop in the Diocese of Chichester.

== Personal life ==
Milmine married Margaret Rosalind "Ros" Whitley in 1945; and they had 4 children, 13 grandchildren and 13 great grandchildren. She died in 2018 at the age of 97.

Milmine died on 28 February 2017 at the age of 95.

Anglican Communion titles
Preceded by Bill Flagg	Bishop of Paraguay; 1973–1985	Succeeded by John Ellison
