= George Henry Cassidy =

British Anglican bishop (1942–2024)

The Right Reverend George Cassidy
- Bishop of Southwell and Nottingham
- Church: Church of England
- Diocese: Southwell and Nottingham
- In office: 1999 – 31 August 2009
- Predecessor: Patrick Harris
- Successor: Paul Butler
- Other post: Archdeacon of London (1987–1999)

Orders
- Ordination: 1972
- Consecration: 1999

Personal details
- Born: 17 October 1942
- Died: 29 March 2024 (aged 81)
- Denomination: Anglican
- Parents: Joseph Abram Cassidy & Ethel McDonald
- Spouse: Jane Barling Stevens (m. 1966)
- Children: 2 daughters
- Education: Queen's University, Belfast; University College London

Member of the House of Lords
- Lord Spiritual
- Bishop of Southwell and Nottingham; 21 January 2004 – 31 August 2009

George Henry Cassidy (17 October 1942 – 29 March 2024) was a British Anglican bishop. He served as Bishop of Southwell and Nottingham from 1999 to 2009.

== Early life and education ==
The son of Joseph Abram Cassidy and Ethel McDonald, Cassidy was educated at Belfast High School and Queen's University, Belfast, where he received a Bachelor of Science degree in politics and economics in 1965. He was further educated in University College, London, where he graduated with a Master of Philosophy degree in 1967.

Cassidy worked as planning officer in the Ministry of Development of Northern Ireland from 1967 to 1968 and in the Department of Lands and Settlements, Kenya from 1968 to 1970.

== Ordained ministry ==
He trained for ordained ministry with the Church of England at Oak Hill Theological College, London and was ordained in 1972. From 1972 to 1975 he was curate of Christ Church, Clifton, from 1975 to 1982 the vicar of St Edyth's, Sea Mills and of St Paul's, Portman Square, London from 1982 to 1987. From 1987 to 1999, he was Archdeacon of London and a canon residentiary of St Paul's Cathedral. Having been appointed the 10th Bishop of Southwell in 1999, in 2005 the territorial designation of Nottingham was added to his position. On 9 May 2008, it was announced that Cassidy would retire, and, in July 2009, he formally retired. From 2011 he served as an assistant bishop in the Diocese of Bath and Wells, having settled in Stogursey, Somerset.

=== Views ===
Cassidy spent much of his time in the House of Lords, where he voted against the Equality Act in early 2007. He was also one of the rebel bishops who signed a letter against Rowan Williams' decision not to block the appointment of Jeffrey John as Bishop of Reading in 2003. The other diocesan bishop signatories (referred to by their opponents, since there were nine, as the Nazgûl) were: Michael Scott-Joynt (Bishop of Winchester), Michael Langrish (Exeter), Michael Nazir-Ali (Rochester), Peter Forster (Chester), James Jones (Liverpool), Graham Dow (Carlisle), John Hind (Chichester) and David James (Bradford).

== Personal life and death ==
Cassidy received an honorary doctorate from Heriot-Watt University in 2005.

From 1966, Cassidy was married to Jane Barling Stevens; they had two daughters. He died on 29 March 2024, at the age of 81.
