= Richard Adams (architect) =

Scottish painter and architect (1791–1835)

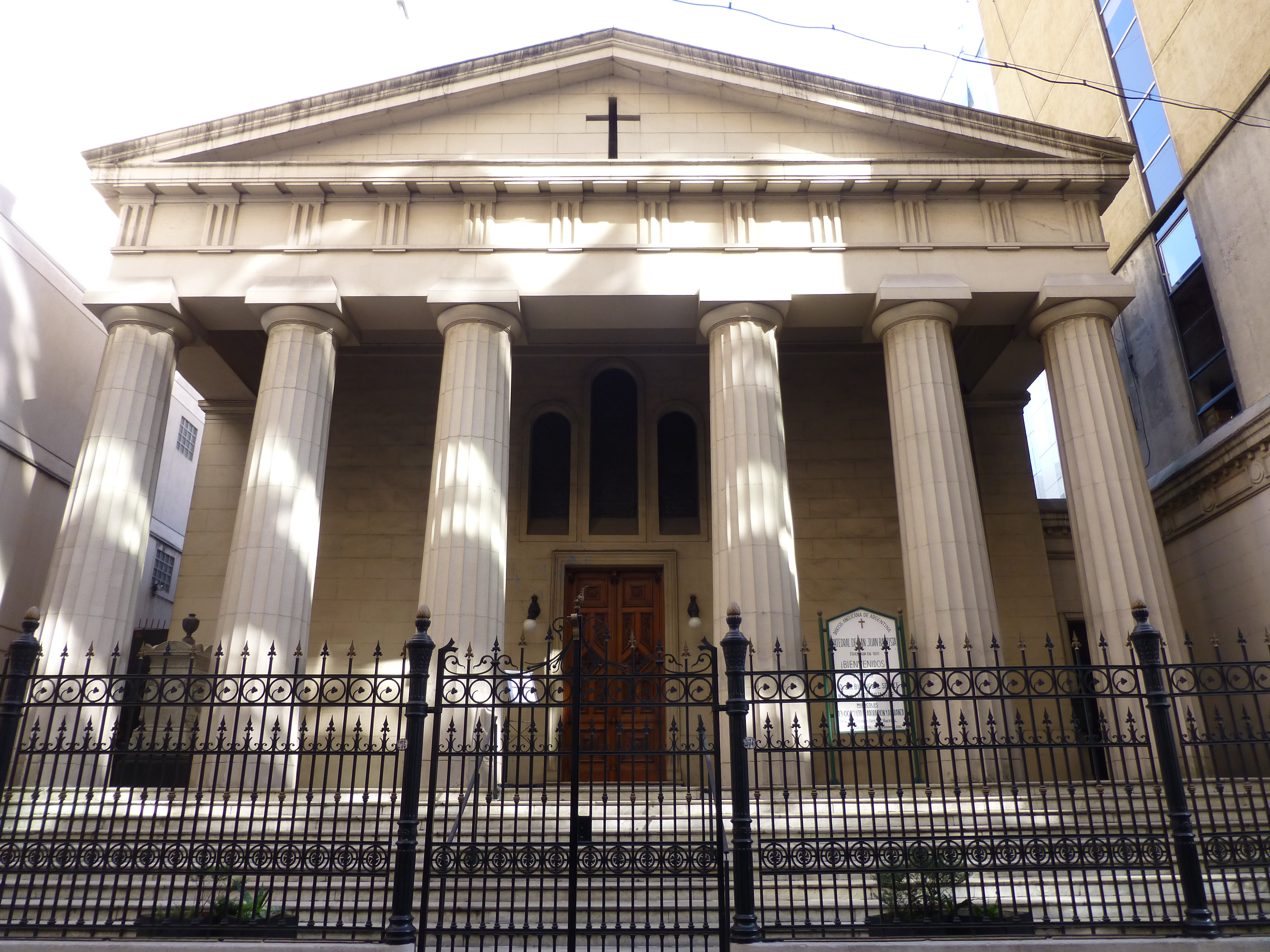
- facade of Catedral Anglicana de San Juan Bautista

Personal details
- Born: 1791 Scotland
- Died: 1835 (aged 43–44) Buenos Aires, Argentina
- Occupation: painter
- Profession: architect

Richard Adams (1791–1835) was a Scottish painter and architect, who built the Anglican Cathedral of St. John the Baptist of Buenos Aires.

== Biography ==
He was born in Scotland, and arrived in Buenos Aires in 1825, along with a group of Scottish settlers. His first job in Argentina was the construction of housing for the settlers in the Santa Catalina, (now Llavallol).

Richard Adams was the architect of the Cathedral of St. John the Baptist, the first Anglican temple of South America. He also built the Presbyterian Church of St. Andrew's for the Scottish community of Argentina.
