= John Ellison (bishop) =

British Anglican bishop (1940–2019)

The Right Reverend John Ellison
- Bishop of Paraguay
- Province: Province of the Southern Cone of America
- Diocese: Diocese of Paraguay
- In office: 1988 to 2007
- Predecessor: Douglas Milmine
- Successor: Peter Bartlett

Orders
- Ordination: 1967 (deacon); 1968 (priest)
- Consecration: 1988

Personal details
- Born: John Alexander Ellison; 24 December 1940
- Died: 5 August 2019 (aged 78) Basingstoke and Deane, England
- Denomination: Anglicanism

John Alexander Ellison (24 December 1940 – 5 August 2019) was a British Anglican bishop. He was the Bishop of Paraguay from 1988 to 2007.

== Early life and education ==
Ellison was born on 24 December 1940 to Alexander and Catherine Ellison. He was educated at the London College of Divinity, an Anglican theological college, and at the Borough Road College, a teacher training college.

== Ordained ministry ==
Ellison was ordained in the Church of England as a deacon in 1967 and as a priest in 1968. From 1967 to 1970, he served his curacy at St Paul's Church, Woking in the Diocese of Guildford. In 1971, he joined the South American Mission Society (SAMS). From 1971 to 1979, he worked as a missionary, church planter, evangelist and Bible school instructor in South America. From 1980 to 1983, he was a curate of St Saviours' Church, Belgrano, Buenos Aires, Argentina, and an assistant to the archdeacon. From 1983 to 1988, having returned to England, he was Rector of the Church of St Mary the Virgin, Aldridge (also known as Aldridge Parish Church) in the Diocese of Lichfield.

Ellison was consecrated a bishop in 1988. From 1988 to 2007, he served as the Bishop of Paraguay in the Province of the Southern Cone of America. Having retired, he was an honorary assistant bishop in the Diocese of Winchester.

=== Controversy ===
Ellison was Chair of Panel of Bishops of the Anglican Mission in England (AMiE). Members of the executive of AMiE are required to hold complementarian views. AMiE has links with GAFCON and is missionary organisation that supports conservative evangelical Anglican churches within and outside of the Church of England. In February 2015, it was announced that Ellison was being investigated by the Bishop of Salisbury for his involvement in an AMiE church plant in the Diocese of Salisbury. The diocese stated: "No one involved in planting the church has contacted the Bishop, nor is the Diocese aware of any consultation with Churches Together in Salisbury about the need for a church plan. ... The Bishop of Salisbury is seeking clarification about the involvement of Bishop John Ellison in the December service."

== Personal life ==
In 1964, Ellison married Judith Mary Cox. Together they had three children: one son and two daughters.

Ellison died at his home near Basingstoke on 5 August 2019.

Anglican Communion titles
Preceded by Douglas Milmine	Bishop of Paraguay; 1988–2007	Succeeded by Peter Bartlett
