= William Lloyd (engineer) =

British railway engineer

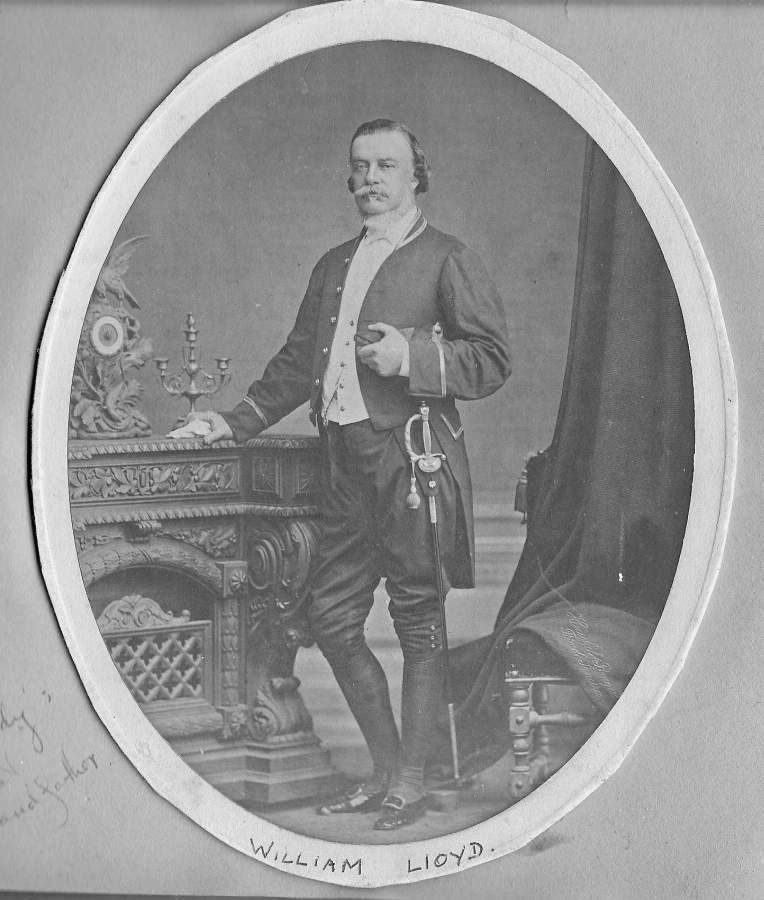
- Born: 12 October 1822
- Died: 15 July 1905 (aged 82); London, England
- Engineering career
- Discipline: Civil engineer Structural engineer
- Institutions: Institute of Civil Engineers
- Awards: Telford Medal

William Lloyd (12 October 1822 – 15 July 1905) was a British railway engineer who was instrumental in the construction of several railways in the Americas.

== Career ==
William Lloyd started his engineering career while serving five years pupilage to Joseph Gibbs. He was given this position by Gibbs to make a survey of ironworks at Marquise in France and to lay out a railway line to the port of Ambleteuse. After completing this line he was given the post of Resident Engineer on a section of the French Northern Railway. He returned to England in 1844 where he worked on various rail projects for eight years under George Stephenson and George Parker Bidder.

In 1853 he was employed by the Swedish Government Railways to undertake surveys and was elected a member of the Institution of Civil Engineers (ICE) on 7 March 1854

In 1863, on the recommendation of Robert Stephenson, Lloyd was appointed engineer to the government of Chile to carry out construction of railways in Chile and Peru, including the Santiago to Valparaiso line. An account of this construction was presented to the ICE in 1864 and he was awarded a Telford medal and premium for this.

When the Chilean Railway was completed in 1864, William Lloyd was appointed director for the construction of a Mexican railway. The line was to be 300 miles long starting from Mexico City and finishing in Veracruz and featured a gradient of 1:25 for some 23 miles. Most of the line was completed until the Mexican Revolution stopped further work.

Lloyd went on to complete projects in Argentina and Guatemala as well as undertaking an extensive exploration and survey for the Brazilian Government. This project was 1,000 miles in length from Curitibe to Mato Grosso, going through unknown and dense primeval forest. A copy of this report and survey is also in the ICE Library.

In 1881 Lloyd became director of the Valparaiso Drainage Company, completing many works within the city. An Anglican church constructed in 1858 called Iglesia Anglicana de San Pablo, which stands on the Cerro Concepcion, was built by Lloyd. This church was made a national monument in 1979.

In 1888, Lloyd went to California and Arizona reporting on the mines in these states.

He returned home to St Johns Wood, London where he died on 15 July 1905 at the age of 82.

He wrote a book titled A railway pioneer : Notes by a civil engineer in Europe and America from 1838 to 1888.

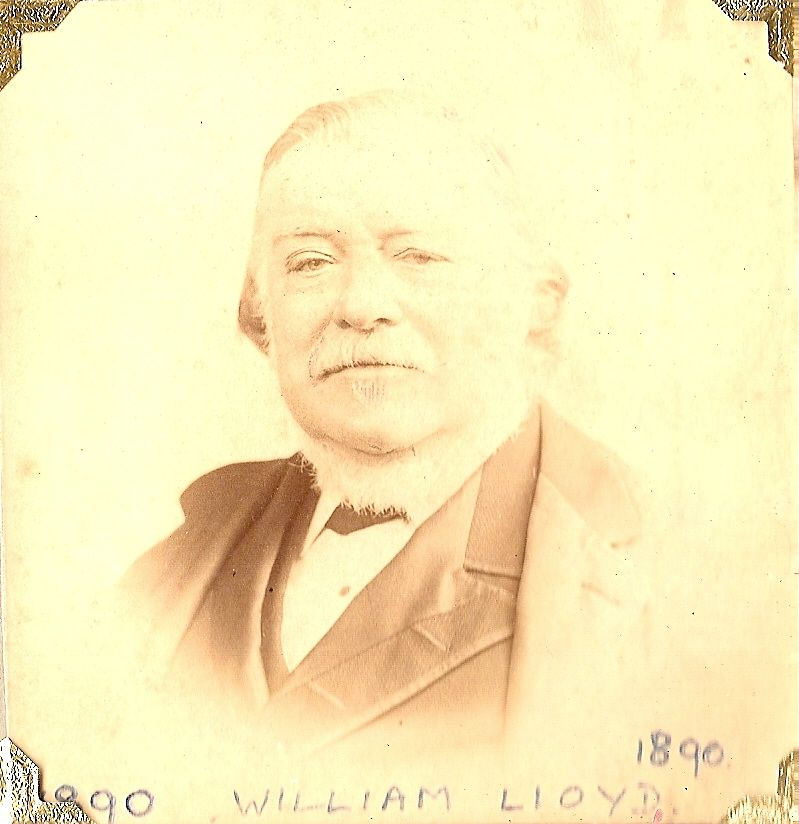
