= Cristiano Rojas =

Argentine bishop

Cristiano Rojas is a Wichí Anglican Suffragan Bishop in Northern Argentina.
