= David Pytches =

20th and 21st-century Anglican bishop (1931–2023)

- Bishop of Chile, Bolivia and Peru
- Diocese: Diocese of Chile, Bolivia and Peru
- In office: 1972–1976
- Predecessor: Kenneth Walter Howell
- Successor: Colin Bazley
- Other posts: Assistant bishop in Valparaíso (1970–1972); Vicar of St Andrew's Church, Chorleywood, Hertfordshire (1976–1996)

Orders
- Ordination: 1955
- Consecration: 20 December 1970

Personal details
- Born: 9 January 1931 Suffolk, England
- Died: 21 November 2023 (aged 92)

George Edward David Pytches (9 January 1931 – 21 November 2023) was an English bishop of the Anglican Communion. He served as the Bishop of Chile, Bolivia and Peru. Pytches was also vicar of St Andrew's, in Chorleywood, England. He was the author of many books, including Come Holy Spirit and his autobiography, Living at the Edge. He was the founder of the New Wine conferences with his wife Mary, who is also an author in the field of Christian counselling.

Pytches was consecrated a bishop on 20 December 1970, by Kenneth Walter Howell, Bishop of Chile, Bolivia and Peru, in St Paul's Church, Valparaíso, to serve as assistant bishop for the Valparaíso region in the Diocese of Chile, Bolivia and Peru; in 1972 he became diocesan bishop of that diocese, serving until his return to England in 1977. Until 1996 he was Vicar of St Andrew's, Chorleywood, Hertfordshire, where he later lived in retirement by 2012.

Pytches supported the Soul Survivor movement in England during its early days and throughout its history; for example, the Soul in the City event was supported by a large donation received from a New Wine conference only days before.

Pytches, along with Bishop C. FitzSimons Allison and four others, participated in the consecration in 2000, in Singapore, of two bishops opposed to the blessing of same-sex unions by the Episcopal Church USA.

Pytches and his wife gave the leadership of New Wine over to John and Anne Coles in 2001, but still visited the conferences every year and continued to speak there.

Pytches's son-in-law, Christopher Cocksworth, was Bishop of Coventry from March 2008 until October 2023 and is now the Dean of Windsor.

David Pytches died on 21 November 2023, at the age of 92.

== Books ==
- Pastoral Prayer Ministry Training
- Prophecy In The Local Church
- Leadership For New Life
- Does God Speak Today?
- Some Said It Thundered:A Personal Encounter with the Kansas City Prophets (1991)
- Come Holy Spirit: Learning How to Minister in Power (with John Wimber) (1994)
- John Wimber: a Tribute
- Spiritual Gifts in the Local Church
- Living at the Edge (2002)
- Can Anyone Be A Leader? (2004)
- Upside Down: Living the Beatitudes in the 21st Century (2007)
