= David Leake =

David Leake CBE (born 26 June 1935) was the assistant Bishop in Northern Argentina from 1969 to 1979 when he became diocesan Bishop, and, for the latter part of that post, also Primate of the Southern Cone.

Born to missionary parents serving in Argentina, he was ordained in the Church of England and began his career with a curacy in Watford. He was made a deacon at Michaelmas 1959 (20 September) and ordained a priest the Michaelmas following (25 September 1960), both times by Michael Gresford Jones, Bishop of St Albans, at St Albans Cathedral.

In 1963 he went to South America where he served the Church as a Missionary eventually being appointed to the episcopate. He was ordained and consecrated a bishop on St Thomas' Day 1969 (21 December) to serve as Bishop in Northern Argentina, assistant bishop of the newly-erected Diocese of Paraguay and Northern Argentina. As of 2013, in retirement he continues to serve the church as an honorary assistant bishop in the Diocese of Norwich. and also serves as a consultant to the Argentine Bible Society specialising in the Toba language translation of the Toba (oeste) New Testament. On retirement he was awarded the honour of Commander of the Order of the British Empire in the 2003 New Year Honours.

Church of England titles
Preceded by Patrick Harris	Bishop of Northern Argentina; 1979 –1989	Succeeded by Maurice Sinclair
