= St. Paul's Cathedral, Valparaíso =

Anglican cathedral in Chile

Cathedral of St. Paul
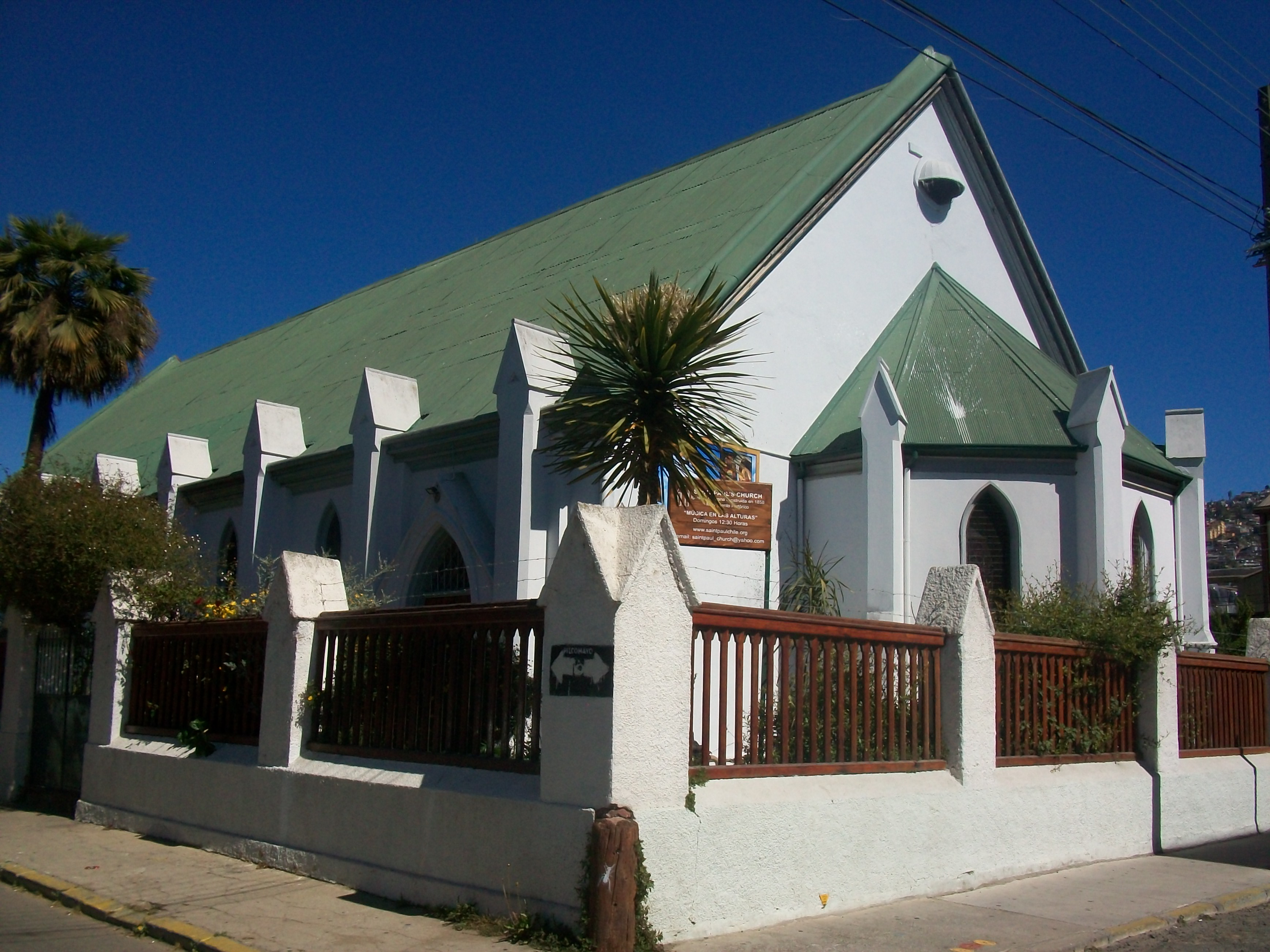
- Cathedral of St. Paul
- 33.04234°S 71.62723°W
- Denomination: Anglican
- Churchmanship: Anglican Church of Chile
- Website: saintpaulchile.cl

History
- Founded: 1837

Architecture
- Heritage designation: Monumento Nacional (Supreme Decree #1876, July 19, 1979)
- Architect: William Lloyd
- Architectural type: Gothic Revival
- Years built: 1857–1858

Administration
- Diocese: Valparaíso

Clergy
- Rector: Simon Brignall

St. Paul's Cathedral (Spanish: Catedral de San Pablo) is a historic Anglican church in Valparaíso, Chile. Located in Cerro Concepción in the historic British section of Valparaíso, St. Paul's has been a National Monument of Chile since 1979 and a cathedral since 2016.

== History ==
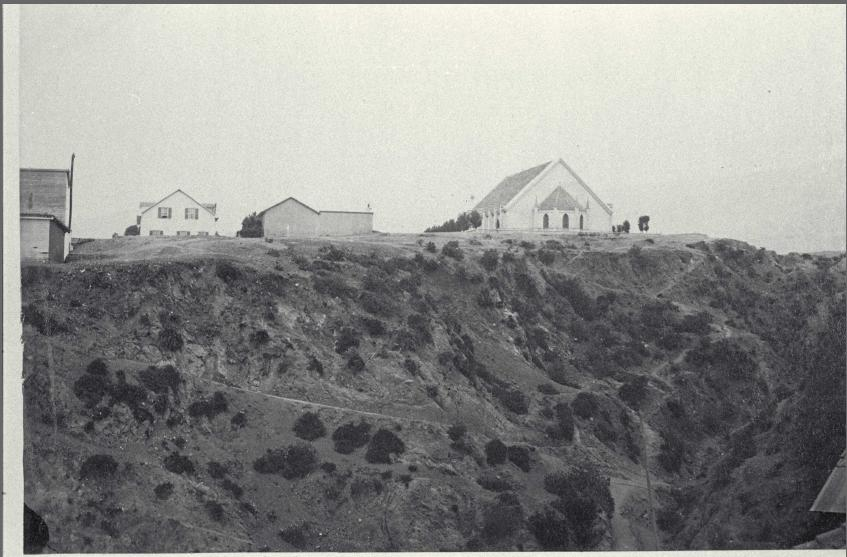
St. Paul's Church pictured in 1863.

St. Paul's began in 1837 as a house church serving the British expatriate community in the cosmopolitan port city of Valparaíso, with divine services conducted by traveling Anglican chaplains. At the time and until 1865, Chilean law restricted all faiths but Catholicism, but in 1857—amid the growing influence and wealth of the British expat population—Anglicans were permitted to build a church in Cerro Concepción. British Consul William Rouse led efforts to raise funds for the new church.

However, due to the restrictions on religious liberty, the building was not permitted features like a steeple or a tower that would indicate it was a church, and its doors were not allowed to be larger than any of the local Catholic churches' doors, resulting in worshipers entering through a side door. The building was designed by English architect and engineer William Henry Lloyd, who was in Chile to build the Santiago–Valparaíso railway line. The church was repaired by Carlos Federico Claussen after the 1906 earthquake.

On March 19, 2016, the church was declared a cathedral by the Anglican Diocese of Chile, thus becoming the first Anglican cathedral in the country. On June 5, 2022, St. Paul's hosted a service celebrating Queen Elizabeth II's Platinum Jubilee. The service was presided over by Samuel Morrison, the Anglican bishop of Valparaíso, and attended by Louise de Souza, the British ambassador to Chile.

=== Monument status ===
Since July 19, 1979, St. Paul's has been recognized as a historic monument by the Council of National Monuments of Chile. It is also a contributor to the UNESCO World Heritage Site comprising Valparaíso's historic quarter.

== Architecture ==
The exterior of the cathedral remains modest in appearance, with no tower or prominent entrance. A three-sided baptistry protrudes on the liturgical east end of the church. The building's interior, whose present-day appearance dates to 1883, has a long single nave illuminated with lancet windows; the roof is supported by exposed wooden trusses. A half-height wooden tracery rood screen separates the nave from the choir. In 1903, a pneumatic water-powered pipe organ was purchased for the church in memory of Queen Victoria. The stained glass windows of St. Paul's were imported from the United Kingdom. Two plaques commemorate the porteños of British origin who died in World War I.

== Music ==
Since 1995, to raise awareness of the church's restoration needs, St. Paul's has hosted weekly Sunday afternoon organ concerts. The concert series, called “Música en las alturas,” is the only regular series of organ performances in Chile.
