= Bishop of Southwell and Nottingham =

Diocesan bishop in the Church of England

The Bishop of Southwell and Nottingham is the diocesan bishop of the Church of England Diocese of Southwell and Nottingham in the Province of York.

The diocese covers 847 square miles (2,190 km^{2}) including the whole of Nottinghamshire and a small area of South Yorkshire. The see is in the town of Southwell where the seat is located at the Cathedral and Collegiate Church of the Blessed Virgin Mary (also known as Southwell Minster), which was elevated to cathedral status in 1884. The bishop's residence is Bishop's Manor, Southwell — in the minster precincts.

The diocese was created in 1884. Until 2005 it was known simply by the name "Southwell"; Nottingham was added to the title in that year. The current bishop is Paul Williams, whose election was confirmed on 11 May 2015. There are 314 church buildings in the Diocese.

The bishop is assisted by the suffragan Bishop of Sherwood, the current incumbent being Andy Emerton.

== List of bishops ==
Bishops of Southwell
From	Until	Incumbent	Notes
1884	1904	George Ridding	Formerly Headmaster of Winchester College
1904	1925	Edwyn Hoskyns	Died in post.
1926	1928	Bernard Heywood	Resigned in ill health; became an assistant bishop in York then Bishop suffragan of Hull and later Bishop of Ely
1928	1941	Henry Mosley	Formerly Bishop of Stepney
1941	1964	Russell Barry	
1964	1970	Gordon Savage	Formerly Bishop of Buckingham
1970	1985	Denis Wakeling	
1985	1988	Michael Whinney	Formerly Bishop of Aston
1988	1999	Patrick Harris	Formerly Bishop of Northern Argentina and Secretary of the Partnership for World Mission.
1999	2005	George Cassidy	Enthroned 11 September 1999; See translated to "Southwell and Nottingham" in 2005.
Bishops of Southwell and Nottingham
From	Until	Incumbent	Notes
2005	2009	George Cassidy	
2010	20 January 2014	Paul Butler	Formerly Bishop of Southampton; translated to Durham on 20 January 2014.
11 May 2015	present	Paul Williams	Previously area Bishop of Kensington.

== Assistant bishops ==
Among those called Assistant Bishop of Southwell:

- 1901 – 1913 (res.): Hamilton Baynes, Vicar of Nottingham, former Bishop of Natal and later Assistant Bishop and Provost of Birmingham
- 1934 – 1943 (d.): Neville Talbot, Vicar of St Mary's, Nottingham and former Bishop of Pretoria
- 1944 – 1945 (res.): Douglas Wilson, former Bishop of British Honduras; became Bishop of Trinidad
- 1946 – 1952: John Weller, Vicar of Edwalton (until 1949), Rector of Holme Pierrepont (from 1951) and former Bishop of the Falkland Islands and in Argentina and Eastern South America
- November 1952 – 1968 (death): Morris Gelsthorpe, former Bishop in Sudan
- 1960–1971 (ret.): Mark Way, Rector of Averham, former Bishop of Masasi
- 1972–1977 (ret.): Bernard Markham, Rector of East Bridgford, former Bishop of Nassau

== See also ==
- Anglican Bishop of Nottingham
