= Tito Zavala =

Chilean Anglican bishop

The Most Reverend Tito Zavala
- Archbishop of the Anglican Church of Chile; Bishop of Santiago
- Church: Anglican Church of Chile
- Diocese: Santiago
- In office: 2018–2025
- Predecessor: First incumbent
- Successor: Enrique Lago
- Other posts: Presiding Bishop of the Anglican Church of South America (2010–2016); Bishop of Santiago (2018–2025); Bishop of Chile (2000–2018)

Orders
- Ordination: 1982 (deacon); 1984 (priest)
- Consecration: 1998 by Maurice Sinclair

Personal details
- Born: October 16, 1954 (age 71)

Héctor "Tito" Zavala Muñoz (born 16 October 1954) is a Chilean Anglican bishop. He was the first native Bishop of the Anglican Diocese of Chile and later the first Latin American presiding bishop of the Anglican Church of the Southern Cone of America, renamed in 2014 as the Anglican Church of South America. When the new Anglican Church of Chile was inaugurated in 2018 he became its first presiding bishop, also known as Archbishop by the Anglican Communion News Service. He is married to Miriam and they have three adult children.

== Early life ==
Zavala was raised in a Roman Catholic family, of nominal faith, with limited religious practice. He received the sacraments of Baptism and First Communion, and attended a Roman Catholic school. He has said that the first time he heard the Gospel clearly preached, and held a Bible in his hands, was when he visited an Anglican church, aged 17, at the invitation of a friend. He subsequently converted to Anglicanism.

== Ecclesiastical career ==
He studied at the Trinity Episcopal School for Ministry, in Pittsburgh, United States, and was ordained deacon in 1982, and priest in 1984. In 1998 he was consecrated as coadjutor bishop of Chile, with the right of succession to the episcopal see. He became the diocesan bishop in 2000. He was elected unanimously to be the first Latin American and Chilean Presiding Bishop of the Anglican Church in the Southern Cone of America, at the 10th Provincial Synod held in Buenos Aires, Argentina, from 2–5 November 2010. He served for two three year terms, being re-elected in 2013, and stood down in 2016.

In early 2018 his diocese of Chile was split into four dioceses, whereupon he became the Bishop of Santiago. On 4 November 2018 the four Chilean dioceses were inaugurated as a new province of the Anglican Communion, named the Anglican Church of Chile. Zavala was commissioned by Archbishop Justin Welby, Archbishop of Canterbury, as the first primate of the new province.

== Views ==
He has been a keen supporter of Anglican realignment, as a member of the Fellowship of Confessing Anglicans and the Global South Primates Council. He attended the GAFCON II meeting, in Nairobi, Kenya, from 21–26 October 2013.

Anglican Communion titles
Preceded by Colin Bazley	Bishop of Chile; Bishop of Santiago; 2000–2025	Succeeded by Juan Esteban Saravia
Preceded by Gregory Venables	Presiding Bishop of the Anglican Church of the Southern Cone of America; 2010–2016	Succeeded by Gregory Venables
New title	Archbishop of the Anglican Church of Chile; 2018–2025	Succeeded by Enrique Lago
