= Peter Bartlett (bishop) =

Anglican bishop

Peter Bartlett is the former Anglican Bishop of Paraguay, appointed in September 2008. Born in 1954 and ordained in 1997, he began his ecclesiastical career in Bolivia. From 2005 until his elevation to the episcopate he was Team Vicar of Parr, St Helens in England.

== Notes ==
Church of England titles
Preceded by John Alexander Ellison	Bishop of Paraguay; 2008 –	Succeeded by Current Incumbent
