= Samuel Morrison (bishop) =

Chilean Anglican bishop

The Right Reverend Samuel Morrison
- 1st Bishop of Valparaíso
- Church: Anglican Church of Chile
- Diocese: Valparaíso
- In office: 2018–2023

Orders
- Consecration: July 15, 2018 by Gregory Venables

Samuel Morrison Munro is a Chilean Anglican bishop.

Consecrated in 2018 at St. Paul's Cathedral, he was the first diocesan bishop of Valparaíso in the Anglican Church of Chile following the church's recognition as the 40th province of the Anglican Communion.

In 2023, Morrison was a delegate to the fourth Global Anglican Future Conference and served on the drafting committee for the conference communique, known as the Kigali Commitment. Morrison retired as bishop of Valparaíso later in 2023 and began working with the Latimer Trust on translations of Anglican educational materials into Spanish.

== Personal life ==
Morrison has described himself as a fourth-generation member of an Anglican family in Chile. He is married to Viviana and they have four children and three grandchildren.
