= Abelino Manuel Apeleo =

Chilean Anglican bishop

The Right Reverend Abelino Apeleo
- Bishop of Araucanía
- Church: Anglican Church of Chile
- Diocese: Araucanía
- In office: 2018–2022
- Successor: Joel Millanguir
- Other post: Auxiliary bishop of Chile

Personal details
- Born: June 8, 1951
- Died: August 4, 2026 (aged 75) Galvarino, Araucanía, Chile

Abelino Manuel Apeleo Puel (June 8, 1951 – August 4, 2026) was an indigenous Chilean Anglican bishop. Previously the auxiliary bishop for the Araucanía Region, he served from 2018 to 2022 as the first diocesan bishop of the Anglican Diocese of Araucanía, centered on Temuco in the 40th province of the Anglican Communion, the Anglican Church of Chile.

Abelino retired as bishop of Araucanía in January 2022 after more than 40 years of ordained ministry. He was a member of the Mapuche indigenous people group. Abelino died of a heart attack on August 4, 2026, in the rural area of Hilohue in Galvarino, Araucanía.
