= Mateo Alto =

Argentinian Bishop

Mateo Alto is a Qom Anglican Suffragan Bishop in Northern Argentina.
