= Alan Winstanley (bishop) =

Alan Leslie Winstanley (born 7 May 1949) was the Bishop of Peru and Bolivia from 1988 to 1993.

Winstanley was educated at St John's College, Nottingham and ordained in 1973. He began his ordained ministry with curacies in Blackburn and Liverpool. He was vicar of Penketh from 1978 to 1981. He was a South American Mission Society missionary in Lima (1981–1985) then Arequipa (1986–1987) before his ordination to the episcopate; and vicar of Eastham, Whittle-le-Woods and Shirwell afterwards. He is now an assistant bishop in the Diocese of Chester, having also served in that role in Exeter and Blackburn dioceses.
