= Bill Flagg (bishop) =

John William Hawkins Flagg was an Anglican missionary bishop from 1951 to 1977; and was later general secretary of the South American Missionary Society. Born in Somerset on 16 April 1929 and ordained in 1959 he began his career with the post of Chaplain at the St Andrew's Chapel to the British Embassy. He then went on to found the Sams Mission in Asuncion, whilst supporting the Chaco missions such as Makklaiwaya MissionWorking closely with notable missionaries such as Derek and Betty Hawksbee, Asunción after which he was Archdeacon of northern Argentina and Paraguay by the age of 36 before his ordination to the episcopate as Northern Argentina and Paraguay's first Anglican bishop. Translated to Peru in 1973 he returned to Britain as Vicar of St Cyprian's, Edge Hill He later took the position of leading SAMS through its transitional period as a Mission allied to Allen Gardiner and his vision to a much more diverse and culturally open church. He visited South America again to inter his late wife's ashes and spent time with colleagues and friends from many backgrounds returning to the Uk to promote and support the missions he loved dearly . He died on 1 October 2008, leaving behind six children, many grandchildren and one great grandchild.

Anglican Communion titles
| New title | Bishop of Paraguay; 1969–1973 | Succeeded by Douglas Milmine |
| New title | Bishop of Peru; 1973–1977 | Succeeded by David Evans |
