= Gordon Savage (bishop) =

Gordon David Savage (14 April 1915 – 9 June 1990) was an Anglican bishop who served in two posts from 1960 to 1970.

Born on 14 April 1915 he was educated at Reading School and St Catherine's College, Oxford and ordained in 1940. His first post was as Chaplain, Lecturer and Tutor at Tyndale Hall, Bristol until 1944. In 1945 he was appointed General Secretary of Church Association and was responsible for its merger with the National Church League to form Church Society, which he led until 1952. He then served as Vicar of Marston, Oxford (1952–57); Vicar of Whitchurch and Archdeacon of Buckingham (1957–60); Suffragan Bishop of Buckingham (1960–64) and Diocesan Bishop of Southwell (1964–70).

In 1970, Gordon Savage resigned as Bishop due to ill-health and took up light pastoral duties as chaplain to the Anglican Church in Puerto Cruz, Tenerife. Shortly before this he and his wife had agreed to separate and on arrival in Tenerife, he employed a housekeeper. When it became known that his housekeeper was a friend and a former dancer, whom he had met at the Eve Club in London in 1964, articles in the national press started to appear drawing attention to this. On account of such controversial publicity, Savage flew back to London for talks with the Archbishop of Canterbury, and it was agreed that he would resign from his new post and relinquish all further pastoral duties.

Gordon Savage was ‘a fluent and intelligent speaker, young in outlook and interested in inter-Church relations’. He represented ‘modern Church thinking’, and was known as the ‘Young People’s Bishop’. In 1968, he was considered as a possible successor to Dr. Ramsey, Archbishop of Canterbury.

He died 9 June 1990 (aged 75 years).

Church of England titles
Preceded by Robert Milton Hay	Bishop of Buckingham; 1960 – 1964	Succeeded by George Christopher Cutts Pepys
Preceded by Frank Russell Barry	Bishop of Southwell; 1964–1970	Succeeded by John Denis Wakeling
