= Nelson Ojeda =

Chilean Anglican bishop:

Nelson Ojeda is a Chilean Anglican bishop. He was consecrated as an auxiliary Bishop of Chile in 2016, and continued in that role after the diocese was formed into an autonomous ecclesiastical province in 2018.
