= Maurice Sinclair =

Maurice Walter Sinclair (born 20 January 1937) is a retired English Anglican bishop. He was the Bishop of Northern Argentina from 1990 to 2001, and Primate of the Southern Cone, from 1996 to 2001.

He was educated at Chigwell School and the University of Nottingham, in England. He was ordained an Anglican priest in 1964 and began his career with a curacy at St John's Church, Boscombe. In 1967 he went to South America where he served as a Missionary. He returned to England in 1984 to become Principal of Crowther Hall, Selly Oak, a post he held to his elevation to the episcopate. He was Bishop of Northern Argentina, from 1990 to 2001, and Primate of the Southern Cone of America, from 1996 to 2001. He returned to England, where in his retirement he continues to serve as an assistant bishop in the Diocese of Birmingham.

Church of England titles
Preceded by David Leake	Bishop of Northern Argentina; 1990–2001	Interregnum
