= Gregory Venables =

English Anglican bishop (born 1949)

The Most Reverend Gregory Venables
- Presiding Bishop of the Anglican Church of South America; Bishop of Argentina
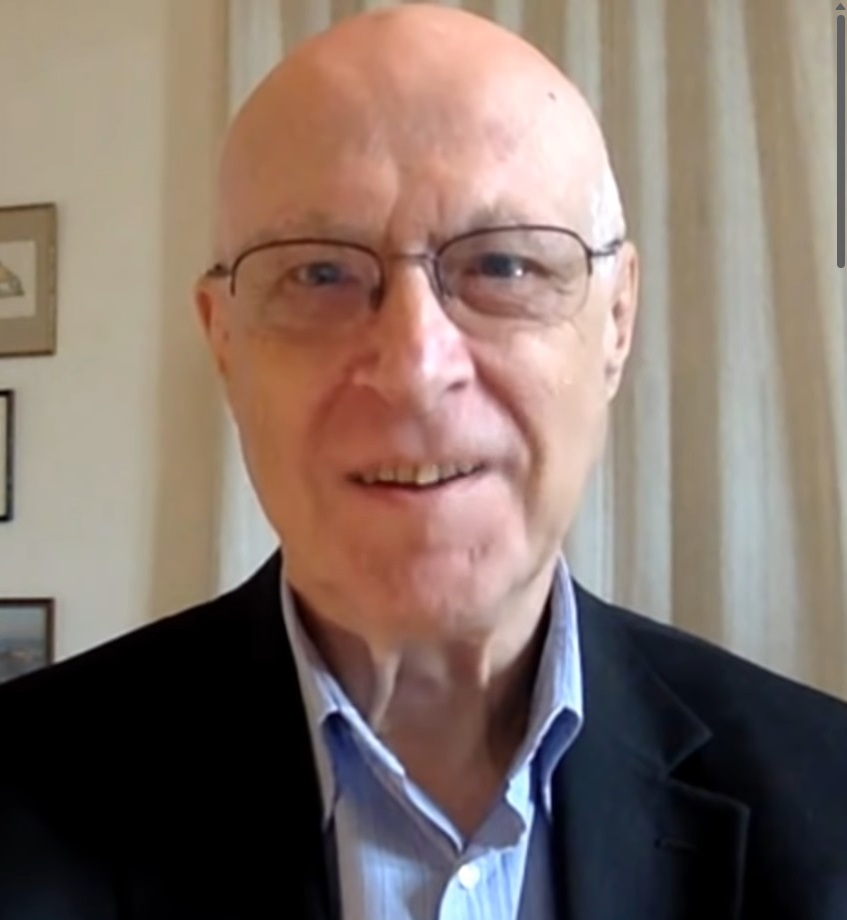
- Venables interviewed on Anglican Unscripted in 2018
- Church: Anglican Church of South America
- Diocese: Argentina
- In office: 2002–2020
- Predecessor: David Leake
- Successor: Brian Williams
- Other posts: Presiding bishop of the Anglican Church of South America (2001–2010, 2016–2020); Bishop of Bolivia (1995–2001)

Orders
- Ordination: 1985
- Consecration: 1993

Personal details
- Born: 6 December 1949 (age 76)

Gregory James Venables (born 6 December 1949) is an English Anglican bishop. He served as the Primate of the Southern Cone in South America (now called the Anglican Church of South America) from 2001 until 2010, and again from 2016 until 2020. He was also Bishop of Argentina from 2002 to 2020.

== Early life ==
Venables was educated at Chatham House Grammar School, Kingston University and Christ Church University College Canterbury, after which he was successively a computer systems officer and a school teacher.

== Ecclesiastical career ==
Venables was ordained as a deacon in 1984 and eight months later as priest. He started his ordained ministry, serving with the Anglican Church in Paraguay, Bolivia and Argentina. He was headmaster of St Andrew's College, Asunción, Paraguay, from 1978 until 1989.

He was ordained to the episcopate in 1993 and returned to South America as Assistant Bishop of Peru and Bolivia, being consecrated the first Bishop of Bolivia in 1995.

Venables was elected Archbishop of South America for the first time in 2001, serving until 2010. He became a significant leader of the Anglican realignment during his tenure. He was once again elected at the provincial synod held in Santiago, Chile on 7–10 November 2016

Venables is an honorary Fellow of Canterbury Christ Church University. He is also the Patron of the Federation of Anglican Churches in the Americas.

Venables has been married to Sylvia Margaret (née Norton) since 1970 and they have one son, two daughters and nine grandchildren.

Anglican Communion titles
Preceded by Maurice Sinclair	Presiding Bishop of the Anglican Church of the Southern Cone of America; 2001–2010	Succeeded by Tito Zavala
Preceded by Tito Zavala	Presiding Bishop of the Anglican Church of South America; 2016–2020	Succeeded by Nick Drayson
Preceded by David Leake	Bishop of Argentina; 2002–2020	Succeeded by Brian Williams
Preceded by New position	Bishop of Bolivia; 1995–2001	Succeeded by Frank Lyons
