= Anglican Church of South America =

South American religious congregation

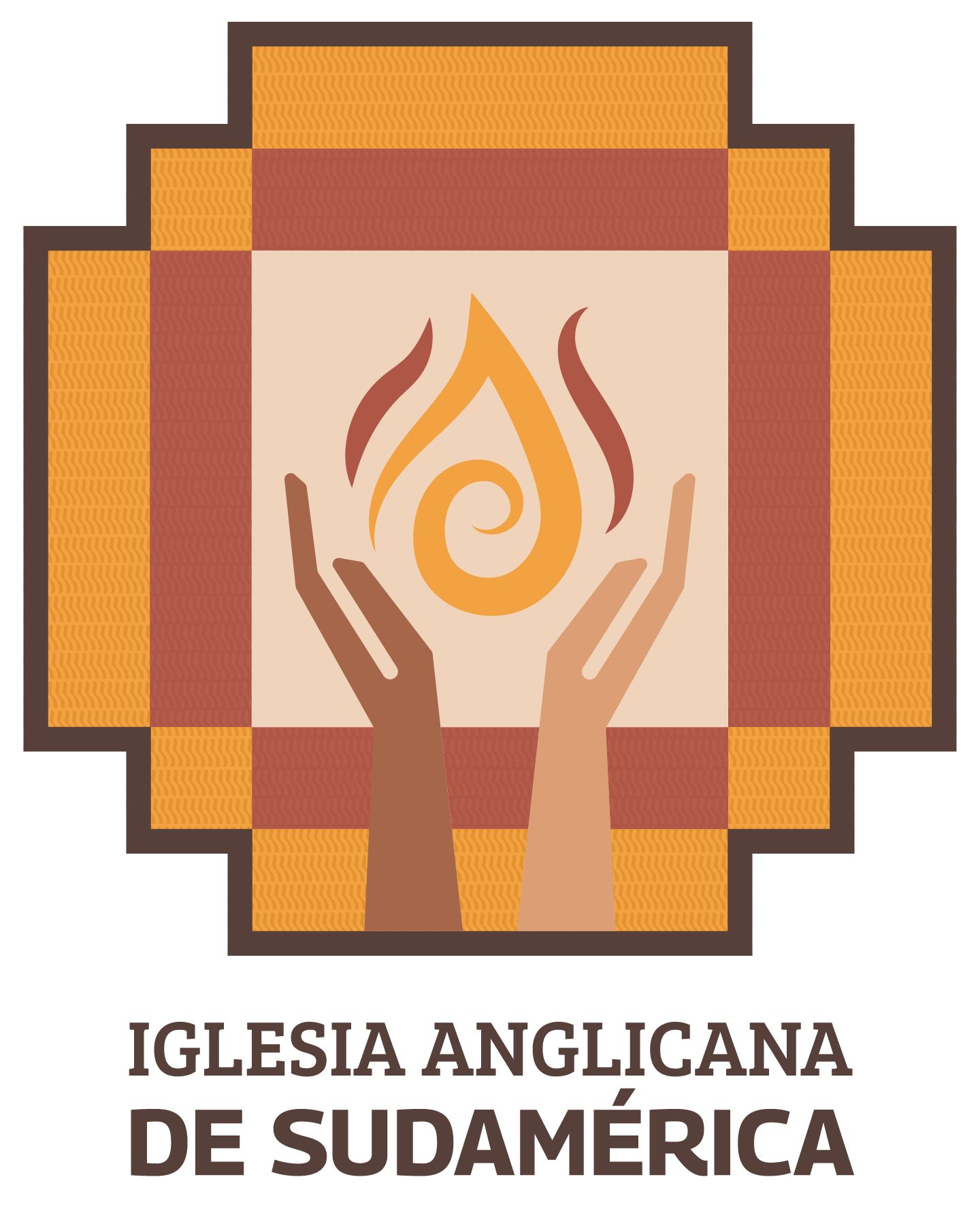
- Classification: Protestant
- Orientation: Anglican
- Scripture: Holy Bible
- Theology: Anglican doctrine
- Polity: Episcopal
- Presiding bishop: Brian Williams
- Associations: Anglican Communion, GAFCON, Global South
- Territory: Argentina, Bolivia, Paraguay, Peru, and Uruguay
- Congregations: 300
- Members: 41,600 (2010; 2017)

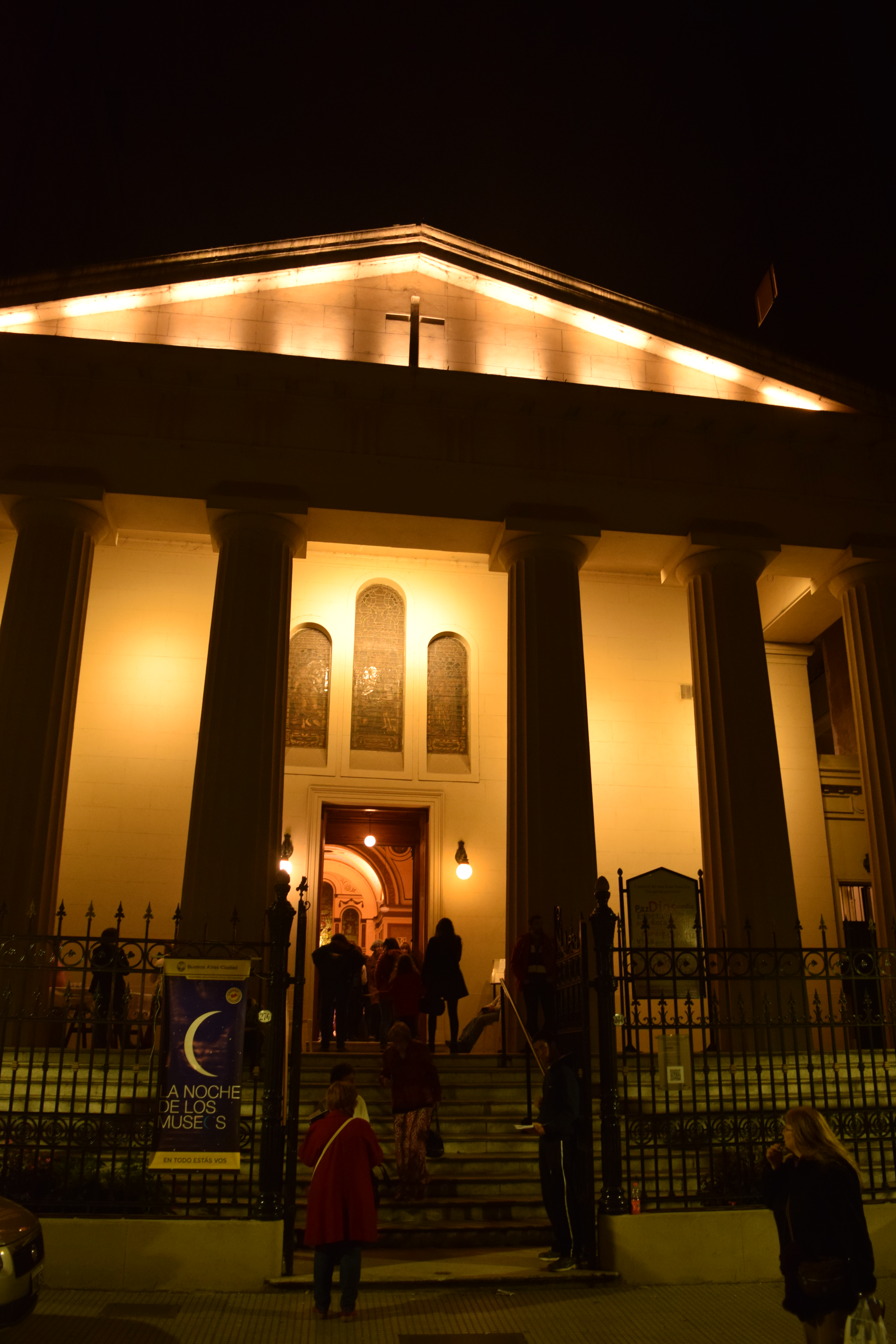
Anglican Cathedral of St. John the Baptist, in Buenos Aires

The Anglican Church of South America (Spanish: Iglesia Anglicana de Sudamérica) is the ecclesiastical province of the Anglican Communion that covers six dioceses in the countries of Argentina, Bolivia, Paraguay, Peru, and Uruguay.

Formed in 1981, the province has 35,000 members. The majority of its members (30,000) live in Argentina with a population in the rest of South America spread thinly. It is one of the smaller provinces in the Anglican Communion in terms of members, although one of the largest in geographical extent. In 2017, Growth and Decline in the Anglican Communion: 1980 to the Present, published by Routledge, collected research reporting there were 41,600 Anglicans in the Anglican Church of South America.

The province was known as "The Province of the Southern Cone of America" from its formation in 1981 until September 2014, when it formally changed its name to "The Anglican Church of South America".

The province also included Chile until the inception of the new Anglican Church of Chile as an autonomous province of the Anglican Communion on 4 November 2018.

== History ==
During the 19th century, British immigrants to South America brought Anglicanism with them. In Britain, a voluntary Anglican society was formed in 1844 to evangelize the indigenous peoples of Tierra del Fuego. This later became the South American Mission Society (SAMS) and extended its activities to the Araucanian regions of Chile and the Chaco. It still has an important place in the life of the church. (Note: But, since 2010, SAMS has been part of the new Church Mission Society.)

The first diocese was established in 1869 as the Diocese of the Falkland Islands and the rest of South America, excepting British Guiana. The see of the bishop was in Buenos Aires. (Note: This was due to legal requirements at the time, which did not allow the Church of England to consecrate or appoint bishops outside those territories under the jurisdiction of the Crown.) Despite its title, the diocese's effective territory was restricted to the Southern Cone plus Peru and Bolivia. By contrast, Anglican/Episcopal congregations in Brazil and the more northern Spanish-speaking countries were effectively under the wing of the Episcopal Church of the USA. As the Anglican Church and its mission grew in South America, new dioceses were created from that larger one. Missionary bishops were appointed to smaller dioceses.

Until 1974, these missionary dioceses were under the metropolitical oversight of the Archbishop of Canterbury. For the next seven years, they were administered by an ad hoc council known by the acronym CASA (Consejo Anglicano de Sud América), which also had Brazilian members.

In 1981, the five dioceses of Argentina (at the time including Uruguay, which became an independent diocese only in 1988,) Northern Argentina, Peru and Bolivia (separated into two dioceses subsequent to 1988), Chile, and Paraguay came together to form the Province of the Southern Cone.

Bishop David Leake was the first South American-born primate of the Anglican Church of the Southern Cone, while being Bishop of Argentina. In November 2010, at a provincial synod held in Argentina, Bishop Tito Zavala, Diocesan Bishop of Chile, was elected primate. He was the second South American-born primate of the province, and served for six years.

In November 2016, at the provincial synod in Santiago, Chile, Bishop Gregory Venables, was re-elected primate of the Province of South America. He had previously served from 2001 to 2010.

In early 2018 the Diocese of Chile split into four dioceses, and in November that year those dioceses were removed from the Anglican Church of South America and formed into an autonomous province named the Anglican Church of Chile, with Tito Zavala as its first primate.

== Doctrine ==
The province is distinguished by a conservative interpretation of Biblical texts and church practice while some dioceses are more liberal.

=== Ordination of women ===
The province has been outspoken in its opposition to the ordination of women to the priesthood, generally appealing to scriptural issues of headship as the basis for such opposition. The Diocese of Uruguay, which has historically been more liberal than other parts of the province, made a formal request in 2011 to be allowed to admit women to the priesthood. This request was received by the provincial synod meeting held in Asunción, Paraguay, in November 2011, and was rejected. However, in 2015 Bolivia became the first diocese in the province to ordain women as priests, ordaining the Rev. Tammy Smith-Firestone. Later that year Rev. Susana Lopez Lerena, the Rev. Cynthia Myers Dickin and the Rev. Audrey Taylor Gonzalez became the first women Anglican priests ordained in the Diocese of Uruguay.

=== Human sexuality ===
The Anglican Church of South America is a part of GAFCON, a conservative coalition of Anglican provinces opposing non-celibate homosexuality and same-sex marriage.

== Dioceses ==
=== Diócesis de Argentina (Diocese of Argentina) ===
- Diocesan bishop — Brian Williams, 2020–
- Previous bishops: Edward Francis Every, 1910–1937; John Weller, 1937–1946; D. Ivor Evans, 1946–1962; Cyril Tucker, 1963–1975; Richard Cutts, 1975–1988; David Leake, 1989–2001; Gregory Venables, 2002–2020;

=== Diócesis de Argentina Norte (Diocese of Northern Argentina) ===
Founded 1969.

- Diocesan bishop — Vacant, 2023–
- Suffragan bishops — Mateo Alto, Cristiano Rojas
- Previous bishops: Bill Flagg, 1969–1973; Patrick Harris, 1973–1979; David Leake, 1979–1989; Maurice Sinclair, 1990–2001; Nick Drayson, 2011–2023

=== Diócesis de Bolivia (Diocese of Bolivia) ===
Inaugurated as a diocese in 1995. Missionaries began their work in the early 1980s.

- Diocesan bishop — Walter Toro, 2022–
- Previous bishops: Gregory James Venables, 1995–2001, Frank Lyons, 2001–2012; Raphael R. Samuel, 2013–2022

=== Diócesis de Paraguay (Diocese of Paraguay) ===
Founded 1973.

- Diocesan bishop — vacant position
- Previous bishops: Douglas Milmine, 1973–1985; John Ellison, 1988–2007; Peter Bartlett, 2008–

=== Diócesis de Perú (Diocese of Peru) ===
Founded 1977.

- Diocesan bishop — Jorge Luis Aguilar, 2017–
- Previous bishops: Bill Flagg, 1977; David Evans, 1978–1988; Alan Winstanley, 1988–1993; William Godfrey, 1998–2017

=== Diócesis de Uruguay (Diocese of Uruguay) ===
Founded 1988 from Argentina. See city, Cathedral of The Most Holy Trinity, Montevideo

- Vacant
- Previous bishops: William Godfrey, 1988–1998; Miguel Tamayo; Michele Pollesel, 2013–2017; Daniel Genovesi, 2019–2024)

== Separation of Peru ==
In July 2015 it was announced by the Anglican Communion secretariat that the Diocese of Peru was working towards emancipation from the Province of South America, with the intention of becoming an autonomous province of the Anglican Communion, consisting of four dioceses. The four dioceses were to be formed by splitting the current Diocese of Peru into the new dioceses of Lima, Arequipa, Chiclayo, and Huancayo. No date was announced for the formation of the province, but the intended first bishops of each diocese were consecrated. Bishops Alejandro Mesco, Juan Carlos Revilla, and Jorge Luis Aguilar, were all consecrated in July 2015; they are the first indigenous Peruvian bishops to be consecrated in the Anglican Communion. The decision to become an independent province was rescinded at the diocesan synod in 2017. The new bishops remain in post as auxiliary bishops within the diocese.

== Separation of Chile ==
In July 2015 it was announced by the Anglican Communion secretariat that the Diocese of Chile was working towards emancipation from the Province of South America, with the intention of becoming an autonomous province of the Anglican Communion, consisting of four dioceses. The four dioceses were to be formed by splitting the current Diocese of Chile into the new dioceses of Concepción, Santiago, Temuco, and Valparaíso. The intended first bishops of the four dioceses were Tito Zavala (then the diocesan bishop), Abelino Manuel Apeleo (then the auxiliary bishop), and two new bishops who were consecrated in 2016 as additional auxiliaries, namely Alfred Cooper and Nelson Ojeda. The split into the four new dioceses took place in the early part of 2018, and the new province was formally constituted on 4 November 2018 by Archbishop Justin Welby and Presiding Bishop Gregory Venables. Tito Zavala and Abelino Manuel Apeleo became diocesan bishops as planned, along with former archdeacons Samuel Morrison and Him Enrique Lago. The two bishops consecrated in 2016 remain in post as auxiliary bishops within the diocese.

== Anglican realignment ==
In 2003, after the consecration of Gene Robinson, a gay man, as the Bishop of New Hampshire in the Episcopal Church in the United States of America, the Province of the Southern Cone severed its relationship with the Episcopal Church (the sole dissent in the diocesan synod was the vote of the Diocese of Uruguay, which voted to maintain full communion with both the Anglican Church of Canada and the Episcopal Church). The province has been involved in the Anglican realignment, as a member of the Global South (Anglican), (GAFCON), and it is in full communion with the Anglican Church in North America, formed in 2009 by former members of the Episcopal Church. The Church of the Province of the Southern Cone decided previously to extend ecclesiastical jurisdiction to conservative congregations or dioceses (including some from the Diocese of Virginia) that departed from the Episcopal Church, but were located within its geographical authority.

The bishops and a number of communicants of four dioceses in the United States — the Anglican Diocese of San Joaquin, the Anglican Diocese of Pittsburgh, the Episcopal Diocese of Fort Worth and the Diocese of Quincy (ACNA) – voted in their conventions to separate from the Episcopal Church and affiliate "on an emergency and temporary basis" with the Anglican Church of the Southern Cone of America. Those who have chosen to remain in the Episcopal Church in the United States have reformed their dioceses and have elected new leadership.

In Canada, 72 parishes in Canada have formed the Anglican Network in Canada and identify as an "ecclesial body under the jurisdiction of the Anglican Province of the Southern Cone".

The province also had provisional oversight over one diocese in Brazil, the Diocese of Recife (Diocese do Recife) under Bishop Robinson Cavalcanti, which withdrew from the Anglican Episcopal Church of Brazil, due to the diocese's opposition to the Brazilian policy of blessing same-sex unions, but later become an extraprovincial diocese of the Global South.

The Anglican Communion Office does not recognize jurisdiction of the Southern Cone bishops over dioceses and ecclesiastical bodies located geographically outside Argentina, Bolivia, Chile, Paraguay, Peru, and Uruguay.

== Notes and references ==
Notes

== Bibliography ==
Milmine, Obispo Douglas (1993), La Comunion Anglicana en América Latina
