= James Drummond Anderson =

James Drummond Anderson may refer to:

- James Drummond Anderson (1852–1920), member of the Indian Civil Service
- James Drummond Anderson (1886–1968), his son, financial governor of the Punjab

== See also ==
- James Anderson (disambiguation)
