= Cuthbert Bardsley =

British Anglican bishop (1907–1991)

The Right Reverend Cuthbert Bardsley CBE ChStJ
- Bishop of Coventry
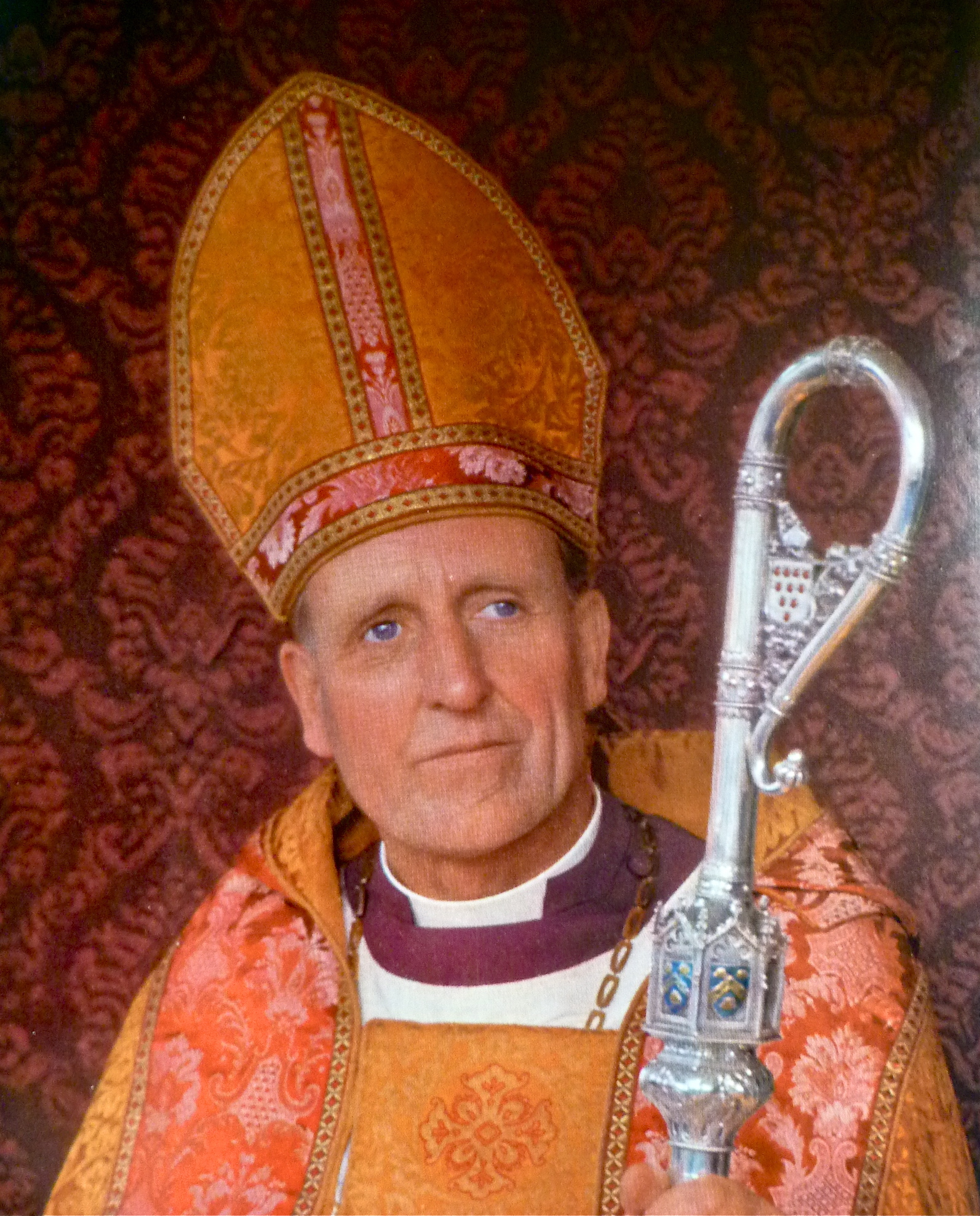
- Bishop Bardsley in 1962
- Church: Church of England
- Province: Canterbury
- Diocese: Diocese of Coventry
- Elected: 5 May 1956
- Term ended: 5 May 1976 (retired)
- Predecessor: Neville Gorton
- Successor: John Gibbs
- Other posts: Bishop of Croydon; 1947–1956

Orders
- Ordination: September 1932

Personal details
- Born: 28 March 1907 Ulverston, Lancashire, England
- Died: 19 January 1991 (aged 83) Cirencester, Gloucestershire, England
- Denomination: Anglican
- Parents: Norman Bardsley and Annie Mabel Killick
- Spouse: Ellen Mitchell
- Education: Eton College; New College, Oxford

Cuthbert Killick Norman Bardsley CBE ChStJ (28 March 1907 – 9 January 1991) was an Anglican bishop and evangelist who served as Bishop of Croydon from 1947 to 1956 and Bishop of Coventry from 1956 to 1976. It was during his tenure at Coventry that the new cathedral was consecrated in 1962, following the destruction of its 14th-century predecessor during the Second World War.

== Formative years ==
Cuthbert Bardsley was born at Ulverston in Lancashire on the 28 March 1907, the youngest of six children of a Church of England vicar, Norman Bardsley, and his wife Annie Killick. In 1909 his father became vicar of Lancaster where Bardsley spent his childhood. He came from a family steeped in the tradition of Anglicanism who, within three generations, produced 29 priests and three bishops. In addition to Bardsley, consecrated in 1947, his lineage included John Wareing Bardsley, Bishop of Carlisle (1892–95) and his uncle Cyril Bardsley, Bishop of Peterborough (1924–27).

Cuthbert was educated at Summer Fields School, Oxford and entered Eton College in 1919. At 6' 6" in height when fully grown he was a natural sportsman and Bardsley excelled at sport and showed aptitude for art. A regular attender at Eton college chapel Bardsley left Eton in 1926 ... still a nominal adherent of the Lord but far from a committed follower... At New College, Oxford, Bardsley read Modern Greats enlisting wholeheartedly in the activities of the Oxford Group, an evangelical grouping founded by Frank Buchman that called for a moral crusade into society. Ultimately Bardsley distanced himself from Buchman but throughout his years as a pastor he retained an evangelical zeal to take the Christian message into all parts of society. Oxford cemented Bardsley's belief in ...Christianity with a purpose... and by 1930 he was on a path to ordination.

== Ministry ==
As an Anglican ordinand Bardsley attended Westcott House, Cambridge, in 1930, where the principal was Bertram Cunningham, who has been described by Archbishop Donald Coggan as "a man who probably influenced the Church of England more than other teacher this (20th) century". He was not, however, an enthusiast of the Oxford Group believing that the zealousness of some of the adherents could lead to a situation of Schism. There were tensions at Westcott during these years but Cunningham's teaching methods overcame potential rifts. Bardsley's time at Westcott House proved a happy period in his life. He was part of an influential in-take and contemporaries include: Launcelot Fleming, later Bishop of Norwich, Forbes Horan later Bishop of Tewkesbury and Geoffrey Tiarks, Bishop of Maidstone.

Whilst at Westcott House, Bardsley met Philip Clayton, known as 'Tubby', a renowned churchman and preacher who during the Great War had founded a retreat for soldiers at Poperinghe, Belgium that became famous as a sanctuary. Clayton used the symbol of a lamp to found the TocH, to promote reconciliation and work to bring disparate sections of society together particularly within cities. Clayton's living of All Hallows-by-the-Tower was in the City of London and it was to the East End of London in 1932 initially as a deacon and then upon ordination in 1933 as a curate that Bardsley first served his ministry. A conviction that he should remain mindful of the activities of the Oxford Group remained and in 1935 he sought the permission of the Bishop of London, Arthur Winnington-Ingram to work full-time as one of their totems. His subsequent mission took him to Norway, Denmark and Switzerland as well as extensive work at home. During the mid-30s the Oxford Group witnessed large attendances and conversions to evangelical Anglicanism. Initially Beardsley remained zealous in his support but as the 1930s progressed he began to harbour doubts about his involvement in the Oxford Group particularly after it became the Moral Re-Armament movement in 1938. Bardsley concluded that the movement had strayed from its founding principles of Jesus as Saviour into a more general purpose on morality and shortly after ended his formal association.

Bardsley returned to London in 1940 as vicar of St. Mary Magdalene Woolwich, where he was joined by his sister Dorothy who was to become his helper and companion for the next thirty two years. As the bombing of London continued during 1940 - 41 Bardsley worked tirelessly, sometimes to the point of exhaustion, in providing practical and spiritual aid to his parishioners. Although the Woolwich church stayed open during the Blitz (indeed the crypt was a sanctuary) Bardsley organised Industrial Missions to take the Gospel to the factories and offices. These missions were a guiding principle of Bardsley's wherever he served. He did not believe in sitting in a church and waiting for people to come to him.

Bardsley spent four years at Woolwich, later moving to the position of Provost of Southwark Cathedral on London's South Bank in 1944. Although the Blitz had ended rockets in the shape of flying bombs added a further test of morale to Londoners (and further afield). Bardsley's bishop, Bertram Simpson was an admirer of the notion of 'Industrial Mission' and saw Bardsley as the ideal man to lead an evangelical mission into the docks, wharfs, markets, factories and offices of the South Bank. As the war concluded Bardsley was vocal in stating that now the war was over the Church needed to win the peace As a consequence the Archbishop of Canterbury Geoffrey Fisher invited Bardsley's to undertake a pastoral visit to troops under the British Army of The Rhine where he visited thirty-three regiments, made numerous broadcasts, took part in several reconciliation events and partook in many services. In November 1947 his mission changed again with his appointment as Suffragan Bishop of Croydon.

== Ministry as Bishop ==
Although based at Croydon as one of Archbishop Fisher's suffragans, Bardsley was instructed to continue his mission to the Combined Forces. He remained as Bishop of Croydon for nearly nine years combining pastoral duties in Croydon with frequent visits overseas in support of his priests working with the Forces. Croydon had been badly bombed during the war and Bardsley involved himself in the reconstruction that was needed. The importance of taking the mission to industry remained a central tenet and he founded the Croydon Industrial Chaplaincy in 1950 to promote Christianity’s relationship with local industry. Bardsley realised that the Church needed to provide practical leadership if it was to remain relevant to many peoples' lives that had been disrupted by the War and the long period of austerity that followed.

The huge workload that Bardsley undertook started to effect his health and after a visit to Kenya in 1952 he suffered a minor thrombosis necessitating a period in hospital and convalescence. Bardsley was not a man to rest for long and returned to work too early subsequently developing further thromboses and a duodenal ulcer, the intense pain of which reoccurred for the rest of his life. Bardsley was appointed a CBE in the Birthday honours List in 1952. In 1957 he received an honorary Doctor of Divinity from Oxford University.

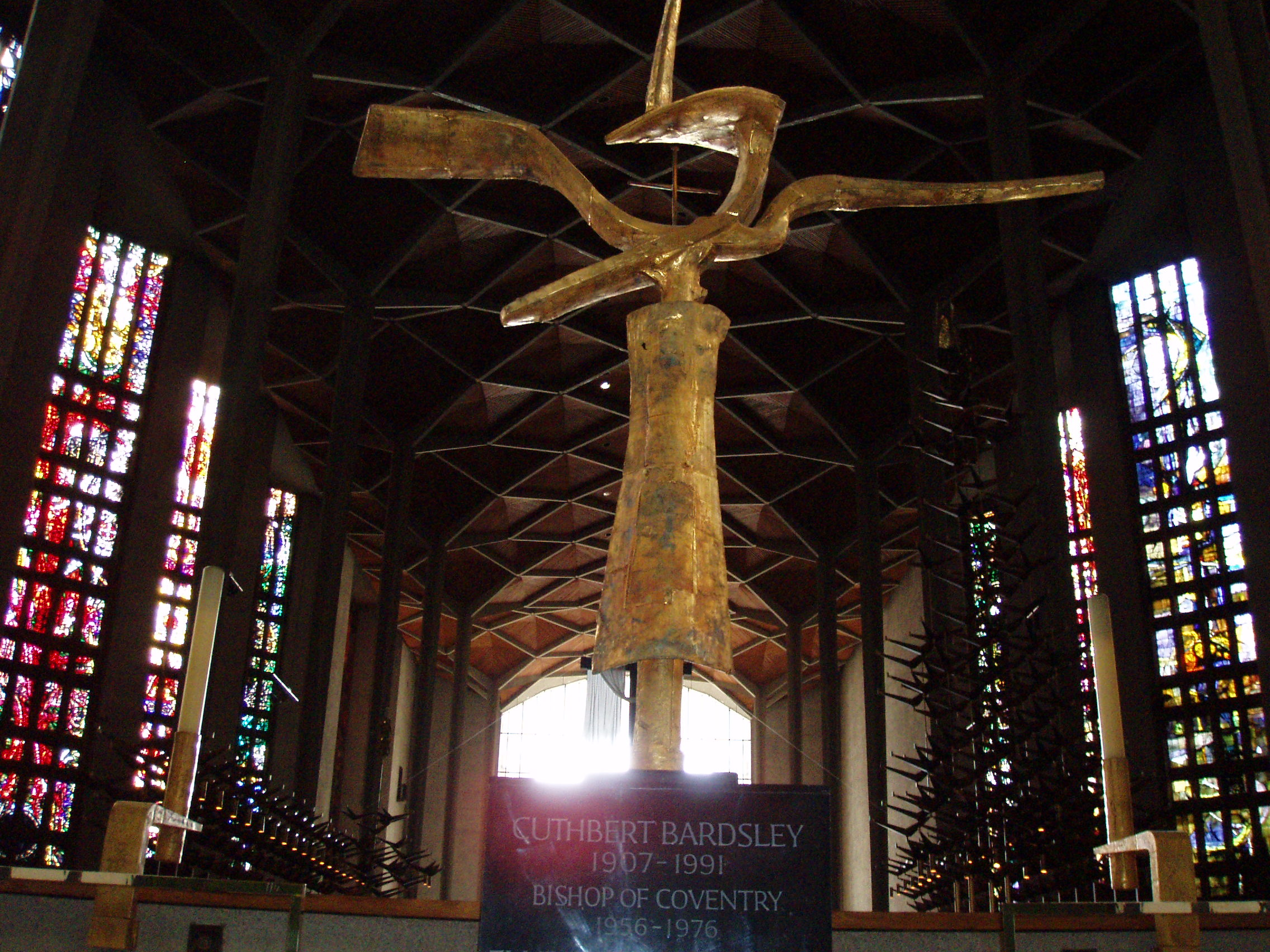
Bishop Cuthbert Bardsley Memorial in Coventry Cathedral

Following the death in office of Bishop Neville Gorton in 1956, Cuthbert Bardsley was appointed to the See of Coventry. The Fourteenth Century The Cathedral Church of St. Michael had been destroyed overnight on 14 November 1940 during the Coventry Blitz by the Luftwaffe. In the following years a new cathedral, designed by architect Basil Spence and next to the ruins of the old cathedral was built and consecrated in 1962. Bardsley oversaw its renewal as a centre of Christian teaching. As in previous postings Bardsley sought at every opportunity to take the Gospel into Coventry's factories and offices, acquiring the affectionate sobriquet of The Works Padre. As bishop he built up a network of representatives from all walks of life that included: politicians, trade union leaders, faith groups and educationalists. Regular conferences to which community leaders were invited were arranged as Bardsley continued to seek a central place for The Church in peoples' lives. Although Bardsley operated best in a city environment his diocese also included many rural parishes which were reorganised and revitalised through regular meetings with their Bishop. The city recognised his service to them and bestowed honours upon him that included president of Coventry City Football Club and in 1976 an honorary DLitt of Warwick University. As a leading Anglican evangelist, it was Bardsley's deep concern that evangelism should be at the centre of the Church's thinking and strategy. This was not a universally held position and Bardsley fretted that the evangelical zeal he felt was not high enough on the Church's agenda. In 1967 he persuaded Archbishop Michael Ramsey to set up the Archbishop's Council on Evangelism. Bardsley was chairman with a purpose to measure, evaluate and propagate news of evangelist enterprises. These included Lee Abbey an evangelical retreat in Devon where Bardsley was chairman of their Council. He remained a committed evangelist for the remainder of his ministry. In 1963 he took his seat as a Lords Spiritual in the House of Lords where he offered practical help and solutions on issues that included Third World poverty and famine relief.

In 1972 Bardsley married Ellen Mitchell and in May 1976 he resigned the see at Coventry. In his retirement at Cirencester he remained committed to evangelical causes, particularly Lee Abbey, which he visited regularly in his remaining years. Bardsley was also an enthusiastic amateur oil painter, and several of his works have appeared at auction room sales in recent years. Cuthbert Bardsley died on 8 January 1991.

The high altar cross by Geoffrey Clarke created in 1962 for the consecration of the new Coventry cathedral was dedicated as a memorial to Bardsley after his death. It is made from silver and plated with gold, and is an abstract work representing a phoenix rising from the ashes. Three medieval nails which were part of the old cathedral's roof are incorporated within the structure. This cross of nails was inspired by the example of the ministry for reconciliation and forgiveness led by Bishop

== Biography ==
- Donald Coggan, Cuthbert Bardsley: Bishop, Evangelist, Pastor, Collins, London, 1989. ISBN 0 00 215094-8

== Bibliography ==
- 1952: Bishop's Move, Cuthbert Bardsley, Bishop of Croydon, published by A R Mowbray
- 1953: An address given by C.K.N. Bardsley, Bishop suffragan of Croydon, AGM of the Church of England Soldiers', Sailors'and Airmen's Institutes at Church House, Westminster SW1 on 8 July 1953.
- 1962: Sundry Times, Sundry Places, Bardsley, published by A R Mowbray
- 1967: Him We Declare, Cuthbert Bardsley and William Purcell published by Mowbray
- 1970: I Believe in Mission, Bardsley published by Mowbray

Church of England titles
Preceded by Frederick Dudley Vaughan Narborough	Provost of Southwark; 1944 – 1947	Succeeded by Hugh Edward Ashdown
Preceded by Maurice Harland	Bishop of Croydon; 1947 – 1956	Succeeded by John Taylor Hughes
Preceded by Inaugural appointment	Bishop to the Forces; 1948–1956	Succeeded by Stanley Woodley Betts
Preceded by Neville Vincent Gorton	Bishop of Coventry; 1956 – 1976	Succeeded by John Gibbs
