= Stanley Betts =

Anglican bishop

Stanley Woodley Betts CBE (23 March 1912 – 7 June 2003) was an Anglican bishop in the 20th century.

== Life ==
Betts was educated at Perse School and Jesus College, Cambridge. He was ordained in 1936 and was successively a wartime chaplain with the RAF, a chaplain at Clare College, Cambridge, the Vicar of Holy Trinity, Cambridge and then, in 1956, the Bishop of Maidstone with the additional title of Archbishop of Canterbury's Episcopal Representative with the three Armed Forces. (Before his appointment, the last Bishop of Maidstone had been Leslie Owen, who was translated to Lincoln in 1946.) From 1966 he was Dean of Rochester, a post he held for 11 years.

Church of England titles
Vacant Title last held by Leslie Owen	Bishop of Maidstone; 1956–1966	Vacant Title next held by Geoffrey Lewis Tiarks
Preceded by Cuthbert Bardsley	Bishop to the Forces; 1956–1966	Succeeded by John Taylor Hughes
Preceded by Robert William Stannard	Dean of Rochester; 1966–1977	Succeeded by John Robert Arnold
