= Frank Sargeant (bishop) =

The Rt Revd Frank Sargeant BA(Hons) DipTh
- Bishop at Lambeth
- Church: Church of England
- In office: 1994–1999
- Predecessor: John Yates
- Successor: Richard Llewellin
- Other posts: Honorary assistant bishop in Manchester (1999–present) and in Liverpool (2007–present); in Europe (1999–2008); and in Canterbury (1995–1999); Bishop of Stockport (1984–1994); Archdeacon of Bradford (1977–1984)

Orders
- Ordination: c. 1958 (deacon); c. 1959 (priest)
- Consecration: 1984

Personal details
- Born: 12 September 1932 (age 94)
- Denomination: Anglican
- Parents: John Stanley & Grace
- Spouse: Sally McDermott (m. 1958)
- Children: 3 sons; 2 daughters
- Education: St John's College, Durham

Frank Pilkington Sargeant (born 12 September 1932) is a retired Anglican bishop.

Educated at Boston Grammar School, the University of Durham and Cranmer Hall, he was ordained in 1961 and began his ministry with a curacy at Gainsborough. Following this he was priest in charge of St Martin's Grimsby, Vicar of North Hykeham, a residentiary canon of Bradford Cathedral, then Archdeacon of Bradford before ordination to the episcopate as Bishop of Stockport. His last post was as Bishop at Lambeth, a non-diocesan appointment to be head of the Archbishop of Canterbury’s staff. In retirement he is an honorary assistant bishop (primarily) in the Diocese of Manchester.

Church of England titles
Preceded by William Johnston	Archdeacon of Bradford; 1977–1984	Succeeded by David Shreeve
Preceded by Gordon Strutt	Bishop of Stockport; 1984–1994	Succeeded by Geoffrey Turner
Preceded by John Yates	Bishop at Lambeth; 1994–1999	Succeeded by Richard Llewellin
