= Ronald Gordon (bishop) =

British Anglican bishop (1927–2015)

The Rt Revd Ronald Gordon
- Bishop at Lambeth
- Church: Church of England
- In office: 1984–1991
- Successor: John Yates
- Other posts: Sub-Dean at Christ Church, Oxford (1991–1996); Honorary assistant bishop in Oxford (1996–2015); Bishop to the Forces (1985–1990); Honorary assistant bishop in Southwark (1984–1991); Bishop of Portsmouth (1975–1984)

Orders
- Ordination: 1952 (deacon); 1953 (priest)
- Consecration: 23 September 1975

Personal details
- Born: 19 March 1927
- Died: 8 August 2015 (aged 88)
- Denomination: Anglican
- Parents: Sir Archibald and Lady Dorothy Gordon
- Education: Balliol College, Oxford

Archibald Ronald McDonald Gordon (19 March 1927 – 8 August 2015) was a British Anglican bishop. He was the Bishop of Portsmouth from 1975 to 1984. He was the Bishop at Lambeth from 1984 and, additionally, the Bishop to the Forces from 1985. He ended his career as sub-dean at Christ Church, Oxford, from 1991 to 1996.

== Early years ==
Gordon was the son of the diplomat Sir Archibald Gordon CMG and his wife Dorothy, the daughter of Charles Silvester Horne, MP: his great-grandfather, Herbert Cozens-Hardy, 1st Baron Cozens-Hardy, was Master of the Rolls from 1907 until 1918. He was educated at Rugby School and Balliol College, Oxford (organ scholar) BA 1950, MA 1952 before studying for ordination at Cuddesdon College.

== Ordained ministry ==
After a curacy in the East End of London, Gordon returned to Ripon College Cuddesdon as chaplain in 1955. After four years he moved to Birmingham, firstly as a parish priest and then as a canon residentiary at the cathedral. After 12 years in Birmingham he returned to Oxford as vicar of the University Church of St Mary the Virgin.

Gordon was consecrated as a bishop on 23 September 1975 by Donald Coggan, Archbishop of Canterbury, at Westminster Abbey. In 1975 he was appointed to be Bishop of Portsmouth, a role he was to hold for nine years with appointment to the House of Lords coming in 1981; he resigned on 31 May 1984. He was head of the Archbishop of Canterbury’s staff as Bishop at Lambeth from 1984 until 1991 and additionally, Bishop to the Forces from 1985 to 1990. From 1991 until 1996 he was Sub-Dean of Christ Church, Oxford.

== Later life ==
After retiring in 1991 he returned to Oxford where he continued to minister and served on a variety of Church of England committees: namely the Advisory Board for Redundant Churches and the Oxford Mission. He was also formerly a member of the Court of Ecclesiastical Causes Reserved.

Gordon died on 8 August 2015.

Church of England titles
Preceded by John Phillips	Bishop of Portsmouth; 1975–1984	Succeeded by Timothy Bavin
New title	Bishop at Lambeth; 1984–1991	Succeeded by John Yates
Preceded by Stuart Snell	Bishop to the Forces; 1985–1990	Succeeded by David Smith
