= Robert Alexander Fleming =

Scottish pathologist and medical author

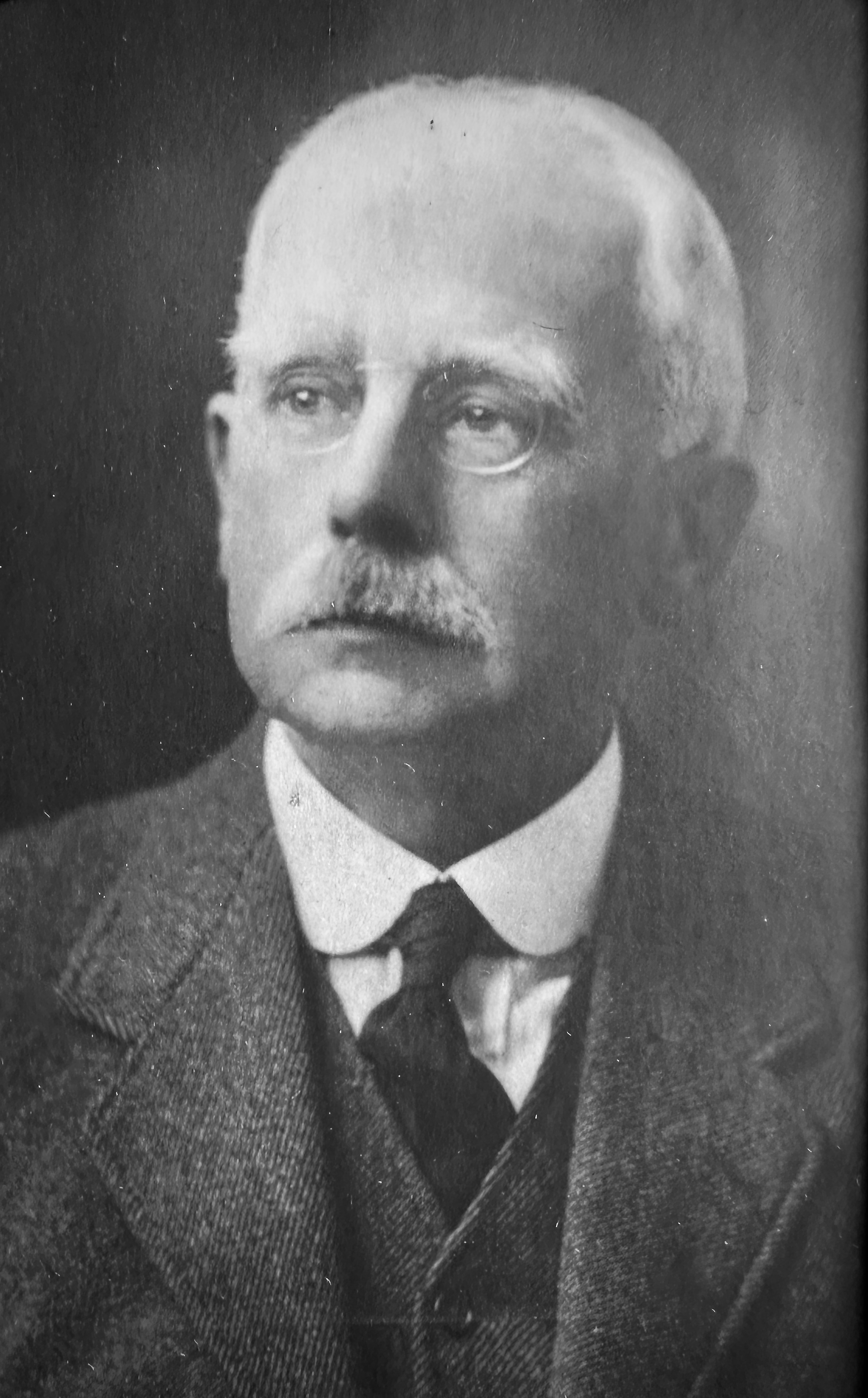
Robert Alexander Fleming

Robert Alexander Fleming FRSE (1862–1947) was a Scottish pathologist and medical author who served as President of the Royal College of Physicians of Edinburgh 1927–29.

== Life ==
He was born in Dundee the son of Emma Lyle and Robert Whillans Fleming, a local merchant. He was educated at Larchfield Academy and Craigmount School. He then went to the University of Edinburgh to study medicine, graduating with an MA in 1884 and MB CB in 1888. He then became senior lecturer in Clinical Medicine at the various Edinburgh medical colleges and university and senior surgeon at the Edinburgh Royal Infirmary.

In 1893 he was elected a member of the Harveian Society of Edinburgh. In 1900 he was living at 10 Chester Street in Edinburgh's West End.

In 1906 he was elected a Fellow of the Royal Society of Edinburgh. His proposers were Alexander Bruce, Daniel John Cunningham, Diarmid Noel Paton and George Alexander Gibson. At this time he was living at 10 Chester Street in Edinburgh's West End.

In the First World War he served in the Royal Army Medical Corps, first at the 2nd Scottish General Hospital then at the 42nd General Hospital as part of the Salonika Expeditionary Force.

In 1925 he was elected a member of the Aesculapian Club.

He died at Innerhadden at Kinloch Rannoch on 6 December 1947.

== Publications ==
- Short Practice of Medicine and Diseases of Spinal Nerves
- Allbut's System of Medicine: The Mental Element of Crime and Criminals

== Family ==
In 1897 he married Eleanor Mary Holland. Their children included Launcelot Fleming FRSE.
