= Maurice Harland =

English Anglican bishop (1896–1986)

The Right Reverend Maurice Harland
- Bishop of Durham
- Diocese: Diocese of Durham
- In office: 1956–1966 (retired)
- Predecessor: Michael Ramsey
- Successor: Ian Ramsey
- Other posts: Bishop suffragan of Croydon (1942–1947); Archdeacon of Croydon (1946–1947); Bishop of Lincoln (11 July 1947 {confirmed}–7 July 1956 {translated})

Orders
- Ordination: 1922 (deacon); 1923 (priest)
- Consecration: 1942

Personal details
- Born: 17 April 1896 Malton, North Riding of Yorkshire
- Died: 29 September 1986 (aged 90) Chichester, West Sussex
- Denomination: Anglican
- Spouse: Agnes Harland MBE (née Winckley)
- Children: 2
- Profession: airman
- Education: St Peter's School, York
- Alma mater: Exeter College, Oxford; Leeds Clergy School

Maurice Henry Harland (17 April 1896 – 29 September 1986) was a 20th-century Anglican bishop, his most significant appointment being Bishop of Durham from 1956 to 1966. He was one of nine Diocesan bishops in England in the 1950s who had served as combatants in the Great War

== Early life ==
Harland was born on 17 April 1896, the son of the Revd William George and Clara Elizabeth Harland and educated at St Peter's School, York. He went straight from school in 1914 as a volunteer to the West Yorkshire Regiment soon after the First World War broke out. He joined the Royal Field Artillery as a lieutenant in France in 1915, and transferred to the Royal Flying Corps in 1917. He was a Flying Officer Observer from June 1917, then a Flying Officer and from April 1918 a Lieutenant. He was on anti-submarine patrol duties in August 1918, and was with No. 212 Squadron RAF when he was demobilised in 1919.

== Marries and begins ministry ==
On demobilisation he went to Exeter College, Oxford, (Note: Made Honorary Fellow in 1950) graduating BA in 1922, MA 1927. (Note: Unlike other universities this is essentially the same degree, a period of time and a small payment securing the higher degree) After a period of study at Leeds Clergy School he became a curate at St Peter's Leicester, during which time he married Agnes Winckley. (Note: She was awarded the MBE in 1967) They had two daughters.

== Career progresses ==
After five years he was appointed successively priest in charge of St Anne's Conventional District, Perpetual Curate (Note: When a new parish was created from a larger rectoral or vicarious parish, the incumbent, or parish priest was styled a “perpetual curate".) of St Matthew's Holbeck, Leeds, Vicar of St Mary's, Windermere and Rural Dean of Ambleside. Harland's reputation in Windermere was considerable and, with the support of the influential Bishop of Carlisle, he was considered for the Diocesan bishopric of Blackburn before his appointment as suffragan Bishop of Croydon In 1946, Archbishop Fisher named him as his second choice for the vacancy at Bristol but George Cockin (Fisher's third choice) was appointed In 1947, Fisher pressed the case for Harland to go to Lincoln whose recent bishops had proved fragile in health. Harland, noted Fisher, was physically strong although not a scholar in the Lincoln tradition. Harland, therefore, was surprised to be offered the post.

'I have seen the Archbishop today and he has been so kind as to make it clear that I must accept your proposal to submit my name to the King for the Bishopric of Lincoln', he wrote to the Prime Minister.

He was even more surprised to be offered Durham in 1956 since traditionally the post had been filled by a scholar who could comfortably blend with the University. The post had been offered to Kenneth Warner DSO, bishop of Edinburgh and, like Harland, a Great War combatant but Warner refused it. Harland wrote again that he had been pressed to accept the post by Archbishop Fisher. Harland made no secret of his limitations in a letter to the diocese.

'The announcement of my prospective translation comes as a quite staggering surprise to my wife and me. It fills me with trepidation.' He noted that Durham had a long history of bishops famous 'for saintliness, scholarship and learning. I am afraid I am quite outside that tradition'

Harland suffered a curious habit of easily forgetting names which did not endear him to his clergy. But he excelled at being a 'layman's bishop'. Administratively and managerially competent, and admired for his pastoral work, he was a contrast to his successor, the dynamic, charismatic academic but rather disorderly Ian Ramsey.

He was alone amongst the episcopate in opposing the abolition of the death penalty for murder in debate in the House of Lords. This was his conclusion having spent many last nights with condemned men while at Lincoln.

== Retirement ==
Harland resigned his see in 1966 and retired to West Wittering, living another 20 years before dying on 29 September 1986.

== Notes ==
Church of England titles
Preceded by William Anderson	Bishop of Croydon; 1942–1947	Succeeded by Cuthbert Bardsley
Preceded by Leslie Owen	Bishop of Lincoln; 1947–1956	Succeeded by Kenneth Riches
Preceded by Michael Ramsey	Bishop of Durham; 1956–1966	Succeeded by Ian Ramsey
