= John Hughes (bishop of Croydon) =

English Anglican bishop (1908–2001)

John Taylor Hughes (12 April 1908 – 21 July 2001) was an Anglican bishop in the 20th century.

Hughes was educated firstly in Uxbridge and subsequently at Bede College, University of Durham. He was ordained as a deacon at Michaelmas 1931 (26 September) at Auckland Castle and as a priest in Advent the next year (18 December 1932) at Durham Cathedral — both times by Hensley Henson, Bishop of Durham; and was successively an assistant chaplain and tutor at his former college, a curate at Shildon and a vicar at West Hartlepool. Returning to his home city in 1948, Hughes became the warden of Southwark Diocesan Retreat House and a missioner of Southwark Cathedral. He was consecrated a bishop on 21 September 1956 at Westminster Abbey, to serve as Bishop of Croydon (at that time, one of three suffragan bishops in the Diocese of Canterbury), a position he held for over 20 years; additionally taking on the role of Bishop to the Armed Forces from 1966.

In 1964, Hughes published What difference does faith make?

Church of England titles
Preceded by Cuthbert Bardsley	Bishop of Croydon; 1956–1977	Succeeded by Stuart Snell
Preceded by Stanley Betts	Bishop to the Forces; 1966–1975	Succeeded by Stuart Snell
