= Aylmer Skelton =

Henry Aylmer Skelton (11 October 1884 – 30 August 1959) was a bishop in the mid part of the twentieth century.

He was born in 1884 and educated at Felsted, Keble College, Oxford and Bishops' College, Cheshunt. He was made deacon in Advent 1910 (18 December) at Farnham Parish Church and ordained priest in February 1912 at Chertsey Parish Church (his title church) — both times by John Randolph, Bishop suffragan of Guildford. After a curacy at Chertsey he moved to be Vicar of Epsom. After a spell in the Antipodes he became Rector of Toddington then Sub Dean of St Albans Cathedral. In 1936 he was appointed Archdeacon of St Albans then three years later Bishop of Bedford. He was consecrated a bishop on St Matthias' Day (24 February) 1939, by Cosmo Lang, Archbishop of Canterbury, at Westminster Abbey. In 1942 he was translated to be the Bishop of Lincoln where he stayed for four years only because of poor health.

Church of England titles
Preceded by Lumsden Barkway	Bishop of Bedford; 1939 – 1942	Succeeded by interregnum
Preceded by Nugent Hicks	Bishop of Lincoln; 1942 – 1946	Succeeded by Leslie Owen
