= Kenneth Stevenson (bishop) =

Bishop of Portsmouth

The Right Reverend Kenneth Stevenson
- Bishop of Portsmouth
- Portrait of Bishop Kenneth Stevenson by Celia Glover
- Diocese: Portsmouth
- In office: 1995–September 2009
- Predecessor: Timothy Bavin
- Successor: Christopher Foster
- Other posts: Chaplain, lecturer, University of Manchester (until 1995)

Orders
- Consecration: 1995

Personal details
- Born: Kenneth William Stevenson; 9 November 1949 Edinburgh, Scotland, UK
- Died: 12 January 2011 (aged 61)
- Denomination: Anglican
- Spouse: Sarah Julia Mary Glover
- Children: Elisabeth, Katharine (Kitty), James, Alexandra
- Profession: Academic (liturgy)
- Education: University of Edinburgh

Member of the House of Lords
- Lord Spiritual
- Bishop of Portsmouth; 30 November 1999 – 30 September 2009

Kenneth William Stevenson (9 November 1949 – 12 January 2011) was the eighth Bishop of Portsmouth in the Church of England.

== Life ==
Stevenson was born in Edinburgh on 19 November 1949. He was educated at Edinburgh Academy and the University of Edinburgh, taking his MA in 1970.

Stevenson was consecrated as Bishop of Portsmouth in 1995, following parish work in Lincoln, Guildford, and in the university chaplaincy at the University of Manchester. He was married, with four children.

Stevenson held a PhD from the University of Southampton and a DD from the University of Manchester where he lectured in liturgy alongside his work as a chaplain. He was involved in the Church of England's participation in the Porvoo Communion, not least because he was part-Danish. He was a Knight Commander of the Kingdom of Denmark's Order of the Dannebrog.

As Bishop, Stevenson was "a highly public bishop and loved the city's diversity. He was at home at Cowes Week or enjoying the hospitality of the Royal Navy, also moving among some of the most deprived communities in Britain."

In 2006, having been diagnosed with leukemia, Stevenson began a course of treatment and he returned to work in November. On 22 February 2009 he announced at a service at Portsmouth Cathedral that he would retire in September 2009 due to continuing ill-health. He presided at his last confirmation service on 19 July 2009 at St Peter's Church, Seaview, Isle of Wight. Stevenson commented in a statement:

"There is a sadness in the decision but I know that it is the right one. I did wrestle with it and it has proved to be the most difficult decision of my life. I have loved being your Bishop and have never wanted to be Bishop of anywhere else."

In retirement, Stevenson continued to write and give his support to fund-raising activities for Leukaemia & Lymphoma Research, e.g. through musical events and the artistic work of his daughter Alexandra. Stevenson died on 12 January 2011, his Independent obituary noting that "he was drinking champagne and listening to his favourite Bach only hours before his death". His brother-in-law, the journalist and editor Stephen Glover, wrote in The Guardian about Stevenson's death that "he accomplished it with good humour, courage and firm belief."

Stevenson had two brothers-in-law who were also bishops: David Tustin and Peter Forster. Both assisted at his funeral at Portsmouth Cathedral on 26 January 2011, along with his great friend Patricia Routledge.

== Works ==
- The Catholic Apostolic Eucharist, Doctoral Thesis, Southampton University, 1974
- Family services (Alcuin Club, 1981)
- Nuptial blessing: a study of Christian marriage rites (Alcuin Club, 1982)
- To join together: the rite of marriage (Liturgical Press, 1987) ISBN 9780814660843
- Accept this offering: the Eucharist as sacrifice today (SPCK, 1989) ISBN 9780814618233
- The first rites: Worship in the early church (Lamp Press, 1989)
- Covenant of grace renewed: a vision of the Eucharist in the seventeenth century (Darton, Longman and Todd, 1994)
- Handing on: borderlands of worship and tradition (Darton, Longman and Todd, 1996) ISBN 9780232521139
- The mystery of baptism in the Anglican tradition (Canterbury Press, 1998) ISBN 9780819217745
- All the company of heaven: a companion to the principal festivals of the Christian year (Canterbury Press, 1998)
- Abba, Father: understanding and using the Lord's prayer (Canterbury Press, 2000) ISBN 9781853113826
- Do This: The shape, style and meaning of the Eucharist (Canterbury Press, 2002) ISBN 9781848257122
- The Lord's prayer: a text in tradition (SCM Press, 2004)
- Watching and waiting: a guide to the celebration of Advent (Canterbury Press, 2007)
- Rooted in detachment: living the Transfiguration (Darton, Longman and Todd, 2007) ISBN 9780879075170
- Take, eat: reflections on the Eucharist (Canterbury Press, 2008)
- Liturgy and Interpretation (SCM Press, 2011)
- A Following Holy Life: Jeremy Taylor and His Writings (Canterbury Press, 2011) ISBN 9781853119828
