= Assheton Gorton =

English production designer (1930–2014)

Assheton St George Gorton
- Born: 10 July 1930; Sedbergh, England
- Died: 14 September 2014 (aged 84); Church Stoke, Powys, Wales
- Occupation: Production designer
- Years active: 1960–2002

Assheton St George Gorton (10 July 1930 – 14 September 2014) was an English production designer. He was educated at Sedbergh School. He was nominated for an Academy Award in the category Best Art Direction for the film The French Lieutenant's Woman and was the BAFTA nominated art director for Michelangelo Antonioni's 1966 film Blowup.

Gorton had lived in Church Stoke in Powys, Wales since 1976. He died there in his sleep on 14 September 2014; he was 84. He was the son of Neville Gorton, Bishop of Coventry from 1943 to 1952, formerly headmaster of Blundell's School.

== Selected filmography ==
- The Knack ...and How to Get It (1965)
- Blow-Up (1966)
- Wonderwall (1968)
- The Bliss of Mrs. Blossom (1968)
- The Bed-Sitting Room (1969)
- The Magic Christian (1969)
- Get Carter (1971)
- Zachariah (1971)
- The Pied Piper (1972)
- The French Lieutenant's Woman (1981)
- Legend (1985)
- Revolution (1985)
- Lost Angels (1989)
- For the Boys (1991)
- Rob Roy (1995)
- 101 Dalmatians (1996)
- 102 Dalmatians (2000)
- Shadow of the Vampire (2000)
