= William Anderson (bishop of Salisbury) =

Anglican bishop (1892–1972)

Anderson in 1937

William Louis Anderson DSC (11 February 1892 – 5 March 1972) was the Church of England Bishop of Portsmouth and then the Bishop of Salisbury. He also held what is believed to be the unique distinction of being the only bishop to have served in all three of the armed services.

== Early life ==
Anderson was born at Tezpur, Assam, India, on 11 February 1892, the younger son of James Drummond Anderson, a member of the Indian Civil Service who later became a lecturer in Bengali at the University of Cambridge. His elder brother, Sir James Drummond Anderson, also had a distinguished colonial career. He was educated as a scholar at St Paul's School and graduated BA from Gonville and Caius College, Cambridge in 1914 and MA in 1920. He was appointed an honorary fellow in 1950.

== Military service ==
He served throughout the First World War, initially in the 1st King Edward's Horse, then the Royal Naval Air Service, and finally in the newly formed Royal Air Force, ending the war with the rank of captain (later flight lieutenant from 1918 to 1919). He fought in France as a sergeant-major in King Edward's Horse, and flew American Flying Boats with the Royal Naval Air Service from Felixstowe and then the Isles of Scilly. He was awarded the Distinguished Service Cross after sinking an enemy submarine in a flying boat attack while serving in the Isles of Scilly.

== Ministry ==
On demobilisation, he studied for ordination at Ridley Hall, Cambridge. He was ordained deacon in 1920 and priest in 1921. He married Gwendoline Jones and they had two sons. He rejoined the Royal Navy as a chaplain and served in a succession of naval establishments. His last posting was as chaplain to the Britannia Royal Naval College.

In 1928, he was appointed vicar of Sparkhill, Birmingham, taking on the additional responsibility of rural dean of Bordesley. In 1932, he moved to Eastbourne. By 1937, he was Bishop of Croydon and in late 1941 he was appointed Bishop of Portsmouth to succeed the recently deceased Frank Partridge. Given his association with the Royal Navy, it is unsurprising that Anderson had responded to the offer of the post with "there is no Diocese in the Country to which I would more gladly be sent" However, in 1949, he transferred to the more senior see of Salisbury, a position he was to hold until his retirement in 1962. His wife died in 1957, and he then married Jessie Hearn in 1963. He died on 5 March 1972 aged 90.

Church of England titles
Preceded by Edward Woods	Bishop of Croydon; 1937–1942	Succeeded by Maurice Harland
Preceded by Frank Partridge	Bishop of Portsmouth; 1942–1949	Succeeded by Launcelot Fleming
Preceded by Neville Lovett	Bishop of Salisbury; 1949–1963	Succeeded by Joseph Fison
