= Wilfred Wood (bishop) =

Bishop of Croydon

The Right Reverend Wilfred Wood KA
- Bishop of Croydon
- Diocese: Diocese of Southwark
- In office: 1985–2002
- Predecessor: Stuart Snell
- Successor: Nick Baines
- Other posts: Area bishop of Croydon (1991–2002); Archdeacon of Southwark (1982–85)

Orders
- Ordination: 1961, St Michael's, Bridgetown (deacon); 1962, St Paul's, London (priest)
- Consecration: 1985

Personal details
- Born: 15 June 1936 (age 90) Barbados (Caribbean)
- Denomination: Anglican
- Residence: Christ Church, Barbados
- Parents: Wilfred & Elsie
- Spouse: Ina Smith (m. 1966)
- Children: 3 sons; 2 daughters
- Profession: Writer
- Education: Codrington College

Wilfred Denniston Wood (born 15 June 1936) is a Barbadian-British Anglican minister who was the Bishop of Croydon from 1985 to 2003 (and the first area bishop there from 1991), the first black bishop in the Church of England. He came second in the "100 Great Black Britons" list in 2004.

== Life ==
Born in Barbados to Wilfred Coward and Elsie Elmira Wood, Wood initially planned a career in Barbados politics, but felt called to the priesthood and entered Codrington College. He was ordained a deacon on the island, then in England as a priest in St Paul's Cathedral, London, in 1962, first serving as curate at St Stephen's Church, Shepherd's Bush. He married Ina Smith in 1966. They have two daughters and three sons. He soon came to wider attention in the United Kingdom for speaking out on racial justice, and published (with John D. H. Downing) Vicious Circle in 1968, insisting that the churches urgently engage in anti-racist activism. He was elected president of the Institute of Race Relations in 1971, an academic research body which also campaigned for racial justice.

In 1974 he joined the Diocese of Southwark, where he was appointed Vicar of St Laurence, Catford. In 1977 he was appointed Rural Dean of East Lewisham and Honorary Canon of Southwark Cathedral. He was Archdeacon of Southwark from 1982 until his consecration as area Bishop of Croydon in 1985, where he oversaw the 102 parishes of the Croydon Episcopal Area and assisted the Bishop of Southwark.

Wood was a champion for racial justice, launching several initiatives and serving on many committees. In 1968, Wood and colleagues submitted proposals for the replacement of the National Committee for Commonwealth Immigrants (NCCI) with a Community Relations Commission that came to be known as "the Wood Proposals". The proposals called for some members to be directly elected by minority ethnic associations. Following the assassination of Martin Luther King Jr. in 1968 and a visit to London by his widow Coretta in 1969, he was instrumental with Canon L. John Collins in founding the UK's Martin Luther King Fund and Foundation.

In 1992 he co-sponsored with David Sheppard, the then Bishop of Liverpool, a new set of race equality principles for employers, which became known as the "Wood-Sheppard Principles". He was Moderator of the Southwark Diocesan Race Relations Commission, the first of its kind in the Church of England, from its foundation. He also served as Moderator of the World Council of Churches's Programme to Combat Racism, 1977 - 1980, which was known for its support for humanitarian projects of southern African liberation movements at a crucial time in their struggle. In his last years as Bishop of Croydon, he protested at the honours given to Enoch Powell upon his death, stating, "Enoch Powell gave a certificate of respectability to white racist views which otherwise decent people were ashamed to acknowledge" and, in 2000 against the then British government's and opposition's negative attitudes to asylum seekers

Wood was also involved in Croydon life outside of the church, serving as a board member for the local Mayday Hospital for more than ten years, and also Chair of the Tramlink Penalty Fares Appeals Panel. In 2002 he was made an Honorary Freeman of the London Borough of Croydon.

Bishop Wilfred Wood was President of the Royal Philanthropic Society, dedicated to the welfare of young people at risk. He served on the Royal Commission on Criminal Procedure (1978–80) under Sir Cyril Philips, which recommended the establishment of the Crown Prosecution Service. Other national bodies on which he served included the board of the Housing Corporation for an unprecedented three terms (1986-1995) where he supported local housing associations and promoted black housing associations, in which the "instrument of control" was 10/12ths black in composition. He was a founder-member of a number of housing associations. In later years Bishop Wilfred Wood Close, in Peckham, South East London, Bishop Wilfred Wood Court, in Plaistow, East London, and Bishop Wilfred Wood House in Brook Green, West London, were named after him.

He was also vice-chair of the Archbishops' Commission on Urban Priority Areas which undertook two years of explorations of the conditions in inner cities and deprived outer estates and published the explosive report Faith in the City in 1985. It challenged the Thatcher government to give appropriate support to those that were being left behind in deprived areas. It also led to the Church establishing the Church Urban Fund which supported projects in local communities (not only church-based communities).

He holds honorary doctorates from the Open University, the University of the West Indies and the General Theological Seminary, New York, when he was described in the citation as "a wide and trusted defender of the rights of minorities."

== Criticism ==
In 1988, as bishop of Croydon, Wood was a character witness in favour of David Tudor, a priest who had previously been found to have committed child sexual abuse, describing him as having "the utmost integrity". Tudor was later found to have committed offences and some action was taken against him, culminating in 2025 in a ban for life from the Church of England. A victim of Tudor in 2024 filed formal complaints of misconduct under the Church's disciplinary system against Wood, archbishop of York Stephen Cottrell, and David Tudor.

== Retirement and honours ==
On 30 November 2000 – Barbados Independence Day – Queen Elizabeth II appointed Wood a Knight of St Andrew, the highest class within the Order of Barbados "for his contribution to race relations in the United Kingdom and general contribution to the welfare of Barbadians living here".

Wood retired as Bishop of Croydon on 30 September 2002 and was succeeded in 2003 by Nick Baines. In 2002, he returned with his wife to their native Barbados. In 2004, Wood was voted by the public as second only to Mary Seacole on a list of the "100 Great Black Britons". He has been blind since 2004.

== Publications ==
- 1968 (with John D. H. Downing) Vicious Circle SPCK, London, UK.
- 1994 Keep the Faith, Baby!: A Bishop Speaks on Faith, Evangelism, Race Relations and Community The Bible Reading Fellowship, London, UK.
- 2010 Faith for a Glad Fool: The Church of England's First Black Bishop Speaks on Racial Justice, Christian Faith, Love and Sacrifice. New Beacon Books Ltd, London, UK.
