= John Yates (bishop) =

English Anglican bishop

The Right Reverend John Yates
- Bishop at Lambeth
- Church: Church of England
- In office: 1992–1994 (retired)
- Predecessor: Ronald Gordon
- Successor: Frank Sargeant
- Other posts: Honorary assistant bishop in Winchester (1994–2008); Bishop of Gloucester (1975–1992); Bishop of Whitby (1972–1975); Principal, Lichfield Theological College (1966–1972)

Orders
- Ordination: c. 1951 (deacon); c. 1952 (priest)
- Consecration: 1972

Personal details
- Born: 17 April 1925
- Died: 26 February 2008 (aged 82)
- Denomination: Anglican
- Parents: Frank & Edith
- Spouse: Jean Dover (m. 1954; d. 1995); Beryl Wensley (m. 1998; d. 2006)
- Children: 1 son; 2 daughter
- Education: Jesus College, Cambridge

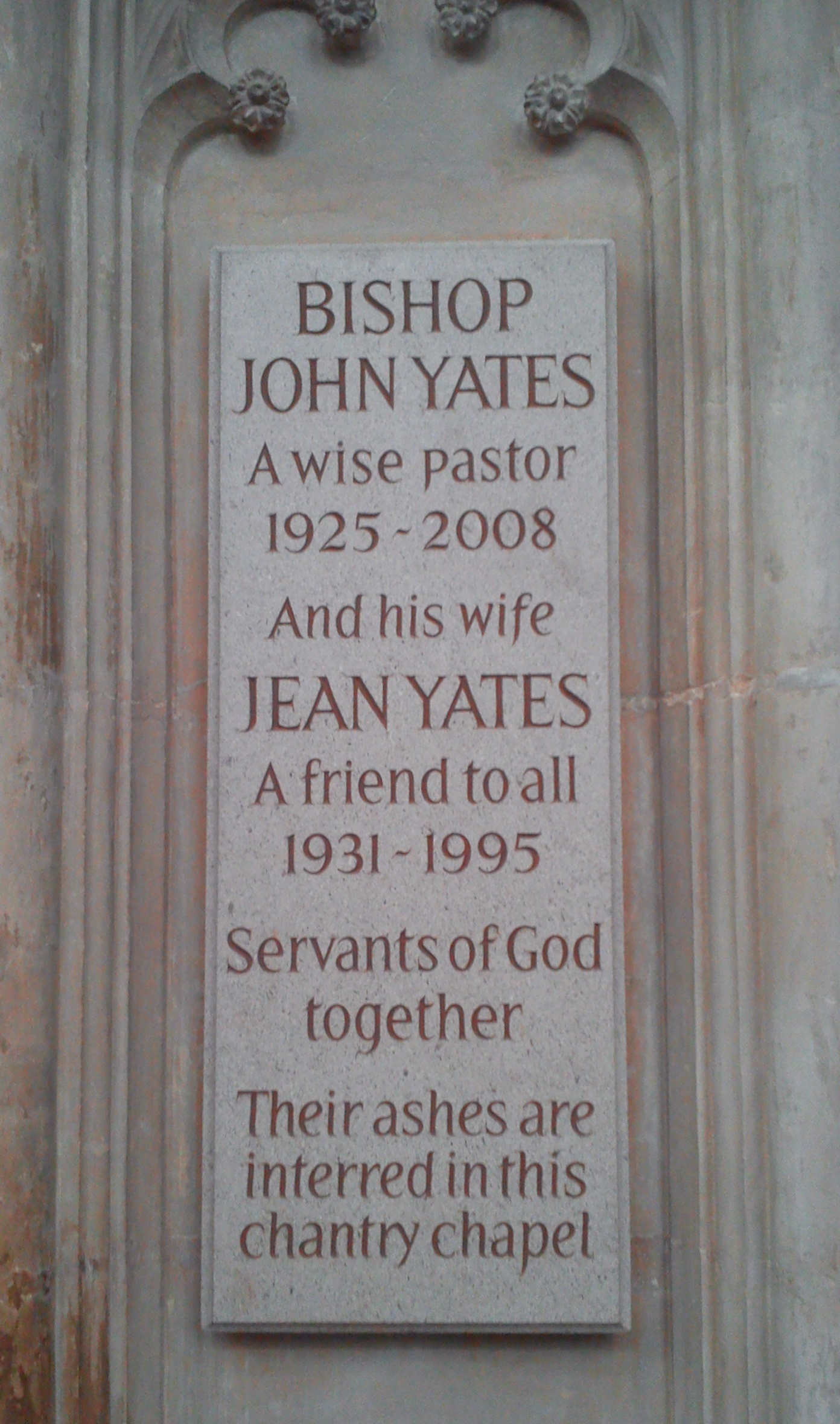
Gloucester Cathedral, memorial to Bishop John Yates

John Yates (17 April 1925 – 26 February 2008) was an Anglican bishop in the Church of England. He was a bishop for 22 years, serving as the Bishop of Whitby from 1972 to 1975, the Bishop of Gloucester from 1975 to 1992 and the Bishop at Lambeth from 1992 to 1994.

== Early life ==
Yates was born in Burslem, Staffordshire on 17 April 1925 (some sources say South London). He was educated first at Battersea Grammar School, then after his evacuation as a result of the outbreak of the Second World War he completed his schooling at Blackpool Grammar School.

He undertook war service in the Royal Air Force Volunteer Reserve becoming a bomb-aimer. Following the war, he went up to Jesus College, Cambridge as a Scholar, taking a first-class degree in theology (some reports say history). He held a Cambridge Master of Arts (MA Cantab).

== Ministry ==
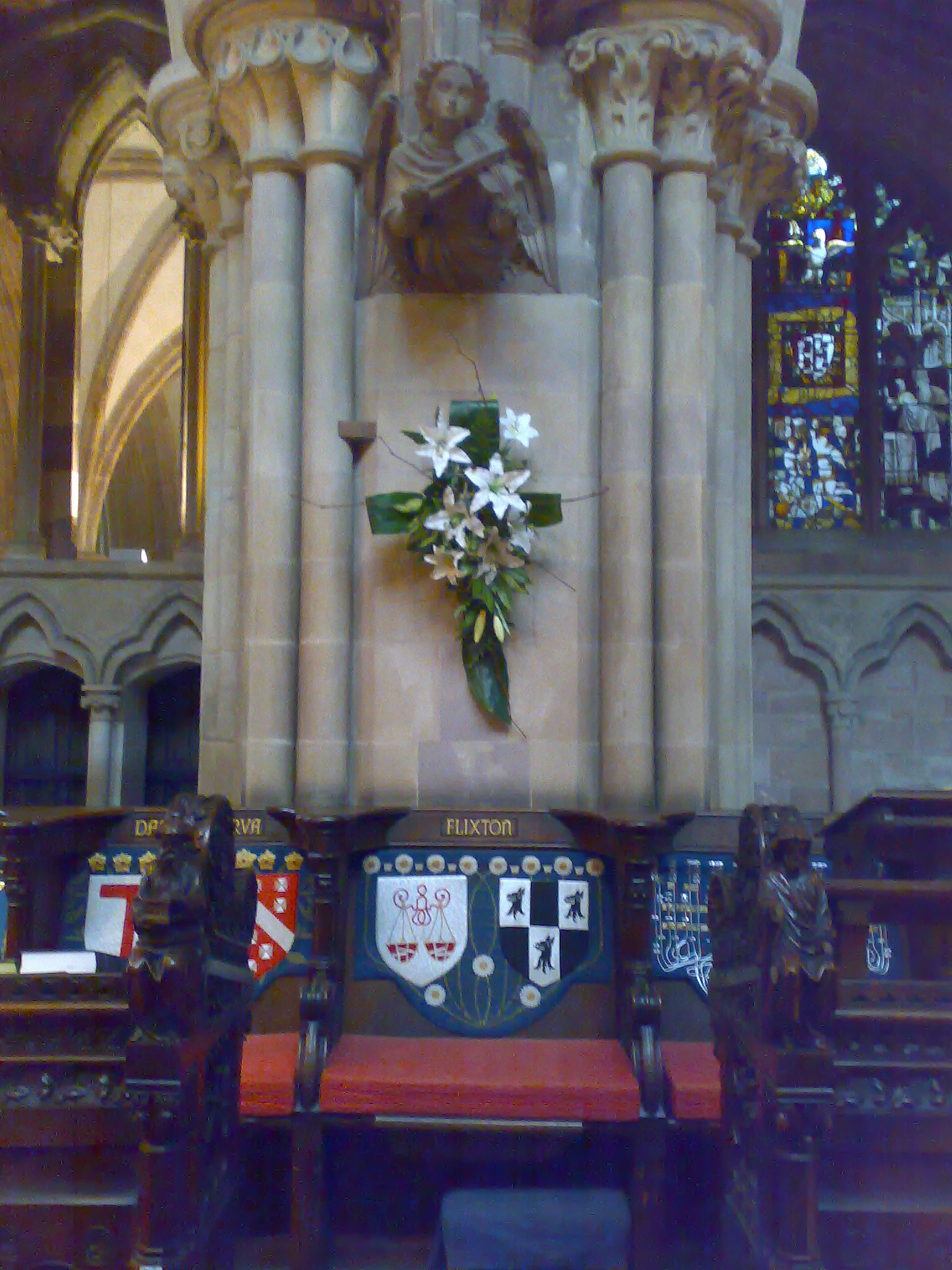
The prebendal stall of Flixton in Lichfield Cathedral which Yates held

He then trained for ordination at Lincoln Theological College and was ordained deacon at St Paul's Cathedral, before embarking on his ecclesiastical career with a curacy at Christ Church Southgate, in north London.

He had a second spell at Lincoln Theological College as Chaplain, (1954–59) and after a six years spent as a parish priest at Bottesford-with-Ashby on the outskirts of Scunthorpe he was appointed as principal of Lichfield Theological College (1966–72). He also held the position of Prebendary of Flixton at Lichfield Cathedral. The Lincoln college was threatened with closure, and Archbishop of York Donald Coggan invited him to become Bishop of Whitby (a suffragan bishop in the Diocese of York) in 1972. In 1975, he was nominated as Bishop of Gloucester, one of the early appointments of the new Crown Appointments Commission. He and his first wife carried on a practical ministry, daily distributing tea and sandwiches to homeless callers.

In 1979, he chaired a group of 12 scholars appointed by the General Synod's Board for Social Responsibility which produced a report on homosexual relationships. The Gloucester Report controversially contemplated homosexual relationships "involving a physical expression of sexual love". He was also involved in peace efforts in Central America in 1987 and 1988. He led the UK delegation to a conference of the World Council of Churches in Basel. He was chair of the General Synod Board for Social Responsibility from 1987 to 1991.

He actively took part in the review of sexual assaults committed by the nowadays infamous sex offender Peter Ball (bishop).

After 17 years as Bishop of Gloucester, he became the right-hand man of newly appointed Archbishop of Canterbury, George Carey, with the title Bishop at Lambeth. He retired to Winchester in 1994.

== Personal life ==
He married Jean Dover in 1954. They had one son and two daughters. His first wife died in 1995. He remarried in 1998, to fellow priest Beryl Wensley. His second wife died in 2006 (some reports say 2007). He died in Winchester.

Church of England titles
Preceded by George Snow	Bishop of Whitby; 1972–1975	Succeeded by Clifford Barker
Preceded by Basil Guy	Bishop of Gloucester; 1975–1992	Succeeded by Peter Ball
Preceded by Ronald Gordon	Bishop at Lambeth; 1992–1994	Succeeded by Frank Sargeant
