= Anglican Bishop of Portsmouth =

Diocesan bishop in the Church of England

Bishop of Portsmouth
- Bishopric

anglican
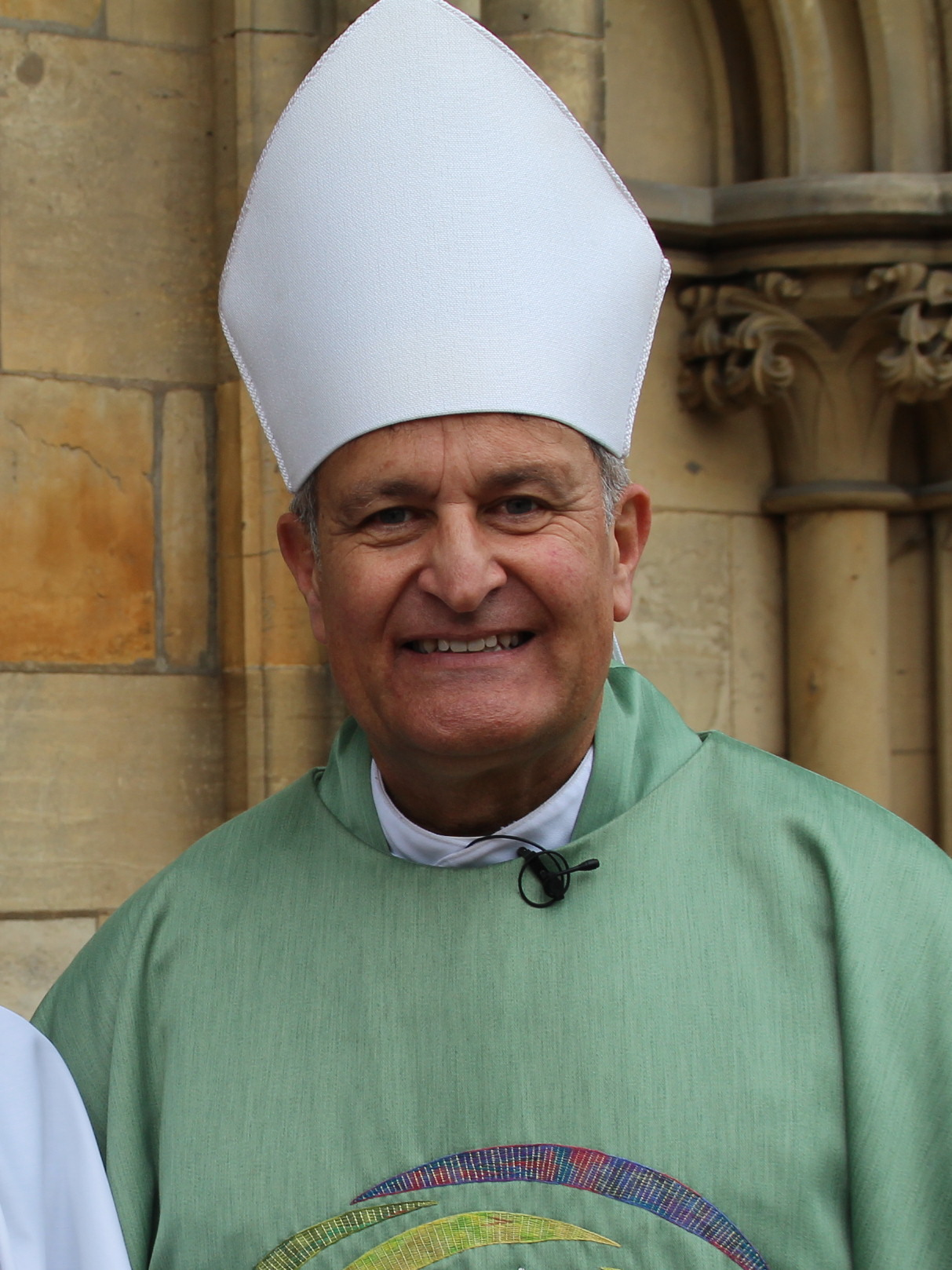
- Incumbent: Jonathan Frost

Location
- Ecclesiastical province: Canterbury
- Residence: Bishopsgrove, Fareham

Information
- Established: 1927
- Diocese: Portsmouth
- Cathedral: Portsmouth Cathedral

The Bishop of Portsmouth is the Ordinary of the Church of England Diocese of Portsmouth in the Province of Canterbury.

The diocese covers south-east Hampshire and the Isle of Wight and has its see in the City of Portsmouth, where the seat is located at the Cathedral Church of Saint Thomas of Canterbury which was elevated to cathedral status in 1927. The bishop's residence is Bishopsgrove, Fareham.

The office of bishop was created in 1927 when the new diocese was formed from part of the Diocese of Winchester. Jonathan Frost has been the Bishop of Portsmouth since his election was confirmed on 18 January 2022. He was installed as the tenth Bishop of Portsmouth on 12 March 2022.

== List of Anglican Bishops of Portsmouth ==
Anglican Bishops of Portsmouth
From	Until	Incumbent	Notes
1927	1936	Neville Lovett	Nominated on 7 June and consecrated on 25 July 1927; translated to Salisbury on 23 April 1936
1936	1941	Frank Partridge	Nominated on 12 May and consecrated on 24 June 1936; died in office on 1 October 1941
1942	1949	William Anderson	Translated from Croydon; nominated 12 February and confirmed on 19 March 1942; translated to Salisbury on 14 June 1949
1949	1959	Launcelot Fleming	Nominated on 13 September and consecrated on 18 October 1949; translated to Norwich on 18 December 1959
1960	1975	John Phillips	Nominated on 29 January and consecrated on 25 March 1960; resigned on 31 July 1975; died on 1 November 1985
1975	1984	Ronald Gordon	Nominated on 5 August and consecrated on 23 September 1975; resigned on 31 May 1984; he subsequently became Bishop at Lambeth (1984–1991) and Bishop to the Forces (1985–1990); died on 8 August 2015
1984	1995	Timothy Bavin	Translated from Johannesburg; nominated on 2 November 1984 and confirmed on 7 January 1985; retired in 1995
1995	2009	Kenneth Stevenson	Nominated and consecrated in 1995; retired in September 2009.
2009	2010	Ian Brackley, Bishop of Dorking	acting bishop during vacancy
2010	2021	Christopher Foster	Translated from Hertford; nominated on 9 February, and installed and enthroned at Portsmouth Cathedral on 18 September 2010. Retired 28 April 2021.
2021	2022	Rob Wickham, area Bishop of Edmonton	part-time acting bishop during vacancy, 28 April 2021–18 January 2022
2022	present	Jonathan Frost	Former Dean of York and Bishop of Southampton; elected 2 December 2021; confirmed 18 January 2022.

== Assistant bishops ==
Among those called "Assistant Bishop of Portsmouth" have been:

- 1939–1959 (ret.): Arthur Kitching, Vicar of Holy Trinity Fareham (until 1945), then Archdeacon of Portsmouth (until 1952), former Bishop on the Upper Nile
- 1959–1967 (ret.): Bryan Robin, retired Bishop of Adelaide
