= Frank Partridge (bishop) =

British bishop

Frank Partridge (31 December 1877 – October, 1941) was the second Anglican Bishop of Portsmouth.

== Early life ==
Partridge was born, the son of a Canadian, on 31 December 1877. He was educated privately. before taking Holy Orders at Cuddesdon College, his first curacy being at Hawarden. In 1910 he married Elizabeth Barton: together they had two sons and one daughter.

== Posts within Chichester diocese ==
That year he began a 24-year association with the West Sussex area. He was Chaplain to the Bishop of Chichester until 1918, and from then until 1934 a Canon: additionally serving as Editor of the Chichester Diocesan Kalendar and Gazette from 1914 until 1921, Financial Secretary of the National Assembly of the Church of England, 1921–34, Proctor in Convocation and Prebendary of Sidlesham.

== Career advances ==
In 1934 Partridge was appointed a Chaplain to the King, Archdeacon of Oakham and Canon Residentiary of Peterborough Cathedral, in which post he was also Examining Chaplain to the Bishop. In 1937 he was appointed Bishop of Portsmouth, a post he was to hold to his death in October 1941 aged 63. After a funeral service at Portsmouth Cathedral he was interred at East Meon. He was known as

"A man of wise counsel and clear vision" The Earl of Athlone

== Bibliography ==
- 1918 The Soul of Wealth
- 1921TAB:A Memoir of Thomas Allnutt, 2nd Earl Brassey
- 1928 The Bishop of Portsmouth and the publication of the rejected prayer book. Correspondence of the Bishop with the Rev. W.A. Limbrick, Secretary of the Protestant Reformation Society to which is added a correspondence of the Secretary with the Rev. Canon F. Partridge upon the same subject.
- 1929 Disestablishment
- 1930 The Church Assembly and the Church
- 1940 The Church House; its art and symbolism by BAKER, Herbert Sir

Church Assembly, 1940 (With an introduction on its history and aims by the bishop of Portsmouth.)

Church of England titles
Preceded by Neville Lovett	Bishop of Portsmouth; 1937 – 1942	Succeeded by William Louis Anderson
