= Neville Gorton =

Anglican bishop of Coventry

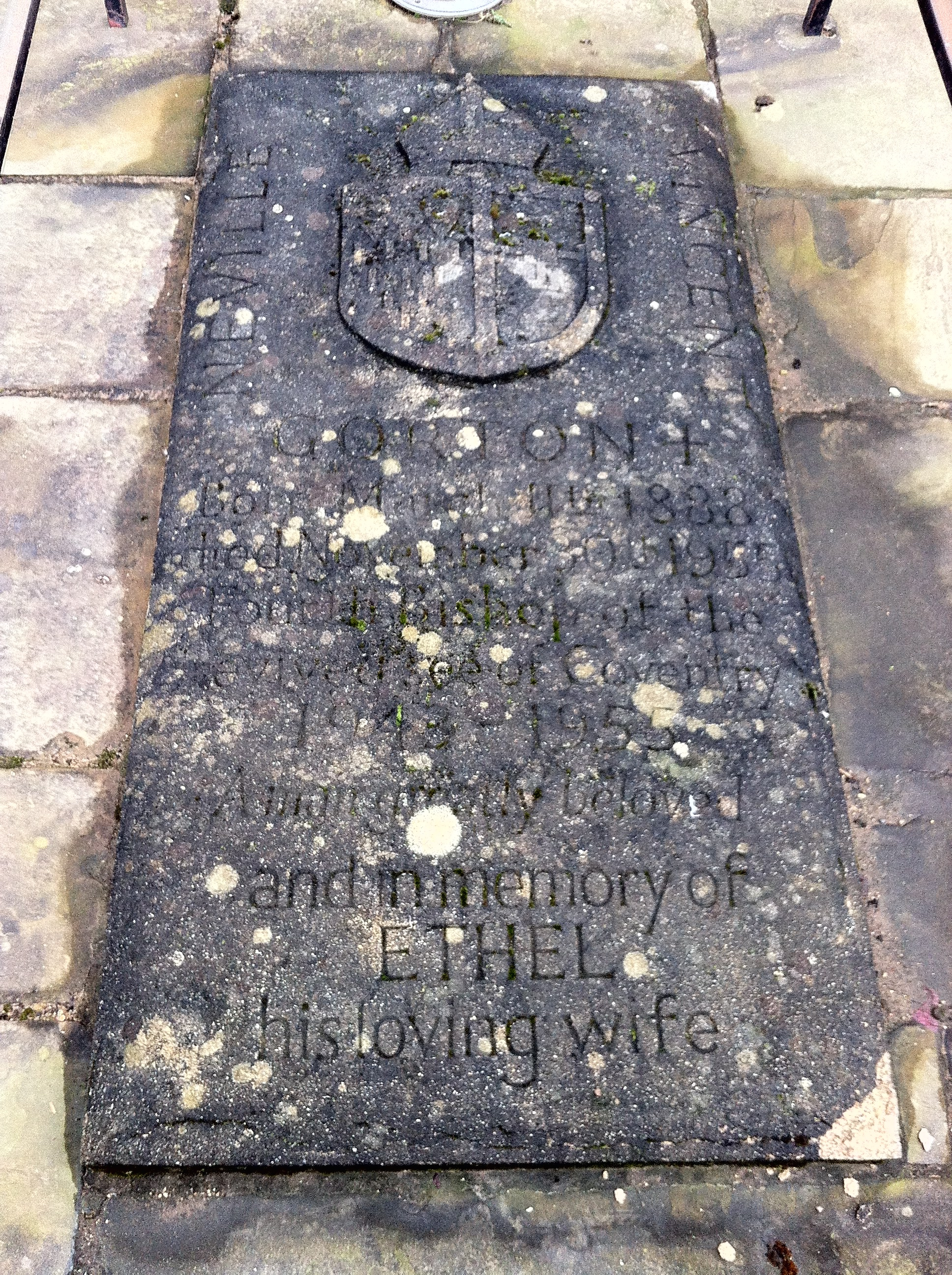
Memorial to Bishop Gorton in the remains of the old Coventry Cathedral

Neville Vincent Gorton (1 March 1888 – 30 November 1955) was an Anglican cleric who served as the fourth bishop of the restored see of Coventry in the modern era.

Gorton was born on 1 March 1888, the son of Anglican Rev. Canon C. V. Gorton, and educated at Marlborough College and Balliol College, Oxford, where he was an exhibitioner and Aubrey Moore student. Gorton was a career school-master who after taking holy orders spent 20 years at Sedbergh School, during which time he married Ethel Ingledew Daggett, with whom he had two sons (including the production designer Assheton Gorton) and one daughter rising to the rank of housemaster. He was then appointed head of Blundell's School where he was to remain until the call to face the challenges of a severely bombed diocese.

Gorton supported ecumenism and Christian unity, envisioning the reconstructed Coventry Cathedral as a "People's cathedral". In theological matters, he took a traditional stance against the remarriage of divorced persons in church, while his pastoral work in schools influenced a pragmatic approach to pastoral care. Known for his concise sermons, Gorton remained in office until his death on 30 November 1955 at the age of 67.

Sir Basil Spence, the architect of the new Coventry Cathedral, considered Gorton to be a saint, writing "I have never met such a 'good' man, and one who had no sense of possessiveness whatsoever; he desired nothing except the things of the spirit."

== Notes ==
Religious titles
Preceded by Mervyn George Haigh	Bishop of Coventry; 1943–1955	Succeeded by Cuthbert Bardsley
