= Neville Lovett =

English religious leader (1869–1951)

Ernest Neville Lovett, CBE (16 February 1869 – 8 September 1951) served as the Bishop of Portsmouth in the Church of England from 1927 to 1936 and as the Bishop of Salisbury from 1936 to 1946.

== Life ==
Lovett was born in Torquay on 16 February 1869 and educated at Sherborne School and Christ's College, Cambridge.

Lovett was ordained in 1892 and served as priest at Clifton, Wymynswold in Kent (now called Womenswold), Bishop's Caundle in Dorset and Shanklin on the Isle of Wight. He was Rector of Farnham, Surrey from 1908 to 1912.

In 1909 Lovett produced a historical tableaux describing the history of Farnham since the Roman period which was played in the newly built church house. This representation was developed as the "Farnham Historical Episodes" performed in the Farnham Castle ground in 1910.

In 1912 Lovett wrote another historical pageant, The passing of the Bailiff: a play of Georgian Farnham: recalling certain incidents there in the year 1793 (circa) and the people who took part therein. This was successfully performed and the text published.

In February 1925 he was appointed Vicar of Portsmouth and in March collated as the first Archdeacon of Portsmouth. When the new diocese of Portsmouth was created on 1 May 1927 he was elevated to be its first bishop. His appointment as Bishop of Portsmouth was recorded in The Times on 25 May 1927. He was 58 at the time of the appointment. He was enthroned on 4 October 1927.

In May 1936, he was appointed the Bishop of Salisbury. He announced in May 1945 that he would resign on 30 April 1946. He died aged 82 on 8 September 1951. His obituary appeared in The Times on 10 September 1951.

Until it was replaced by the Fareham Academy in 2013, there was a school in Fareham, Hampshire called the Neville Lovett Community School. There is another Bishop Lovett School at Ryde on the Isle of Wight.

He married Evelyn Brock in 1894. They had five daughters. She died in 1937.

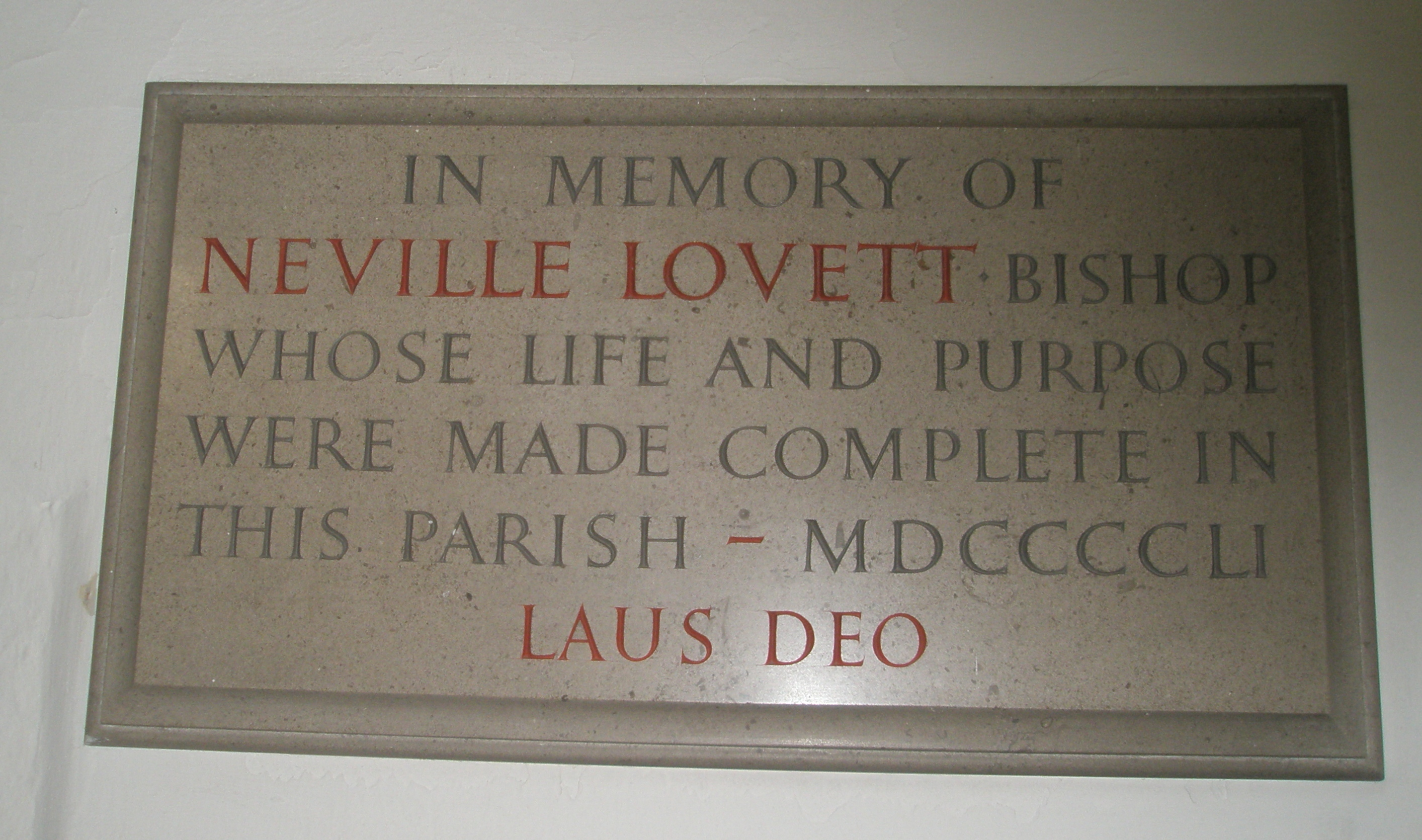
Plaque at St Mary & All Saints, Droxford

In retirement he lived at Meon Lea, Droxford.

== Works ==
The British Library lists the following publications:

- Doorstep Papers. (1916)
- Shadow Tales of Portsmouth Cathedral. [With illustrations.] (1936)
- Shadow tales of Portsmouth cathedral (1938)
- Village Faith and Village Fellowship. Six outlines for addresses, etc. (1945)

Church of England titles
Preceded by Inaugural appointment	Bishop of Portsmouth; 1927 – 1936	Succeeded by Frank Partridge
Preceded by St Clair Donaldson	Bishop of Salisbury; 1936 – 1946	Succeeded by William Louis Anderson
