= Timothy Bavin =

British Anglican bishop and monk

The Right Reverend Dom Timothy Bavin OSB FRSCM
- Bishop of Portsmouth
- Church: Church of England
- Diocese: Portsmouth
- In office: 1985–1995
- Predecessor: Ronald Gordon
- Successor: Kenneth Stevenson
- Other posts: Oblate master, Alton Abbey (?–present); Honorary assistant bishop in Portsmouth (2012–present); monk, Alton Abbey (1996–present) & honorary assistant bishop in Winchester (2013–present); Bishop of Johannesburg (1974–1984)

Orders
- Ordination: 1961 (deacon); 1962 (priest)
- Consecration: 1974

Personal details
- Born: 17 September 1935 (age 91)
- Denomination: Anglican
- Parents: Edward Durrance & Marjorie Bavin
- Education: Worcester College, Oxford

Timothy John Bavin OSB FRSCM (born 17 September 1935) is a British Anglican bishop and monk. He was the bishop of Anglican Diocese of Johannesburg from 1974 to 1985. He was then Bishop of Portsmouth from 1985 to 1995.

== Early life and education ==
Bavin was born the son of Lieutenant Colonel Ernest Sydney Durrance Bavin RASC and Marjorie Gwendoline (née Dew) Bavin, on 17 September 1935. He was educated at St George's School, Windsor Castle and Brighton College.

He graduated from Worcester College, Oxford with a degree in Literae Humaniores in 1959 (Bachelor of Arts, Master of Arts 1961). During the following two years, Bavin completed his National Service in his father's old regiment. He was commissioned in 1958 and served as a Platoon Officer in Aden.

== Ordained ministry ==
Returning to Oxford, Bavin studied for ordination at Cuddesdon College. He was made deacon in 1961 and ordained priest in 1962, spending the period 1961–69 (and then 1973–85) in South Africa. He was the first Chaplain of St. Alban's College, Pretoria, then a curate at Uckfield with Little Horsted and finally Vicar of the Parish of the Good Shepherd, Brighton from 1971 to 1973.

In 1973 Bavin became the dean and rector of the cathedral parish of Johannesburg as well as archdeacon of the diocese and, in 1974 at a turbulent period in that country's history, its bishop, a position he was to hold until 1985. He was elected to the See of Johannesburg on 3 September 1974 and consecrated a bishop that year. From 1985 to 1995 he was Bishop of Portsmouth, during which time he was appointed an honorary fellow of the Royal School of Church Music.

In 1987 he became a member of the Oratory of the Good Shepherd. After resigning his bishopric he was professed as a monk of the Benedictine community at Alton Abbey. As a result, Bavin has curtailed his involvement in the Athenaeum and the Royal Yacht Squadron, although he does occasionally preach at other Christian places of worship. As part of the dissolution of Alton Abbey, Bavin moved from the abbey buildings to an almshouse associated with Chichester Cathedral.

A number of serious safeguarding issues took place within the Anglican Diocese of Portsmouth during his time as bishop. For example, he did not report Father Terry Knight to the police when parents raised their concerns to him in 1985. Father Terry Knight was allowed to carry on in his position and until he was finally convicted for sexually abusing boys in 1996 and again in 2016. Timothy Bavin had also allowed a convicted child sex offender priest called Father Michael Gover to carry on working for the church on his release in 1990. Father Michael Gover was convicted in 1985 at around the same time as parents raising their concerns about Father Terry Knight.

== Personal life ==
In 1994, Bavin was named as one of ten gay bishops in the Church of England by OutRage!, an LGBT activist group.

== Publications ==
- In Tune with Heaven: Report of the Archbishops' Commission on Church Music. Church House Publishing and Hodder & Stoughton. 1992. ISBN 978-0-7151-3744-4. "Report by The Archbishops' Commission on Church Music, of which Bavin was chairman"
- Deacons in the Ministry of the Church: A Report to the House of Bishops of the General Synod of the Church of England. Church House Publishing. 1988. ISBN 978-0-7151-3718-5.

== See also ==
Anglican Church of Southern Africa titles
Preceded by Leslie Stradling	Bishop of Johannesburg; 1974–1984	Succeeded by Desmond Tutu
Church of England titles
Preceded by Ronald Gordon	Bishop of Portsmouth; 1985–1995	Succeeded by Kenneth Stevenson
