= John Phillips (bishop of Portsmouth) =

The Right Reverend John Phillips
- Bishop of Portsmouth
- Church: Church of England
- Diocese: Diocese of Portsmouth
- In office: 1960 to 1975
- Predecessor: Launcelot Fleming
- Successor: Ronald Gordon

Orders
- Ordination: 1934 (deacon); 1935 (priest)
- Consecration: 25 March 1960 by Geoffrey Fisher

Personal details
- Born: John Henry Lawrence Phillips; 2 February 1910
- Died: 1 November 1985 (aged 75)
- Denomination: Anglicanism
- Education: University of Cambridge; Ridley Hall, Cambridge

John Henry Lawrence Phillips (2 February 1910 – 1 November 1985) was an Anglican bishop who served as the Bishop of Portsmouth from 1960 until 1975.

== Birth and education ==
Phillips was born the son of a clergyman, and attended Weymouth College. He graduated from the University of Cambridge in 1932, but remained in Cambridge for his ordination training at Ridley Hall from 1932 to 1934. He took his Master of Arts degree in 1937.

== Ministry career ==
Phillips was made a deacon on Trinity Sunday 1934 (27 May) at Christ Church, Harrogate (his title), by Edward Burroughs, Bishop of Ripon; and ordained a priest the next Trinity Sunday (16 June 1935) at Ripon Cathedral, by Geoffrey Lunt, Bishop of Ripon. He served two curacies at Yorkshire parishes, and then became a vicar, additionally joining the Royal Naval Volunteer Reserve (RNVR) as a chaplain during World War II, eventually becoming Director of Service Ordinands.

When peace came he was appointed the general secretary of the Churches' Council of Training for the Ministry, then Archdeacon of Nottingham. In 1959 he was appointed a chaplain to Queen Elizabeth II.

In 1960 his nomination to be the Bishop of Portsmouth was approved by the Queen; his election was confirmed at St Mary-le-Bow on 24 March. He was consecrated a bishop the next day (Lady Day 1960) by Geoffrey Fisher, Archbishop of Canterbury at Westminster Abbey; although he had to wait a further 7 years for elevation to the House of Lords. As bishop, he supported the ordination of Roy Cotton (who had been found guilty of indecently exposing himself to a child in 1954) and, in correspondence with Lambeth Palace, "continued to minimise the severity of Cotton's offending": Cotton would go on to re-offend during his ordained ministry. Phillips resigned his bishopric in 1975 owing to ill health, and took a post running a small rural parish church in Dorset.

== Private life ==
Phillips married Morna Wingfield-King in 1936, daughter of Edward Hertslet William Wingfield King OBE and Dora Jane Downie Leslie, and they had three daughters and a son.

He became a Freemason in 1954 in the Royal Sussex Lodge No 402 (Nottingham) and remained active in the organisation throughout his life. As Bishop of Portsmouth he renewed his connections with the Royal Navy and in 1960 (the year of his enthronement) he also joined Navy Lodge No 2612 in London, where he remained active until his death in 1985. In Portsmouth he joined the local Phoenix Lodge No 257 and became its Worshipful Master in 1965. From 1974 to 1978 he held the leading role of Provincial Grand Master responsible for all lodges in the Province of Hampshire and Isle of Wight, following a grand investiture ceremony at Portsmouth Guildhall conducted by William Cadogan, 7th Earl Cadogan on 20 September 1974.

He also sailed and played golf; in retirement he lived in Ipswich.

Church of England titles
Preceded by Launcelot Fleming	Bishop of Portsmouth; 1960–1975	Succeeded by Ronald Gordon
