= Henry Pereira =

Irish clergyman (1845-1926)

- Bishop of Croydon
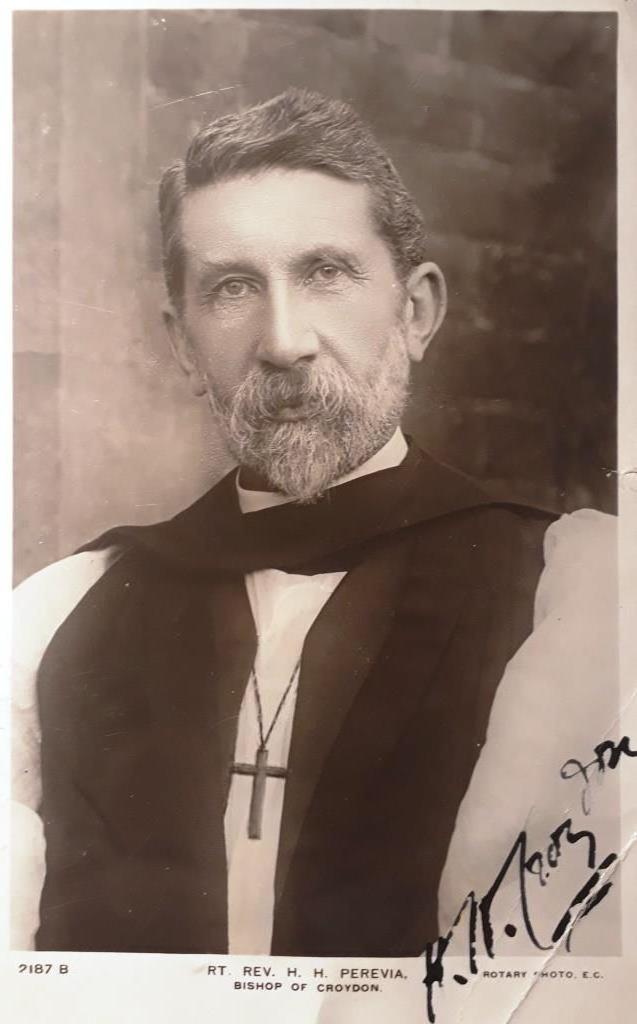
- 1904 photograph of Pereira
- Diocese: Diocese of Canterbury
- In office: 1904–1924 (ret.)
- Successor: Edward Woods
- Other post: Rector of All Hallows Lombard Street (1904–1926)

Orders
- Ordination: 1869
- Consecration: 1904 by Randall Davidson (Canterbury)

Personal details
- Born: 16 January 1845
- Died: 1 January 1926 (aged 80)
- Denomination: Anglican
- Education: Trinity College, Dublin

Henry Horace Pereira (16 January 1845 – 1 January 1926) was an Anglican suffragan bishop during the first quarter of the 20th century.

Pereira was born in 1845, educated at Trinity College, Dublin and ordained in 1869. He served two curacies before becoming the first Warden of the Wilberforce Memorial Mission in South London. Hampshire incumbencies followed before a 30-year association with the Croydon area (which was then a peculiar of the Archbishop of Canterbury, firstly as Rural Dean and (from 1904) Bishop of Croydon, suffragan bishop to the Archbishop. He was consecrated a bishop on the Feast of the Conversion of Saint Paul 1904 (25 January), at Westminster Abbey by Randall Davidson, Archbishop of Canterbury. As an endowment, he was also appointed to All Hallows Lombard Street in the same year; when he resigned his See in 1924, he retained the benefice of Lombard-Street until death.

He was Honorary Canon of Canterbury Cathedral, and an Honorary Chaplain to Queen Victoria from January 1900 until her death the following year.

"A man of great energy and a most effective speaker", he died on New Year's Day, 1926.
