= Richard Llewellin =

British Anglican bishop (born 1938)

- Bishop at Lambeth
- In office: 1999–2004
- Predecessor: Frank Sargeant
- Successor: vacant
- Other posts: Bishop of Dover; 1992–1999; Bishop of St Germans; 1985–1992

Orders
- Ordination: 1964 (deacon); 1964 (priest)
- Consecration: 1985

Personal details
- Born: 30 September 1938 (age 88)
- Denomination: Anglican
- Education: Fitzwilliam College, Cambridge

John Richard Allan Llewellin (born 30 September 1938) is a retired Anglican bishop in the Church of England.

Llewellin was educated at Clifton College, Bristol and Fitzwilliam College, Cambridge. He was made a deacon at Michaelmas 1964 (20 September) and ordained priest the Michaelmas following (19 September 1965) — both times by Michael Gresford Jones, Bishop of St Albans, at St Albans Cathedral; and was a curate at Radlett. After serving a second curacy at Johannesburg Cathedral, and being expelled from South Africa by the apartheid Nationalist government of the day in 1971, he was then successively the Vicar of Waltham Cross, the Rector of Harpenden and a canon of Truro Cathedral and ordained to the episcopate as the suffragan Bishop of St Germans (1985–92). He was consecrated a bishop by Robert Runcie, Archbishop of Canterbury, on All Saints' Day 1985 (1 November) at Westminster Abbey.

He later became the suffragan Bishop of Dover (1992–99) and was subsequently appointed Bishop at Lambeth and Chief of Staff to the Archbishop of Canterbury (then George Carey), a position he held until 2003. While serving as Bishop of Dover he was appointed an honorary fellow of Canterbury Christ Church University. He also served as Chairman of the Anglican Society for the Welfare of Animals from 2004 until 2013.

Llewellin was accused of failing to take appropriate action or to launch an investigation into General Synod member Jeremy Dowling in 1986. Llewellin was working in the Diocese of Truro from 1985. Dowling in 2015 was convicted of sex offences against boys whilst a school teacher in the 1970s. A 2018 case review found, “There is no doubt that there were a number of missed opportunities for the diocese of Truro to undertake its own investigations into the allegations made in 1972 against Jeremy Dowling.” Llewellin was one of four bishops in the diocese who failed to take action. When questioned by the inquiry stated he had no recollection of reading Dowling's file which contained details of past allegations that the Director of Public Prosecutions decided not to prosecute Dowling for in 1972.

Church of England titles
Preceded by Br Michael (Fisher)	Bishop of St Germans; 1985–1992	Succeeded by Graham James
