= Stuart Snell =

British Anglican bishop

(Geoffrey) Stuart Snell (1920–1988) was a British Anglican bishop. He was born in Devon on the 25 October 1920 and educated at Exeter School and St Peter's College, Oxford. Snell entered the Anglican ministry from the parish of Emmanuel, Northwood, London where he was a member of the laity. He had already done some training under Donald Coggan, and in the early 1960s decided to go forward for ministry. The Bishop of London suggested that he remain in his own house and serve as a second curate in the Parish of Emmanuel. He brought to the ministry immense gifts of mind and heart, and the then vicar, Martin Parsons declared "it was a joy to have him and Margaret with us in the work."

Eventually some years later in 1977 Snell was made Bishop of Croydon, and Parsons was greatly honoured when he was asked by the Archbishop to preach the sermon at Snell's consecration. The Rt. Revd. Stuart Snell was also Bishop to the Forces and in 1983 visited the Falkland Islands to conduct a memorial service for all those who died in the conflict. He also consecrated cemeteries on the Islands. Snell died in Westminster in July 1988, aged 67 years old.

Snell married Margaret Lonsdale Geary. Their son Adrian Snell is a songwriter and another son, Christopher Snell, died on 14 June 2008 of cancer. He was an actor.

Church of England titles
Preceded by John Hughes	Bishop of Croydon; 1977–1985	Succeeded by Wilfred Wood
Preceded by John Hughes	Bishop to the Forces; 1977–1984	Succeeded by Ronald Gordon
