= Bishop of Croydon =

Episcopal title used by an area bishop

The Bishop of Croydon is an episcopal title used by an area bishop of the Church of England Diocese of Southwark, in the Province of Canterbury, England. The Croydon Archdeaconry was transferred from the Canterbury Diocese to Southwark in 1984.

The bishops suffragan of Croydon have been area bishops since the Southwark area scheme was founded in 1991. The Bishop of Croydon oversees the Episcopal Area of Croydon, which is made up of the Archdeaconries of Croydon and Reigate. The Archdeaconry of Croydon comprises the Deaneries of Croydon Addington (nine parishes), Croydon Central (10 parishes), Croydon North (12 parishes), Croydon South (10 parishes) and Sutton (14 parishes). The Archdeaconry of Reigate comprises the Deaneries of Caterham (nine parishes), Godstone (14 parishes) and Reigate (24 parishes), extending as far as Gatwick Airport and Banstead.

The Episcopal area was historically in the Diocese of Canterbury, as the Archbishop of Canterbury lived at Croydon Palace and Addington Palace when he did not live at Lambeth Palace or other episcopal residences, from their medieval construction until the 19th century.

== List of the bishops ==
Bishops of Croydon
From	Until	Incumbent	Notes
1904	1924	Henry Pereira	(1845–1926)
1924	1930	no appointment	
1930	1937	Edward Woods	(1877–1953). Translated to Lichfield.
1937	1942	William Anderson	(1892–1972). Translated to Portsmouth.
1942	1947	Maurice Harland	(1896–1986). Translated to Lincoln.
1947	1956	Cuthbert Bardsley	(1907–1991). Translated to Coventry.
1957	1977	John Hughes	(1908–2001)
1977	1985	Stuart Snell	(1920–1988)
1985	2003	Wilfred Wood	(b. 1936) First area bishop from 1991.
2003	2011	Nick Baines	(b. 1957). Translated to Bradford.
2012	2022	Jonathan Clark	(b. 1961). Consecrated on 21 March 2012; retired 21 March 2022.
2022	present	Rosemarie Mallett	(b. 1959). Previously Archdeacon of Croydon.
