= Bishop to the Archbishops of Canterbury and York =

Chief of staff to the archbishops of the Church of England

The Bishop to the Archbishops of Canterbury and York is a position within the hierarchy of the Church of England. It is a non-diocesan appointment in which a bishop acts as head of staff or general assistant to the Archbishop of Canterbury and to the Archbishop of York. It was created in 2021 to replace the former role Bishop at Lambeth, who assisted only the Archbishops of Canterbury.

On 19 April 2021, it was announced that Emma Ineson, then Bishop suffragan of Penrith, was to move to Lambeth Palace, to become "Bishop to the Archbishops of Canterbury and York". She took up the appointment on 1 June 2021, and her new role replaces that of Bishop at Lambeth as episcopal assistant to Justin Welby, Archbishop of Canterbury. The new role also includes assisting Stephen Cottrell, Archbishop of York, coordinating between Lambeth and Bishopthorpe, and overseeing the Lambeth Conference 2022 programme. On 15 December 2022, it was announced that Ineson was to become the next Bishop of Kensington (an area bishop in the Diocese of London) in "spring 2023". On 2 February 2023, it was announced that David Urquhart (retired Bishop of Birmingham) would succeed Ineson for a one-year interim period starting during the week beginning 6 February 2023.

== Past and present bishops ==
From	Until	Incumbent	Notes
1980	1984	Ross Hook	Hook was the first bishop (recently) to serve as Chief of Staff to the Archbishop of Canterbury.
Bishops at Lambeth
1984	1992	Ronald Gordon	Previously Bishop of Portsmouth (1975–1984). Also became Bishop to the Forces (1985–1990).
1992	1994	John Yates	Previously Bishop of Gloucester (1975–1992).
1994	1999	Frank Sargeant	Previously Bishop of Stockport (1984–1994).
1999	2004	Richard Llewellin	Previously Bishop of Dover (1992–1999). Appointed in 1999. Became Chairman of the Anglican Society for the Welfare of Animals (ASWA).
2004	2013	vacant	
October 2013	2017	Nigel Stock	Previously Bishop of St Edmundsbury and Ipswich; retired during August 2017.
6 September 2017	30 September 2021	Tim Thornton	previously Bishop of Truro; commissioned 6 September 2017; retired on 30 September 2021.
Bishops to the Archbishops of Canterbury and York
1 June 2021	February 2023	Emma Ineson	Previously Bishop suffragan of Penrith; translated to Kensington.
February 2023	present	David Urquhart	ad interim and part-time; retired Bishop of Birmingham.
