= Jonathan Frost =

British Anglican bishop (born 1964)

The Right Reverend Jonathan Frost
- Bishop of Portsmouth
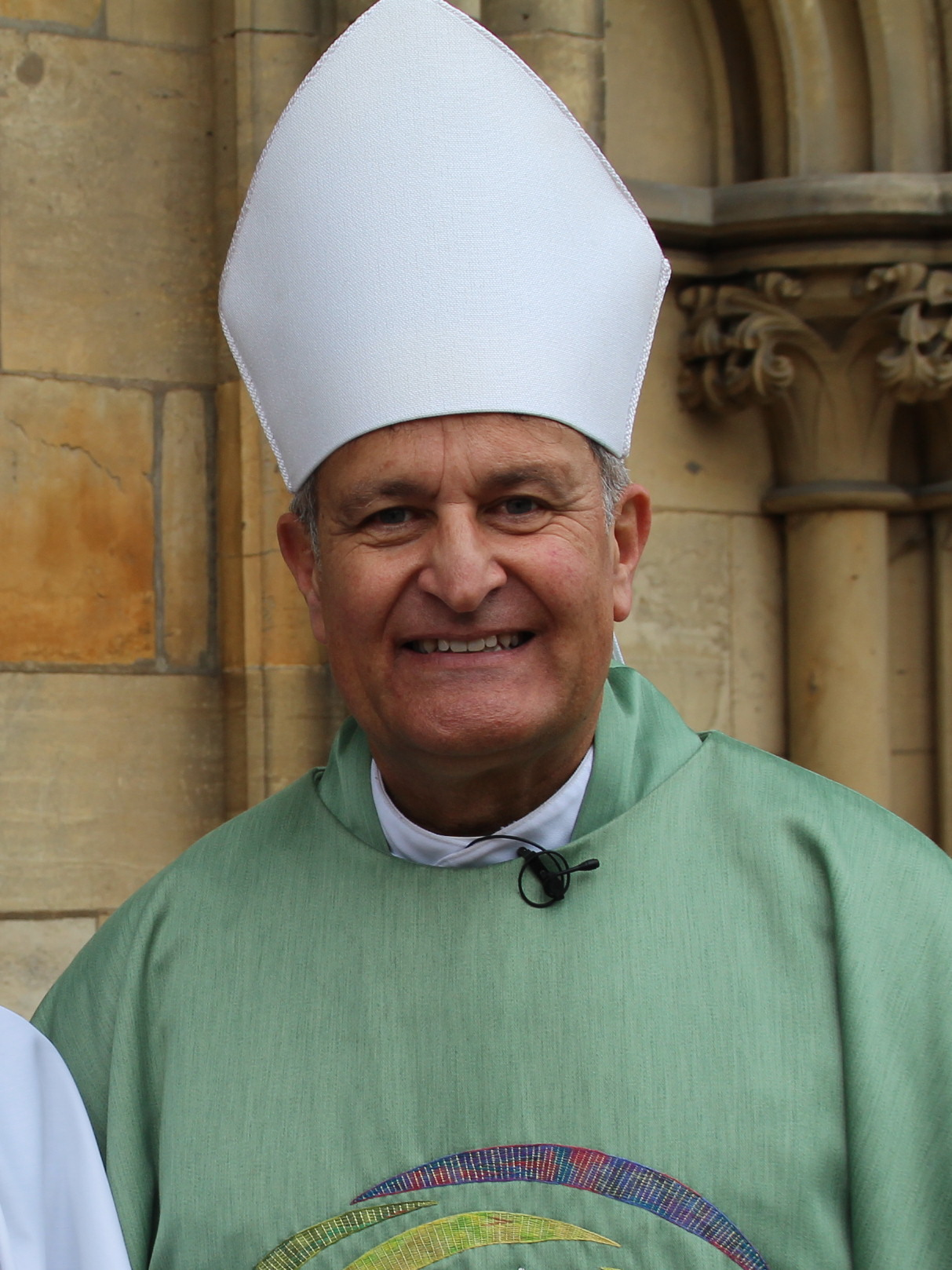
- Frost in 2021
- Church: Church of England
- Diocese: Diocese of Portsmouth
- In office: 2022–present
- Predecessor: Christopher Foster
- Previous posts: Dean of York and honorary assistant bishop (2019–2022); Bishop of Southampton (2010–2019)

Orders
- Ordination: 1993 (deacon); 1994 (priest) by Patrick Harris
- Consecration: 30 November 2010 by Rowan Williams

Personal details
- Born: 26 September 1964 (age 62)
- Denomination: Anglicanism
- Spouse: Christine Frost
- Children: 3
- Education: University of Aberdeen; Ridley Hall, Cambridge; University of Nottingham

Member of the House of Lords
- Lord Spiritual
- Bishop of Portsmouth; 23 October 2025

Jonathan Hugh Frost (born 26 September 1964) is a British Anglican bishop. He has served as the Bishop of Portsmouth since 18 January 2022. He was previously Dean of York and Bishop of Southampton, a suffragan bishop in the Church of England's Diocese of Winchester since 2010.

== Early life and education ==
Frost was born on 26 September 1964. He studied at the University of Aberdeen, graduating with a Bachelor of Divinity (BD) degree in 1988. From 1991 to 1993, he trained for ordination at Ridley Hall, Cambridge, an evangelical Anglican theological college. He continued his studies at University of Nottingham, completing a Master of Theology (MTh) in 1999.

== Ordained ministry ==
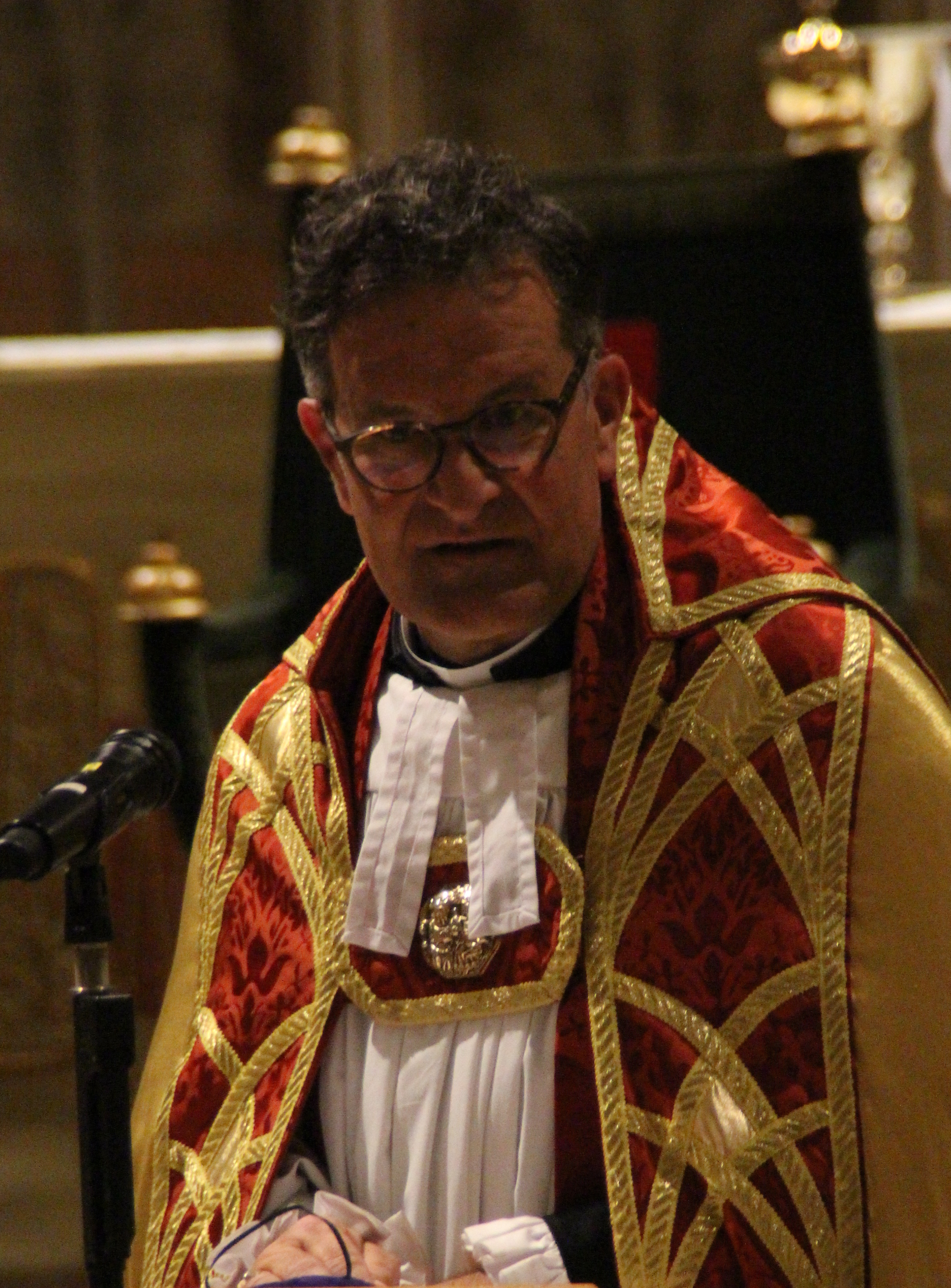
Frost as Dean of York in 2020

Frost was ordained a deacon on 27 June 1993, by Patrick Harris, Bishop of Southwell, at Southwell Minster — directly before he began his curacy at West Bridgford — and then a priest on 2 July 1994 at St John's, Beeston, again by Harris. In 1994, alongside his curacy, he became a police chaplain until he moved on from both posts in 1997 when he became Rector of Ash until 2002. Frost also served on the General Synod during the 2005–2010 session.

His most recent posts prior to the episcopate, since 2002, were as Anglican chaplain to the University of Surrey and a canon residentiary at Guildford Cathedral. In 2007, he became co-ordinating chaplain at the university and was appointed the Bishop of Guildford's Advisor for Inter-Faith Relations.

=== Episcopal ministry ===
It was announced on 30 July 2010 that Frost would become Bishop of Southampton in the Diocese of Winchester, succeeding Paul Butler (following Butler's translation to Southwell). On 30 November 2010, he was consecrated a bishop at St Paul's Cathedral by Rowan Williams, the Archbishop of Canterbury. He was welcomed to the Diocese of Winchester as Bishop of Southampton and installed as an honorary canon on 4 December 2010 at Winchester Cathedral.

On 26 November 2018, it was announced that Frost would be the next Dean of York, the head of the chapter of York Minster; his installation as Dean occurred on 2 February 2019. In March 2019, he was also licensed an honorary assistant bishop of the diocese, with a place in the diocesan House of Bishops.

On 8 October 2021, it was announced that Frost is to become the next Bishop of Portsmouth, the ordinary of the Diocese of Portsmouth, from the end of 2021. He was elected by the College of Canons on 2 December 2021 (becoming bishop-elect); he legally took the See on the confirmation of that election on 18 January 2022. He was installed as tenth Bishop of Portsmouth on 12 March 2022. On 8 September 2025, Frost was summoned to the House of Lords as one of the Lords Spiritual following the retirement of Vivienne Faull, the Bishop of Bristol.

=== Views ===
In November 2022, in response to the Church of England's Living in Love and Faith process, Frost stated "I am arguing for positive change which would enable us, as a Church, to bless, recognise and encourage signs of God's grace, presence and holiness in relationships between same-sex couples".

In November 2023, he was one of 44 Church of England bishops who signed an open letter supporting the use of the Prayers of Love and Faith (i.e. blessings for same-sex couples) and called for "Guidance being issued without delay that includes the removal of all restrictions on clergy entering same-sex civil marriages, and on bishops ordaining and licensing such clergy".

== Personal life ==
Frost is married to Christine, who is a teacher; they have three children.

As of 2018, Frost is a Benedictine oblate.

Frost is also an avid Fulham FC fan.

== Styles ==
- The Reverend Jonathan Frost (1993–2002)
- The Reverend Canon Jonathan Frost (2002–2010)
- The Right Reverend Jonathan Frost (2010–present)

Church of England titles
Preceded by Paul Butler	Bishop of Southampton; 2010–2019	Succeeded by Debbie Sellin
Preceded by Viv Faull	Dean of York; 2019–2022	Succeeded by Dominic Barrington
Preceded by Christopher Foster	Bishop of Portsmouth; 2022–present	Incumbent
