= Launcelot Fleming =

British Anglican bishop (1906–1990)

The Right Reverend Launcelot Fleming
- Bishop of Norwich
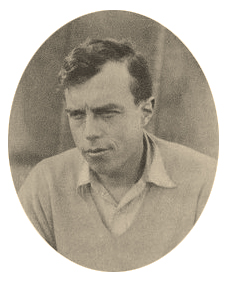
- Church: Church of England
- Diocese: Diocese of Norwich
- In office: 1960 to 1971
- Predecessor: Percy Herbert
- Successor: Maurice Wood
- Other posts: Dean of Windsor (1971–1976); Bishop of Portsmouth (1949–1960)

Orders
- Ordination: 1933 (deacon); 1934 (priest)
- Consecration: 18 October 1949 by Geoffrey Fisher

Personal details
- Born: William Launcelot Scott Fleming; 7 August 1906 Edinburgh, Scotland
- Died: 30 July 1990 (aged 83) Sherborne, Dorset, England
- Education: Rugby School
- Alma mater: Trinity Hall, Cambridge; Yale University; Westcott House, Cambridge
- Military career
- Allegiance: United Kingdom
- Branch: Royal Naval Volunteer Reserve
- Service years: 1940–1944
- Rank: Chaplain
- Unit: Royal Navy Chaplaincy Service
- Conflicts: Second World War

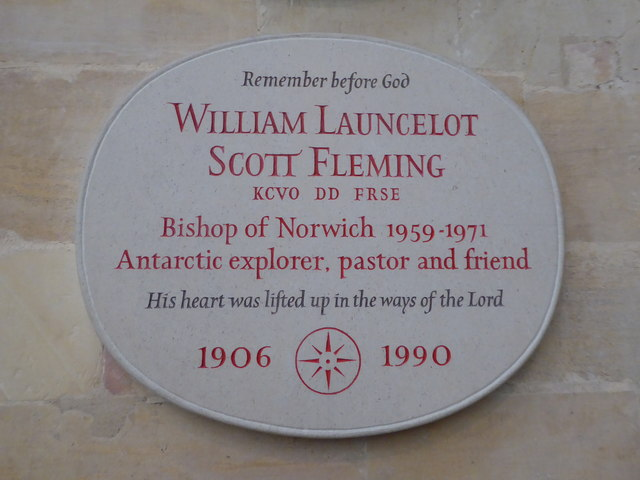
Memorial, Norwich Cathedral

William Launcelot Scott Fleming KCVO (7 August 1906 – 30 July 1990) was a Scottish Anglican bishop. He was the Bishop of Portsmouth and later the Bishop of Norwich. He was also noted as a geologist and explorer.

== Childhood ==
Fleming was born in Edinburgh on 7 August 1906, the youngest of four sons (the second of whom died at the age of five months), and fifth of five children of Robert Alexander Fleming FRSE (a surgeon in Edinburgh) and Eleanor Mary, the daughter of the Rev William Lyall Holland, rector of Cornhill-on-Tweed. The family lived at 10 Chester Street in Edinburgh's West End. He was educated at Rugby School.

== Early adult life ==
Fleming went up to Trinity Hall, Cambridge in 1925, to study the Natural Sciences Tripos. Having specialised in geology, he achieved a second class in Part I in 1927 and first class honours in Part II in 1929, thereby graduating with a Bachelor of Arts (BA). As per tradition, his BA was promoted to a Master of Arts (MA Cantab) degree in 1932. He was awarded a Commonwealth Fund Fellowship and used it to study at Yale University from 1929 to 1931: he graduated with a Master of Science (MS) degree in geology.

On his return to Britain, he studied theology and trained for Holy Orders at Westcott House, Cambridge from 1931 to 1933. He was ordained in the Church of England as a deacon in 1933 and as a priest in 1934. In 1932 he took part in the Cambridge University expedition to Vatnajokull, Iceland, led by Brian Roberts and in 1933 was chief scientist on the Oxford University expedition to Spitsbergen, led by Alexander Glen. From 1934-37 he was geologist, chaplain and photographer on the British Graham Land Expedition, and was a member of the sledging party that traversed the newly discovered King George VI Sound. He was awarded the Polar Medal in 1937.

== Later life ==
Fleming pursued an academic career, acting as an examining chaplain to a number of bishops while retaining a base at Trinity Hall, eventually becoming its dean in 1937 and an honorary fellow in 1956.

At the outbreak of the Second World War, he volunteered to become a chaplain in the Royal Naval Volunteer Reserve (RNVR). He was commissioned in the RNVR as a temporary chaplain in November 1940 with seniority from 9 July 1940. He served three years on the battleship HMS Queen Elizabeth, including when it was posted to the Mediterranean from 1941 to 1942. In 1944, he was appointed director of service ordination candidates. Later, on 4 May 1950, he made an honorary chaplain to the RNVR.

After the war, he resumed his fellowship at Trinity Hall, Cambridge, and was part-time director of the Scott Polar Research Institute from 1946 to 1949.

In 1965 he married Jane Agutter, a widow.

In 1971 he was elected a Fellow of the Royal Society of Edinburgh. His proposers were Lord Balerno, Douglas Guthrie, Norman Feather and Anthony Elliot Ritchie.

== Episcopate and parliament ==
In July 1949, Fleming's name was put forward for the position of Bishop of Portsmouth. He had never held a position in a parish. Having been selected, he was consecrated a bishop on St Luke's day (18 October) at Southwark Cathedral by Geoffrey Fisher, Archbishop of Canterbury. He did not take his place in the House of Lords for another seven years.

In 1959, he was translated to the vacant Episcopal see of Norwich, becoming the first bishop to use the ancient throne in Norwich Cathedral for 400 years. Although he became a bishop without parochial experience or any great gift for preaching, his unassuming friendliness and humility won over both clergy and laity. Portsmouth became an exceptionally well-run diocese, with more than its share of young clergy and ordinands. Norwich, with 650 churches and a shortage of clergy, presented greater problems; he tackled them resolutely and imaginatively, developing rural group ministries and again attracting good clergy. He also played a significant part in planning the University of East Anglia, which has its own university chapel. A remarkable rapport with young people led to his being made chairman of the Church of England Youth Council (1950–61). Struck by a rare spinal disorder, which seriously affected both legs, he resigned the see in 1971.

An eternally enthusiastic man, in 1960 he realised a lifetime's ambition to ride on the footplate of a locomotive, and in 1965, at the comparatively advanced age of 58, he married Jane Agutter, the widow of Anthony Agutter and daughter of Henry Machen. It was a happy marriage which lasted for twenty-five years but produced no children.

In 1967, unusually for a bishop, Fleming piloted a bill (subsequently the Antarctic Treaty Act 1967) through the House of Lords. Well informed on environmental and ecological issues (he was a pre-war glaciologist of repute), he constantly urged responsible stewardship of the world (his maiden speech in the House of Lords was about cruelty to whales), and the need for international co-operation. He became vice-chairman (1969–71) of the parliamentary group for world government, and a member of the government Royal Commission on Environmental Pollution (1970–73). At Windsor, he consolidated the reputation of St George's House. His influence on church policy would have been greater but for synodical government – off-the-cuff debate was not his forte.

== Later career ==
On resigning his See, Fleming was appointed the Queen's domestic chaplain and Dean of Windsor, in which capacity he officiated at the funerals of Prince William of Gloucester and the former Edward VIII (Duke of Windsor). In 1976 he was created a Knight Commander of the Royal Victorian Order and awarded an honorary doctorate by the University of East Anglia for his work with young people. He retired to Dorset and died in Sherborne on 30 July 1990. He was cremated and his ashes were interred in the churchyard of All Saints' Church in Poyntington in Dorset.

== Publications ==
- Foreword to William of Gloucester: Pioneer Prince, edited by Giles St. Aubyn (London: 1977)
- Fleming, Launcelot; Walton, Kevin; et al. (1983). Portrait of Antarctica. Philip's. ISBN 978-0540010752.

Church of England titles
Preceded by William Louis Anderson	Bishop of Portsmouth; 1949–1960	Succeeded by John Henry Lawrence Phillips
Preceded by Percy Mark Herbert	Bishop of Norwich; 1960–1971	Succeeded by Maurice Arthur Ponsonby Wood
Preceded by Robert Wylmer Woods	Dean of Windsor; 1971–1976	Succeeded by Michael Mann
