= James Drummond Anderson (1886–1968) =

Financial Commissioner of the Punjab

Sir James Drummond Anderson KCIE CIE
- Anderson in 1961
- Born: 1886
- Died: 1968 (aged 81–82)
- Occupation: Financial Commissioner of the Punjab from 1941 to 1946

Sir James Drummond Anderson (1886–1968) served as Financial Commissioner of the Punjab from 1941 to 1946.

== Biography ==
Born in 1886, Anderson was the eldest son of James Drummond Anderson, D.Litt., University Lecturer in Bengali at Cambridge. His younger brother William Louis Anderson was an Anglican bishop. He was assigned to the Defence Department of the Government of India in the late 1930s and made a companion of the Order of the Indian Empire in 1939. Subsequently, he was appointed Financial Commissioner, Revenue, and Secretary to Government, Revenue Department, Punjab, and made a Knight Commander of the Indian Empire in the 1944 Birthday Honours. Anderson was photographed in 1948 and 1961, by Walter Stoneman and Walter Bird respectively, for the National Photographic Record of the National Portrait Gallery.
