= Leslie Owen =

British bishop (1886–1947)

The Right Reverend Leslie Owen
- Bishop of Lincoln
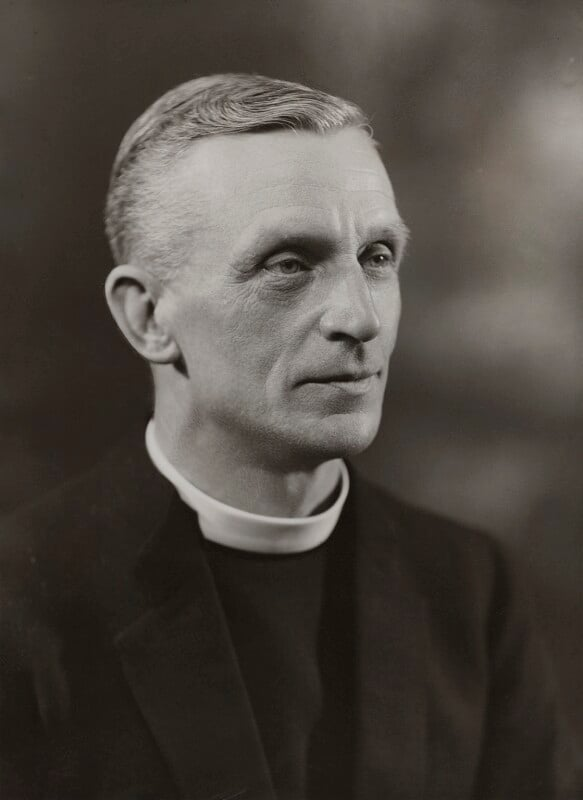
- Owen in 1936
- Church: Church of England
- Diocese: Diocese of Lincoln
- In office: 1946–1947
- Predecessor: Aylmer Skelton
- Successor: Maurice Harland
- Other posts: Archdeacon of Auckland (1936–1939); Bishop of Jarrow (1939–1944); Bishop of Maidstone (1944–1946)

Orders
- Ordination: 1912 (priest)
- Consecration: 1939

Personal details
- Born: 1886
- Died: 3 March 1947 (aged 60–61)
- Denomination: Anglican
- Education: St John's College, Cambridge

Leslie Owen (1886–3 March 1947) was an Anglican bishop.

Owen was educated at Merchant Taylors' School, Northwood. He studied at St John's College, Cambridge and Ely Theological College.

He was ordained in 1912 and was a curate at Ashford (1914–19). He was interviewed by the Chaplain-General in November 1916 for a commission as a Temporary Chaplain to the Forces. It was noted that, unusually, he could ride, speak French and German and preach extempore. He was posted to Malta, "the nurse of the Mediterranean", where he was given a "very satisfactory report". He was demobilised in 1919. When peace returned he became a lecturer at Bishop's College, Cheshunt and then Warden of the Scholar Cancellarii, Lincoln. Appointed Archdeacon of Auckland in 1936, he was ordained to the episcopate as Bishop of Jarrow three years later. While at Jarrow, he conducted the wedding of his secretary to Michael Ramsay, future Archbishop of Canterbury.

Owen was a highly regarded scholar and was considered for the vacant diocesan bishoprics at Southwell (1941), Blackburn and Lincoln (1942) but he was not appointed. Instead, Archbishop Temple arranged for his translation to another suffragan bishopric, Maidstone, in 1943, with special responsibility for supporting Chaplains and for making arrangements for post-War ordination candidates who had fought in the War. The following year, Owen was preaching in the Guards Chapel in London when it was hit by a flying bomb. He was physically unhurt but badly shaken by the experience. Nevertheless, he was considered for the diocesan sees of Salisbury and Lincoln in 1946 and was appointed to Lincoln. Although he had been assured by his doctors of his fitness for the post, he fell ill and died in March 1947, aged 60. "He did not make public appearances, or write books, or attract attention to himself. It required a flying bomb to make him for a moment a head-line figure".

Church of England titles
Preceded by James Geoffrey Gordon	Bishop of Jarrow; 1939–1944	Succeeded by David Colin Dunlop
Preceded by Inaugural appointment	Bishop of Maidstone; 1944–1946	Succeeded by Not replaced for 10 years
Preceded by Alymer Skelton	Bishop of Lincoln; 1946–1947	Succeeded by Maurice Harland
