= James Drummond Anderson (1852–1920) =

British linguist and writer (1852–1920)

James Drummond Anderson (1852 – 24 November 1920) was a member of the Indian Civil Service from 1873 until 1900, and later a lecturer in Bengali at the University of Cambridge. He was a leading authority on Bengali and several other languages.

== Life and career ==
James Drummond Anderson was born in Calcutta in British India. His father James Anderson was a doctor in the service of the East India Company and his mother was Ellen Mary Garstin. He learned to speak Bengali fluently. He was sent to London at age 7. Educated at Cheltenham and Rugby, he passed the prestigious Indian Civil Service (ICS) examination in 1873, obtaining the highest marks among all the candidates for his English essay.

His early service years were spent in Bengal. He was then transferred to Assam, where he was posted in districts, acted as the Inspector-General of Police, and an Assistant Secretary to the Chief Commissioner. In 1894 he returned to Bengal and served first as Collector and then as Commissioner of Chittagong. He returned to England in 1898 and retired from the ICS in 1900.

In 1907, Anderson was appointed teacher of Bengali at the University of Cambridge, a post he held for the rest of his life. The university awarded him the honorary degree of M.A. in 1909, and the highest degree of Litt.D.

His wife was Frances Louisa Cordue. They had seven children. Their eldest son Sir James Drummond Anderson (1886–1968) was also a member of the Indian Civil Service. Another son William Louis Anderson was the Anglican Bishop of Portsmouth and Salisbury.

== Works ==
In an obituary in The Journal of the Royal Asiatic Society of Great Britain and Ireland, Irish linguist and fellow member of the ICS Sir George Abraham Grierson notes J. D. Anderson's many achievements in the field of language studies.

He did a series of important works on the customs and languages of the Tibeto-Burman inhabitants of Assam. He published A Short List of Words of the Hill Tippera Language (1885), which was "an excellent comparative vocabulary of that form of speech and of Lushei and Bodo." He published A Collection of Kachári Folk-Tales and Rhymes (1895), Kachari language being a Sino-Tibetan language of the Boro-Garo subgroup. The following year he published A Short Vocabulary of the Aka Language. Aka language, also known as Hruso language, is spoken by a small number of people in today's Arunachal Pradesh, India.

Most of Anderson's subsequent work focused on the Bengali language. In 1897, he published Chittagong Proverbs, a "collection of proverbs and sayings in the Chittagong dialect of Bengali."

While teaching in Cambridge, he published a book on Indian ethnology, The Peoples of India (1913). A few months before his death, he published A Manual of the Bengali Language (1920), the inaugural volume in the series Cambridge Guides to Modern Languages. Previous writers had added their own additions and corrections to the works of their predecessors. "But Anderson broke entirely new ground. He took the language as he found it in modern literature, and, without regard to theories of what Bengali ought to be, he described it as it is."

He made many contributions to the Royal Asiatic Society's journal on "difficult points of Bengali grammar, idiom, and prosody." He regularly corresponded with the literary circle in Bengal.

Anderson translated four stories by famous novelist Bankim Chandra Chatterjee, Indira and other stories (1918). The book had two illustrations by famous artist Nandalal Bose.

In an article entitled "A New Bengali Writer" in the Times Literary Supplement dated 11 July 1918, he introduced Sarat Chandra Chattopadhyay to a western readership. This was prophetic—Chattopadhyay went on to become one of India's most popular and famous writers.

Besides Indian languages, J. D. Anderson was scholar of the French language. He had studied at the Paris University, and had even lectured in French at the Institute.

== Publications ==
- A Short List of Words of the Hill Tippera Language (1885)
- A Collection of Kachári Folk-Tales and Rhymes (1895)
- A Short Vocabulary of the Aka Language (1896)
- Chittagong Proverbs (1897)
- The Peoples of India (1913)
- Indira and other stories (1918)
- A Manual of the Bengali Language (1920)
