= Westcott House, Cambridge =

Anglican theological college in the United Kingdom

Coordinates: 52.208395°N 0.122663°E

Westcott House
- Theological college
- Cambridge Theological Federation
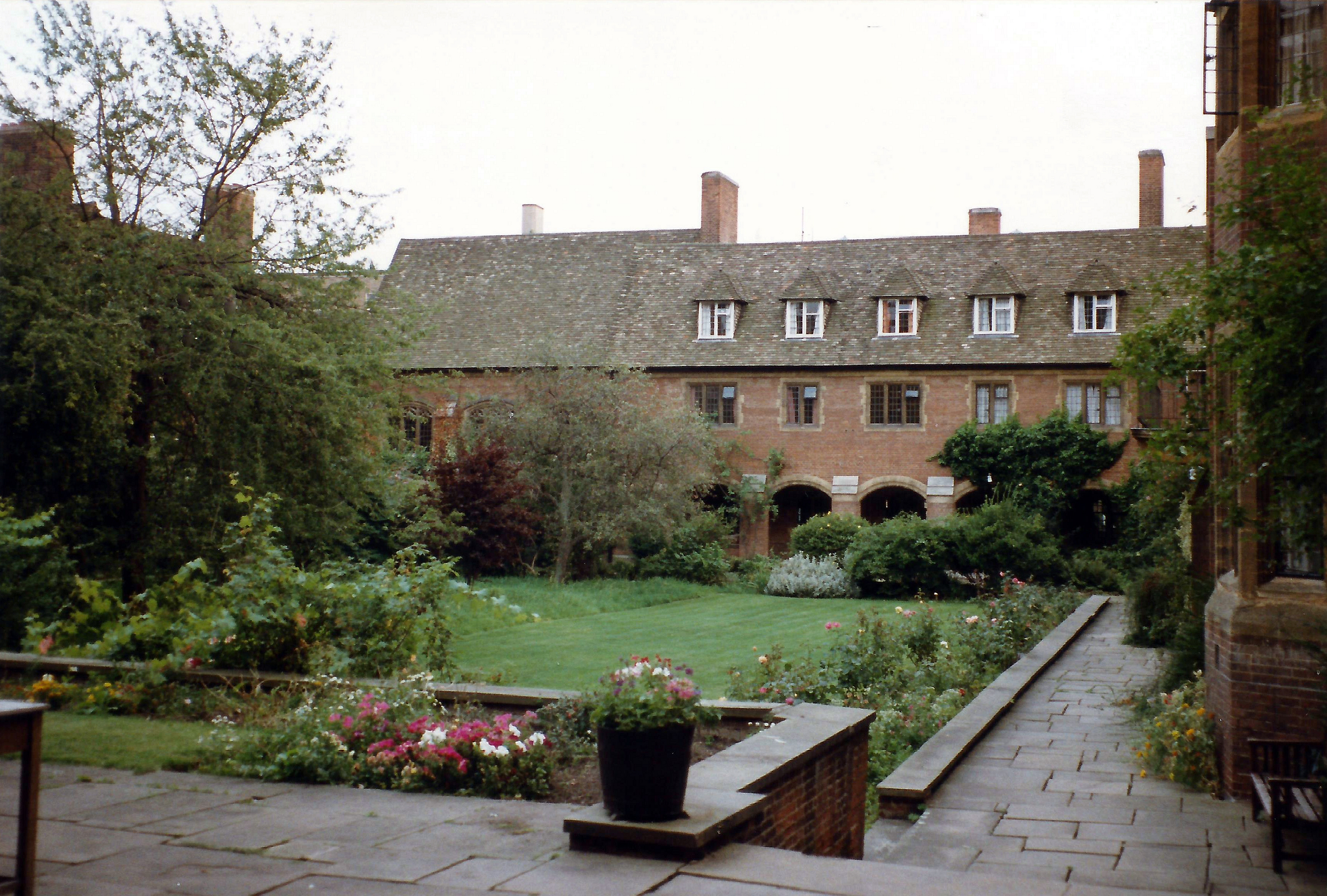
- Westcott House old court
- Location: Jesus Lane
- Established: 1881
- Named after: Brooke Foss Westcott
- Former names: Cambridge Clergy Training School
- Principal: Helen Dawes
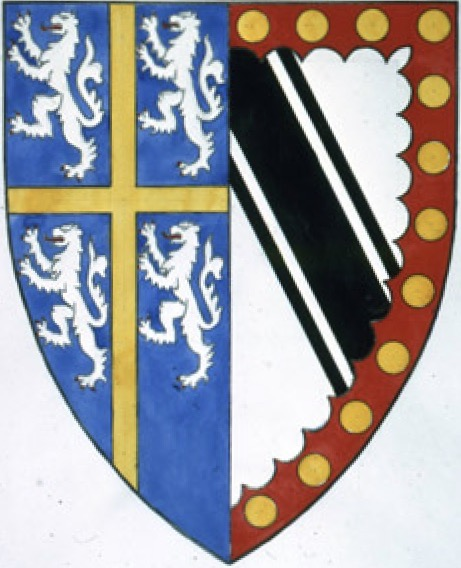
- Website: www.westcott.cam.ac.uk

Westcott House is an Anglican theological college based on Jesus Lane in the centre of the university city of Cambridge in the United Kingdom. Its main activity is training people for ordained ministry in the Church of England and other Anglican churches. Westcott House is a founding member of the Cambridge Theological Federation. The college is considered by many to be Liberal Catholic in its tradition, but it accepts ordinands from a range of traditions in the Church of England.

== History ==
Westcott House began its life in 1881 as the Cambridge Clergy Training School. Brooke Foss Westcott, the then Regius Professor of Divinity at the University of Cambridge, was its first president. He later became the Bishop of Durham. A pioneering and respected New Testament scholar himself, the school was the product of Westcott's own passionate concern to raise the standard of clergy education and to equip clergy to meet the challenges of parish ministry. Westcott was also exercised by the way in which the Church of England was increasingly dominated by parties and factions. Westcott himself eschewed any party affiliation. The college has often been associated with a Liberal Catholic ethos, although its essential charism embraces the breadth of the Church of England and the wider church: 'As a scholar, educator, priest and prophet, Westcott's legacy to the Church of England challenges sectarianism, ignorance, complacency and empty faith. This is the spirit which Westcott House seeks to honour today, drawing students from all backgrounds to prepare them for ministry in this historic centre of Christian learning'.

In response to the Faith in the City report, published in 1985, the college has retained a firm commitment to develop expertise and capacity in the field of urban ministry and mission. Through its partnership with the Diocese of Manchester, the college has pioneered patterns of context-based learning and innovative approaches to contextual theology for over twenty years. These approaches have been widely imitated and developed by other theological education institutions. The college has also developed a programme for continuing ministerial development through the Westcott Foundation.

The college provides training pathways in conjunction with the University of Cambridge and the Common Awards (validated by Durham University), as well as opportunities for independent study for undergraduate and postgraduate degrees through the wider Cambridge Theological Federation and Anglia Ruskin University. Westcott House describes itself as "the home of a diverse, inclusive and international community of people who share a vision of ministry to all society". Drawing on the inspiration of B. F. Westcott and others, its ethos is expressed in a rule of life which was adopted in 2014.

== Notable people ==
=== List of principals ===
The head of Westcott House is known as the principal. All the principals of the Clergy Training School and of Westcott House have been Anglican priests.

- 1887–1901: Frederic Chase
- 1901–1911: Henry Knight
- 1911–1916: Charles Lambert

1916–1919: Closed during World War I

- 1919–1943: Bertram Cunningham
- 1943–1947: William Greer
- 1948–1961: Kenneth Carey
- 1962–1972: Peter Walker
- 1972–1981: Mark Santer
- 1981–1993: Rupert Hoare
- 1993–2006: Michael Roberts
- 2006–2015: Martin Seeley
- 2015–2019: Chris Chivers
- 2019–2020 (acting): Paul Dominiak, Vice-Principal
- 2020–2021 (interim): Tim Stevens
- 2021–present: Helen Dawes

=== Staff ===
Besides the aforementioned principals, notable staff have included:

- Charles Freer Andrews, vice-principal; then missionary, educator and social reformer in India
- Michael Beasley, chaplain, tutor and vice-principal; former bishop suffragan of Hertford and current Bishop of Bath and Wells.
- Spencer Carpenter, vice-principal; later Dean of Exeter
- Gregory Collins, chaplain and acting vice-principal; current Canon Chancellor of Chichester Cathedral
- John Collins, vice-principal: later Canon of St Paul's Cathedral
- Don Cupitt, vice-principal; later Dean of Emmanuel College, Cambridge
- Charles Garrad, vice-principal; then missionary and Bible translator in Burma
- John Habgood, vice-principal; later Bishop of Durham and Archbishop of York
- John Harmer, vice-principal: later Bishop of Adelaide and Bishop of Rochester
- Hugh Montefiore, vice-principal; later Bishop of Birmingham
- Jeremy Morris, tutor, director of studies and vice-principal; former Master of Trinity Hall, Cambridge
- Robert Runcie, chaplain, tutor and vice-principal; later principal of Ripon College Cuddesdon, Bishop of St Albans and Archbishop of Canterbury
- Mary Tanner, tutor; later European President of the World Council of Churches
- Angela Tilby, tutor and vice-principal; current Canon of Christ Church, Oxford
- Alan Webster, chaplain and vice-principal; later Dean of St Paul's
- Harry Williams, chaplain and tutor: later Dean of Trinity College, Cambridge, theologian and monk of the Community of the Resurrection
- Rowan Williams, chaplain, tutor and director of studies; later Lady Margaret Professor of Divinity at Oxford and canon of Christ Church Bishop of Monmouth, Archbishop of Wales, Archbishop of Canterbury and Master of Magdalene
- Edward Wynn, vice-principal; later Bishop of Ely

=== Alumni ===
Notable alumni of Westcott House and of the Clergy Training School include:

- Robert Atwell, bishop of Exeter
- Paul Badham, Professor emeritus of Theology and Religious Studies at the University of Wales, Lampeter
- Simon Bailey, writer and priest
- Christina Beardsley, priest and advocate for transgender inclusion in the Church of England
- Alister McGrath, Professor in Science and Religion and writer
- Andrew Ballard, retired archdeacon of Manchester
- David Bartleet, Bishop suffragan of Tonbridge
- Dewi Bridges, Bishop of Swansea and Brecon
- Gareth Bennett, academic renowned for criticising the then-Archbishop
- Fergus Butler-Gallie, vicar and writer
- Chiu Ban It, Bishop of Singapore
- Stephen Conway, current bishop of Lincoln, former bishop of Ely
- Christopher Cunliffe, current archdeacon of Derby
- Henry de Candole, Bishop suffragan of Knaresborough and liturgist
- Griff Dines, Provost of St Mary's Cathedral, Glasgow
- Maurice O'Connor Drury, left Westcott after one year
- Peter Eaton, current bishop of the Episcopal Diocese of South-East Florida
- David Edwards, Provost of Southwark
- Peter Eliot, Archdeacon of Worcester
- Ralph Emmerson, Bishop suffragan of Knaresborough
- Michael (Fisher) SSF, Bishop suffragan of St Germans
- Launcelot Fleming, Bishop of Norwich
- Frank Ford, Archdeacon of the East Riding
- David Galliford, Bishop suffragan of Bolton
- Herbert Gwyer, Bishop of George
- Stuart Hallam, a current Naval chaplain
- Barry Hollowell, Bishop of Calgary
- Forbes Horan, Bishop suffragan of Tewkesbury
- Anthony Hoskyns-Abrahall, Bishop suffragan of Lancaster
- Noel Hudson, Bishop of Labuan and Sarawak
- Andrew Hunter, former MP for Basingstoke
- Robert Keable, novelist and missionary
- John Lewis, Archdeacon of Hereford
- Barry Morgan, former archbishop of Wales and Bishop of Llandaff
- Edward Patey, Dean of Liverpool
- Guy Pentreath, chaplain and headmaster
- John Polkinghorne, theoretical physicist and theologian
- William Rees, Archdeacon of St Asaph
- David Reindorp, vicar
- John Richardson, Archdeacon of Derby
- John Robinson, Bishop suffragan of Woolwich
- Patrick Rodger, Bishop of Oxford
- John Edmondson, member of the House of Lords
- Paul Shinji Sasaki, Bishop of Tokyo
- Allan Shaw, Dean of Ely
- Shimun XXI or XXIII Eshai, Patriarch of the Assyrian Church of the East
- Percival Smith, Archdeacon of Lynn
- Mervyn Stockwood, former Bishop of Southwark
- Carol Stone, vicar
- Barry Till, academic and educator
- Graham Usher, current Bishop of Norwich
- Cherry Vann, current Bishop of Monmouth and Archbishop of Wales
- Benjamin Vaughan, former Bishop of Swansea and Brecon
- Graham Ward, current Regius Professor of Divinity at Oxford University
- Richard Watson, former Bishop of Burnley
- David Wilbourne, former assistant bishop of Llandaff
- Trevor Willmott, former bishop of Dover
- Kenneth Woollcombe, former Bishop of Oxford

== Gallery ==
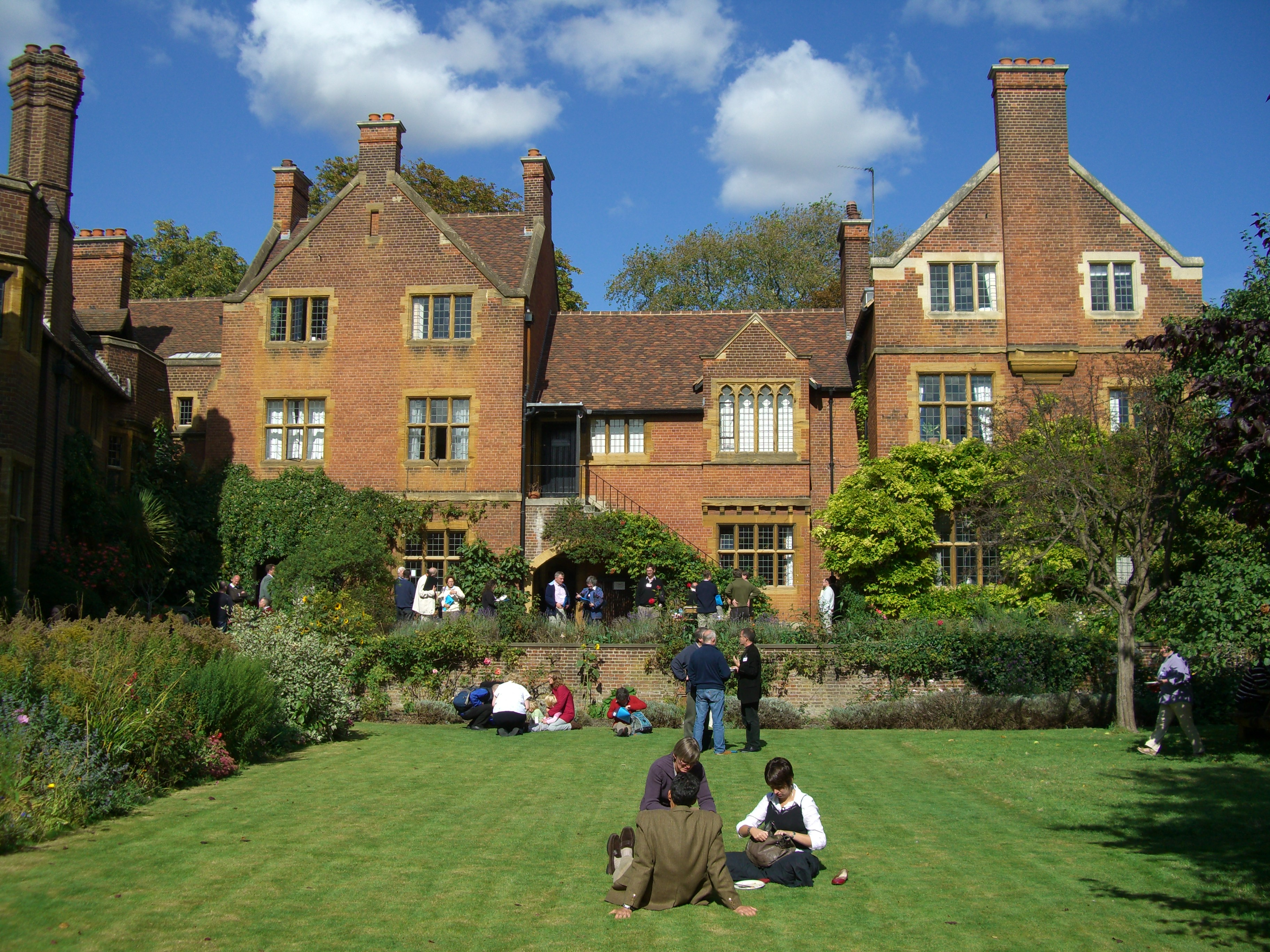
Old Court Lawn

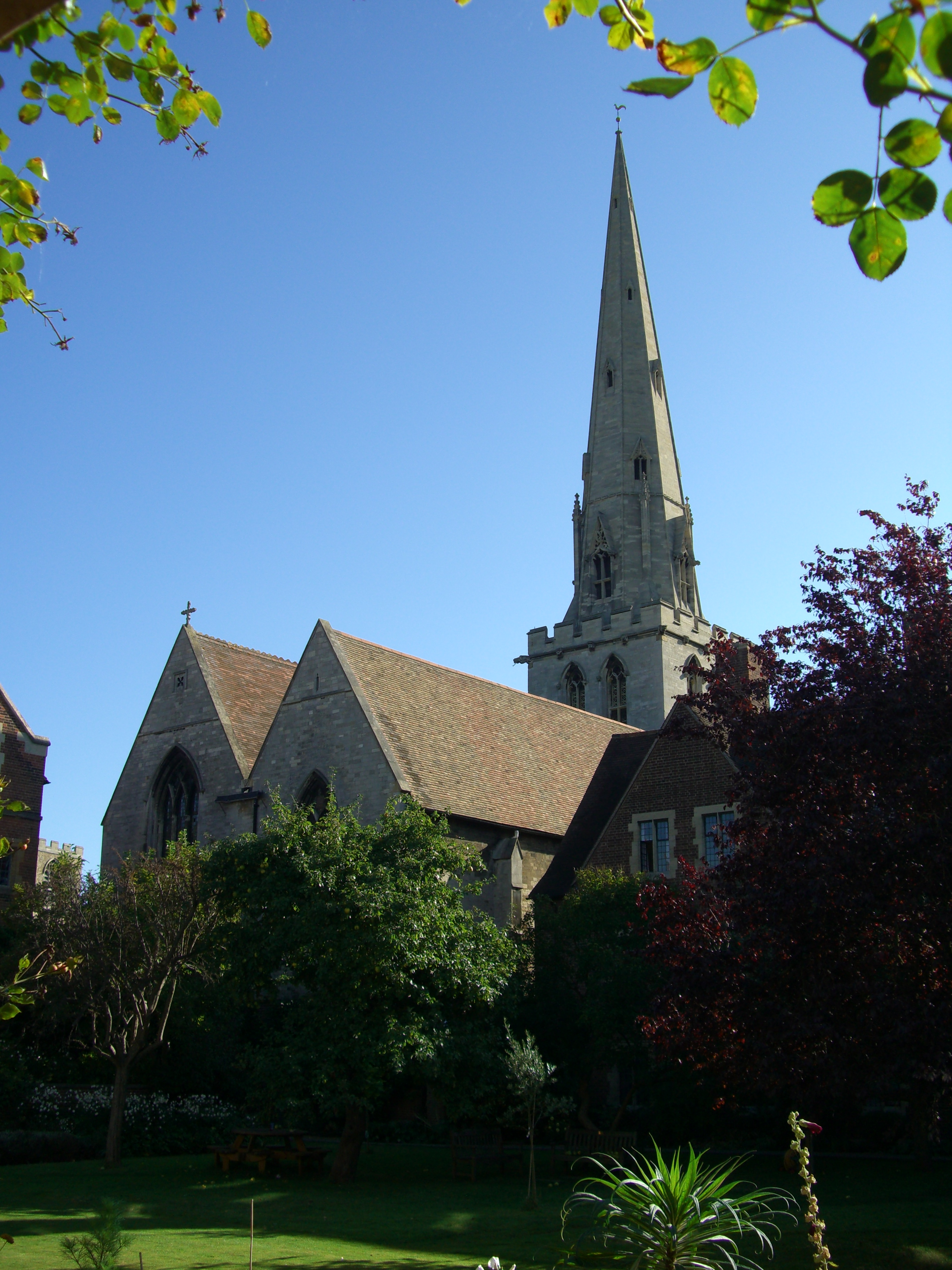
All Saints Church, Jesus Lane, Cambridge
