= Myanmar Standard Bible =

- Full name: Myanmar Standard Bible
- Other names: ျမန္မာ့စံမီသမၼာက်မ္း
- Language: Myanmar
- OT published: 2023
- NT published: 2014
- Textual basis: OT: Biblia Hebraica Stuttgartensia. NT: Nestle-Aland's Novum Testamentum Graece 27th edition and United Bible Society Greek New Testament, 4th corrected edition.
- Copyright: Copyright 2013, 2017 by Global Bible Initiative
- Genesis 1:1–3^{၁} အစအဦး၌ ဘုရားသခင္သည္ ေကာင္းကင္ႏွင့္ေျမႀကီးကုိ ဖန္ဆင္းေတာ္မူ၏။ ^{၂} ေျမႀကီးသည္ အသြင္သဏၭာန္မရွိ၊ လဟာသက္သက္ျဖစ္၏။ နက္႐ႈင္းရာအရပ္၏မ်က္ႏွာျပင္ေပၚ ေမွာင္မုိက္ဖုံးလႊမ္း၍ ဘုရားသခင္၏ဝိညာၫ္ေတာ္သည္ ေရမ်က္ႏွာျပင္ေပၚမွာ ရစ္ဝဲလ်က္ေနေတာ္မူ၏။ ^{၃} ဘုရားသခင္က "အလင္းျဖစ္ေစ"ဟု မိန္႔ေတာ္မူရာ အလင္းျဖစ္ေလ၏။ John 3:16 ဘုရားသခင္သည္ မိမိ၏တစ္ပါးတည္းေသာသားေတာ္ကို စြန္႔ေတာ္မူသည့္တိုင္ေအာင္ ေလာကီသားတို႔ကိုခ်စ္ေတာ္မူ၏။ ဤသည္ကား သားေတာ္ကိုယုံၾကည္ေသာသူတိုင္း မပ်က္စီးဘဲ ထာဝရအသက္ကိုရရွိေစရန္ျဖစ္၏။

The Myanmar Standard Bible (MSB) is a translation of the Bible in Myanmar language produced by Global Bible Initiative (formerly Asia Bible Society) using translation tools developed by GBI. The project was started in January 2007.

The translation of the New Testament was completed in December 2013, and the dedication ceremony was celebrated at Judson Church in Yangon, Myanmar, on 25 January 2014, with more than 200 attendees from leaders and pastors from various Christian churches and organizations. The translation was completed in April 2023. The audiobook version was completed in June 2024. It is available on the YouVersion app and Myanmar Standard Bible app for Android on the Google Play Store, both in Zawgyi font and Unicode formats.

== Printed editions ==
- Myanmar Standard Bible /Judson Bible Parallel New Testament 2013, 2015. Myanmar Standard Bible New Testament special edition 2016.

== See also ==
- Bible translations into Burmese
