= Zawgyi =

Zawgyi may refer to:

- Zawgyi (alchemist), Burmese shaman or magician, skilled in Tantric lore
- Zawgyi (writer), Burmese poet and author
- Zawgyi dance, a dance in Burma
- Zawgyi font, a non-Unicode typeface for the Burmese script
- Zawgyi River, a river in Myanmar
