= Earl Collins =

Earl Collins may refer to:

- Earl Gregory Collins (born 1960), Anglican priest and former Benedictine abbot
- Earl Collins (politician) (1895–1958), American politician
