= Barry Till =

English priest and academic (1923–2013)

Barry Dorn Till (1 June 1923 – 12 June 2013) was an Anglican priest, author and academic.

He was born on 1 June 1923, educated at Harrow and served in the Coldstream Guards from 1942 to 1946. He studied at Jesus College, Cambridge, where he read history and theology and in 1949 was awarded the Cambridge University Lightfoot Scholarship in ecclesiastical history with special commendation. Thereafter, he studied at Westcott House, Cambridge, where his tutors included Alan Webster and Harry Williams, and contemporaries included Hugh Montefiore, all of whom remained great friends: he was ordained in 1951. After a curacy in Bury, Lancashire he returned to his old college as Fellow, Chaplain and Tutor. In 1960 he became Dean of Hong Kong, a post he held until 1964. He was Principal of Morley College, London from 1965 to 1986 and Adviser (1973–1986), then Director (1986–1992) of the Baring Foundation.
