= Chris Chivers =

The Reverend Canon Chris Chivers
- Principal of Westcott House, Cambridge
- Church: Church of England
- In office: 1 August 2015 – 20 September 2019
- Predecessor: Martin Seeley
- Successor: Helen Dawes
- Other posts: Area Dean of West Barnet (2014–2015); Vicar of John Keble Church, Mill Hill (2010–2015); Canon Chancellor of Blackburn Cathedral (2005–2010)

Orders
- Ordination: 1997 (deacon) by Richard Chartres; 1998 (priest) by Brian Masters

Personal details
- Born: Christopher Mark Chivers; 16 July 1967 (age 59)
- Spouse: Mary Chivers
- Children: Three
- Education: Bristol Cathedral School; Magdalen College, Oxford

Christopher Mark "Chris" Chivers (born 16 July 1967) is an Anglican priest, composer, and author. From 2015 until 2019, he was the Principal of Westcott House, Cambridge, an Anglican theological college in the Liberal Catholic tradition.

== Early life ==
Chivers was born on 16 July 1967. He was educated at Bristol Cathedral School, an all-boys private school in Bristol which provides a choir to Bristol Cathedral. He then studied at Magdalen College, Oxford.

Following graduation, Chivers held musical teaching posts at New College School, Oxford, Cheltenham Ladies' College and King's College School, Cambridge.

== Career ==
=== Ordained ministry ===
After studying at Westcott House, Cambridge, Chivers was ordained a deacon on 28 June 1997 at St Paul's Cathedral by Richard Chartres, Bishop of London and a priest on 28 June 1998 at St Pancras New Church by Brian Masters, area Bishop of Edmonton. He served his curacy in the Parish of Friern Barnet. During his time there he was named one of the top ten preachers of the year in The Times 1999 Preacher of the Year competition.

In 1999 he went to Cape Town as Canon Precentor of St. George's Cathedral, Cape Town. While there he witnessed the work of the Truth and Reconciliation Commission and spoke to the worshippers at Friday Prayers in a local mosque.

In November 2001 he was appointed Precentor of Westminster Abbey in London and Chaplain of Westminster Abbey Choir School. He participated in the funeral of Queen Elizabeth The Queen Mother. In 2005 he became Canon Chancellor of Blackburn Cathedral. While there, he was one of the first to teach the Awareness Course.

In 2010 he became Vicar of John Keble Church, Mill Hill, in the Diocese of London and in 2012 a priest vicar of Westminster Abbey.

On 1 August 2015 Chivers became Principal of Westcott House, Cambridge. On Tuesday 31 January 2017, ordinands at Westcott held a service using excerpts from the Sisters of Perpetual Indulgence's Bible in Polari, an event he described as "hugely regrettable".

His resignation with immediate effect for undisclosed reasons was announced on 20 September 2019.

=== As author ===
Chivers has written about his experiences in South Africa and made contributions to other collections. As a journalist he has written for the Cape Times, The Times, The Independent, The Guardian, Church Times, Church of England Newspaper and The Tablet.

=== Musical work ===
His choral works have been sung at (amongst others) King's College, Cambridge, Westminster Abbey and Gloucester Cathedral; and include: Our Blessed Lady's Lullaby (1988), Ecce Puer (1994), Mayenziwe Magnificat (2000) and Diptych (2006).

=== Broadcasting ===
Chivers has presented The Daily Service for BBC Radio 4, interviewed Desmond Tutu and was part of the team broadcasting the Inauguration of President Barack Obama in Washington DC.

=== Other ===
- In 2008 his work in reaching out to the Muslim faith was recognized when he was the named the North West's Man of the Year.
- In 2009 he became a Companion of the Melanesian Brotherhood, the largest Anglican religious order in the world.
- He was Chair of the Trustees of Us. (formerly the USPG) until 2018; and Faith Advisor to the Charity Commission.

== Personal life ==
In 1998, Chivers married Mary Rumble (née Philpott). Together they have three sons: Dominic, Gregory and Jonathan.

== Styles ==
- The Reverend Chris Chivers (1997–1999)
- The Reverend Canon Chris Chivers (1999–present)
