= Helen Dawes =

The Reverend Helen Dawes
- Principal of Westcott House, Cambridge
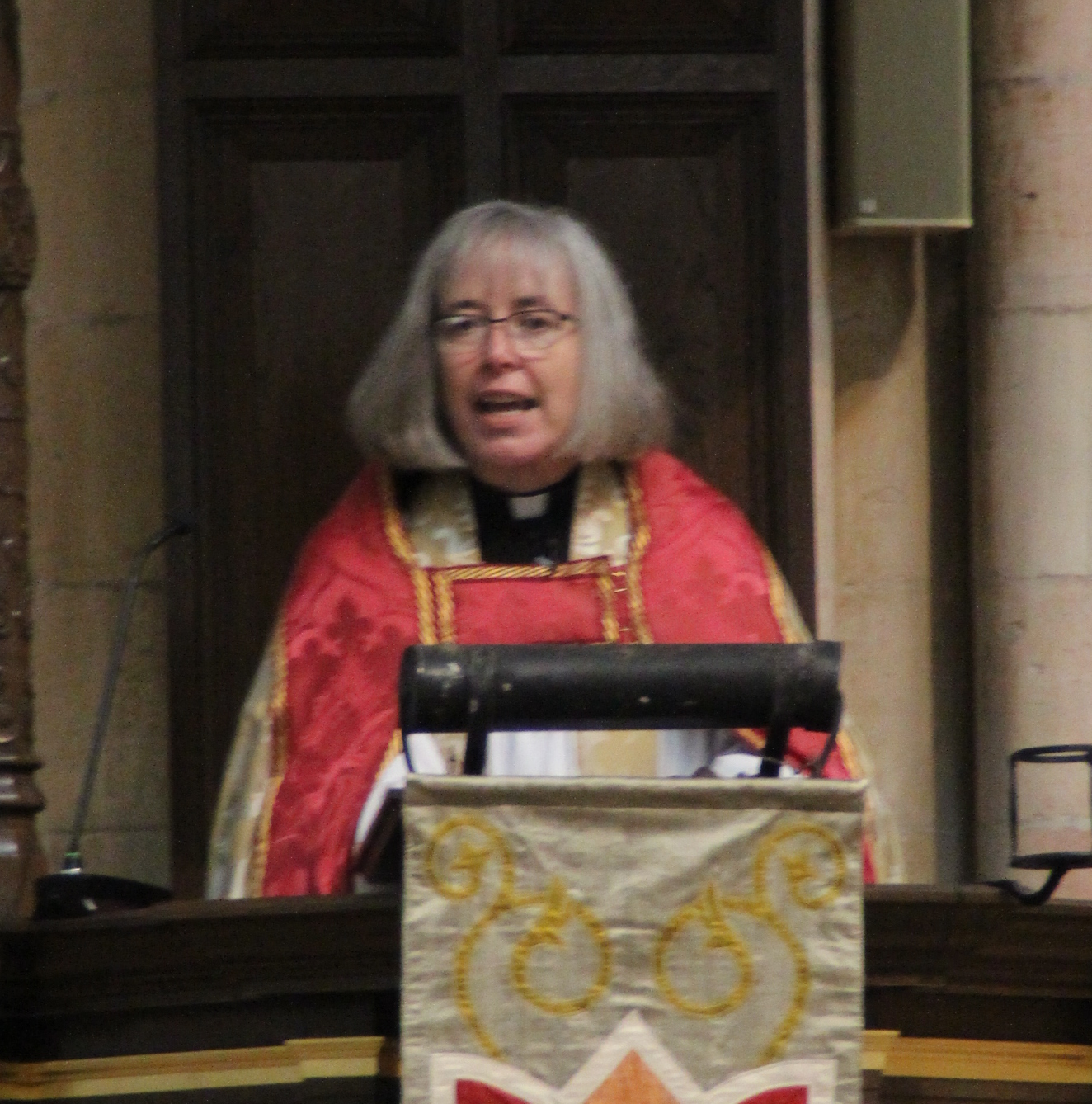
- Dawes in 2024
- Church: Church of England
- In office: 2021 to present
- Predecessor: Chris Chivers

Orders
- Ordination: 2002 (deacon); 2003 (priest)

Personal details
- Born: 1974 (age 51–52)
- Denomination: Anglicanism
- Education: Trinity College, Cambridge; Westcott House, Cambridge; Anglia Ruskin University; King's College London

Helen Elizabeth Dawes is a British academic administrator. Since 2021, she has been Principal of Westcott House, Cambridge. Before returning to Westcott House where she had trained for ordination, she served in parish ministry in the Dioceses of Ely, St Albans and Salisbury, and on the staff of the Archbishop of Canterbury.

== Early life and education ==
Dawes was born on 5 January 1974. She was educated at South Wilts Grammar School, then an all-girls grammar school in Salisbury, England. She studied Natural Sciences at Trinity College, Cambridge, graduating with a Bachelor of Arts (BA) degree in 1996: as per tradition, her BA was promoted to a Master of Arts (MA Cantab) degree. Then, between 1996 and 1999, she worked in strategic and regulatory consulting.

In 1999, Dawes matriculated into Westcott House, Cambridge, to study theology and train for holy orders. She left in 2002 to be ordained in the Church of England. She continued her studies and graduated from Anglia Ruskin University with a Master of Arts (MA) degree. She undertook a part-time Doctor of Philosophy (PhD) degree in theology and economics at King's College London. She graduated in 2018, and her doctoral thesis was titled "An examination of the contextualisation of the human person as a potential contribution to conversation between theology and political economy".

== Ordained ministry ==
Dawes was ordained in the Church of England as a deacon in 2002 and as a priest in 2003. From 2002 to 2005, she served her curacy at St Andrew's Church, Chesterton in the Diocese of Ely. In 2005, she was appointed priest-in-charge of the United Benefice of Sandon, Wallington and Rushden with Clothall in the Diocese of St Albans. In 2009, she joined the staff of the Archbishop of Canterbury, and was based at Lambeth Palace. First, from 2009 to 2013, she was the deputy secretary for public affairs. Secondly, from 2013 to 2015, she was social and public affairs adviser to Archbishop Justin Welby.

In 2015, Dawes returned to parish ministry, having been appointed Team Rector of Shaftesbury in the Diocese of Salisbury. She was additionally Dean of Women's Ministry for the diocese from 2016. In November 2020, it was announced that she would be the next principal of Westcott House, Cambridge. She took up the post in February 2021.

== Personal life ==
In 1997, she married Jonathan Dawes. Together they have one son and two daughters.

Academic offices
Preceded by Chris Chivers; Tim Stevens (acting)	Principal of Westcott House, Cambridge; 2021 to present	Incumbent
