= Michael Roberts (priest) =

Michael Graham Vernon Roberts (born 1943) is a retired British Church of England priest and academic.

His early career was spent as a parish priest and a university chaplain. From 1970 to 1974, he was Chaplain of Clare College, Cambridge. He taught at The Queens Theological College in Birmingham during the 80s.From 1993 to 2006, he was Principal of Westcott House, Cambridge, an Anglican theological college. In 2006, he was appointed an honorary canon of Ely Cathedral.
