= Bible translations into Burmese =

Language-specific translations of the Bible

There are many different translations of the Bible into Burmese (also known as the Myanmar language).

== Judson (BJB) ==
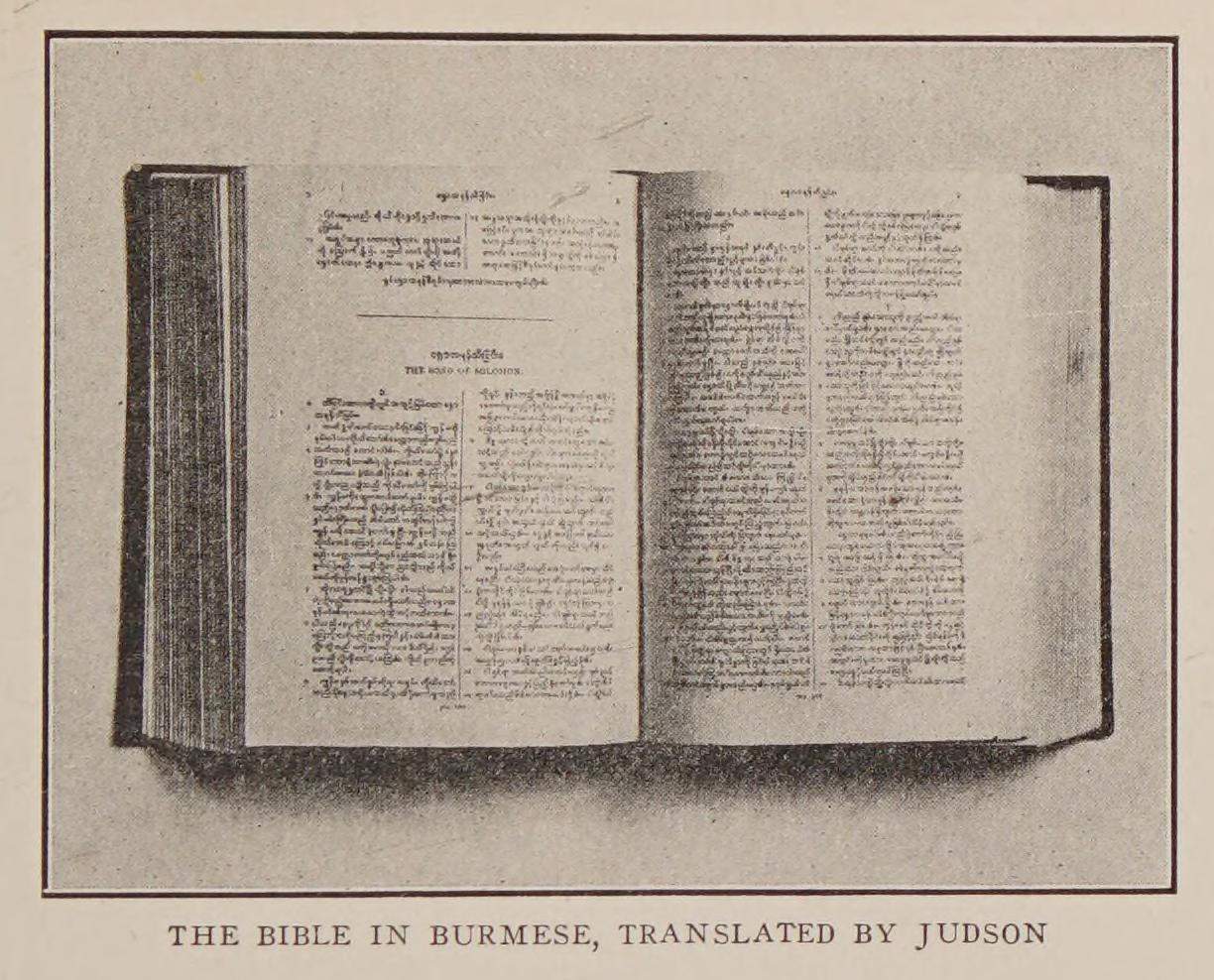
The Bible in Burmese translated by Judson

Adoniram Judson made the first complete translation of the Bible from the original languages into Burmese, completed by 31 January 1834. After this, he continued to revise it. He completed a revision of the Old Testament on 26 September 1835, a revision of the New Testament on 22 March 1837, and a revision of the entire Bible, published in quarto format, on 24 October 1840.

Judson was a Baptist when he performed his translation work, and his Bible translation is considered by some to be associated with the denomination's beliefs.

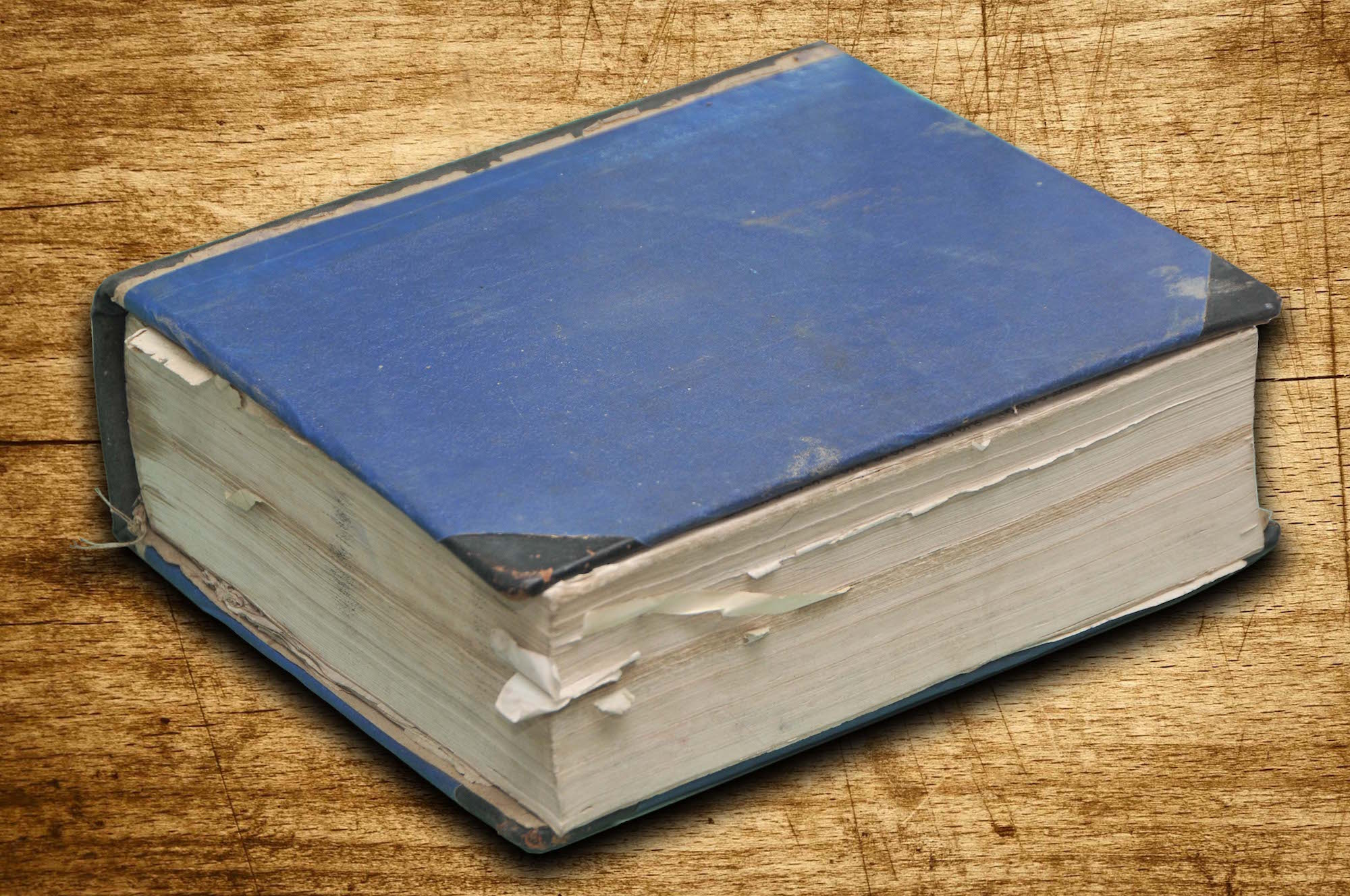
Judson Bible (1840) 2nd edition.

The Judson Bible is available in the YouVersion app, the Bible Society of Myanmar app, and on multiple websites, including Bible.com and the Bible Society of Myanmar website.

== Tun Nyein ==
A translation by U Tun Nyein, a government translator, of the New Testament from the English Revised Version was published by Hanthawaddy Press in 1903. This was later revised and published by the British and Foreign Bible Society in 1909.

== Garrad ==
Another complete translation from Hebrew and Greek was started in 1923. It was published by the British and Foreign Bible Society and translated by Charles Edward Garrad, William Sherratt and George Kya Bin. It is generally believed to have been completed in 1926 and published in 1927. It is claimed to be mainly used within the Anglican denomination. Garrad was a distinguished scholar. He won many prizes while an undergraduate at Jesus College, Cambridge. He later became a fellow of Clare College, Cambridge (1900-1906). He was also Vice-Principal of Westcott House, Clergy Training College, Cambridge (1902–06). In 1906 he left England to become a missionary in Burma. Due to ill health he returned to England in 1932. He became the vicar of Barrow Gurney in Somerset where he continued to revise his translation. He died in 1958 in Crewkerne in Somerset.

The New Testament might be a revision of the Tun Nyein translation.

Garrad continued to document corrections to this translation after its publication. Andrew Garrad, his grandson, and Anne Carter, his daughter, initiated the incorporation of these into the translation. This work was completed in 2012 and defined as a new edition of the translation. Garrad's translation is available in the Bible Society of Myanmar app.

Anne Carter has written an account of her family's time in Burma in her book "Bewtiched by Burma - A unique insight into Burma's complex past". It tells a vivid and often humorous tale of the challenges of life in Burma faced by early Anglican missionaries. Garrad's other daughter, Elizabeth Anderson, who was born in Burma, published a novel "Under Running Laughter. Burma - The Hidden Heart" which is based on the family's experiences in Burma. Liz Anderson also described her own experience as a doctor working with her husband Tim Anderson in post Pol Pot Cambodia in "Red Lights and Lizards - A Cambodian Adventure"

== McGuire ==
Revision of the Judson translation by John McGuire and others began around 1904. It was published by American Baptist Mission Press in 1933.

== Common Language (BCL) ==
Due to changes in the Burmese language since the Judson translation, work on a new one began in 1966. The translation was done by U Sein Pe and others. The complete Bible was published in 2005.

This translation was translated from the Good News Bible, which is an English translation, with the intention of using modern Burmese.

The Common Language Bible is available in the YouVersion app, the Bible Society of Myanmar app, Bible.com, and the Bible Society of Myanmar website.

== Eagle Edition ==
A revision of the Judson translation was published in 2006 by unknown authors. Apparently the key change is the way the word "eagle" is translated. However, this translation has been criticised for showing signs of being done hastily and without sufficient grounds for the changes.

== Easy-to-Read Version ==
World Bible Translation Center, part of Bible League International, has produced a translation of the New Testament called "Easy-to-Read" version. This translation is said to be translated from the original languages to common, basic Burmese. Its translation method is equivalent to the English version with the same name. As the name implies, the translation process emphasised and prioritised convenient readability.

== Myanmar Standard Bible (MSB) ==
Myanmar Standard Bible (New Testament) was published by the Global Bible Initiative in January 2014. The translation for the Old Testament is in progress and the book of Psalms, Proverbs and Ecclesiastes have been released in electronic versions such as YouVersion app and Myanmar Standard Bible app for Android on Google Play store, in Zawgyi font and Unicode formats.

== New World Translation ==
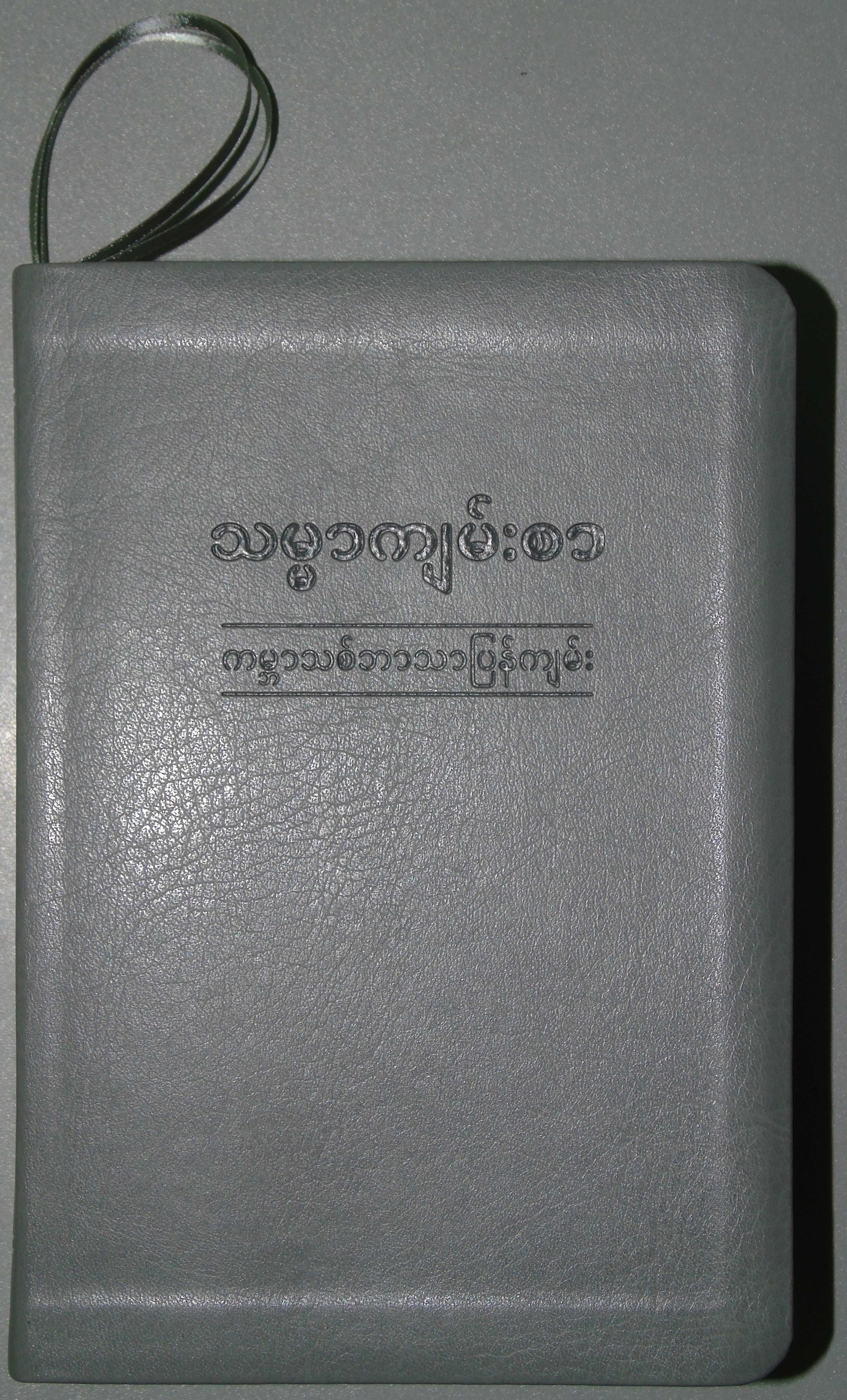
New World Translation of the Holy Scriptures in Burmese

The New World Translation of the Holy Scriptures was released in Myanmar language by the Watch Tower Society in 2017. Unlike other Bible translations it is translated from English.

== Comparison ==
Translation	John 3:16
English (KJV)	For God so loved the world, that he gave his only begotten Son, that whosoever believeth in him shall not perish, but have everlasting life.
Judson	ဘုရားသခင်၏သားတော်ကို ယုံကြည်သောသူအပေါင်းတို့သည်၊ ပျက်စီးခြင်းသို့မရောက်၊ ထာဝရအသက်ကို ရစေခြင်းငှါ၊ ဘုရားသခင်သည် မိမိ၌ တပါးတည်းသော သားတော်ကို စွန့်တော်မူသည်တိုင်အောင် လောကီသားကို ချစ်တော်မူ၏။
Garrad	ဘုရားသခင်သည် သားတော်ကိုယုံကြည်သူတိုင်းမပျက်စီးဘဲ ထာဝရအသက်ရစေခြင်းငှာ၊ ဧကပုတ္တသားတော်ကိုအပ်ပေးသည့်တိုင်အောင် ဤလောကသားတို့အား မေတ္တာသက်တော်မူ၏။
Common Language	ဘုရားသခင်သည်လောကသားတို့ကိုလွန်စွာ ချစ်တော်မူသဖြင့် သားတော်အားယုံကြည်သူ အပေါင်းတို့သည်ပျက်စီးဆုံးပါးခြင်းမရှိ ဘဲ ထာဝရအသက်ကိုရစေခြင်းငှာ မိမိ ၏တစ်ပါးတည်းသောသားတော်ကိုစွန့်တော် မူ၏။-
Easy-to-Read	ဘုရားသခင်သည် လောကီသားတို့ကို အလွန်ချစ်တော်မူ၍ သူ၌ တစ်ပါးတည်းသောသားတော်ကို ပေးတော်မူ၏။ ဘုရားသခင်သည် သားတော်ကို ပေးတော်မူသည် ဖြစ်သောကြောင့် သားတော်ကို ယုံကြည်သောသူအပေါင်းတို့သည် ပျက်စီးခြင်းသို့ မရောက်၊ ထာဝရအသက်ကိုရစေခြင်းငှါ ဖြစ်၏။-
Myanmar Standard Bible	ဘုရားသခင်သည် မိမိ၏တစ်ပါးတည်းသောသားတော်ကို စွန့်တော်မူသည့်တိုင်အောင် လောကီသားတို့ကိုချစ်တော်မူ၏။ ဤသည်ကား သားတော်ကိုယုံကြည်သောသူတိုင်း မပျက်စီးဘဲ ထာဝရအသက်ကိုရရှိစေရန်ဖြစ်၏။-
New World Translation	ဘုရားသခင်က လူ့လောကကို အလွန်ချစ်တယ်။ ဒါကြောင့် မိမိရဲ့သားကို ယုံကြည်သက်ဝင်သူတိုင်း ဖျက်ဆီးမခံရဘဲ ထာဝရအသက်ရနိုင်ဖို့ အဲဒီတစ်ဦးတည်းသော သားကိုတောင် ပေးအပ်ခဲ့တယ်။
