= Stuart Hallam =

The Revd. Stuart Hallam is an Anglican Royal Navy chaplain, notable for being one of the handful of commando-trained chaplains.

Hallam was born and brought up in Mansfield, Nottinghamshire and graduated from St Martin's College, Lancaster in 1992 after reading for a Social Policy degree. After some time working as a youth worker in London, he was called to the priesthood and went up to Cambridge to read theology through Wolfson College. He trained for the ministry at Westcott House, Cambridge, and was ordained in 1999, despite the fact that his college principal recommended his ordination with "every confidence and a temor of trepidation".

He was curate of St. Mary's Church, Battersea between 1999 and 2001, after which he joined the Royal Navy as a chaplain. After a brief period at Britannia Royal Naval College, Dartmouth, where he was awarded the prize for being the "Cadet who made the most outstanding contribution to Initial Sea Training" whilst on board HMS Campbletown in the Gulf, he undertook commando training at Commando Training Centre Royal Marines, Lympstone, where his progress through the commando course and his struggles to overcome injury were featured on the television programme Chaplain RN.

He was awarded the 'Green Beret' in July 2003.

On 23 July 2017 the Executive Archdeacon of the Canadian Anglican Diocese of New Westminster announced that St. Philip's Dunbar had made a recommendation to Archbishop Melissa Skelton to appoint Hallam as the 10th Rector of the Vancouver, BC Canada parish.

Reverend Hallam relocated to Canada and was inducted on 22 May 2018. On 10 January 2021 Hallam announced that he was resigning as rector after just over 33 months in the position and planned to return home with his family to the United Kingdom. Hallam's last Sunday worship service at St Philip's Dunbar was on 28 February 2021
