= John Keble Church, Mill Hill =

Coordinates: 51.6148°N 0.2618°W

John Keble, Mill Hill
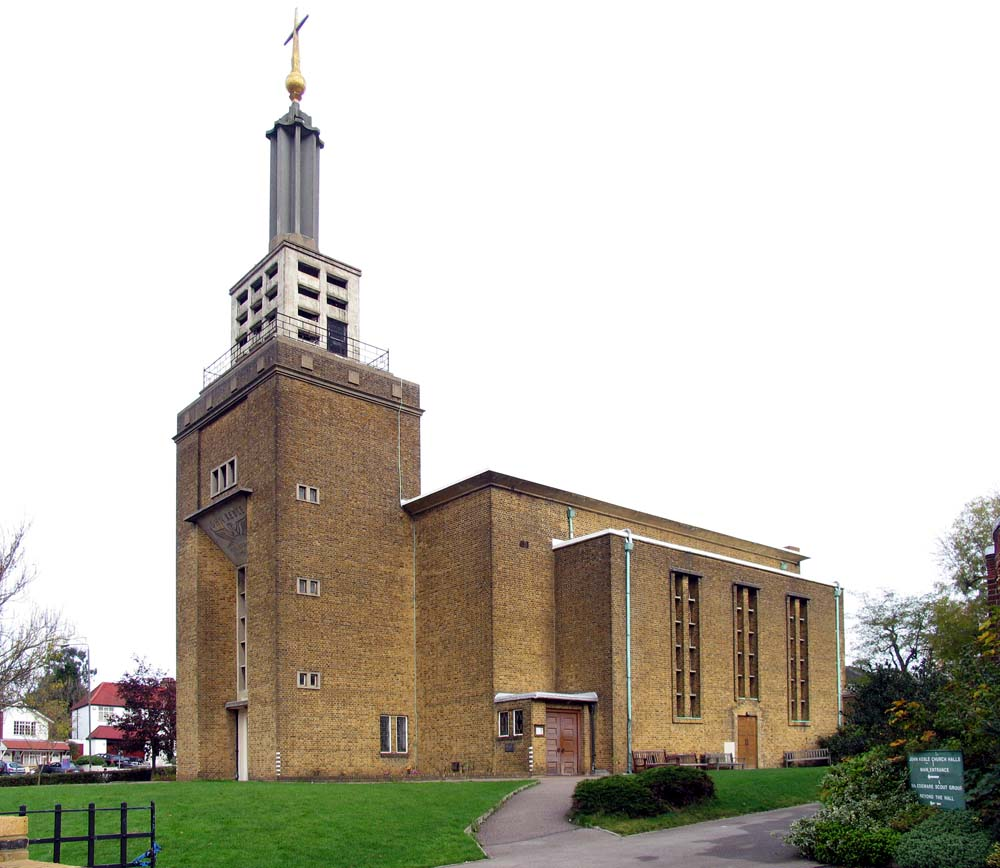
- John Keble Church
- John Keble, Mill Hill
- Location: Mill Hill, London, HA8 9NT
- Country: England
- Denomination: Church of England
- Churchmanship: Anglo-Catholic / Central

History
- Status: Active

Architecture
- Functional status: Parish church

Administration
- Diocese: Diocese of London
- Archdeaconry: Archdeaconry of Hampstead
- Deanery: West Barnet
- Parish: John Keble Church, Mill Hill

Clergy
- Vicar: Revd Andy Arnell

The John Keble Church is a Church of England parish church in Mill Hill, London Borough of Barnet. The church was completed in 1936 and is of a modernist design. It is the only church dedicated to John Keble, one of the leaders of the Oxford Movement. It is a Grade II listed building.

== History ==
The church was designed by D. F. Martin-Smith. It was consecrated in 1936.

On 18 May 1989, the church was designated a grade II listed building.

== Notable clergy ==
- Edward Holland, curate from 1969 to 1972, later Bishop of Colchester
- Robert Atwell, curate from 1978 to 1981, later Bishop of Exeter
- Martin Poll, curate from 1987 to 1990, later Archdeacon for the Royal Navy

=== List of vicars ===
- 1932–1941: Oswin Gibbs-Smith; first vicar, later Dean of Winchester
- 1941–1957: Edward Motley
- 1958–1963: Rennie Simpson; later Archdeacon of Macclesfield
- 1963–1970: John Ginever
- 1971–1979: John Dennis; later Bishop of St Edmundsbury and Ipswich
- 1981–2009: Oliver Osmond
- 2010–2015: Chris Chivers; later Principal of Westcott House
- 2016–2022: Simon Rowbory
- 2023–present: Andy Arnell

== Gallery ==
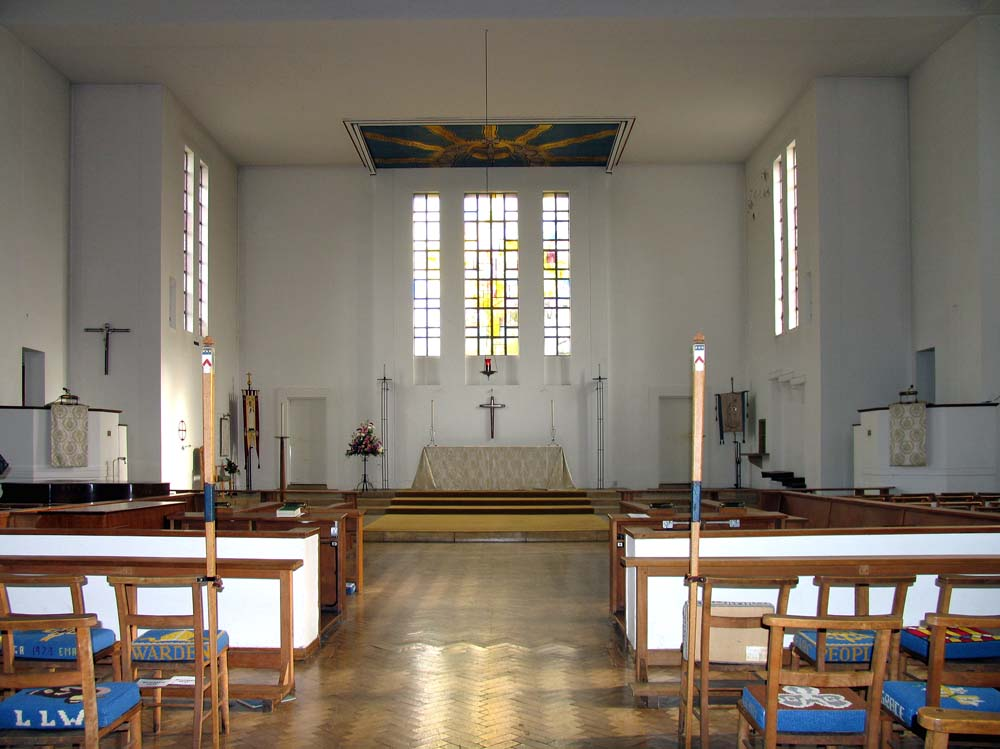
Interior, looking east

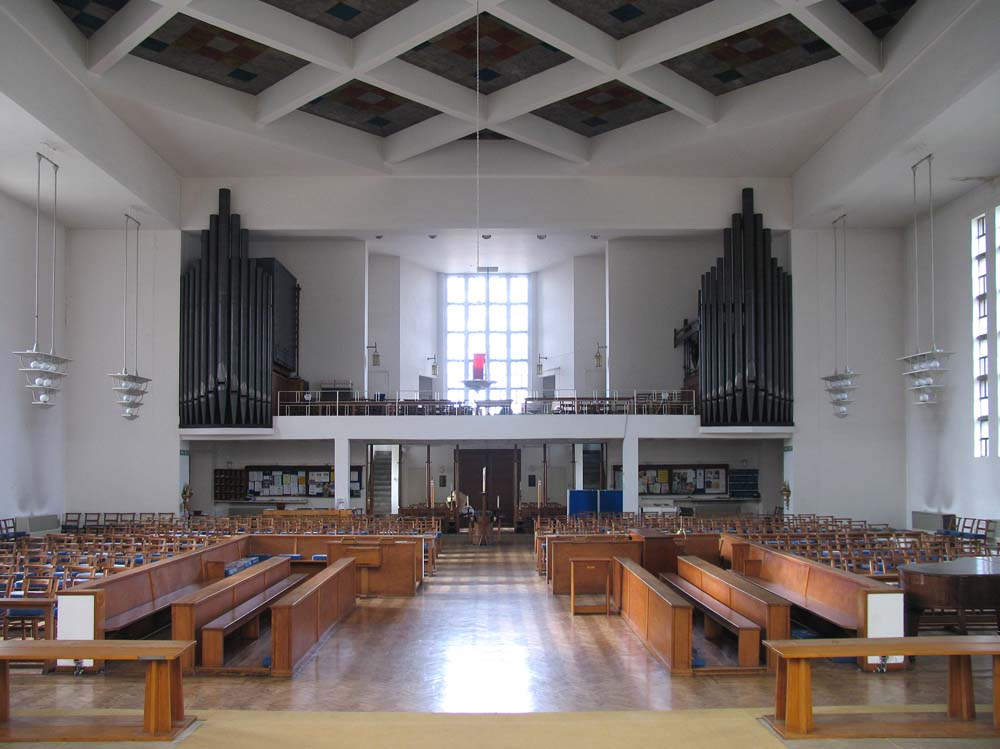
Interior, looking west

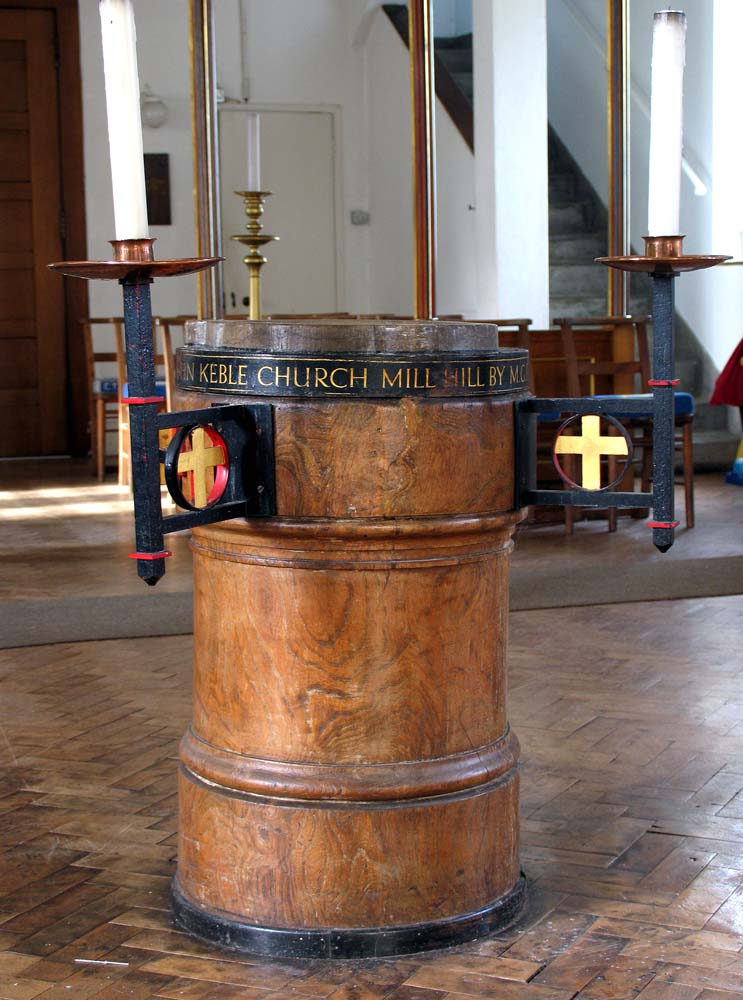
The font

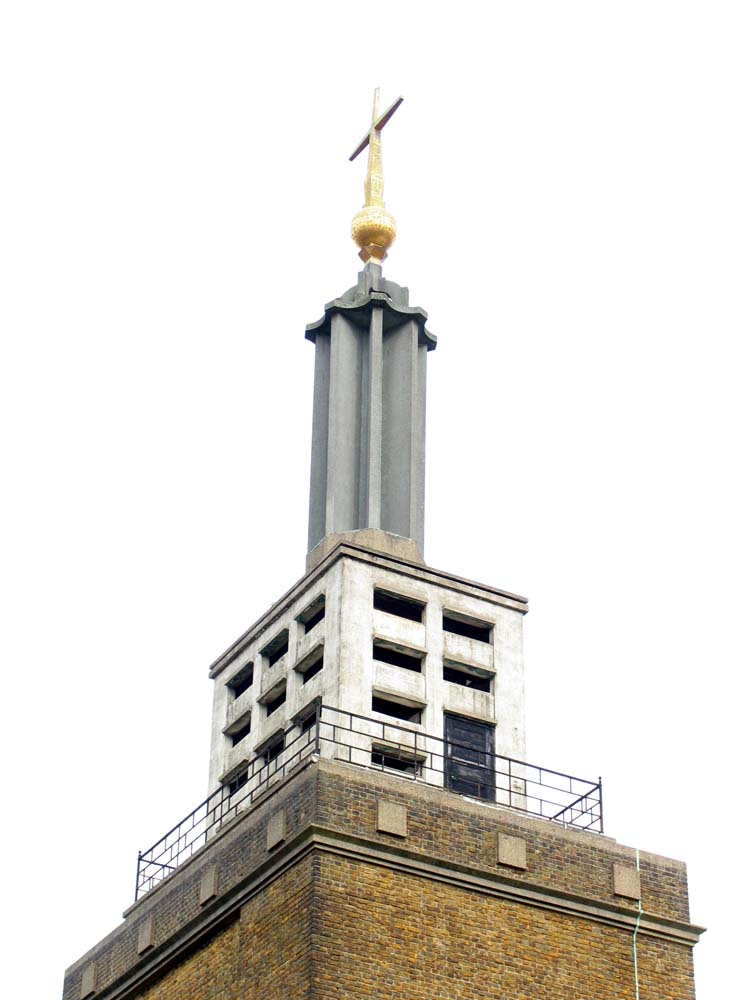
The tower
