= Joseph Francis Gilbert =

British artist (1792–1855)

- Born: 1792
- Died: 25 September 1855 (aged 62–63); Southwark, London, England

Joseph Francis Gilbert (1792 – 25 September 1855) was a British landscape painter and draughtsman.

== Biography ==
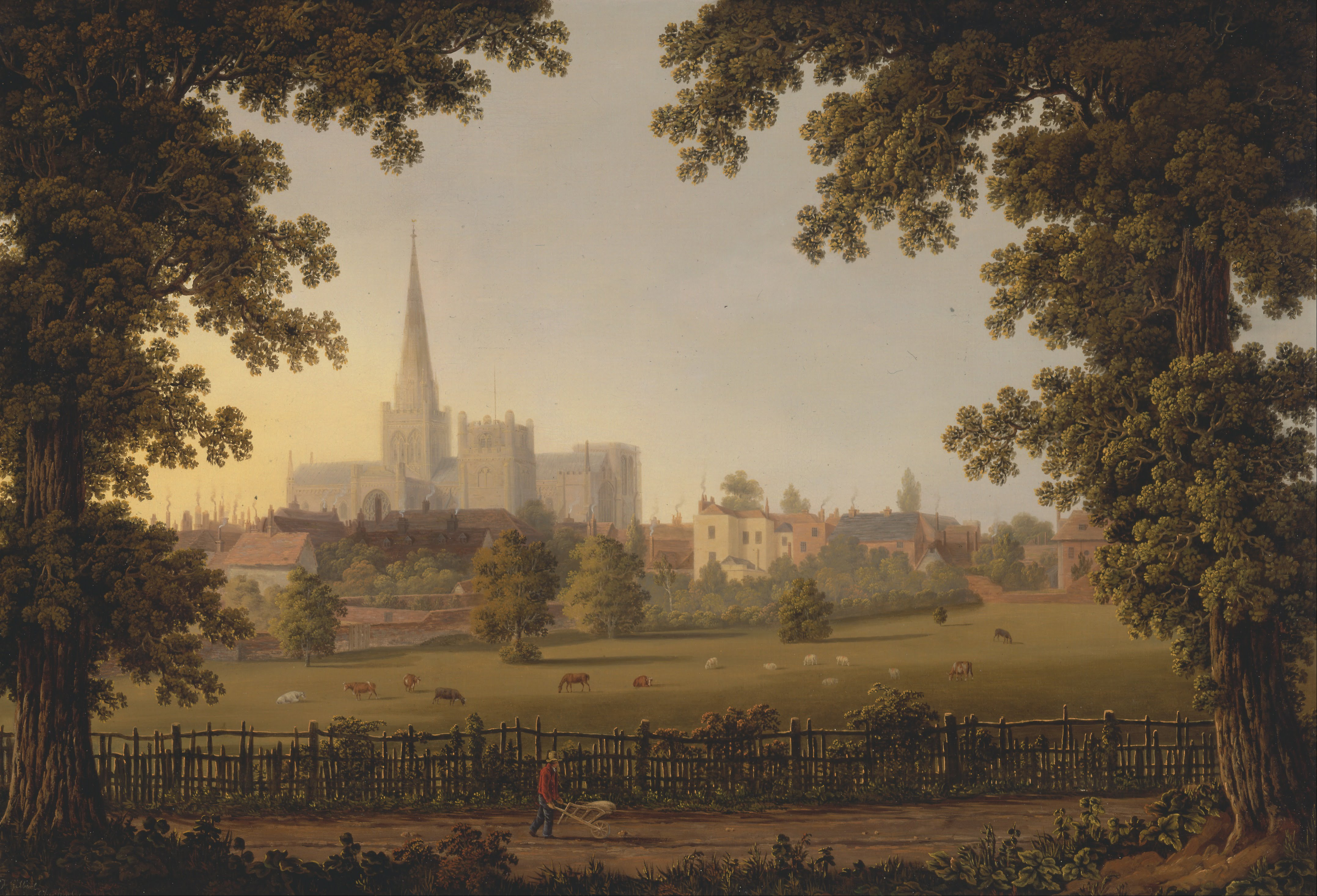
Painting of Chichester Cathedral by Gilbert in 1833.

Joseph Francis Gilbert was born in 1792 to Edward Gilbert.

Gilbert was known for painting landscapes and scenery in Sussex, England. He resided in Chichester for several years and painted a number of scenes at Goodwood Racecourse.

A painting by Gilbert is displayed in the tapestry bedroom at Uppark House, it depicts the view of the village of South Harting from the house.

Gilbert died on 25 September 1855, at 17 Hoptons Almshouses, Green Walk in Southwark, London.
