= Chichester Cathedral =

Cathedral in West Sussex, England

- Cathedral Church of the Holy Trinity
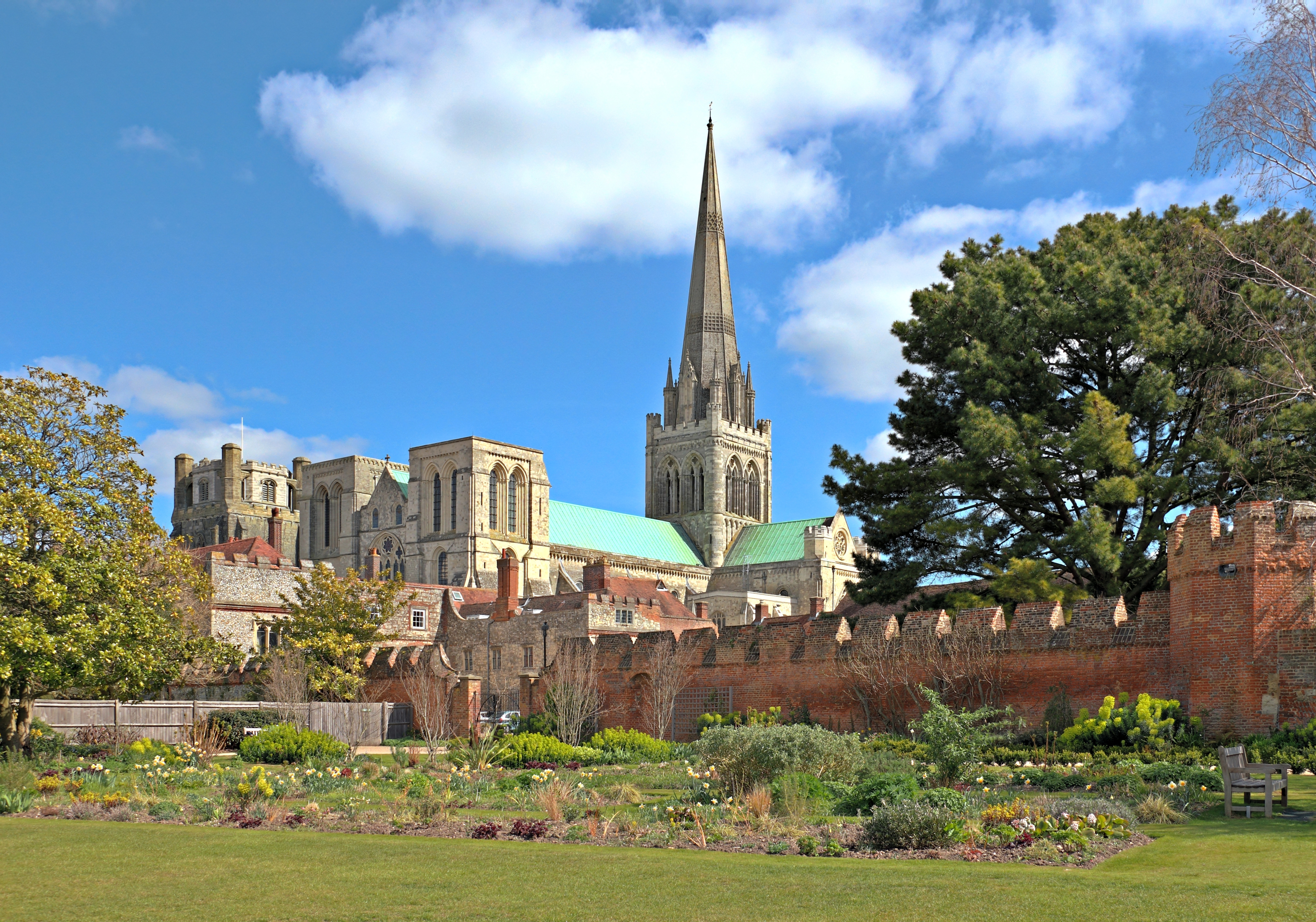

- Location within West Sussex
- GB-WSX 50.8363°N 0.7808°W
- OS grid reference: SU 85956 04776
- Location: Chichester, West Sussex
- Country: England
- Denomination: Church of England
- Previous denomination: Roman Catholicism
- Website: chichestercathedral.org.uk

History
- Consecrated: 1108

Architecture
- Style: Norman, Gothic

Specifications
- Length: 408 ft (124 m)
- Width: 157 ft (48 m)
- Height: 61 ft (19 m)

Administration
- Province: Canterbury
- Diocese: Chichester

Clergy
- Bishop: Martin Warner
- Dean: Edward Dowler
- Chancellor: Gregory Collins
- Treasurer: Vanessa Baron

Chichester Cathedral, formally known as the Cathedral Church of the Holy Trinity, is the seat of the Anglican Bishop of Chichester. It is located in Chichester, in West Sussex, England. It was founded as a cathedral in 1075, when the seat of the bishop was moved from Selsey.

Chichester Cathedral has fine architecture in both the Norman and the Gothic styles, and has been described by the architectural critic Ian Nairn as "the most typical English Cathedral". Despite this, Chichester has two architectural features that are unique among England's medieval cathedrals—a free-standing medieval bell tower (or campanile) and double aisles. The cathedral contains two rare medieval sculptures, and many modern art works including tapestries, stained glass and sculpture, many of these commissioned by Walter Hussey (Dean, 1955–1977).

The city of Chichester, though it retains two main cross streets laid out by the Romans, has always been small enough for the city's entire population to fit inside the cathedral at once, causing Daniel Defoe to comment:

I cannot say much of Chichester, in which, if six or seven good families were removed, there would not be much conversation, except what is to be found among the canons, and the dignitaries of the cathedral.

The spire of Chichester Cathedral is the third tallest in England and acts as a landmark for travellers. It is the only spire from a medieval English cathedral that is visible from the sea. (Note: Its near neighbour, Portsmouth Cathedral, a parish church founded in the 12th century and raised to cathedral status in the 20th century, does not have a spire but can be seen from the sea.)

== History ==
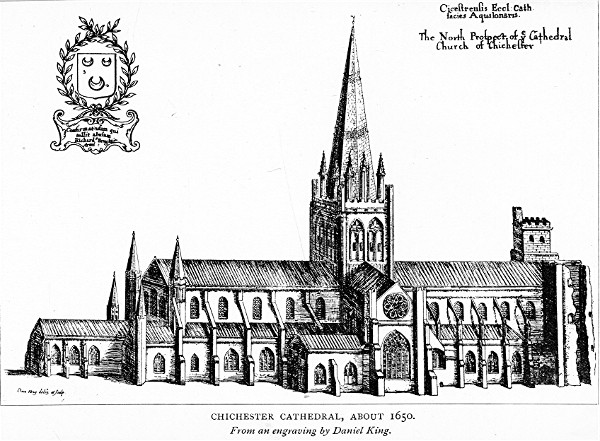
Chichester Cathedral, circa 1650

Chichester Cathedral was built to replace the cathedral founded in 681 by St Wilfrid for the South Saxons at Selsey. The seat of the bishop was transferred in 1075.

It was consecrated in 1108 under Bishop Ralph de Luffa. An early addition was the Chapel of Saint Pantaleon off the south transept (now the Canons' Vestry), probably begun just before an 1187 fire which burnt out the cathedral and destroyed much of the town. That fire necessitated a substantial rebuilding, which included refacing the nave and replacing the destroyed wooden ceiling with the present stone vault, possibly by Walter of Coventry. The cathedral was reconsecrated in 1199.

In the 13th century, the central tower was completed, the Norman apsidal eastern end rebuilt with a Lady chapel and a row of chapels added on each side of the nave, forming double aisles such as are found on many French cathedrals. The spire was completed about 1402 and a free-standing bell tower constructed to the north of the west end. (Note: The practice of separating the campanile from the main building is common in Italy, where ground movement is a problem because of both subsidence and earthquake.)

In 1262, Richard de la Wyche, who was bishop from 1245 to 1253, was canonised as Saint Richard of Chichester. His shrine made the cathedral a place of pilgrimage. The shrine was ordered to be destroyed in 1538 during the first stages of the English Reformation. In 1642 the cathedral came under siege by Parliamentary troops.

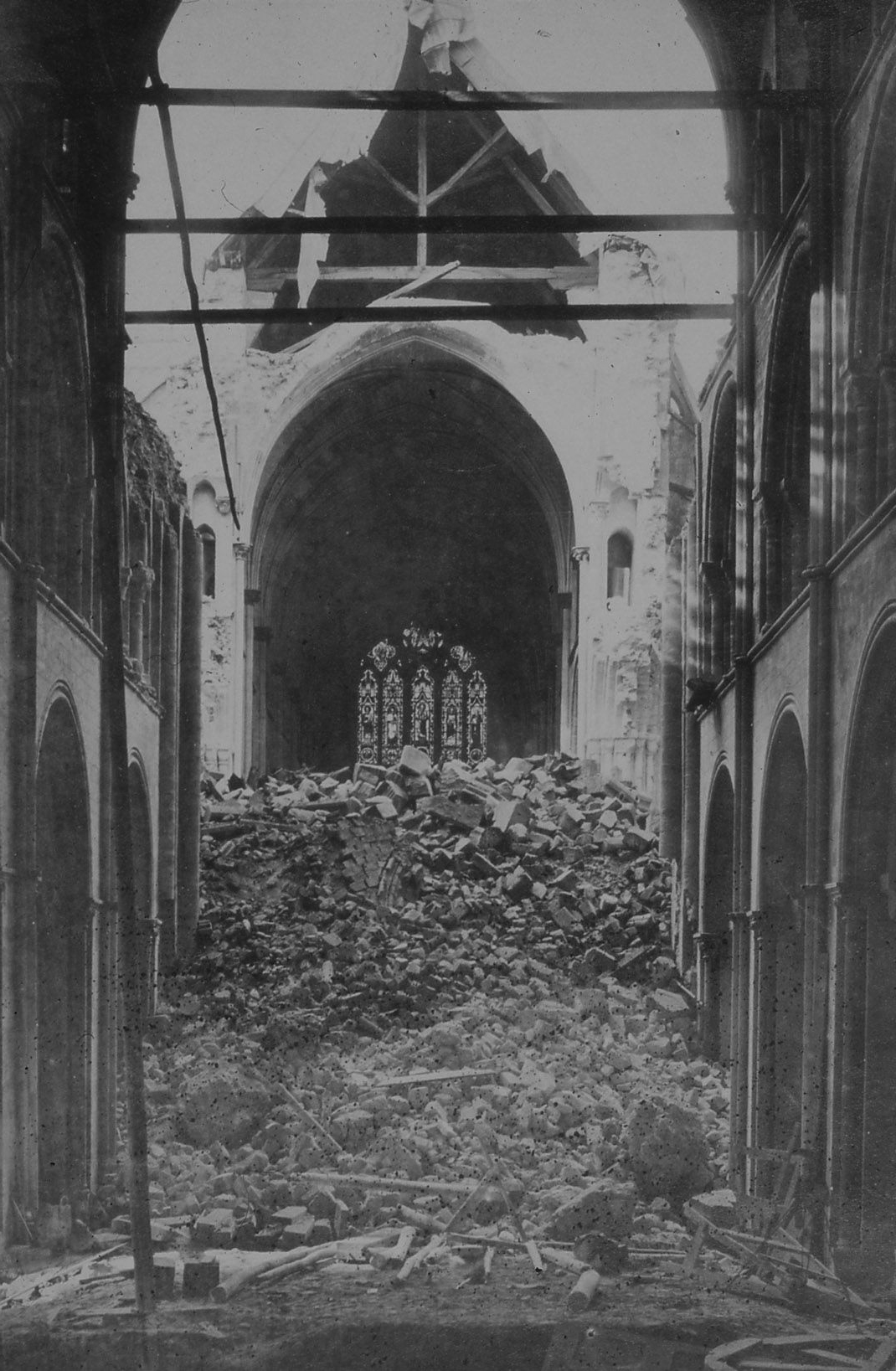
The aftermath of the collapse of the spire in 1861

The towers at Chichester have had a particularly unfortunate history because of subsidence, which explains the positioning of the 15th century bell tower at some distance from the cathedral. The south-west tower of the façade collapsed in 1210 and was rebuilt. The north-west tower collapsed in 1635 and was not rebuilt until 1901. The masonry spire was built in the 14th century and was repaired in the 17th century by Christopher Wren.

The tower survived a lightning strike in 1721. During the 18th century various works are recorded including repairs to the upper part of the spire after the lightning strike. However the cathedral was in a poor state of repair. A restoration programme was begun starting in 1812 and in 1829 the cathedral was closed for several months while major repairs and improvements were carried out. George Chandler became dean in 1832 and continued with the restoration, the sub-deanery was removed to a brand new church, a project completed by Walter Hook who took over as dean in 1849. Then on 21 February 1861, the cathedral spire telescoped in on itself, without loss of life. Works in the cathedral had included the removal of a stone screen (known as the Arundel screen) that separated the choir from the nave. There was some discussion that its removal had caused the collapse of the spire. A more likely cause was thought to be that the spire's foundations had been subject to subsidence over the years and had become detached from the tower, leaving the tower freestanding; also that the rubble cores of the columns holding the spire had become dust. Thus a weakened tower collapsed in the face of high winds. The collapse apparently inspired J. Meade Falkner to write his novel The Nebuly Coat.

A fund was set up to raise the £48,000 needed for the rebuilding, and the contributors included Queen Victoria and Prince Albert. A replica of the old tower and spire was rebuilt along the original lines by George Gilbert Scott from drawings which had been made by Joseph Butler, architect to the fabric (1847–1888). The construction was raised by about 6 feet (1.8 m), by Scott and was completed in five years. It now rises to a height of 82 metres (269 ft). The rubble from the original spire was used to construct the former West Ashling Congregational Chapel. (Note: The old Congregational Chapel closed between 1934 and 1938 and became a clock museum run by the Clock trust. The museum closed when the Clock Trust was dissolved in 2018.)

In 2008, the cathedral community celebrated the 900th anniversary of the building's consecration. Rowan Williams, then Archbishop of Canterbury, was invited to preach at a festival eucharist and dedicate the new guest house, which was originally named after Bishop George Bell. The cathedral's green copper roof (installed after WWII) was replaced in an extensive roof renovation programme in the early 2020s, with grey lead coverings of the thickest type available – each panel weighs around 75 kg (12 stone). Unlike the copper coverings, these will give better protection from the coastal weather.

== Architecture ==
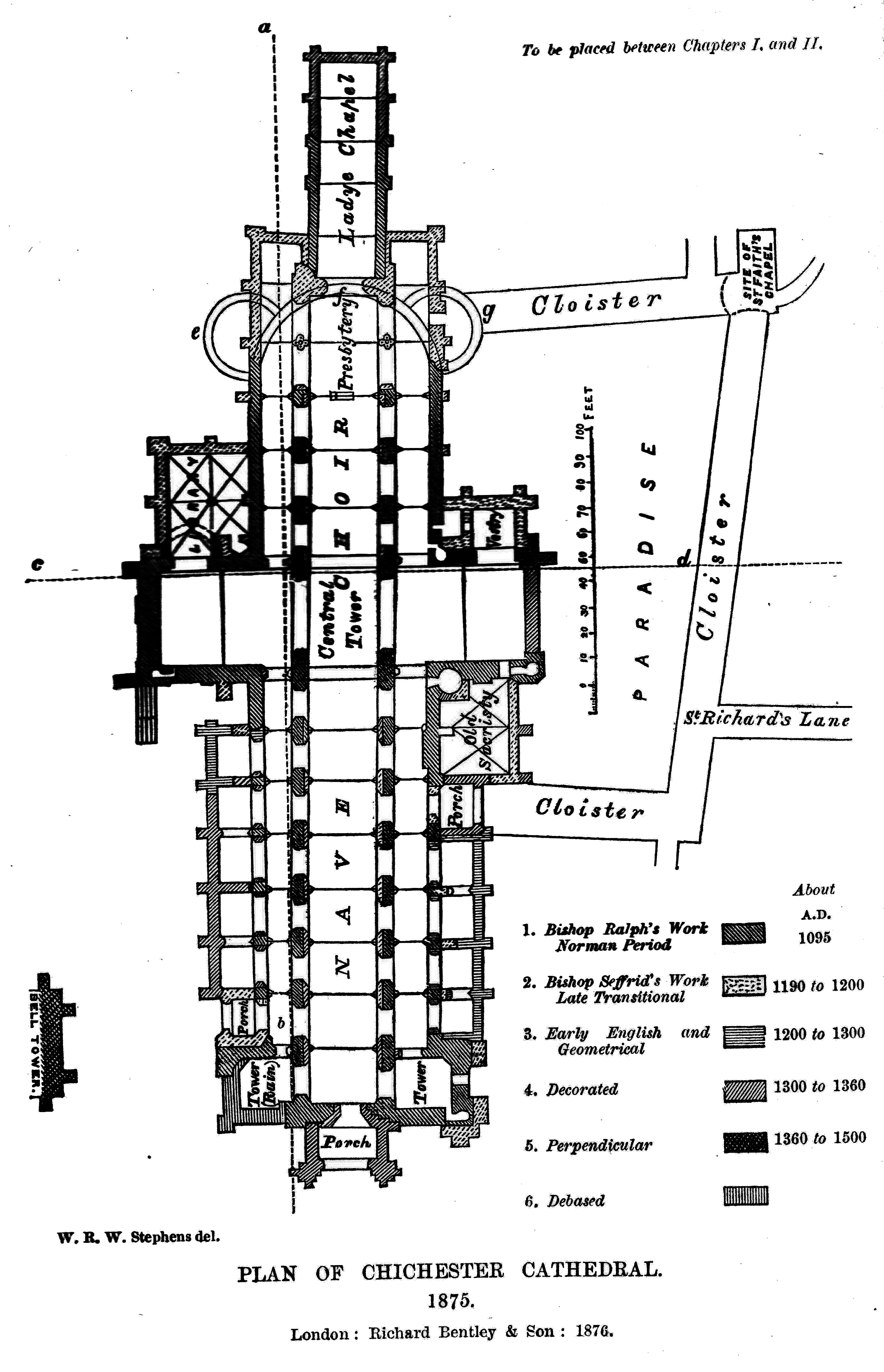
Plan of Chichester Cathedral, produced in 1875

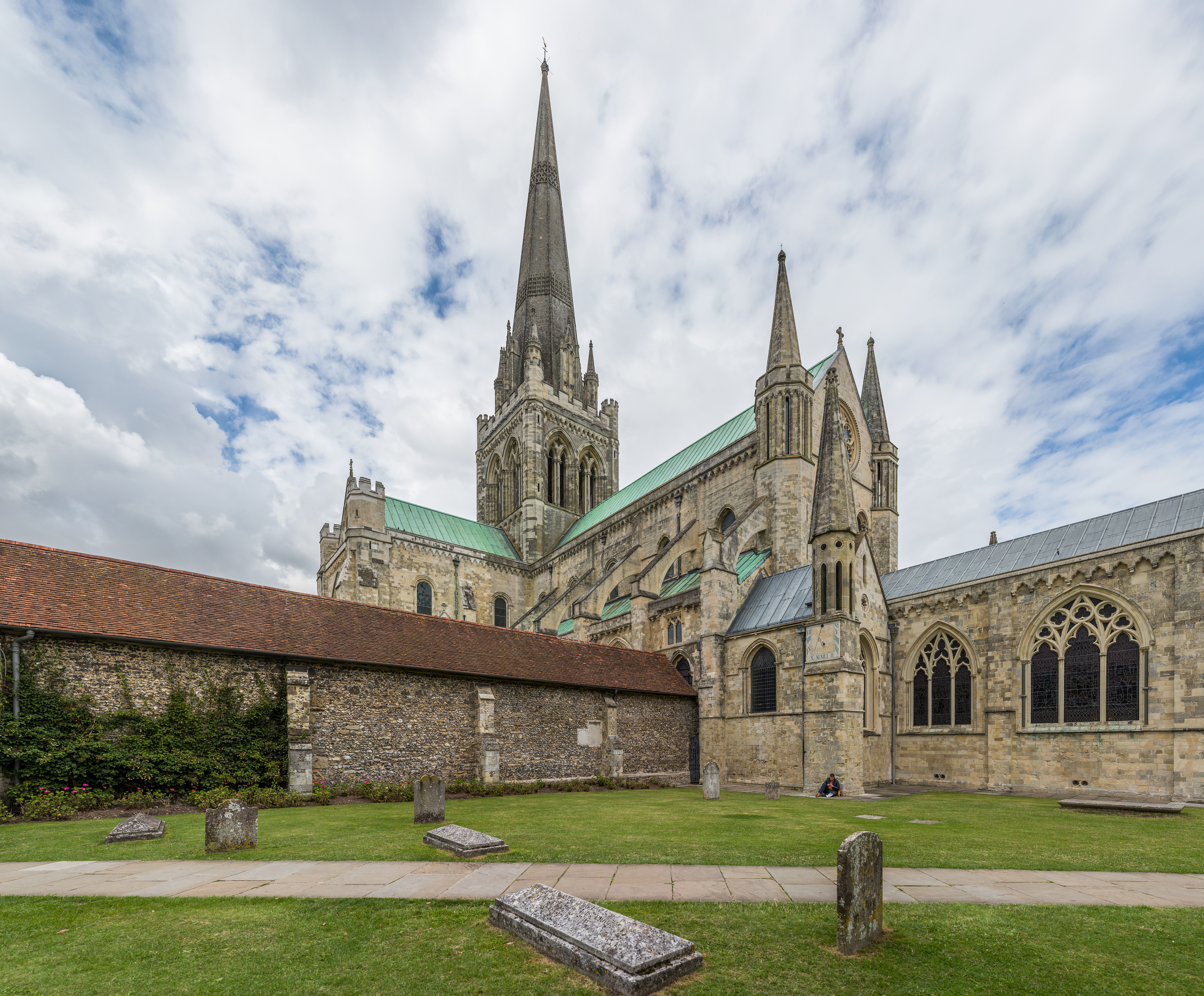
Exterior from southeast

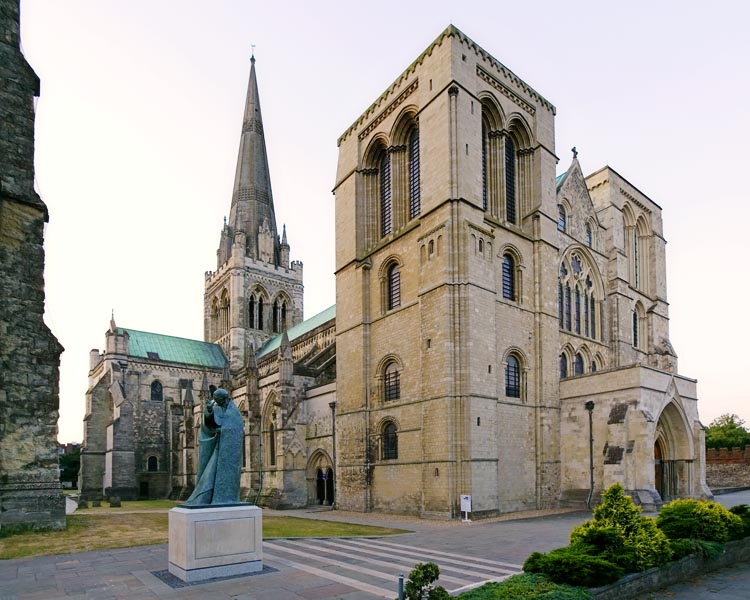
Exterior from northwest

Typically for English cathedrals, Chichester has had a long and varied building history marked by a number of disasters. The architectural history of the building is revealed in its fabric because the builders of different periods constructed in different styles and with changing technology. Both inside and outside portions of the original Norman cathedral can be distinguished from the later Gothic work by the massive construction and round-topped windows. Different Gothic styles from the late 12th century through to the 15th can also be identified.

The plan of Chichester is in the shape of a cross, with an aisled nave and choir, crossed by a transept. In typically English manner, the eastern end of the building is long by comparison with the nave, is square ended and has a projecting Lady chapel. Also typically English is the arrangement of paired towers on the western front, and a taller central tower over the crossing. Its plan is unusual for England in having double aisles. Chichester has a cloister on the south side of the building.

Chichester is small for a Norman cathedral when compared to Winchester Cathedral, Ely and Peterborough. Much of the original Norman construction remains in the nave, transept, crossing and adjacent bays of the choir. The elevation rises in the usual three stages of arcade, gallery and clerestory. It is similar to remaining Norman work at Winchester, where the arcade is proportionally low, and rests on solid piers rather than columns. In the gallery above, each wide space is divided into two by a colonnette in a manner typical of Romanesque architecture.

After the fire of 1187, the clerestory was rebuilt and the entire building given a ribbed vault. The eastern end was extended from the round ambulatory to form a square retroquire or presbytery with lancet windows in a style that is transitional between Norman and Gothic. The newer arcades and the clerestory maintain the round arches of the earlier Norman architecture. The vault is in the Early English Gothic style, supported externally by flying buttresses and large terminal pinnacles at the eastern end. At this time the entire interior was refurbished, much of it being refaced with ashlar masonry. Each pier was decorated with delicate shafts of dark Purbeck marble with foliate capitals, contrasting with the squat cushion capitals of the limestone shafts. The entire programme of work was probably directed by Walter of Coventry. The nave was later divided from the choir by an elegant Perpendicular screen or pulpitum with three arched openings, called the Arundel Screen, which was removed in the mid 19th century but reinstated in 1961.

The design of the central tower, faithfully reproduced by George Gilbert Scott, was of the Early English style, having on each side two tall pairs of openings, surrounded by deep mouldings.

The original spire, which also was of masonry rather than of sheathed wood, was built in the late 14th century, by John Mason (died ca 1403), who also built the Vicars' Hall. The style and construction of the spire are obviously based on that of Salisbury Cathedral but it is not as ambitiously tall, probably because of the problem of subsidence. At 277 ft (84 m) high, it is the fourth tallest cathedral spire in the UK after Salisbury, Norwich and Coventry. The Lady chapel, constructed to the east of the retro-choir, is a long narrow space, with large windows in the Decorated Gothic style of the late 13th century.

The other buildings related to the cathedral are the free-standing bell-tower of the early 15th century, probably the work of William Wynford who also designed the cloisters, with openings in the Perpendicular style.

St Mary's Almshouses in Chichester, which are linked to the cathedral, is a Christian charity dating from the 13th century. The medieval Hospital, associated with the Alms House, is one of only two such buildings in the world, the other being in Germany.

Cathedral interior

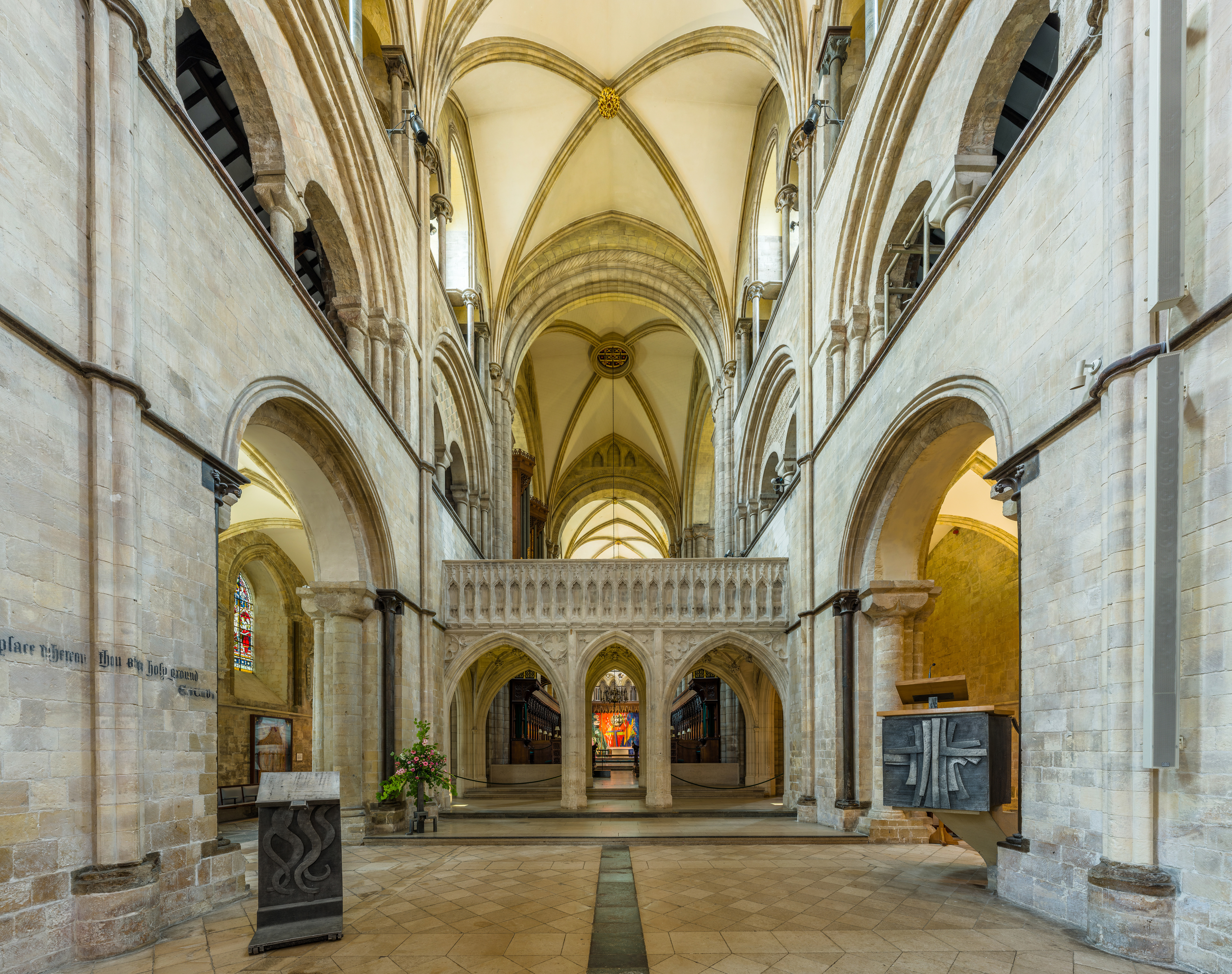
Arundel Screen

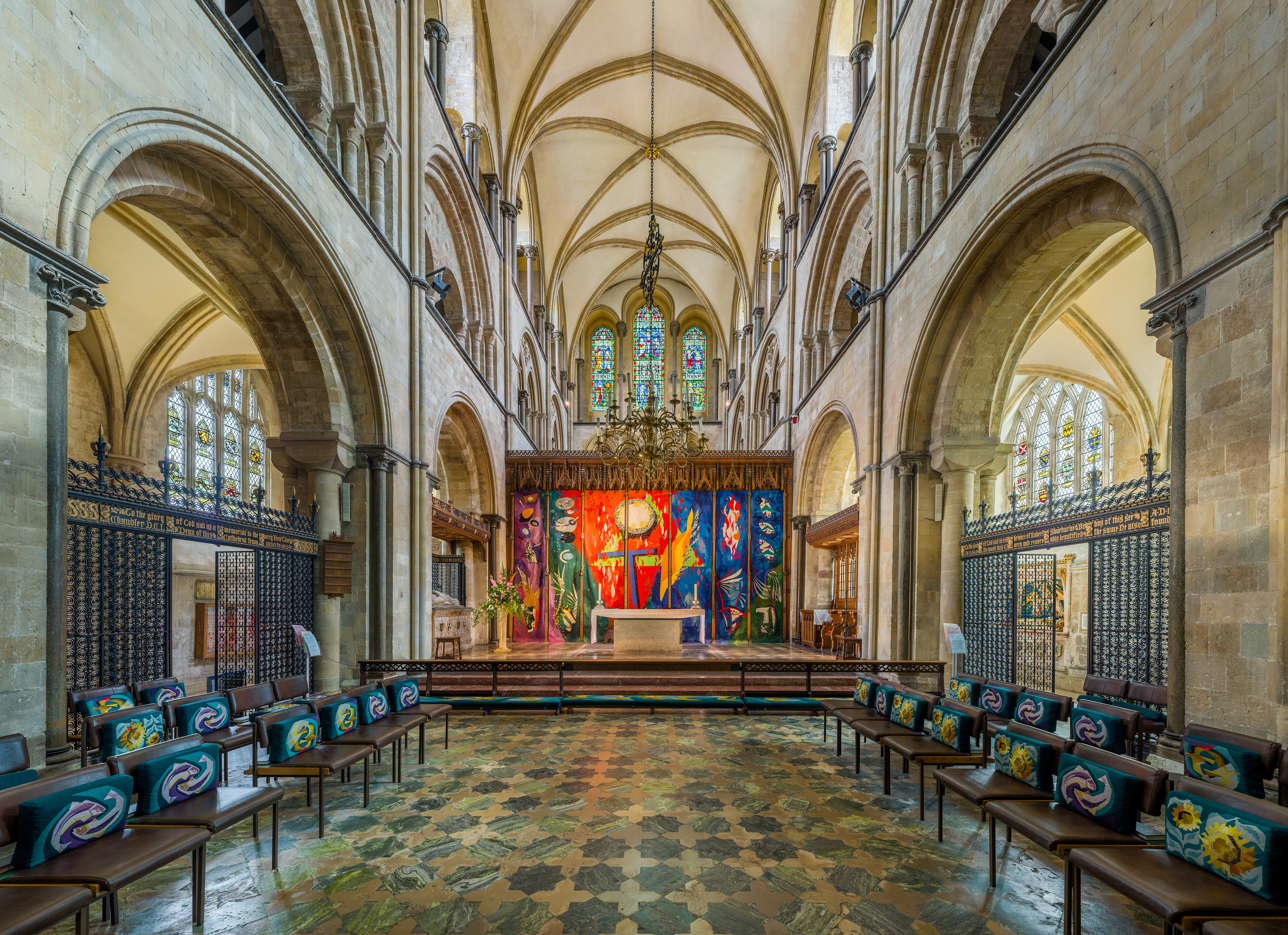
High altar

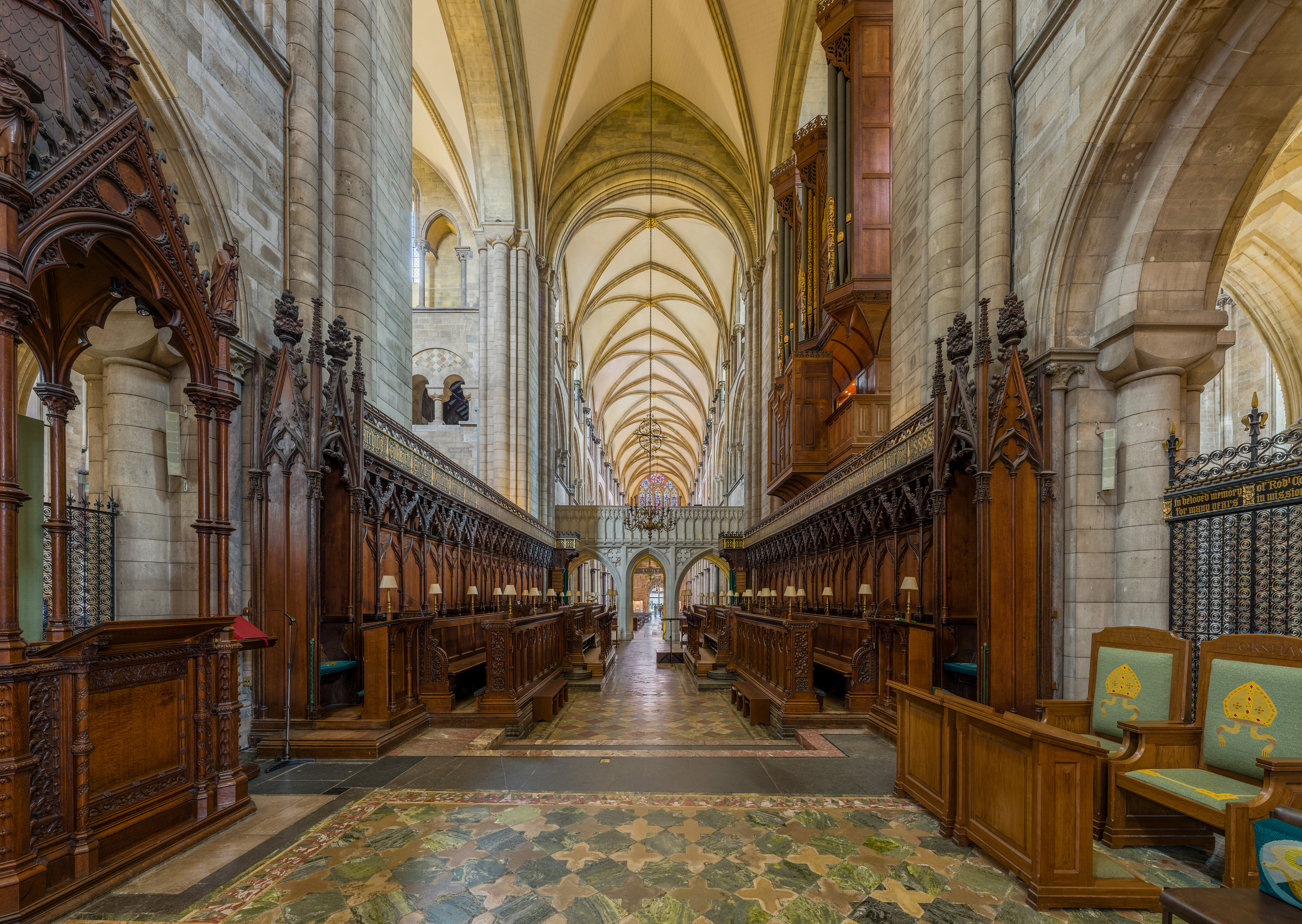
Choir

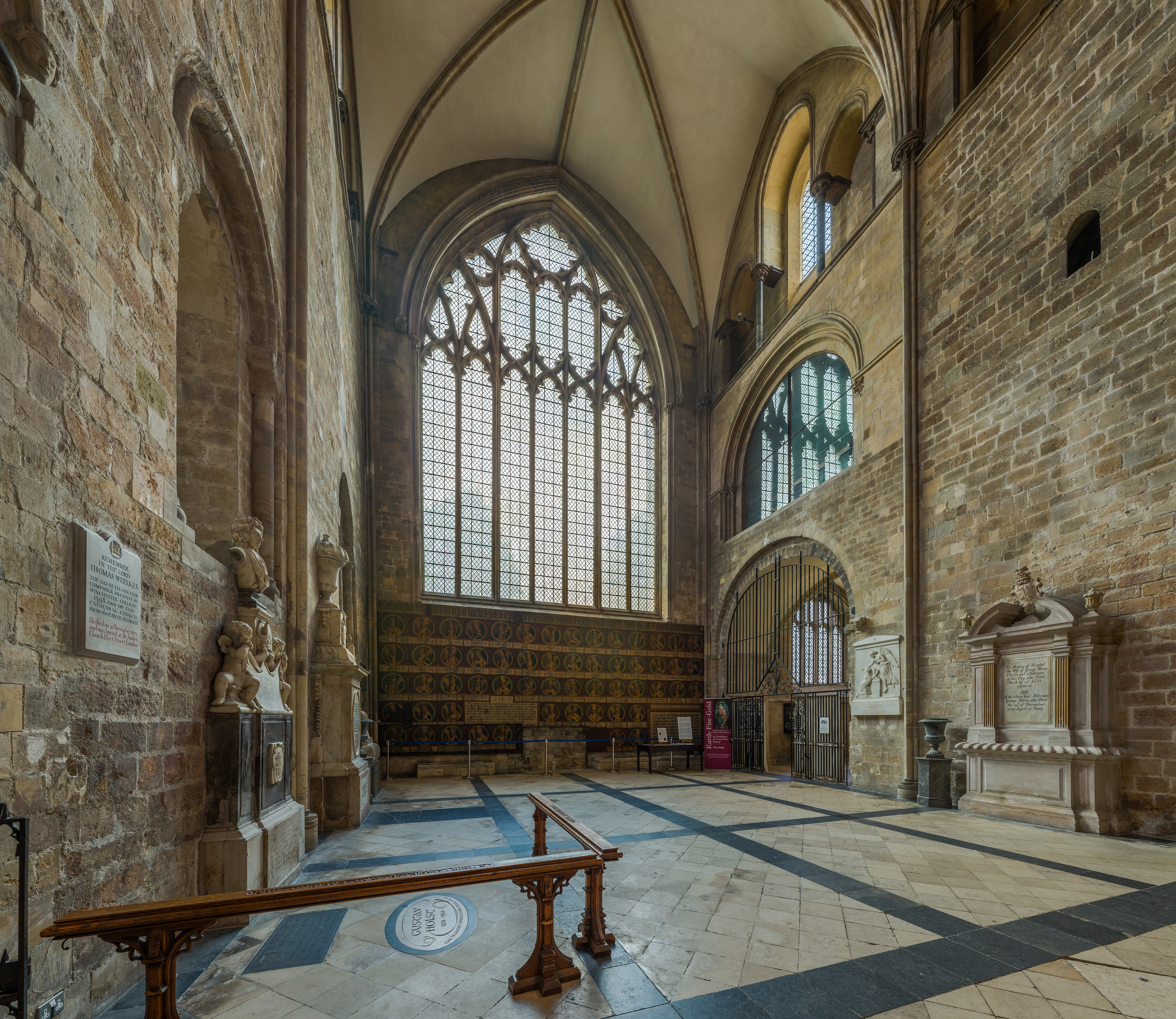
North transept

== Treasures ==
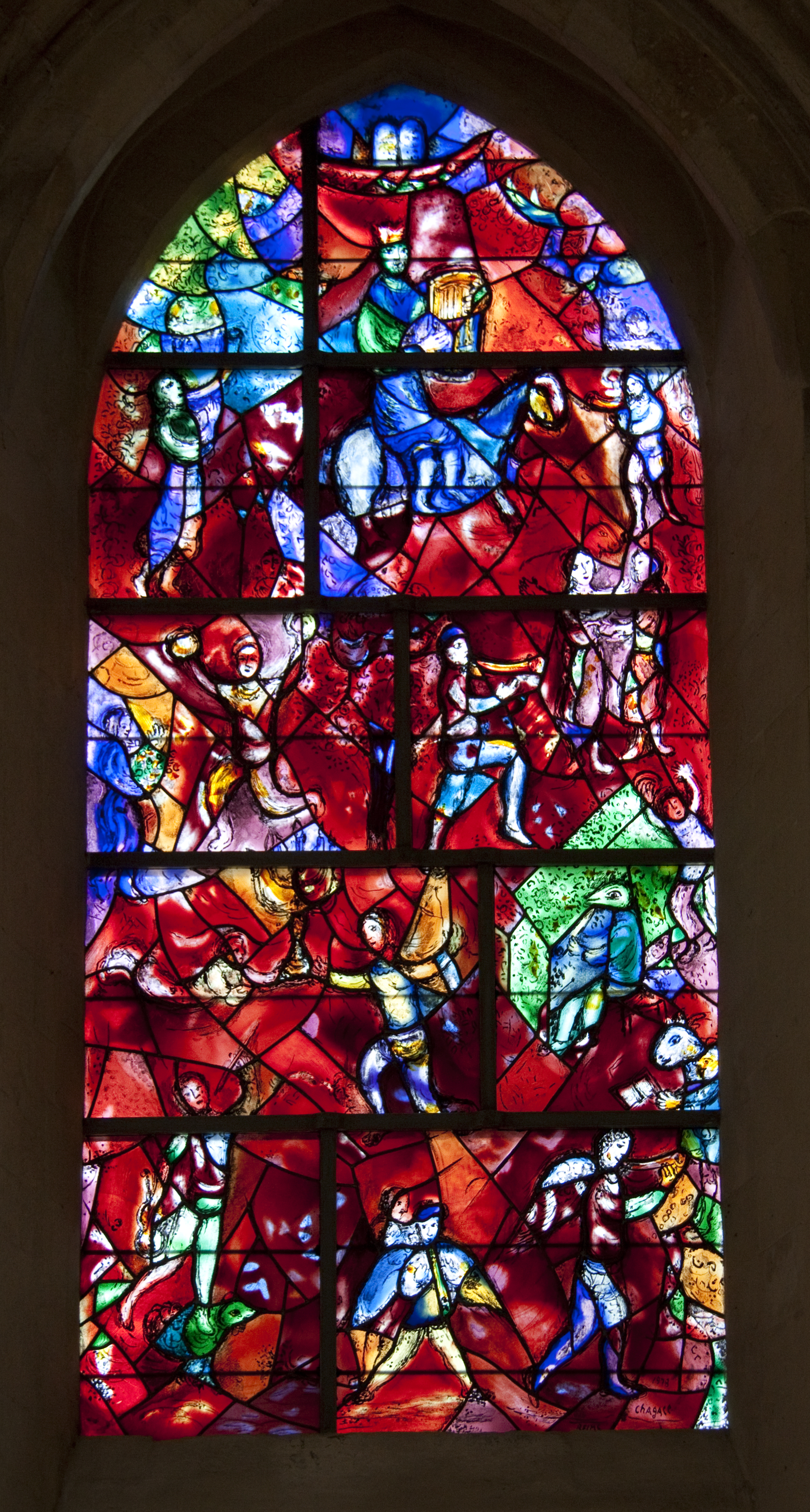
Stained-glass window by Marc Chagall

The cathedral has many treasures and artworks, the most precious being two carved reliefs dating from the 12th century which are of exceptional rarity among English sculpture. Other ancient treasures include the remains of a Roman mosaic pavement, which can be viewed through a glass window, and a set of thirty-eight medieval misericords, dating from 1330, which remain beneath the seats of the choir, despite the fact that other parts of the choir stalls are largely a Victorian reconstruction.

Among the famous graves are those of the composer Gustav Holst and the Gothic "Arundel tomb", showing the recumbent Richard FitzAlan, 10th Earl of Arundel (1313–1376), holding hands with his second wife, Eleanor of Lancaster (1318–1372). The tomb was celebrated in the poem An Arundel Tomb by Philip Larkin. Also resting there is Joan de Vere, grandmother of Richard FitzAlan, who died in 1293. She was first buried at Lewes Priory, as was her grandson, but their tombs were relocated to Chichester at the time of the Dissolution of the monasteries.

The cathedral contains many modern works of art, including tapestries by John Piper and Ursula Benker-Schirmer, a window by Marc Chagall, a painting by Graham Sutherland (Noli me Tangere), a sculpture and a font by John Skelton and a reredos for the St John the Baptist's Chapel by Patrick Procktor. Outside the cathedral stands a bronze statue of St Richard of Chichester by Philip Jackson.

The cathedral also contains a pennant presented by Francis Chichester, which hung on his ship when he circumnavigated the globe.

== Dean and chapter ==
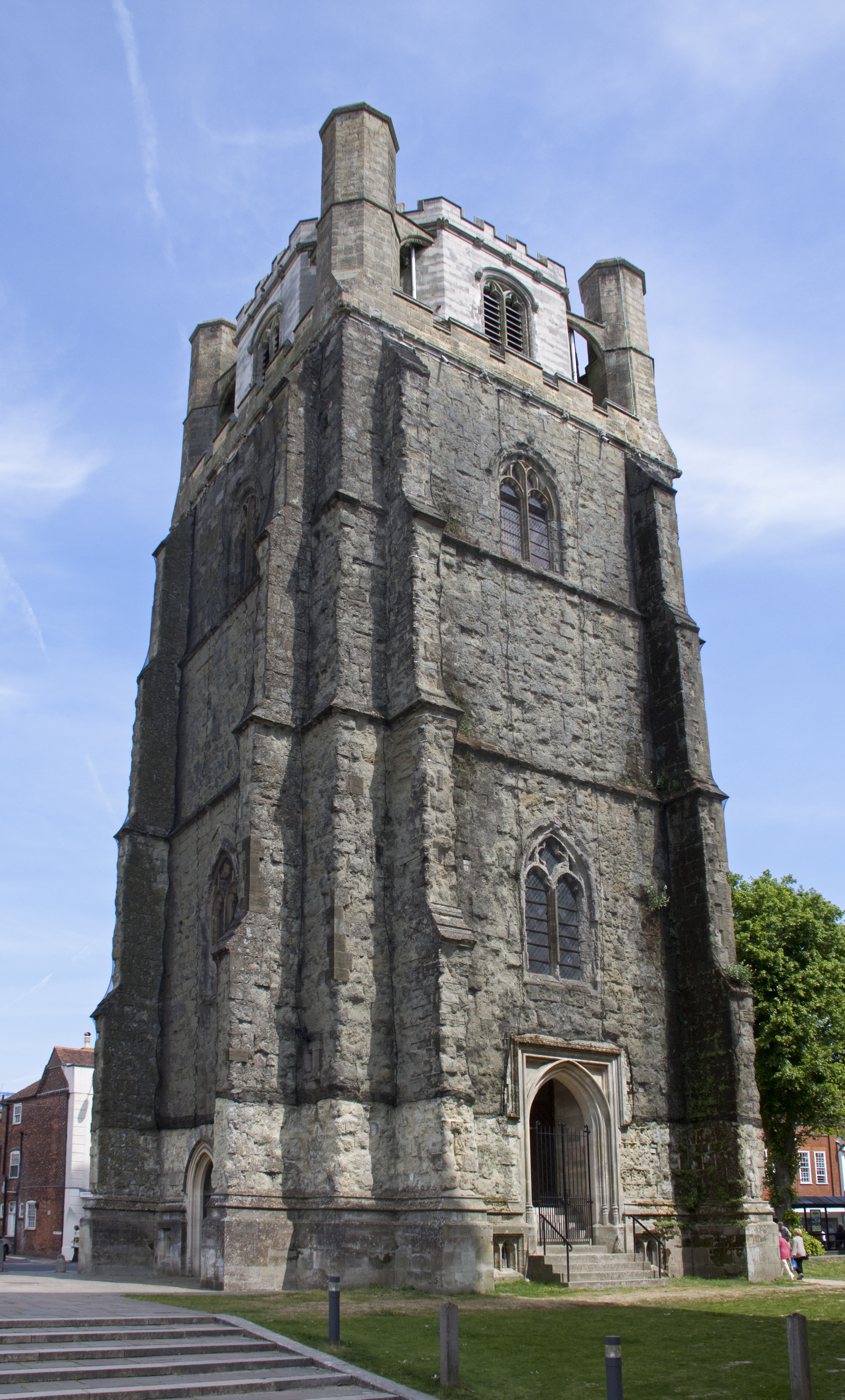
The 15th-century free-standing bell tower

The current Dean of Chichester is Edward Dowler who was installed on 14 September 2024.

Earl Collins was installed as Canon Chancellor on 12 October 2025.

Vanessa Baron is Canon Treasurer who was installed on 26 September 2021.

Lay members of the chapter include Howard Castle-Smith and Anita Rolls.

Robert Sherburne, the Bishop of Chichester, founded four prebends known as the Wiccamical prebends in 1524.

== Music ==
The music at Chichester Cathedral is largely led by the organ and the cathedral choir, as there are services daily and on special days in the calendar. Outside the regular services the cathedral also supports all kinds of music both religious and secular. Visiting choirs, who come from the diocese's parishes and elsewhere, sing in the cathedral from time to time. It is common for guest choirs to sing at Evensong during the week.

The cathedral hosts a variety of concerts that, along with those in the evening, includes a popular series of free lunchtime concerts. It provides a venue for visiting artists from across the world as well as those who are locally based, such as the Chichester Singers, who although an independent organisation, have since their formation in 1954, performed all their major concerts in the cathedral.

=== Organs and organists ===
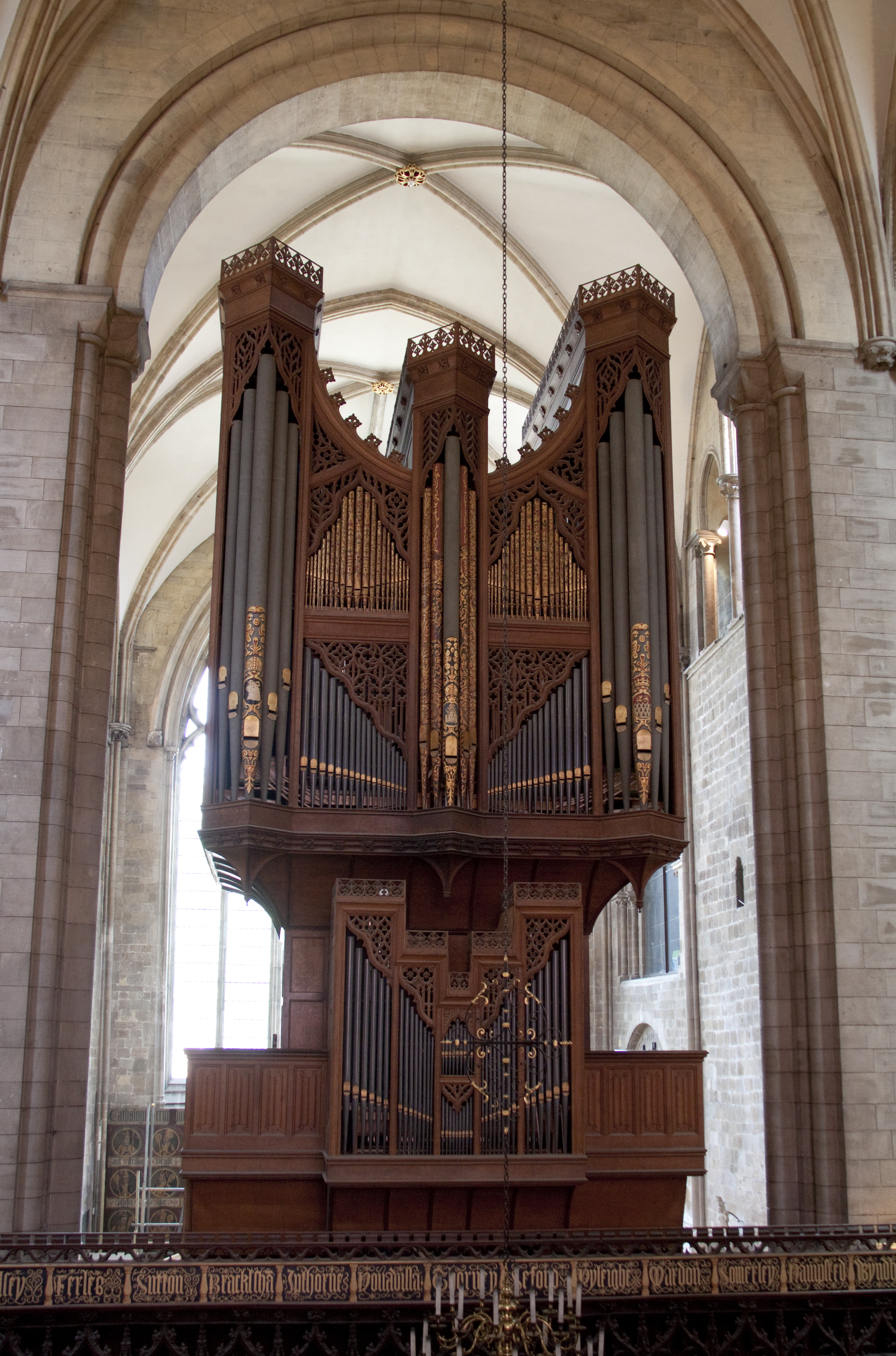
Main organ

There has been organ music at Chichester Cathedral almost continuously since the medieval period, with a break during the Commonwealth. There are now five pipe organs of different sizes and styles at Chichester Cathedral, with pipes of the Main Organ dating to the Restoration, the Hurd Organ to the late 18th century and the three most recent organs, the Nave Organ, the Walker Organ, which is a small portable organ in the Baroque style, and the Allen Organ, an early example of a digital electronic organ, dating to the late 20th century.

Several well-known composers, including Thomas Weelkes and John Reading (snr), have served as cathedral organist. Anne Maddocks (assistant organist, 1942–1949) was the first woman in the country to hold such a post in a cathedral, and Sarah Baldock (organist and master of the choristers, 2008–2014) was the second woman to hold the most senior musical post in a Church of England cathedral.

The current organist and master of the choristers is Charles Harrison. The assistant organist is Timothy Ravalde.

=== Cathedral choir ===
Chichester Cathedral Choir consists of eighteen choristers and four probationers, all of whom are educated at the Prebendal School (which sits adjacent to the Cathedral precinct and is the Cathedral Choir School), and six lay vicars, who are professional musicians.

During school term the cathedral choir sing at eight services each week. As well as singing, choristers learn the piano and an orchestral instrument, spending at least eighteen hours a week on musical performance.

The choir regularly tours abroad and in recent years has visited France and Northern Bavaria (Bamberg, Bayreuth, Nuremberg and Würzburg) and makes frequent visits to Chartres, Chichester's twin city. In 2005, the choir made a tour to South Africa.

== Clock ==
The turret clock was set going on 9 November 1878 in memory of Dean Walter Hook. It had been constructed by J. B. Joyce & Co of Whitchurch, with a double three-legged gravity escapement and Westminster chimes ringing on the 2nd, 3rd and 4th bells of the peal. It struck the hour on a bell weighing 73 long hundredweight (3,700 kg). The main wheels of the quarter and striking trains were 20 inches (51 cm) in diameter. The pendulum weight was 2.5 long hundredweight (130 kg).

== Bells ==
The tower contains a ring of eight bells with a tenor dating from 1706 cast by Richard Phelps with a weight of 2,056 pounds (933 kg). The bells ring in the key of E flat.

In addition there is an hour bell cast by John Taylor & Co from 1877 weighing 73 long hundredweight (3,700 kg) struck by a hammer of 140 pounds (64 kg) and a service bell from ca. 1399 cast by William Dawe.

== Art and popular culture ==
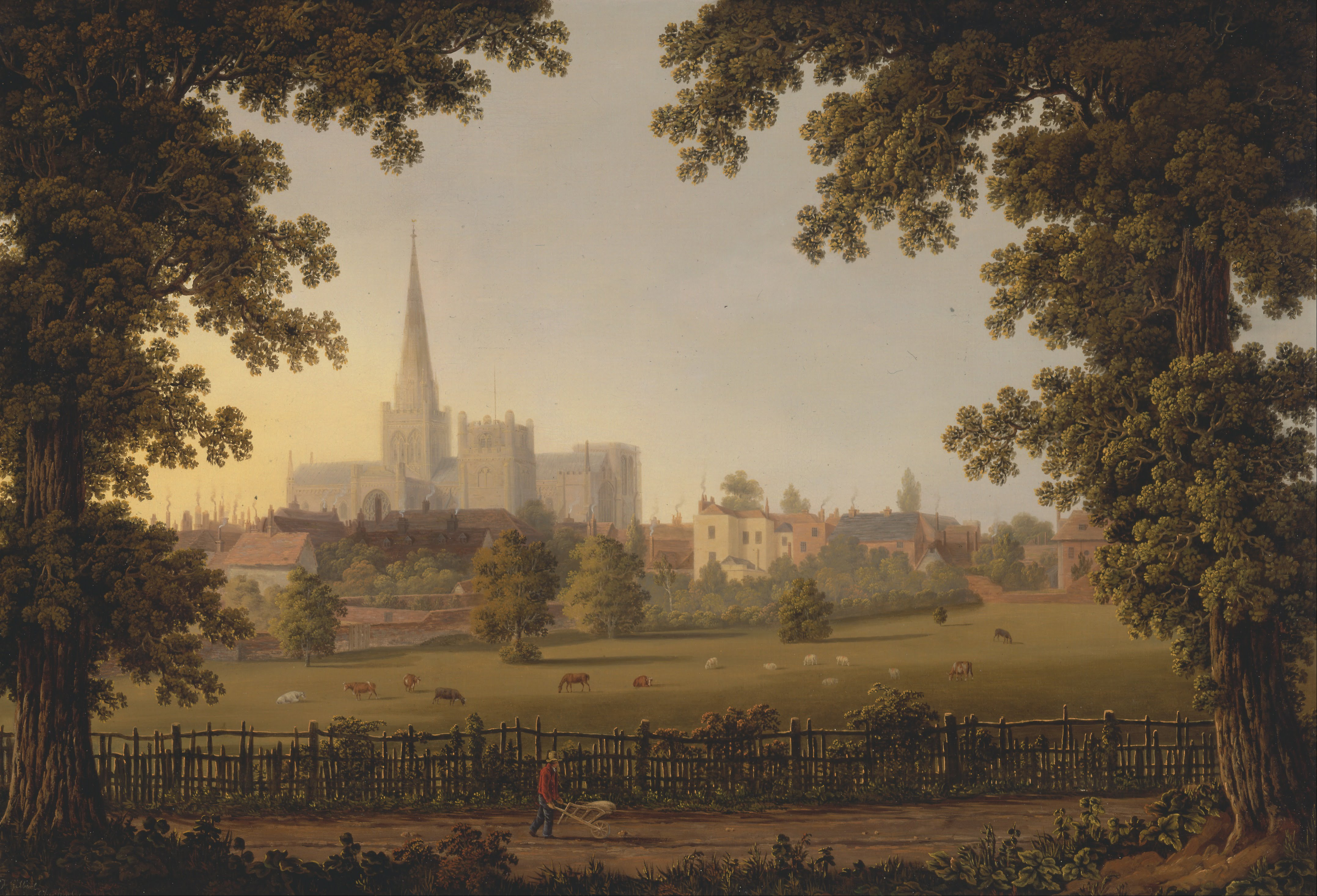
Chichester Cathedral by Joseph Francis Gilbert in 1833

The cathedral has been the subject of a number of depictions in art, literature, and television media. Its spire and towers are visible in the 1828 painting, Chichester Canal, by J. M. W. Turner. It is also speculated, by Eric Shanes, that Chichester Cathedral is the subject of one of Turner's colour studies for Picturesque Views in England and Wales. In 1833, Joseph Francis Gilbert produced an oil painting of the cathedral, showing the surrounding cityscape. It was collected by Paul Mellon and gifted to the Yale Center for British Art, which he established, in 1966. John Constable completed his own watercolour of the cathedral in 1824, now located in the Victoria and Albert Museum in London.

Leonard Bernstein's Chichester Psalms was commissioned for the 1965 Southern Cathedrals Festival at Chichester Cathedral by the cathedral's Dean, Walter Hussey, although the premiere of the piece was in New York City.

The building and grounds are occasionally used as a film location. Credits include Rumpole of the Bailey (s05e03) as "Lawnchester Cathedral", The Ruth Rendell Mysteries (s10e08) as "Marchester Cathedral", and Rosemary & Thyme (s03e02) as "Wellminster Cathedral".

Chichester Cathedral is referenced in s01e10 of Monty Python's Flying Circus: one of Ron Obvious's tasks to gain public fame involves eating the cathedral. He is shown brushing his teeth, putting on a bib, and flexing his jaws, before biting into the corner of the cathedral and breaking his jaw.

== Burials ==
- Charles Lennox, 1st Duke of Richmond
- Charles Lennox, 2nd Duke of Richmond
- Charles Lennox, 3rd Duke of Richmond
- Charles Gordon-Lennox, 7th Duke of Richmond
- James Hargraves

== Wildlife ==
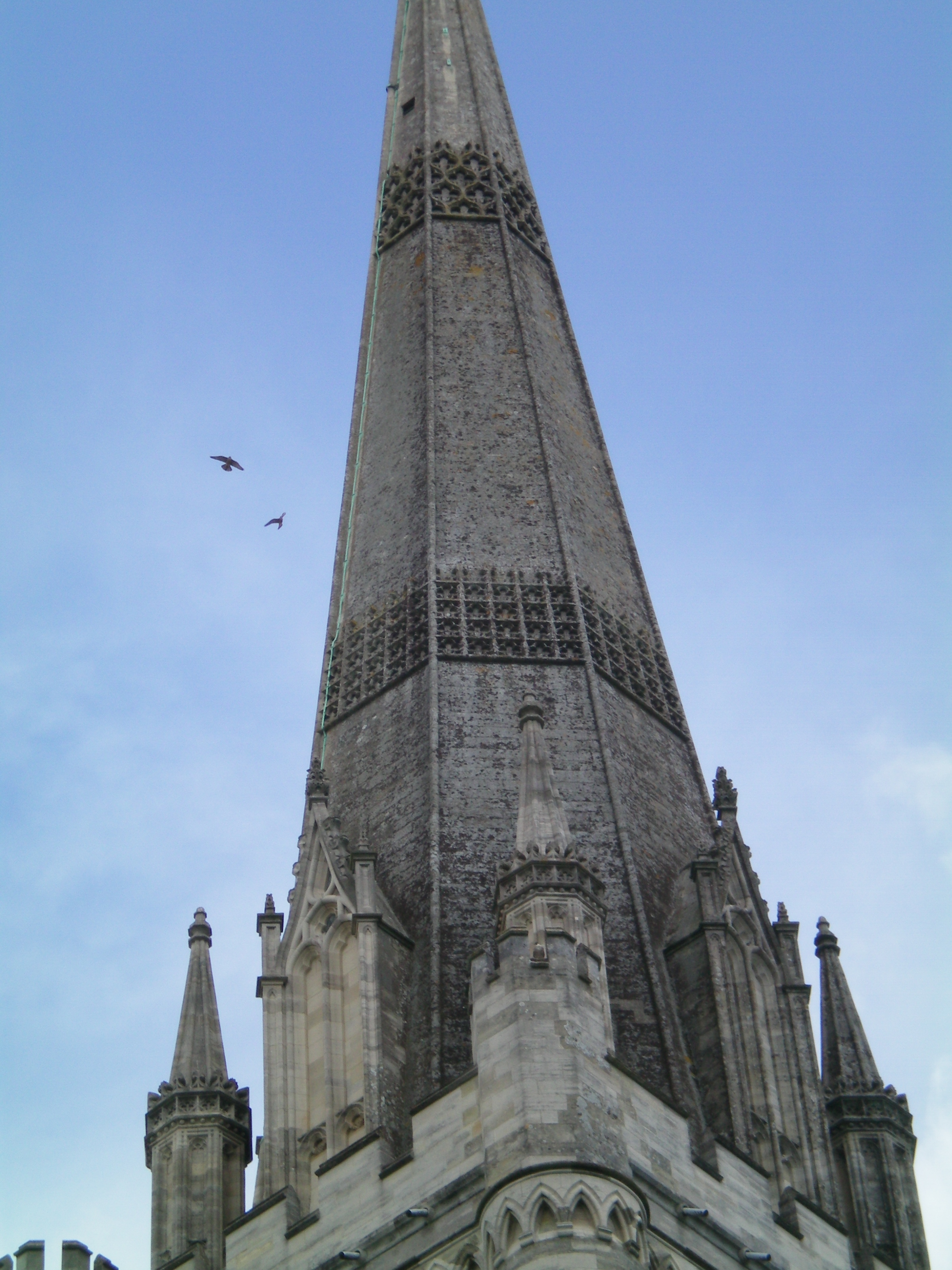
Peregrine falcons in flight over the cathedral

The cathedral is a nesting site for peregrine falcons, which use a crenellated turret at the base of the spire. Three female and one male chick were hatched in April 2009. During the nesting season live video of the chicks is shown inside the cathedral and on the website.

== See also ==
- Architecture of the medieval cathedrals of England
- List of current places of worship in Chichester (district)
- List of cathedrals in England and Wales
- List of deans of Chichester
- List of Gothic cathedrals in Europe
