= Gregory Collins =

British theologian

Earl Collins formerly known as Gregory Collins (born 1960 in Belfast, Northern Ireland) is Canon Chancellor of Chichester Cathedral and was the sixth Abbot of the Abbey of the Dormition in Jerusalem.

== Studies and priestly ordination ==
Earl (Gregory) Collins studied Byzantine Studies and Scholastic Philosophy at Queen's University Belfast and the British School of Archaeology in Athens.

In 1989, Collins joined the Roman Catholic Benedictine religious community at Glenstal Abbey. In 1991, he received his doctorate in Byzantine Studies in Belfast and was a teacher in Nigeria. From 1992 to 1996 he taught at Glenstal Abbey School. He professed in 1994 and received priestly ordination in 1995. After studying depth psychology at the C. G. Jung Institute in Zurich, he became director of the Glenstal Abbey School in 1998.

== Leadership positions ==
From 2002 to 2008 Gregory Collins taught Orthodox Theology and History of Theology at the Pontifical Athenaeum of Sant'Anselmo in Rome. He was director of the Monastic Institute there from 2004 to 2008. He lectured at the Jerusalem Year of Theological Studies at the Dormitio and at the Salesian Ratisbonne Institute in Jerusalem. Since 2008 he has taught Byzantine Theology at the University of Limerick.

In 2011, Gregory Collins was elected abbot of the German-speaking Benedictine Abbey of Dormitio on Mount Zion in Jerusalem in an elective chapter in Jerusalem presided over by Abbot Primate Notker Wolf. He succeeded Benedikt Lindemann, who had held the office since 1995. On June 22, 2016, Gregory Collins announced that he would end his service as abbot on June 29, 2016, leaving Dormitio Abbey and returning to his professed monastery of Glenstal after a sabbatical period.

== Conversion to Anglicanism ==
Starting in 2018, Earl Collins served as a priest in the Anglican Diocese of Ely. Until September 2025 he was Vicar at St. John's, Palmeira Square in Hove.

As theology lecturer and Acting Vice Principal at Westcott House theological college, the Anglican Diocese of Chichester reported that "he has greatly enjoyed preparing female and male ordinands for ordained ministry." In February 2021, he held a lecture titled "Modern Approaches to the Eucharist: Beyond Catholic and Protestant."

On 12 October 2025 he was installed as Canon Chancellor at Chichester Cathedral.

He is married to James McMahon.

== Publications ==
- Collins, Gregory (2002). The Glenstal Book of Icons : praying with the Glenstal Icons. Blackrock, Co. Dublin: Columba Press. ISBN 1-85607-362-9. OCLC 59371216.
- Collins, Gregory (2003). Come and receive light : meditations for ministers of Christ. Blackrock, Co. Dublin: Columba Press. ISBN 1-85607-399-8. OCLC 53315752.
- Collins, Gregory (2010). Meeting Christ in His mysteries : a Benedictine vision of the spiritual life. Collegeville, Minn.: Liturgical Press. ISBN 978-0-8146-3372-4. OCLC 681481620.
