= Zawgyi font =

Non-Unicode-compatible Burmese typeface

Zawgyi
- Foundry: Arthouse (Mandalay)
- Date released: 4 December 2007

The Zawgyi font (Note: The first version of the typeface is known as Zawgyi-One or zawgyi1) is a predominant typeface used for Burmese language text on websites. It supports the Burmese script using its Myanmar Unicode block following a non-compliant implementation. Prior to 2019, it was the most popular font on Burmese websites.

== Unicode incompatibility ==
Encoding formats of ကြော့ in Zawgyi (top) and Unicode (bottom). In normal Unicode rendering, the codepoint sequence on the top renders as ေၾကာ့ instead.

The Burmese script is a complex text layout script, whereby the positions and shapes of its graphemes vary based on context. The support for complex text rendering for personal computers did not arrive until Windows XP Service Pack 2 in 2004, and a Burmese font utilizing this technology did not exist until 2005. Furthermore, there were significant revisions in Unicode's implementation of Burmese script up until Unicode 5.1 in 2008. Compounding the fact that Myanmar experienced sanctions from the West, this had resulted in much of the Burmese localization technology being developed locally without external cooperation.

Numerous attempts at creating fonts with Burmese support were made in the 2000s, but they were developed as Unicode fonts that were only partially Unicode compliant. Some of the codepoints for Burmese script were implemented as specified in Unicode, but others were not. Therefore, these fonts became incompatible with Unicode. This is referred to as ad hoc font encodings by the Unicode Consortium. With the advent of mobile phones, manufacturers such as Samsung and Huawei simply replaced the Unicode compliant Burmese system fonts with their Zawgyi equivalents.

There are significant shortcomings in using ad hoc font encodings. As a separate encoding, the situation leads to garbled text being shown between users of Zawgyi and Unicode. Because the Zawgyi font encoding was not implemented as efficiently as specified in Unicode, it had to occupy more codepoints than what is allocated for Burmese. As such, Zawgyi encoding took over the Unicode block reserved for minority languages of Myanmar. In Zawgyi, the same word can be encoded in multiple different ways, making Zawgyi text corpus difficult to search and analyze. It is also difficult to sort Zawgyi text. In addition, using Unicode would ease the implementation of natural language processing technologies.

The Myanmar government designated 1 October 2019 as "U-Day" to officially switch to Unicode. The full transition was expected by some to take two years, but has now been somewhat complicated by the effects of the 2021 Myanmar coup d'état.

Unicode uses the private-use script code Qaag to mark text written in Zawgyi.

=== Conversion ===
International Components for Unicode supports conversion of Zawgyi-encoded data to conformant Unicode by means of the Zawgyi-my transliterator.
