= Hulme =

Area of Manchester, England

Coordinates: 53.4636°N 2.25°W

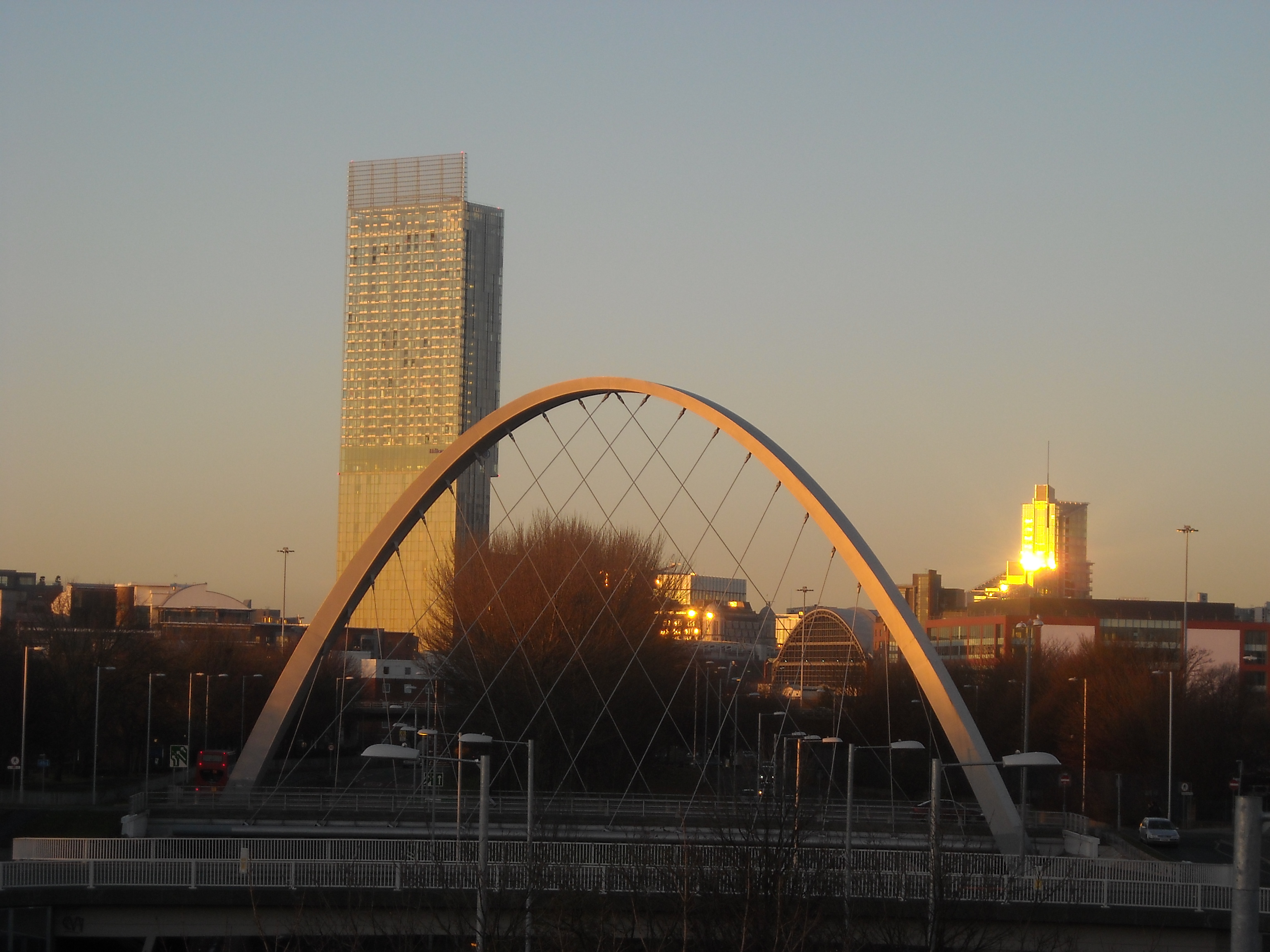
- The Hulme Arch Bridge, with the Beetham Tower in the background, 2008

- Location within Greater Manchester
- Area: 2.204 km^{2} (0.851 sq mi)
- Population: 16,907 (2011 Census)
  - Density: 7,671/km^{2} (19,870/sq mi)
- OS grid reference: SJ834963
  - London: 160 mi (260 km) S
- Metropolitan borough: Manchester
- Metropolitan county: Greater Manchester
- Region: North West
- Country: England
- Sovereign state: United Kingdom
- Post town: MANCHESTER
- Postcode district: M15
- Dialling code: 0161
- Police: Greater Manchester
- Fire: Greater Manchester
- Ambulance: North West
- UK Parliament: Manchester Central
- Councillors: Bernard Ekbery (Green); Annette Wright (Labour); Lee Glover (Labour)

Hulme (/hjuːm/) is an inner city area and electoral ward of Manchester, in Greater Manchester, England, immediately south of Manchester city centre. It has a significant industrial heritage.

Historically in Lancashire, the name Hulme is derived from the Old Norse word for a small island, or land surrounded by water or marsh, indicating that it may have been first settled by Norse invaders in the period of the Danelaw.

== History ==
Hulme was formerly a township in the parish of Manchester, in 1866 Hulme became a separate civil parish, on 26 March 1896 the parish was abolished to form South Manchester. In 1891 the parish had a population of 7,196.

=== Toponymy ===
Hulme derives its name from the Old Norse holmr, holmi, through Old Danish hulm or hulme meaning small islands or land surrounded by streams, fen or marsh. The area may have fitted this description at the time of the Scandinavian invasion and settlement as it is surrounded by water on three sides by the rivers Irwell, Medlock and Corn Brook. Ekwall suggested that the considerable number of Danish names to the south and south-west of Manchester, unparalleled in the rest of Lancashire, pointed to a Danish colony on the north bank of the Mersey.

=== Early history ===
Ouerholm and Noranholm were recorded in 1226 and Norholm in 1227. These are thought to be variations of Overhulm and Netherhulm, although recorded earlier.

The surname de Hulm is known from records of 1246, 1273, 1277, 1285, 1332 and 1339 and del Hulme from 1284. There are other early Hulm(e)s/Holm(e)s from which they might have received their surnames (by Warrington and Lancaster, for example).

In 1310 there is a mention of "the manor of Hulm with the appurtenances, near Mamcestre".

In 1322 in the records of rents of the lands of the recently executed enemy of the King and rebel Thomas, Earl of Lancaster, the following are mentioned as in the Wapentake of Salfordshire:

"Geoffrey de Hulme holds half a ploughland in Hulme and renders yearly 5s[hillings]." or, in an alternate version: "Geoffrey de Hulme holds one ploughland in Hulme by the service of 5s. yearly at the 4 terms for all." and "John le Ware holds one ploughland in Hulme by the service of 5s. yearly at the 4 terms." In 1324 there is a record of "... ; farm of the land of Geoffrey de Hulme in Hulme which Jordan the dean formerly held in Overhulm and Netherhulm 5s ; ..."

In 1440 there is a mention of the manor of Hulme and land exchanged for 200 pounds of silver: "Between William de Byrom, Henry de Par and John Hepe, late of Hulme, plaintiffs, and Ralph de Prestwich, deforciant of the manor of Hulme with the appurtenances, and of 9 messuages, 300 acres of land, 100 acres of meadow, 500 acres of pasture, and 100 acres of wood in Mamcestre, Crompton and Oldom.

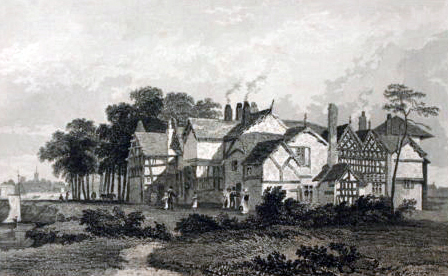
Hulme Hall c.1830

Hulme was evidenced as a separate community south of the River Medlock from Manchester in 15th century map prints. Christopher Saxton included Holme in his map of Lancashire of 1577 on the south banks of the Medlock and the Irwell where they joined. Trafford was placed on the south bank of the Irwell to the south-west, Wordsall across the Irwell to the north-west and Manchester across the Medlock to the north. Hulme Hall was close to the River Irwell on a site near where St George's Church was later built, and the Hulme Barracks were built in 1799.

Until the 18th century the area remained agricultural, and pictures from the time show an idyllic scene of crops, sunshine and country life. The area remained entirely rural until the Bridgewater Canal was cut and the Industrial Revolution swept economic change through the neighbouring district of Castlefield where the Duke of Bridgewater's canal terminated, and containerised transportation of coal and goods rose as an industry to support the growing textile industries of Manchester. It was this supply of cheap coal from the Duke's mines at Worsley that allowed the textile industry of Manchester to grow.

=== Industrial Revolution ===
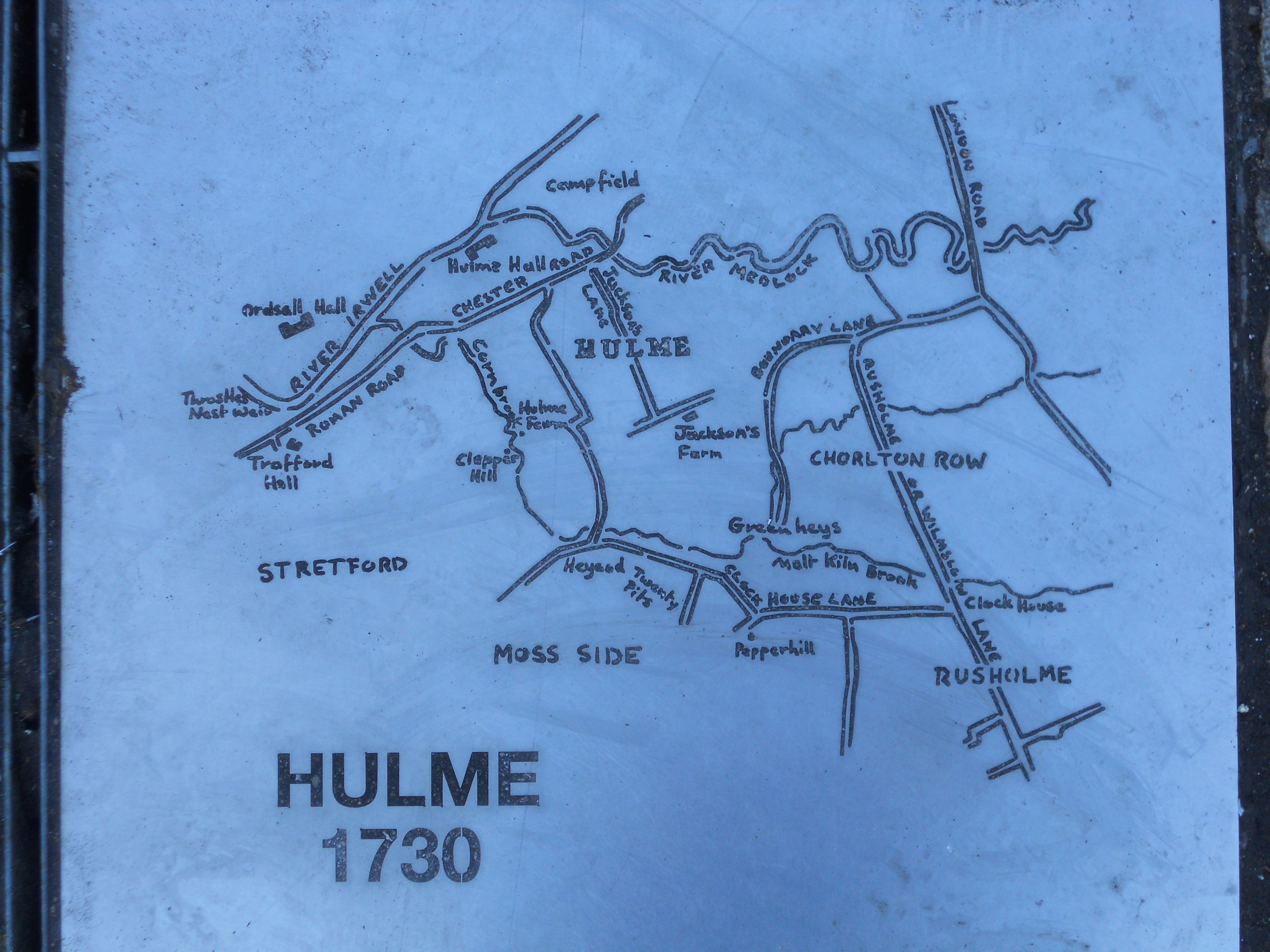
Hulme map 1730, reproduced in A Hulme People's History in Hulme Park

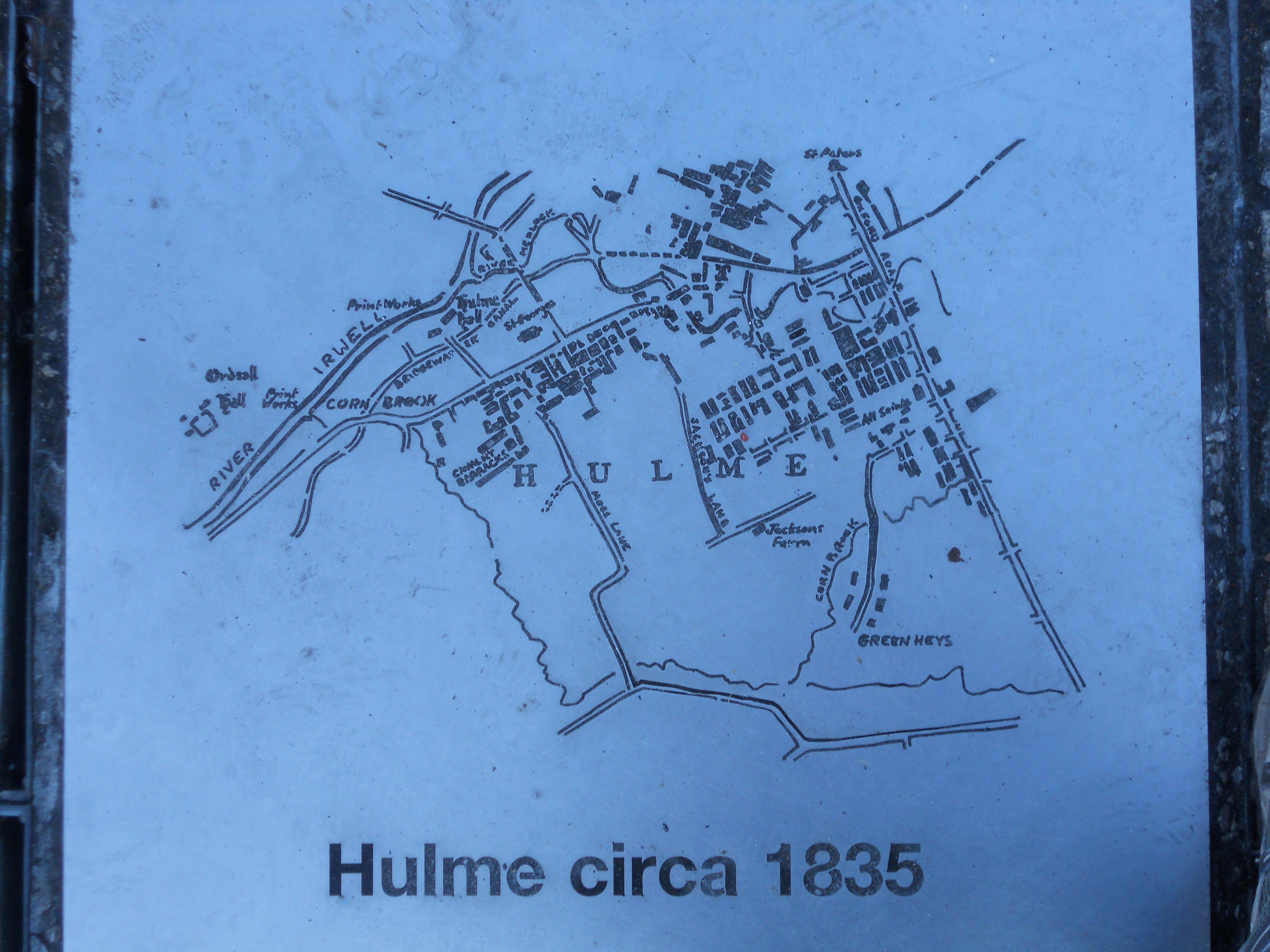
Hulme map 1835, reproduced in A Hulme People's History in Hulme Park

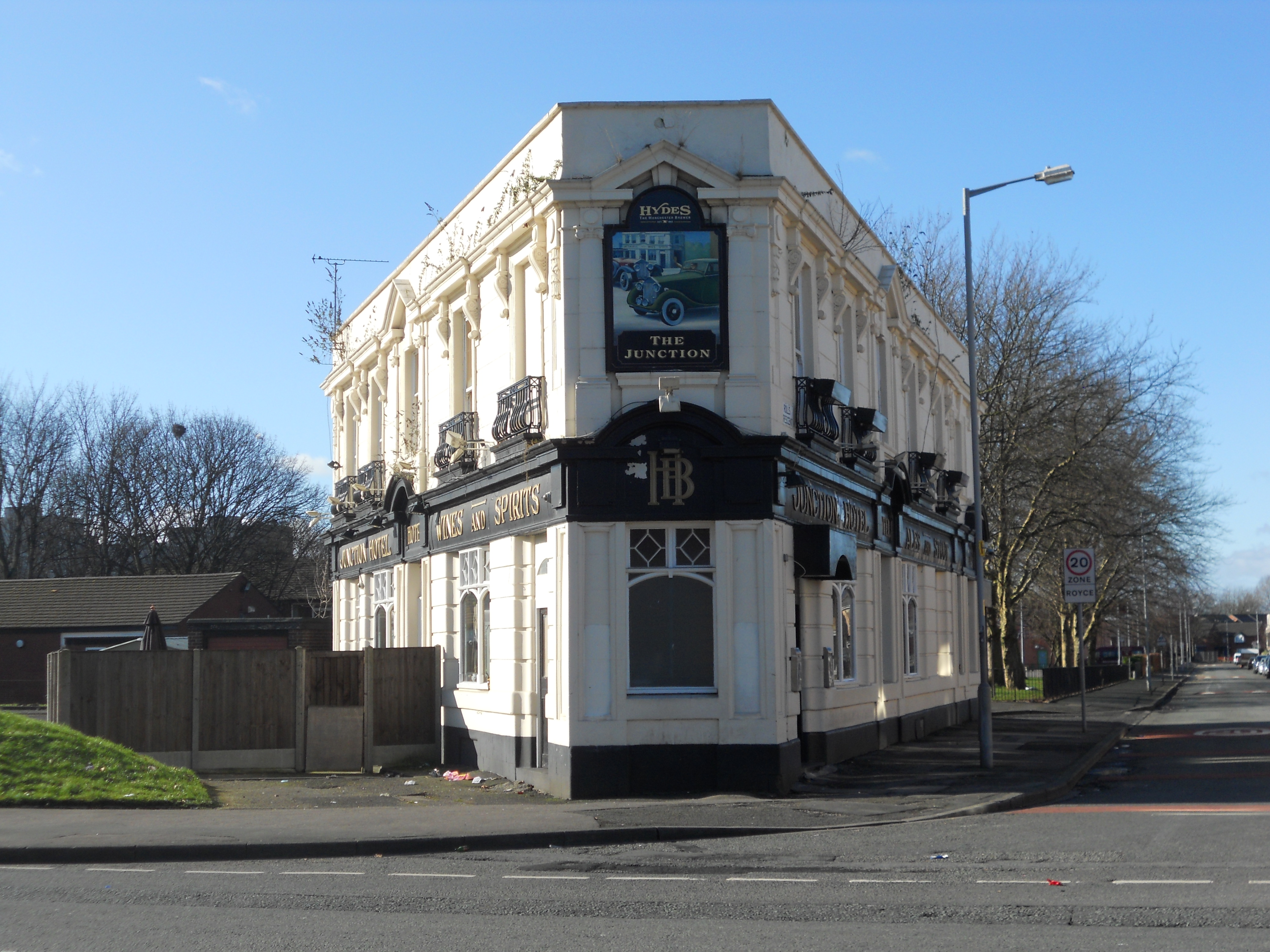
(Grand) Junction Hotel, Rolls Crescent

The Industrial Revolution brought development to the area, and jobs to the poor, carrying coal from the 'starvationers' (very narrow canal boats), to be carted off along Deansgate.

Many cotton mills and railway links to Hulme soon followed, with the town served by the Mid-Cheshire line railway and the Manchester, South Junction and Altrincham Railway, as well as the Manchester Carriage and Tramways Company. Thousands of people came to work in the rapidly expanding mills in the city. The number of people living in Hulme multiplied 50-fold during the first half of the 19th century. Housing had to be built rapidly, and space was limited, which resulted in low-quality housing interspersed with the myriad smoking chimneys of the mills and the railway. Reports of the time suggest that at times the air quality became so poor that poisonous fumes and smoke literally "blocked out the sun" for long periods.

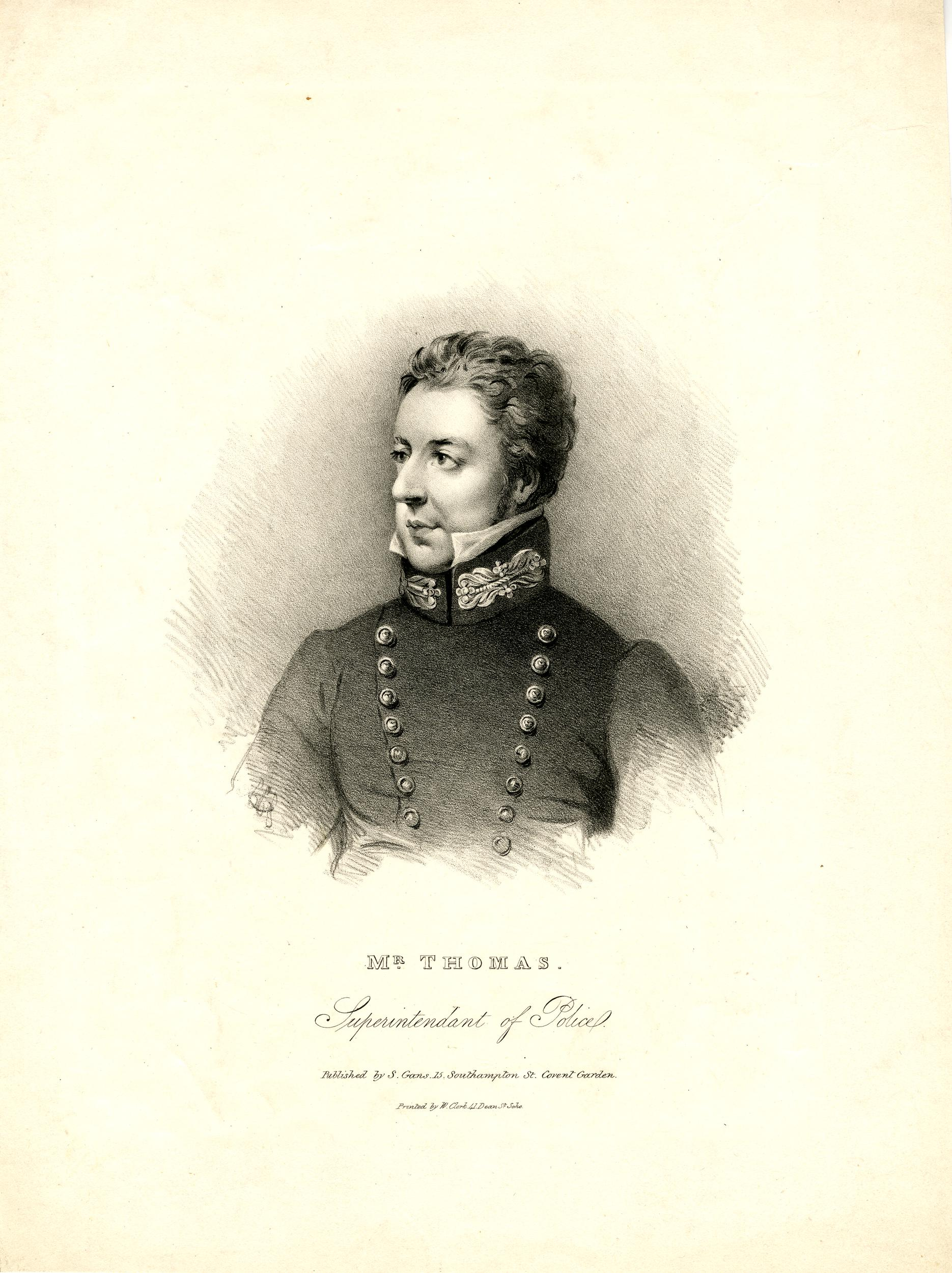
Thomas in his previous role as Superintendent with the Metropolitan Police.

In the Irish Poor Report of 1836 the Deputy Constable of the Township of Manchester, Joseph Sadler Thomas, found that the Irish were so fiercely neighbourly in Little Ireland (located on the other side of the River Medlock, just north of Hulme Ward) and the larger Irish area of Angel Meadow (north-east of Victoria Station, on the other side of central Manchester from Hulme) that: "if a legal execution of any kind is to be made, either for rent or debt, or for taxes, the officer who serves the process almost always applies to me for assistance to protect him; and, in affording that protection, my officers are often maltreated by brickbats and other missiles".

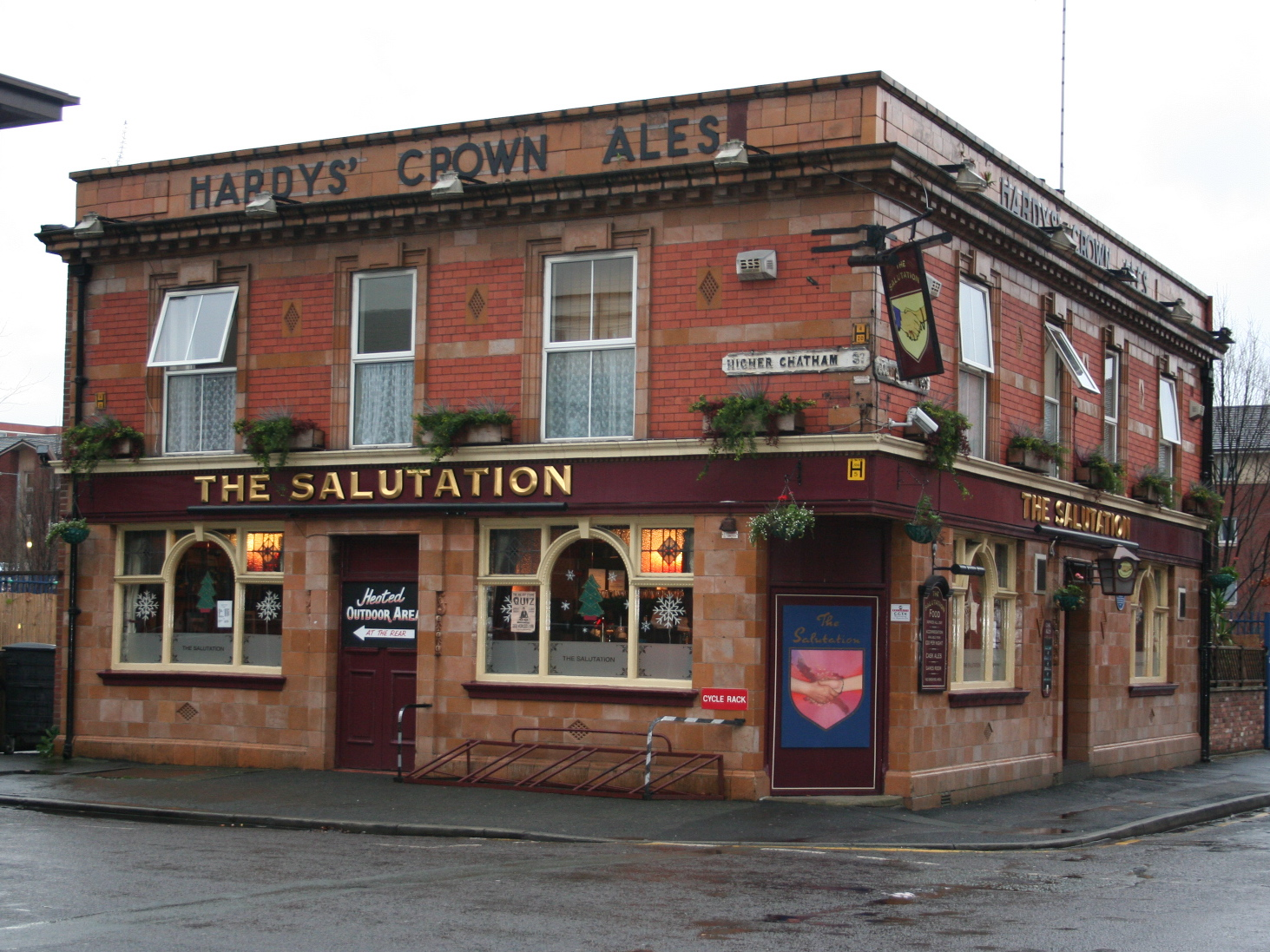
The Salutation pub on Higher Chatham Street, where Charlotte Brontë began to write Jane Eyre; the pub was a lodge in the 1840s

Hulme Hall was demolished in 1840 with the construction of the Bridgewater Canal. By 1844, the situation had grown so serious that Manchester Borough Council had to pass a law banning further building. However, the thousands of "slum" homes that were already built continued to be lived in, and many were still in use into the first half of the 20th century.

Friedrich Engels was the heir of a German cotton manufacturer who had come to work for the Ermen & Engels factory in Weaste, Salford, three miles (five kilometres) from Hulme though he worked in the firm's offices in Manchester. He made Little Ireland infamous throughout the world as a disastrous slum despite it being relatively short-lived (a little over 30 years) and other areas of Manchester having worse housing, poverty and disease. Little Ireland was a small slum between Oxford Road, the Medlock and the railway serving Oxford Road Station, mainly inhabited by Irish immigrant workers. Described at length by Engels, he estimated that there was one inaccessible privy for every 120 residents. "The cottages are old, dirty and of the smallest sort, the streets uneven, fallen into ruts and in part without drains or pavement; masses of refuse, offal and sickening filth lie among standing pools in all directions; the atmosphere is poisoned by the effluvia from these, and laden and darkened by the smoke of a dozen tall factory chimneys. A horde of ragged women and children swarm about here, as filthy as the swine that thrive upon the garbage heaps and in the puddles." Reinforcement of the Medlock to protect the factories raised the level of the river above the surrounding residential hovels leading to frequent flooding with filthy river water. Hulme was also described by Engels: "the more thickly built-up regions chiefly bad and approaching ruin, the less populous of more modern structure, but generally sunk in filth."

Large numbers of Irish immigrants settled in Hulme, and in various other districts of Manchester.

The Tithe award for Hulme was made in 1854. In 1863 members of the Hulme Athenaeum club for working men established an association football club, believed to be the earliest example in the city and in the county of Lancashire. Records of association games in the 1860s and 1870s exist with the club surviving into the early 1870s.

In the 1860s, as Hulme became more established, new facilities sprang up. Municipal buildings were developed on Stretford Road, including the Town Hall, baths and public library, and Chorlton Union Workhouse on Leaf Street. The former Turville Public House, on the corner of Ellesmere Street, dates from c1870.

The foundation stone of the first school erected by the Manchester School Board was laid in Vine Street, Hulme, on 11 June 1874 by Herbert Birley, chairman of the board, and the school was opened on 9 August 1875. Other board schools in Hulme were at Hamer Street (1872), Zion Chapel (1875), Lloyd Street (1878), Mulberry Street (1881), Upper Jackson Street (1883), Bangor Street (1886) and Duke Street (1890). The temperance hall in Hulme, in 1880, hosted a fancy dress ball, where all the 47 attendees were men, but 22 of them came dressed as women. The attendees were later arrested and put on trial accused of soliciting sex with other men.

In 1913 it was said "It is probable that in no northern city is the divergence between classes so marked as it is becoming in Manchester. Among the 80,000 inhabitants, for example, of Hulme, the poorest and most neglected district of the city, is to be found only a tiny minority of persons of much education and refinement, these being with rare exceptions doctors, or ministers of the various religious denominations, and their wives"

In the early 20th century transport in Hulme was improved when the existing horse-drawn omnibus services were replaced by electric trams. These services connected Hulme with the suburbs further south, Moss Side, Whalley Range and Chorlton-cum-Hardy. Boston Street and Preston Street carried complementary single lines of track southwards from Jackson Street. From 1949 the tram services were withdrawn and replaced by the motorbuses of Manchester Corporation Transport.

=== Hulme Hippodrome (1901), The Playhouse (1902) ===
Two existing conjoined theatres were built in Hulme, the Hulme Hippodrome and The Playhouse, opening in 1901 and 1902 respectively. The Playhouse was later used as a BBC studio for 30 years (1955-1986) and for a short time opened as the Nia Centre (1991-1997) but closed due to financial problems. It currently is run by Niamos CIC. Hulme Hippodrome was a variety theatre until 1960, then as a bingo hall followed by being a social club and snooker hall until 1988. After being dark for 15 years it was purchased by the controversial religious charity, Gilbert Deya Ministries in 2003. It was sold to a property developer in November 2020 and is currently shuttered and in poor repair. A campaign group exists, Save Hulme Hippodrome. Both theatres are Grade II listed buildings. Recent research in the BBC written files archives has shown Hulme Hippodrome was hired as a venue in 1950-1955 on Sunday afternoons to record around 20 radio show titles, including Morecambe & Wise's first series, You're Only Young Once.

=== Post-war Housing ===
Hulme had been heavily bombed during World War II and the majority of its housing was privately owned Victorian terraces, most of which were declared unfit and demolished during a rapid slum clearance policy, in Hulme there was resistance to building tower blocks and this led to the building of the mid-rise deck access flats of a "modular" living design. Hulme in the 1960s was an era of "socialist, post-war spirit - reflected across health, education and worker rights". The modernist and brutalist architectural style of the period, as well as practicalities of speed and cost of construction led to building what became known as the "cities in the sky".

In Hulme, a new and (at the time) innovative design for deck access and tower living was attempted with four blocks, designed for families. This consisted of curved rows of low-rise flats with deck access far above the streets, known as the Hulme Crescents, designed to house 13,000. In this arrangement, vehicles remained on ground level with pedestrians on concrete walkways overhead, above the smoke and fumes of the street. People living in the new post war council homes were, within a decade treated as second class citizens.

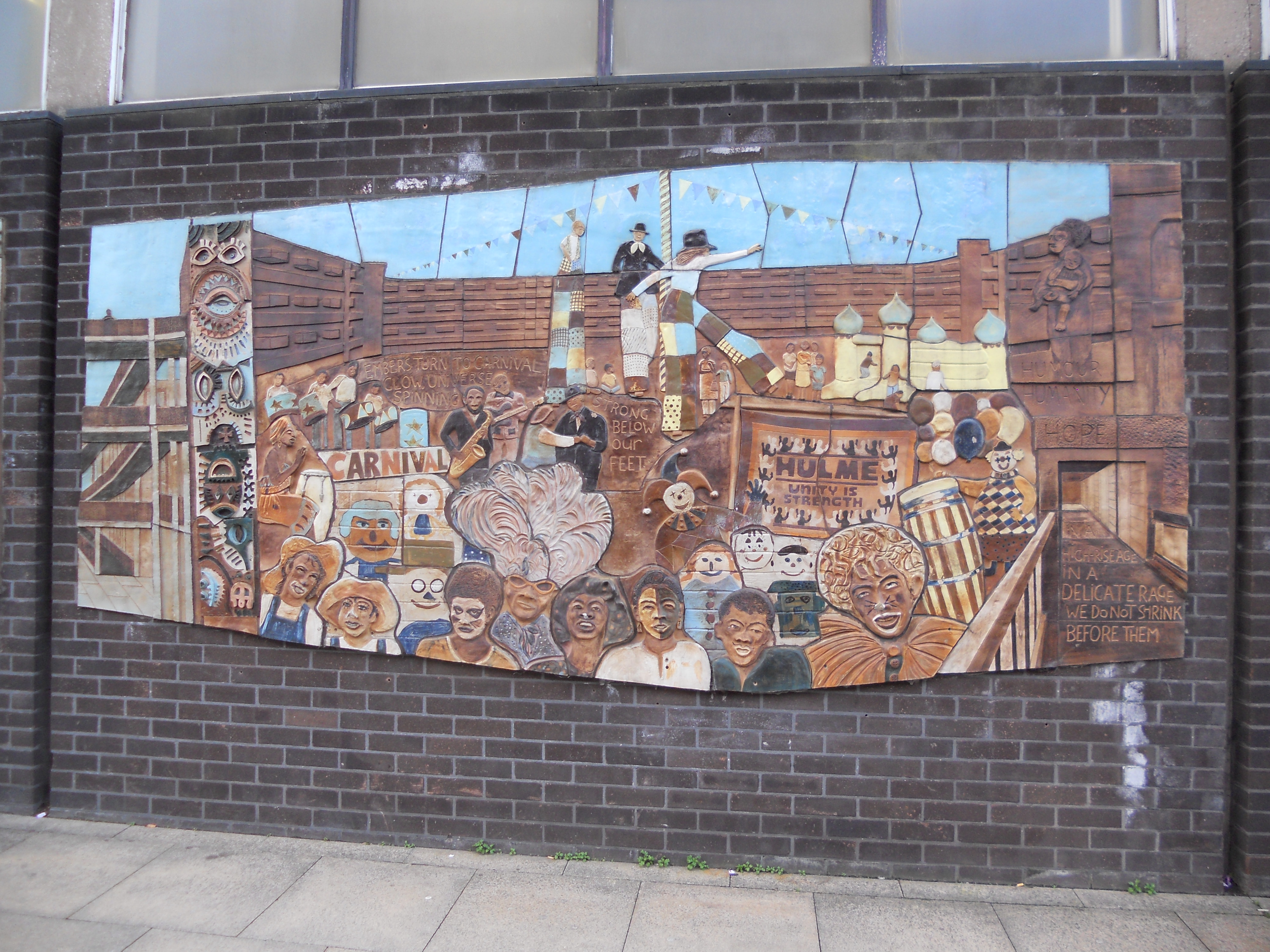
Hulme Library mural detail, showing a Hulme Carnival in Charles Barry Crescent

High-density housing was balanced with large green spaces and trees below, and the pedestrian had priority on the ground over cars. The 1960s redevelopment of Hulme split the area's new council housing into a number of sections. Hulme 2 was the area between Jackson Crescent and Royce Road. Hulme 3 was between Princess Road and Boundary Road based along the pedestrianised Epping Walk, Hulme 4 was between Princess Road and Royce Road and Hulme 5 - the "Crescents" themselves were between Royce Road and Rolls Crescent. The names of the "Crescents" harked back to the Georgian era, being named after architects of that time: Robert Adam Crescent, Charles Barry Crescent, William Kent Crescent and John Nash Crescent, together with Hawksmoor Close (a small straight block of similar design attached to Charles Barry Crescent). At the time, the "Crescents" won several design awards. They were also popular because they were some of the first council homes in Manchester to have central heating. The development even had some notable first occupants, such as Nico and Alain Delon.

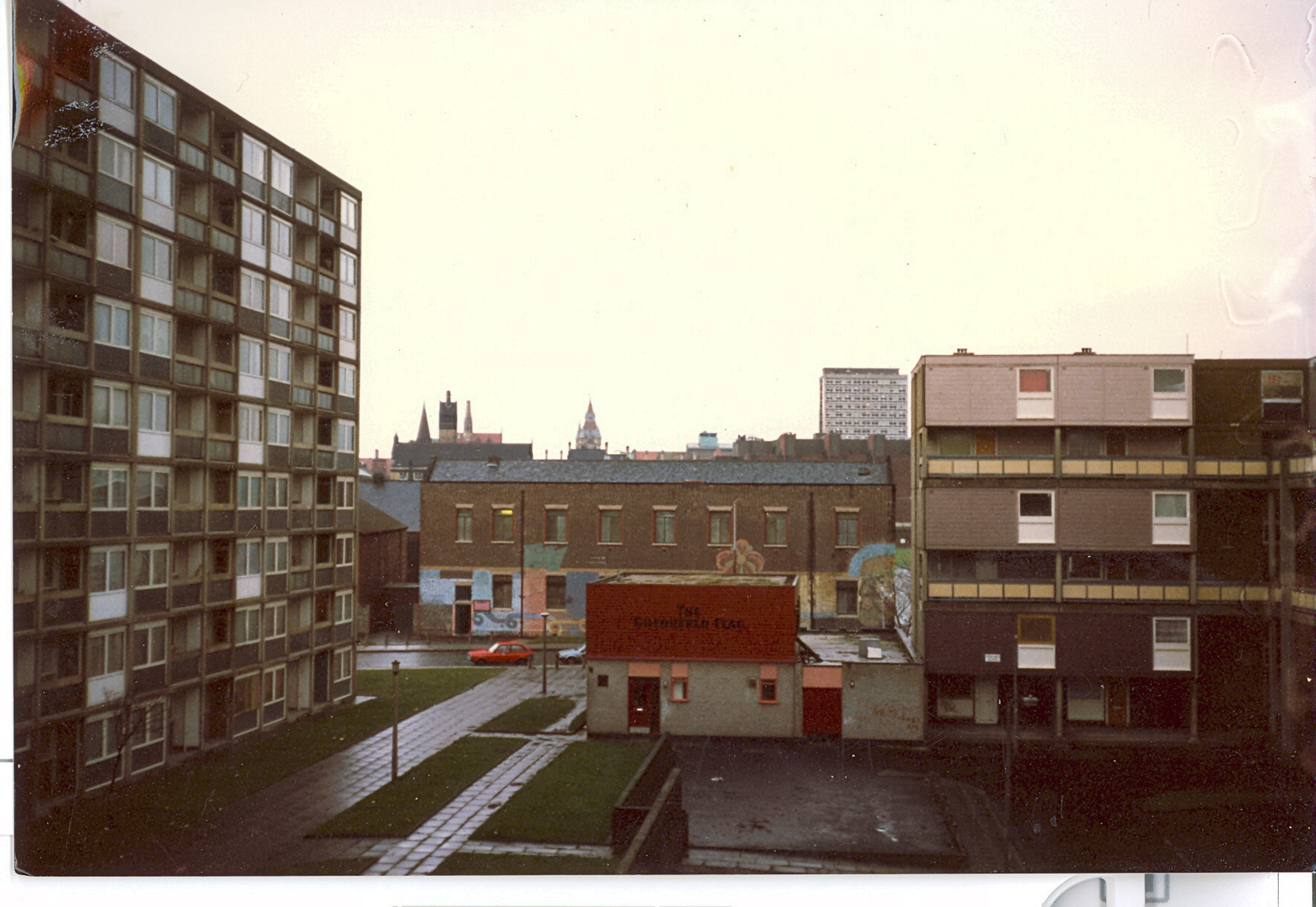
Chequered Flag, Hulme, Manchester

However, what eventually turned out to be recognised as poor design, workmanship and maintenance meant that the crescents introduced their own problems. Design flaws and unreliable 'system build' construction methods, as well as the 1970s oil crisis meant that heating the poorly insulated homes became too expensive for their low income residents, and the crescents soon became notorious for being cold, damp and riddled with cockroaches and other vermin. Crime and drug abuse became significant problems in Hulme, as police did not patrol the long, often dark decks, due to the fact that they were not officially considered streets. The decks made muggings and burglary relatively easy, as any crime could be carried out in almost total privacy, with no hope for quick assistance from police below.

The crescents became troublesome very shortly after their construction—within a decade, they were declared 'unfit for purpose', and several plans were drawn up that suggested various differing types of renovation and renewal for the blocks, including splitting the buildings into smaller, more manageable structures by removing sections. By 1984 the City Council, then landlord abandoned the Crescents entirely after which they became notorious. In the 1980s and 1990s many of these vacant deck-access flats were squatted and the area acquired a 'bohemian' reputation for its many punks, artists and musicians.

During the late 1980s Viraj Mendis, an asylum seeker from Sri Lanka, sought the right of sanctuary in the Church of the Ascension in Hulme and remained there until arrested in January 1989. (For further information, see below, Religion; Church of England)

==== Hulme in the 1990s and after ====
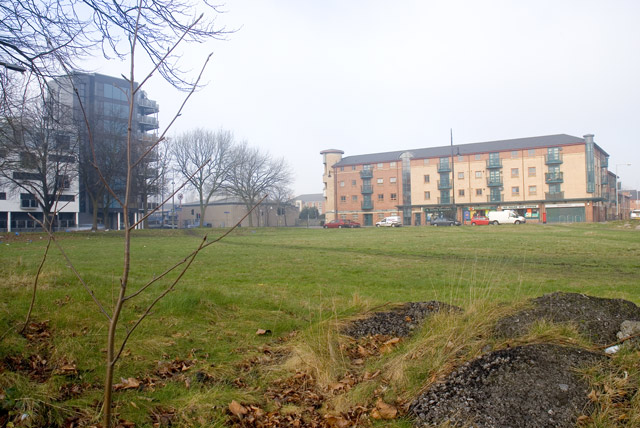
Stretford Road, Hulme: (from left) block of flats and Church of the Ascension in Royce Road, building with shops and other facilities in Stretford Road

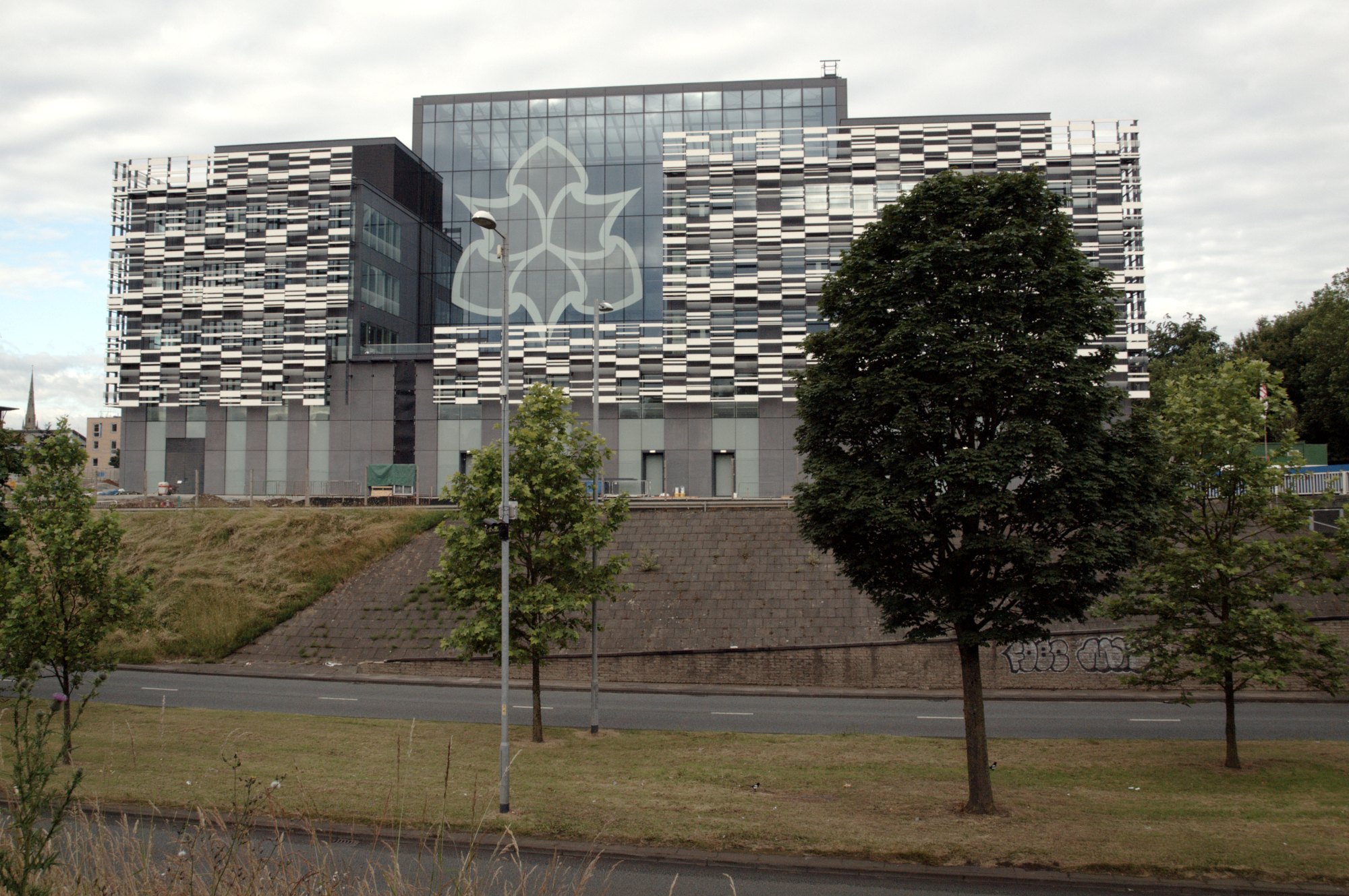
Birley Fields campus

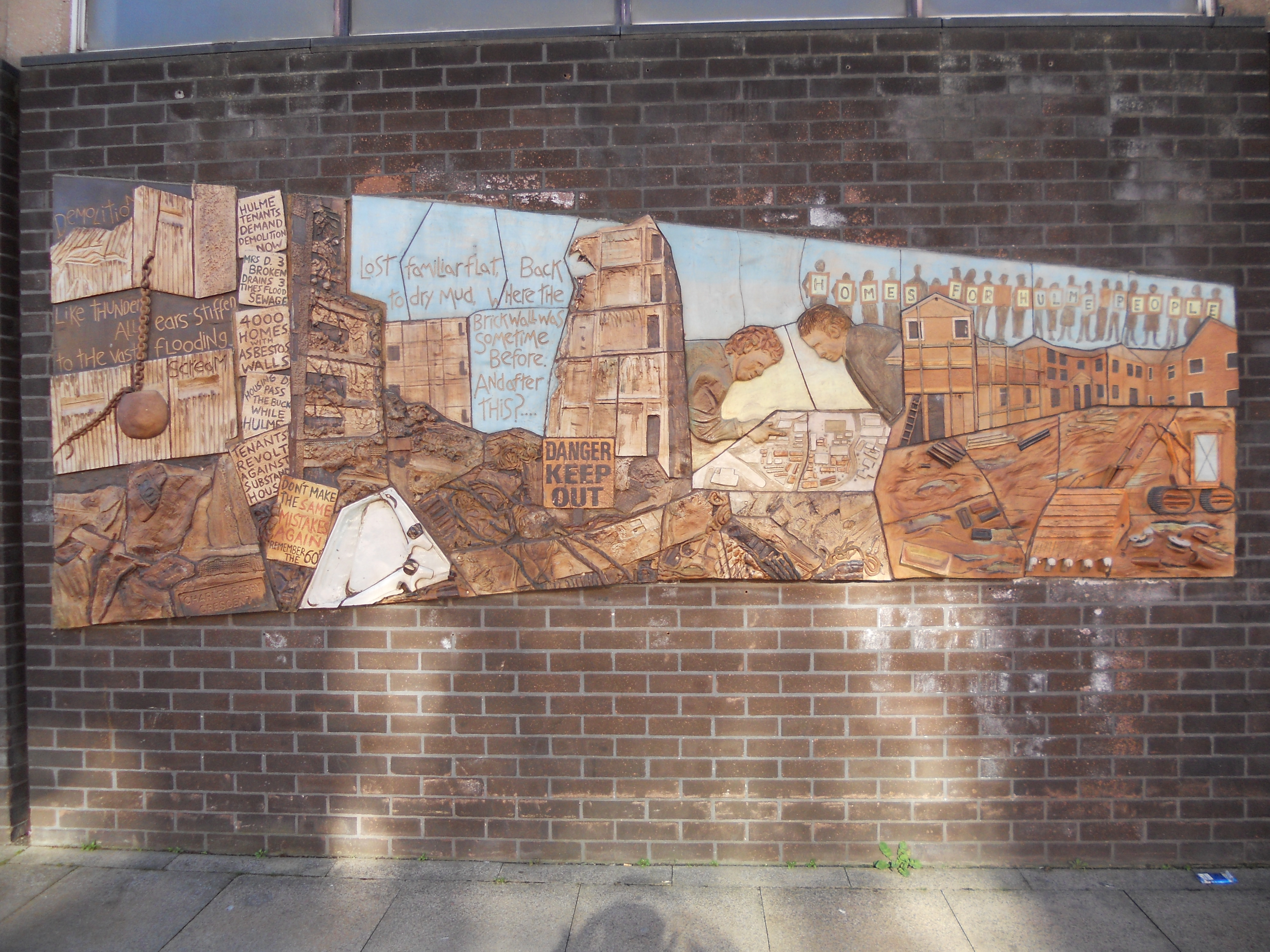
Hulme Library mural detail, demolition of many old flats and rebuilding with some resident input

The decision was made in the early 1990s to demolish Hulme's crescent blocks and replace them with low-rise flats and houses. The total amount of public and private money spent on improving Hulme and neighbouring Moss Side between 1990 and 2002 has exceeded £400 million. The area by then had become popular and desirable, containing a mix of council and privately owned housing.

==== Birley Fields ====
One part of Hulme, the Birley Fields (site of the former Birley High School, Chichester Road) has been partly developed for a series of office blocks and partly left as green urban waste land. The blocks house companies such as Michelin and Laing O'Rourke as well as the University of Manchester/IFL/Server Hotel data centre. The development site was the subject of a campaign by a group of Hulme residents which delayed the clearance of the site and the felling of a large tree. The "Birley Tree" was a 110-year-old Black Poplar.

In 2009, Manchester Metropolitan University announced plans for the redevelopment of Birley Fields as the site of a new £120 million campus. The proposed scheme, relocating the Faculties of Education and Health, would include new academic buildings, student accommodation for approximately 1,200 students, car parking and a community square. Work was due to start in 2011 but failed to do so. In March 2012 enabling works for this project (now estimated to cost £130 million) began. On completion the academic building is going to be open 24 hours each day and have facilities for the public as well as provision for the university. It is expected to have a marked effect on the local economy by providing more jobs.

==== Asbestos ====
A legacy of Hulme's post war council housing has been through the deadly effects of asbestos dust. John Shiers, a campaigner and later a leading figure in Save The Children had moved to council housing in Hulme in the late 1970s, where he discovered he and thousands of his neighbours council properties were riddled with asbestos. He had been one of the first to speak out about the asbestos in the properties, he campaigned for change and was a founding member of the Hulme Asbestos Action Group. He died in 2011 of mesothelioma, a type of cancer associated with asbestos. Manchester City Council admitted limited liability for his death in their role as his landlord. During a Parliamentary asbestos seminar, it was estimated that nationally the deaths between 1968 and 2008 had exceeded 110,000.

==== Redevelopment ====
The reputation for anti-social activity that Hulme acquired in the 1970s and 1980s has declined. The counterculture that the area fostered toward the 1990s survived the redevelopment and is evident in, for example, Hulme Community Garden Centre, a not-for-profit organisation underpinned by organic principles promoting, among other things, sustainability and urban gardening and food production, and Work for Change, a large complex of cooperatives containing artists, theatre, and a variety of NGOs.

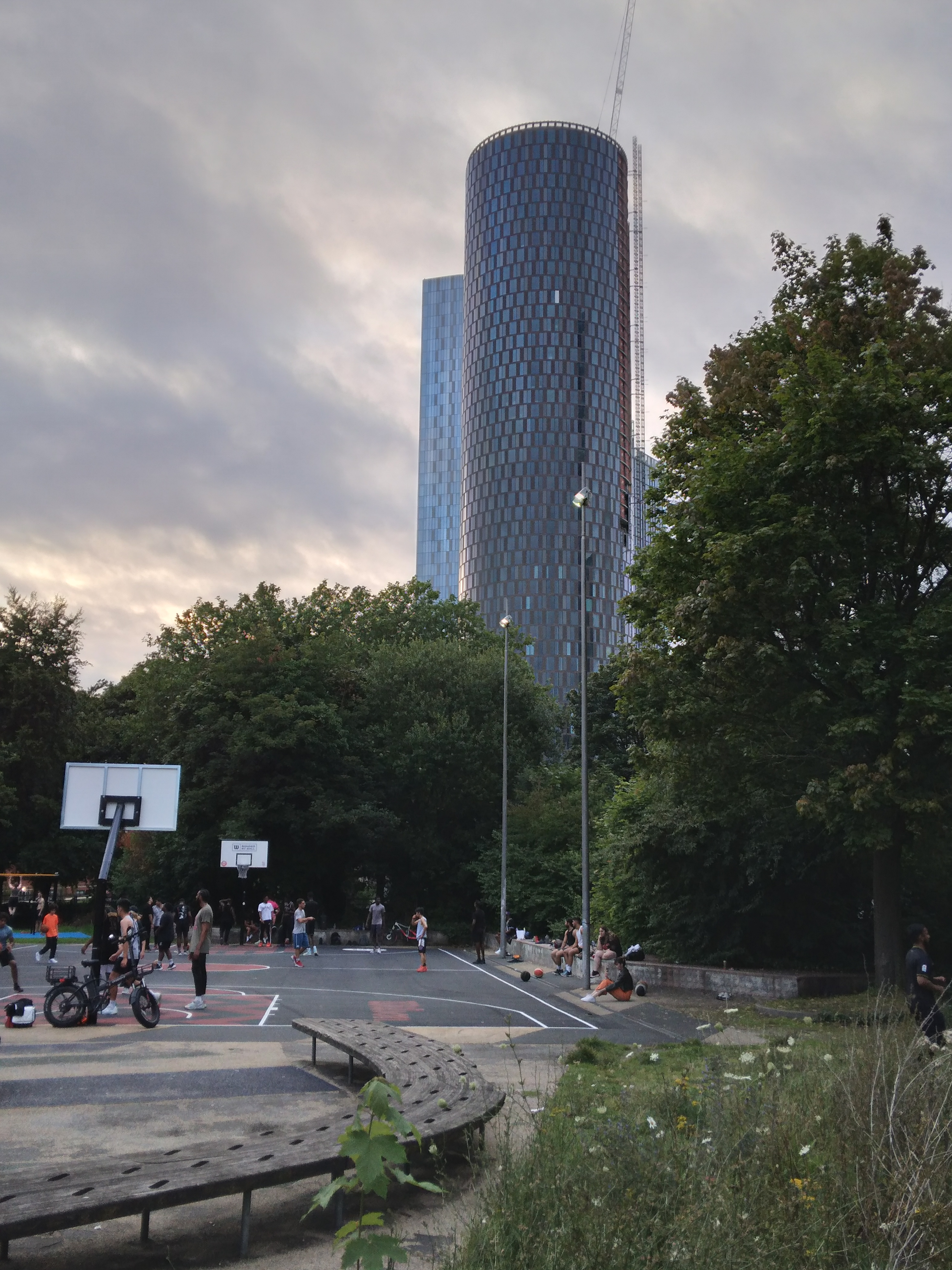
Young people playing basketball in Hulme Park, August 2023. The towers of The Blade and Three60 are visible in the background

Hulme's nearness to the city centre has meant that it has become a popular place to live for a new generation of city dwellers. The area is popular with young professionals who are attracted by apartment prices that are lower than in the city centre and yet within a 15-minute walk of the centre and the university campuses. Local amenities include the Zion Arts Centre, Hulme Community Garden Centre and Hulme Park. Shopping needs are catered for by the Hulme Shopping Centre, which includes an Asda supermarket and an indoor market.

In 2008, following a tenants' vote, the area's remaining council housing stock was transferred to the City South Housing Association along with that of several neighbouring areas.

== Governance ==
Hulme emerged in the Middle Ages as a township and chapelry, in the ecclesiastical parish of Manchester in the Salford Hundred in the historic county of Lancashire. Under the terms of the Poor Law Amendment Act 1834 Hulme was in Chorlton Poor Law Union which was established on 3 February 1837 until 1915 and in Manchester Poor Law Union from 1915 until 1930. From 1824 to 1845 commissioners had powers for the improvement of the area of the township, and it became part of the Borough of Manchester in 1838.

Hulme is a ward of the city of Manchester. The district is part of the Manchester Central parliamentary constituency, which is currently represented at Westminster by Lucy Powell MP.

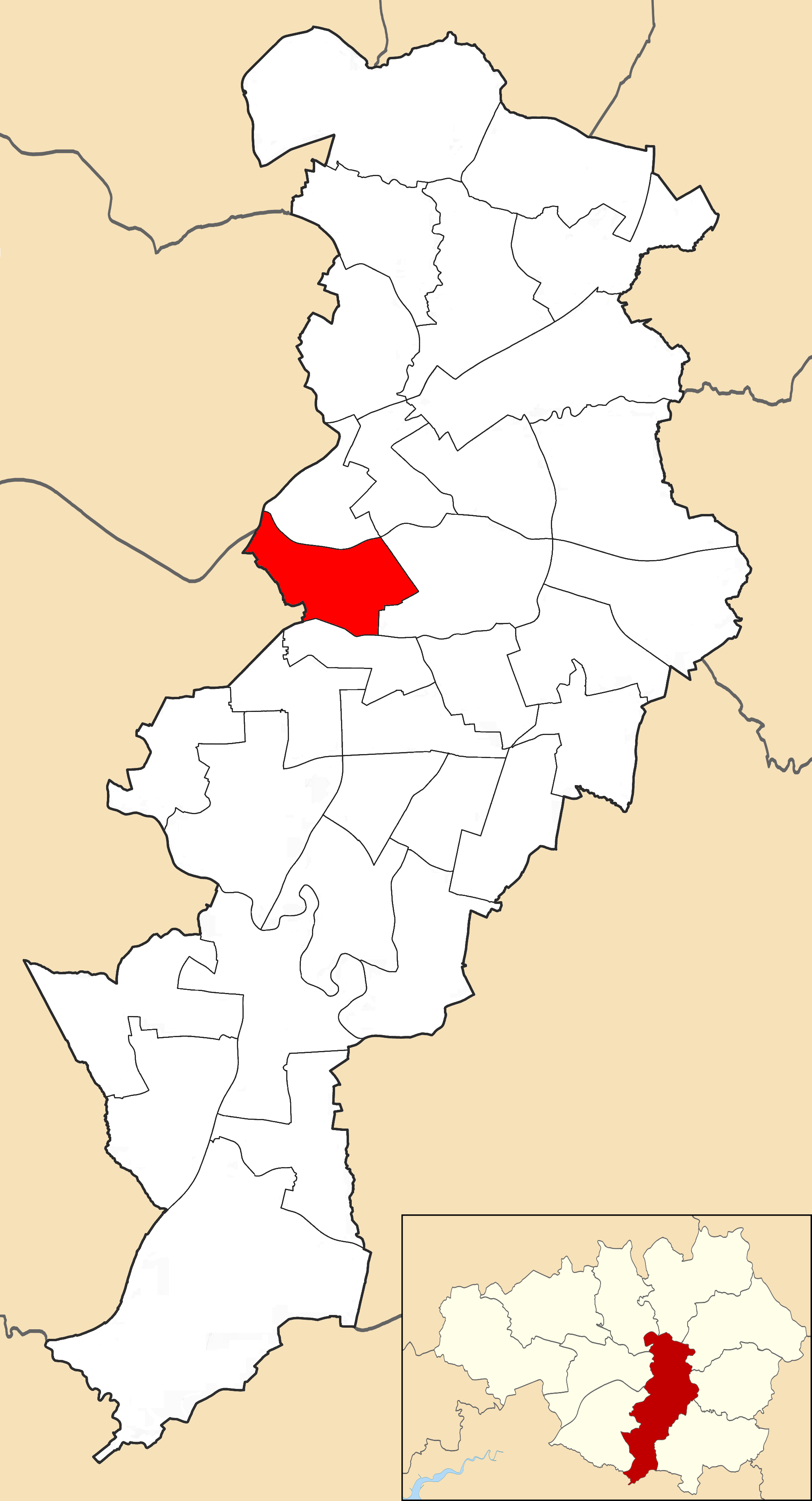
Hulme electoral ward within Manchester City Council.

=== Councillors ===
Hulme is currently represented on the City Council by councillors Annette Wright (Lab), Lee Glover (Lab) and Bernard Ekbery (Green). Nigel Murphy was de-selected by the Hulme constituency party before the postponed 2020 elections.

Election	Councillor	Councillor	Councillor
2018	Annette Wright (Lab)	Nigel Murphy (Lab)	Lee-Ann Igbon (Lab)
2019	Annette Wright (Lab)	Nigel Murphy (Lab)	Lee-Ann Igbon (Lab)
2021	Annette Wright (Lab)	Ekua Bayunu (Lab)	Lee-Ann Igbon (Lab)
May 2022	Annette Wright (Lab)	Ekua Bayunu (Lab)	Lee-Ann Igbon (Lab)
July 2022	Annette Wright (Lab)	Ekua Bayunu (Grn)	Lee-Ann Igbon (Lab)
2023	Annette Wright (Lab)	Ekua Bayunu (Grn)	Lee-Ann Igbon (Lab)
2024	Annette Wright (Lab)	Lee Glover (Lab)	Lee-Ann Igbon (Lab)
2026	Annette Wright (Lab)	Lee Glover (Lab)	Bernard Ekbery (Grn)

indicates seat up for re-election. indicates seat won in by-election. indicates councillor changed party.

== Geography ==
Hulme is south of Manchester city centre, beyond the River Medlock. The part of Hulme nearest to Old Trafford is known as Cornbrook from the Corn Brook, a tributary of the River Irwell. The area adjacent to Castlefield is known as St George's. This area is named after the Church of St George, Chester Road. The Bridgewater Canal passes through Hulme.

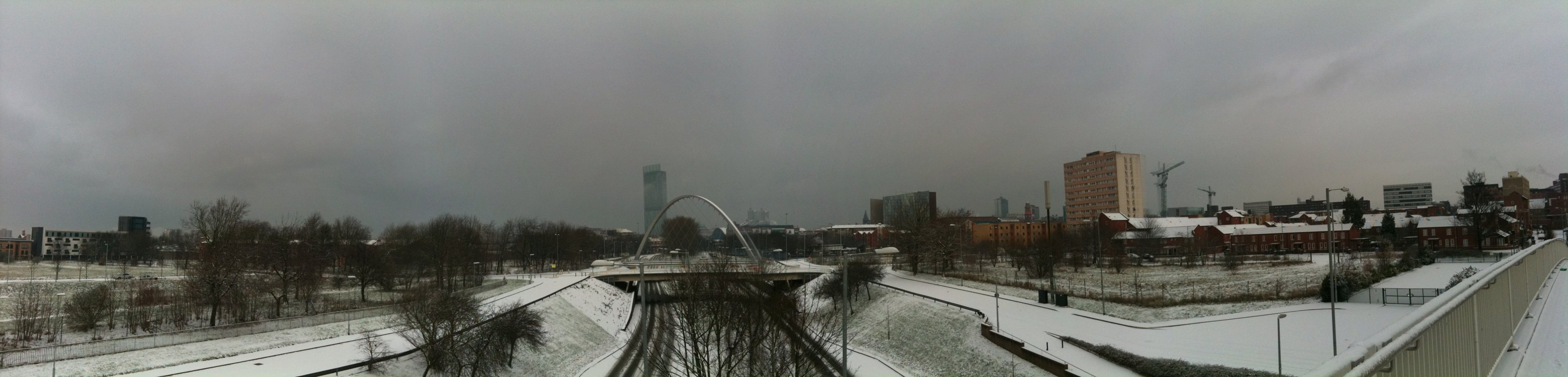
A panorama of Hulme, looking northwards towards Manchester city centre.

== Demography ==
Ethnic Group (UV09)	Hulme Ward	Percentage
All People	10449	100.00
White	7102	67.97
White: British	6037	57.78
White: Irish	346	3.31
White: Other White	719	6.88
Mixed	622	5.95
Mixed: White and Black Caribbean	276	2.64
Mixed: White and Black African	120	1.15
Mixed: White and Asian	86	0.82
Mixed: Other Mixed	140	1.34
Asian or Asian British	563	5.39
Asian or Asian British: Indian	206	1.97
Asian or Asian British: Pakistani	213	2.04
Asian or Asian British: Bangladeshi	36	0.34
Asian or Asian British: Other Asian	108	1.03
Black or Black British	1587	15.19
Black or Black British: Caribbean	836	8.00
Black or Black British: African	597	5.71
Black or Black British: Other Black	154	1.47
Chinese or Other Ethnic Group	575	5.50
Chinese or Other Ethnic Group: Chinese	373	3.57
Chinese or Other Ethnic Group: Other Ethnic Group	202	1.93

From the 2001 UK Census results, Office for National Statistics, Neighbourhood Statistics.

=== Historic population ===
In 1801 the population of Hulme was only 1677 but it was the largest of the townships surrounding Manchester. By 1831 it had increased to 9624 and then there was a greater increase to 26,982 by 1841 and roughly doubling again by 1851. The peak number was reached in 1871 when it was 74,731 and the next 30 years saw some decline to 66,916 in 1901.

== Religion ==
Church of England

The Church of St George, Chester Road, Hulme, a Commissioners' Church, was an Anglican church built to the designs of Francis Goodwin in 1826–27 and has a tall tower and a fine galleried interior. It was once the garrison church for the nearby barracks as well as being the parish church of Hulme and the graveyard has many interesting gravestones. The church was consecrated on 9 December 1828 by the Bishop of Chester, Dr John Bird Sumner, who later became Archbishop of Canterbury. The total cost of building St Georges was £20,000 of which sum Parliament, through the Church Commissioners paid nearly £15000 the rest was found by private donors and charitable bodies. The height of the tower to the top of its spires was 135 ft making it the highest in Manchester at the time. The first incumbent was Revd. Joshua Lingard M.A. After being derelict for many years it has been converted to residential use.

St Mary's Church, Chichester Road (architect J. S. Crowther, 1856–58) is another former Anglican church. It has a tall steeple and a lofty interior. This too has been converted into apartments.

The Church of the Ascension in Royce Road was built in 1970 as part of the redevelopment of Hulme. Other Anglican churches which no longer exist (in order of foundation) include: Holy Trinity, Stretford Road (1841); St Mark's, City Road; St Paul's, Stretford Road; St John the Baptist, Emden Street; St Philip's, Chester Street; St Michael's, Lavender Street; St Stephen's, City Road; and St Gabriel's, Erskine Street (1869).

The Bishop of Hulme was one of three suffragan bishops in the Diocese of Manchester from 1924 to 2009; the last Bishop of Hulme was Stephen Lowe.

In 1986 Viraj Mendis, a Sri Lankan, claimed the right of sanctuary at the Church of the Ascension. He was an active supporter of Sri Lanka Tamils and claimed danger of death if he was sent back to Sri Lanka. After a march to protest against deportation on 20 December 1986, he ran into the church and claimed the right of sanctuary. He stayed there for two years with the help of the rector John Methuen. The church became the focus of the "Viraj Mendis Defence Campaign". On 18 January 1989 police raided the church and arrested Mendis, which led to questions in the House of Commons. He was deported to Sri Lanka and his fears did not materialize.

Nonconformity

In Stretford Road the Zion Congregational Chapel was built in the 19th century and replaced in 1911 by the Stretford Road Congregational Church which is no longer a church and has been put to other uses as the Zion Institute and the Zion Arts Centre. The church was used for a performance by Luciano Pavarotti and the filming of a mass meeting for Warren Beatty's film Reds.

Other Nonconformist places of worship were the Ebenezer Methodist New Connexion Chapel, Boston Street, Cedar Street Wesleyan Mission, Christ Church Bible Christian Chapel, George Street Wesleyan Chapel, Jackson's Lane Independent Chapel, Radnor Street Wesleyan Chapel, Russell Street Mission (Congregational), and Upper Moss Lane Primitive Methodist. Bridgewater Hall Methodist Church opened on the 11 June 1898, situated on the corner of Queen Street and York Street. It was demolished in the late 1960s as part of the redevelopment of Hulme. In 1968 the congregation moved to a new build, Wesley Methodist Church, consisting of two buildings and situated on Royce Road. The church building with it high copper lantern roof was demolished in the early 1990s at the same time as its neighbouring Crescents.

Roman Catholic Church

St Wilfrid's Roman Catholic Church, Birchvale Close (formerly Bedford Street), is an early work of A. W. Pugin: the tower is incomplete and the church is a good example of early Gothic Revival work.

Statistics

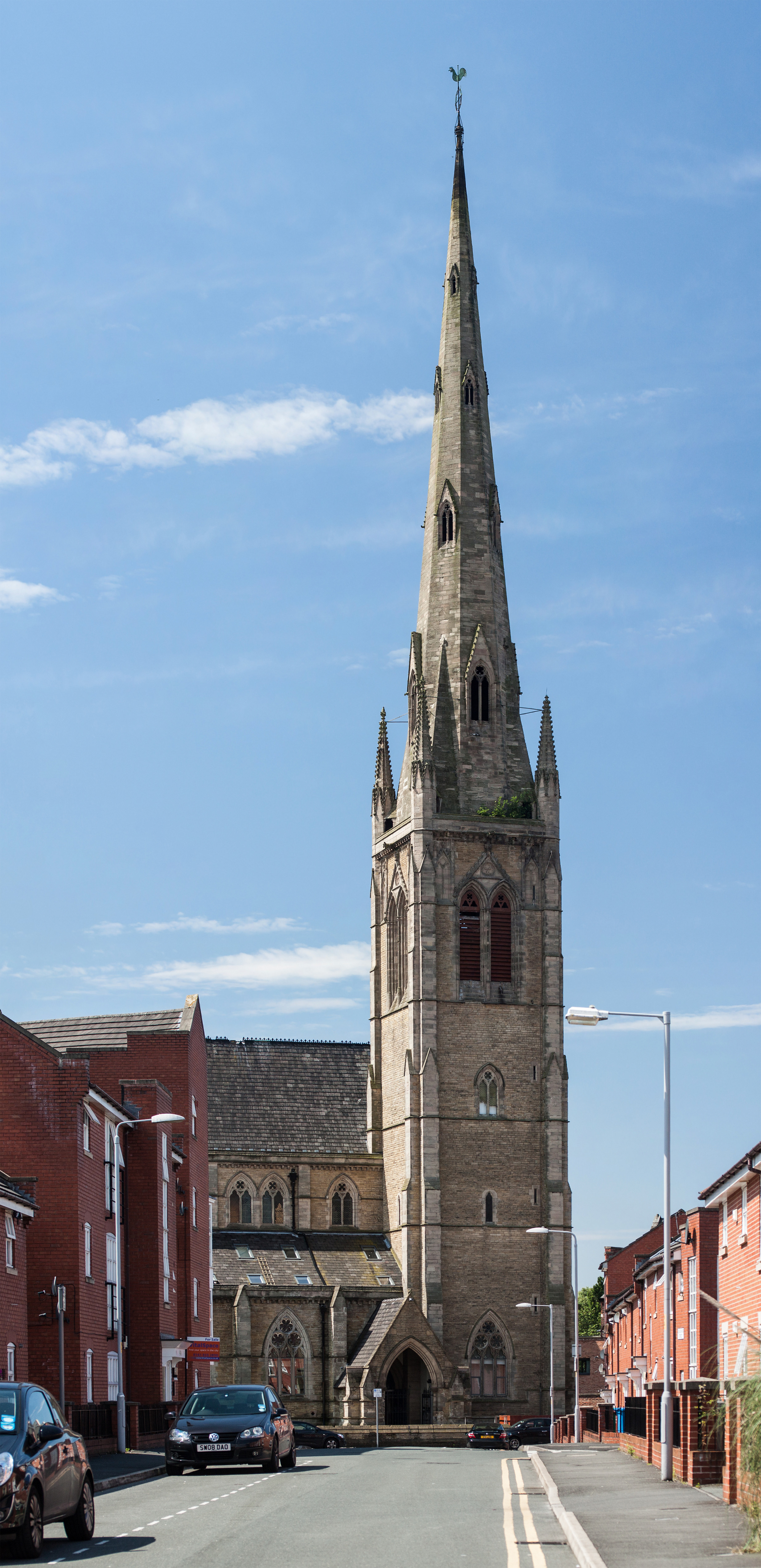
Church of St Mary, Upper Moss Lane

Religion	Hulme Ward	Percentage	All of England	Percentage
All People	10,449	100	49,138,831	100
Christian	5,302	50.74	35,251,244	71.74
No religion	2,646	25.32	7,171,332	14.59
Muslim	827	7.91	1,524,887	3.10
Hindu	126	1.21	546,982	1.11
Buddhist	108	1.03	139,046	0.28
Jewish	83	0.79	257,671	0.52
Sikh	43	0.41	327,343	0.67
Any other religion	78	0.75	143,811	0.29
Religion not stated	1,236	11.83	3,776,515	7.69

From the 2001 UK Census results, Office for National Statistics, Neighbourhood Statistics.

== Industry ==
Nineteenth-century Hulme had some industry in the form of small workshops, but apart from the Knott Mill Iron Works owned by W & J Galloway & Sons on the banks of the Medlock, most large mills and other works were nearby in other townships, but providing employment for the people of Hulme. The chemical works of Roberts, Dale & Co. in Cornbrook was wrecked on 22 June 1887 by a large explosion which began in a stove drying prussic acid. Because the workers were at lunch there was only one fatality.

=== Rolls-Royce ===
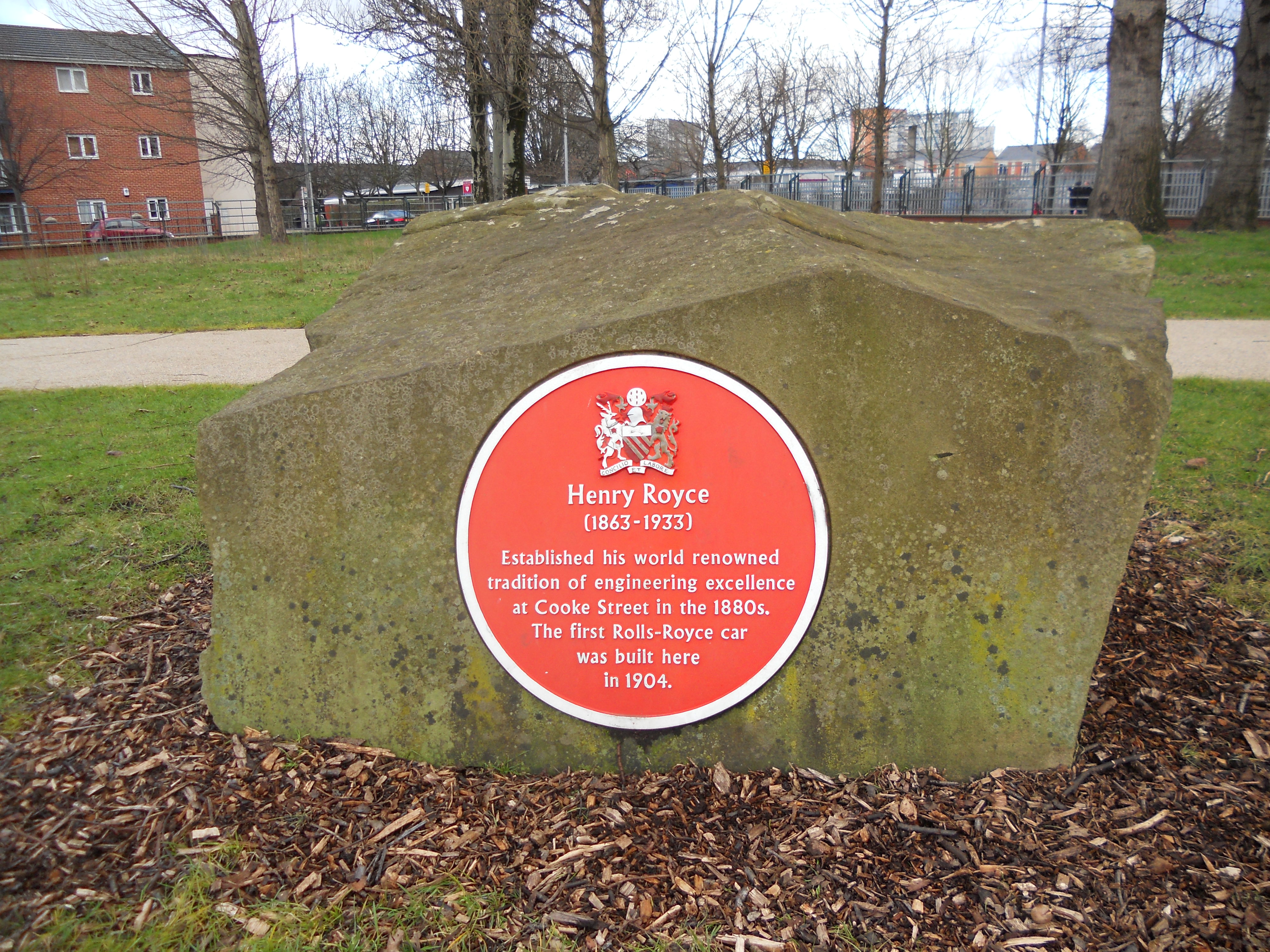
Henry Royce Red Plaque (Manchester City Council commemoration) in Hulme Park

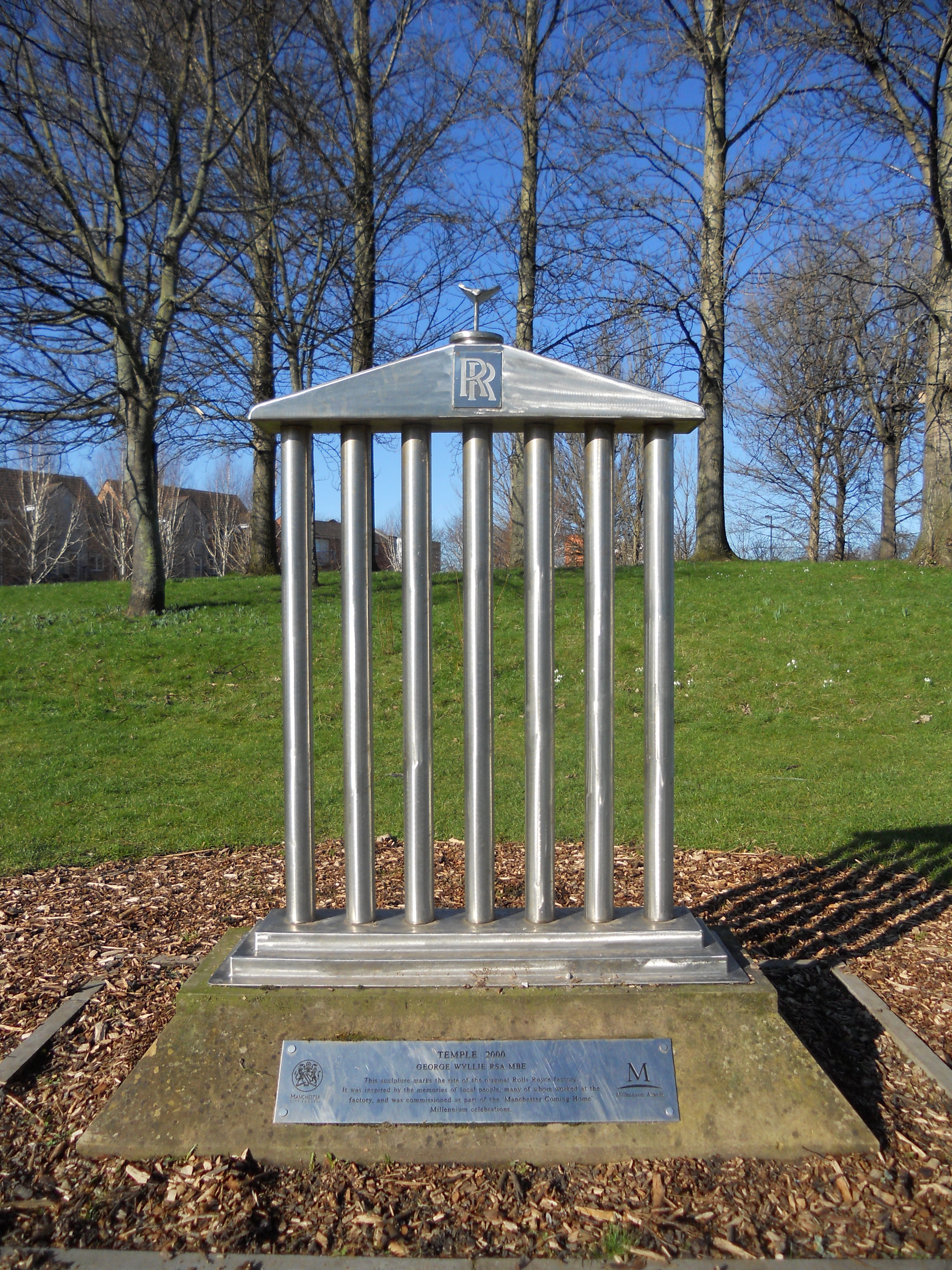
Temple 2000 by George Wyllie in Hulme Park, commemorating the Rolls-Royce factory

In 1884, Henry Royce started a domestic electric fittings factory at Cooke Street. He made three cars (the Royce 10) in a corner of what was his dynamo and electric crane workshops. In 1904, Royce and Charles Stewart Rolls created a business partnership after meeting at Manchester's Midland Hotel and started to build their own motor car (a relatively new invention). Hulme was the location of their first Rolls-Royce workshop, though operations were moved to Derby shortly afterwards. The Silver Ghost was designed and produced in Hulme. The Rolls-Royce V-8 was designed in Hulme in 1905 to compete with the popular electric town cars which were quiet, easy to start and free of smells, smoke and vibration.

Many names in Hulme commemorate this era, such as Royce Road, Rolls Crescent and the Bentley House Estate. The Royce public house, and occasional venue for music and stand-up comedy had a distinctive ceramic historical 'mural' but was razed for the creation of modern flats, in the 1990s regeneration of Hulme. In August 2007, "Temple 2000", a sculpture based on a Rolls-Royce radiator grille by George Wyllie RSA MBE was unveiled in Hulme Park on the site of the old Royce factory at Cooke Street off Stretford Road. The Scottish artist was inspired by the memories of Hulme's older residents, many of whom worked at the factory.

== Recreation ==
Public parks are St George's Park in the northwest and Hulme Park (29 acres) established near Jackson Crescent in 2000. Hulme Community Garden Centre is run as a community benefit society. Their mission is to bring the local community together through gardening, education and volunteering. Hulme was served by a Unit Four cinema, one of the three in the North-West. It opened in 1970 and contained four mini-cinemas housed within a much earlier building.

== Other notable people ==
Rowland Detrosier, a radical politician, preacher and educator, was brought up in Hulme in the early 19th century. John Foulds (1880 – 1939), a composer of classical music, was born in Hulme. He was largely self-taught as a composer, and belongs to the English Musical Renaissance. Albert Hill won a Victoria Cross in the First World War. Noel Aspinall was an Anglican priest who was Archdeacon of Manchester, Rector of St Edmund, Whalley Range, and of St George's, Hulme.

Morrissey, lead singer of the Smiths, spent his childhood in Hulme and neighbouring Stretford. Jazz trumpeter Kevin Davy lived in Hulme during his time as a student at Manchester Polytechnic. Poet and BBC Radio 4 presenter Lemn Sissay spent the first 17 years of his life in care, in Hulme and its surrounding areas. Musician, author and TV presenter John Robb lives in Hulme. Billy Duffy (guitarist with The Cult) grew up in Hulme.

Film critic Mark Kermode lived in Hulme while he was a university student in Manchester. Alfred Garth Jones the illustrator was born in Rutland Street, Hulme, on 10 August 1872. Actor Alan Igbon, known for playing Loggo in Alan Bleasdale's TV drama Boys from the Blackstuff, was born in Hulme.

Albert Scanlon, who played as a winger for Manchester United between 1950 and 1960 and was a survivor of the Munich air disaster in 1958, was born in Hulme in 1935. Jonathan Nall, the first secretary of Hulme Athenaeum's association football club, was born and raised in Hulme and went on to become a significant promoter of the game in Manchester and a president of the Manchester Football Association.

== See also ==
- Listed buildings in Manchester-M15
