= Shade garden =

Garden in an area with little or no sunlight

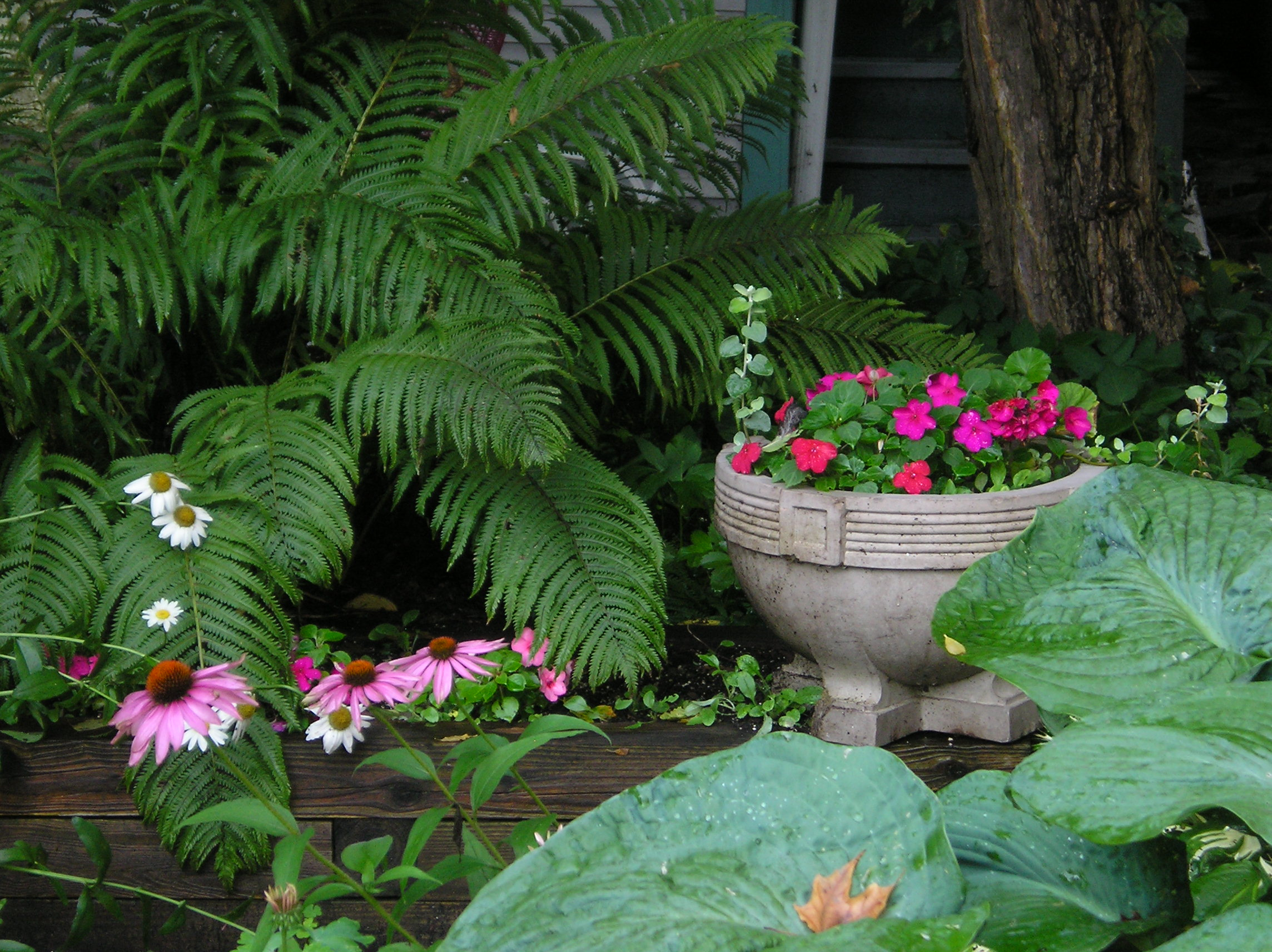
Ferns and small flowers are common shade garden plants

Shade gardens are a type of garden planted and grown in areas with little or no direct sunlight. Shade gardens may occur naturally or by design under trees, as well as on the side of buildings or fences. Gardening in shaded sites is often seen as more difficult because of limited sunlight, and challenges with drainage, and soil management; these factors limit the kinds of plants that can be cultivated in a shade garden.

Plants need to be able to grow in shady conditions and handle competition for sunlight. Very few edible plants grow well in shady conditions, so shade gardens are usually ornamental gardens, though growing flowers may also be difficult in shade. Because of these limitations, shade gardening may be seen as less than ideal; however, shade gardens offer opportunities to cultivate plants with diverse foliage that can provide a variety of shades of green and textures, with some shade-plants providing flowers. Shade gardens may also provide an outdoor retreat from high temperatures.

== Design ==
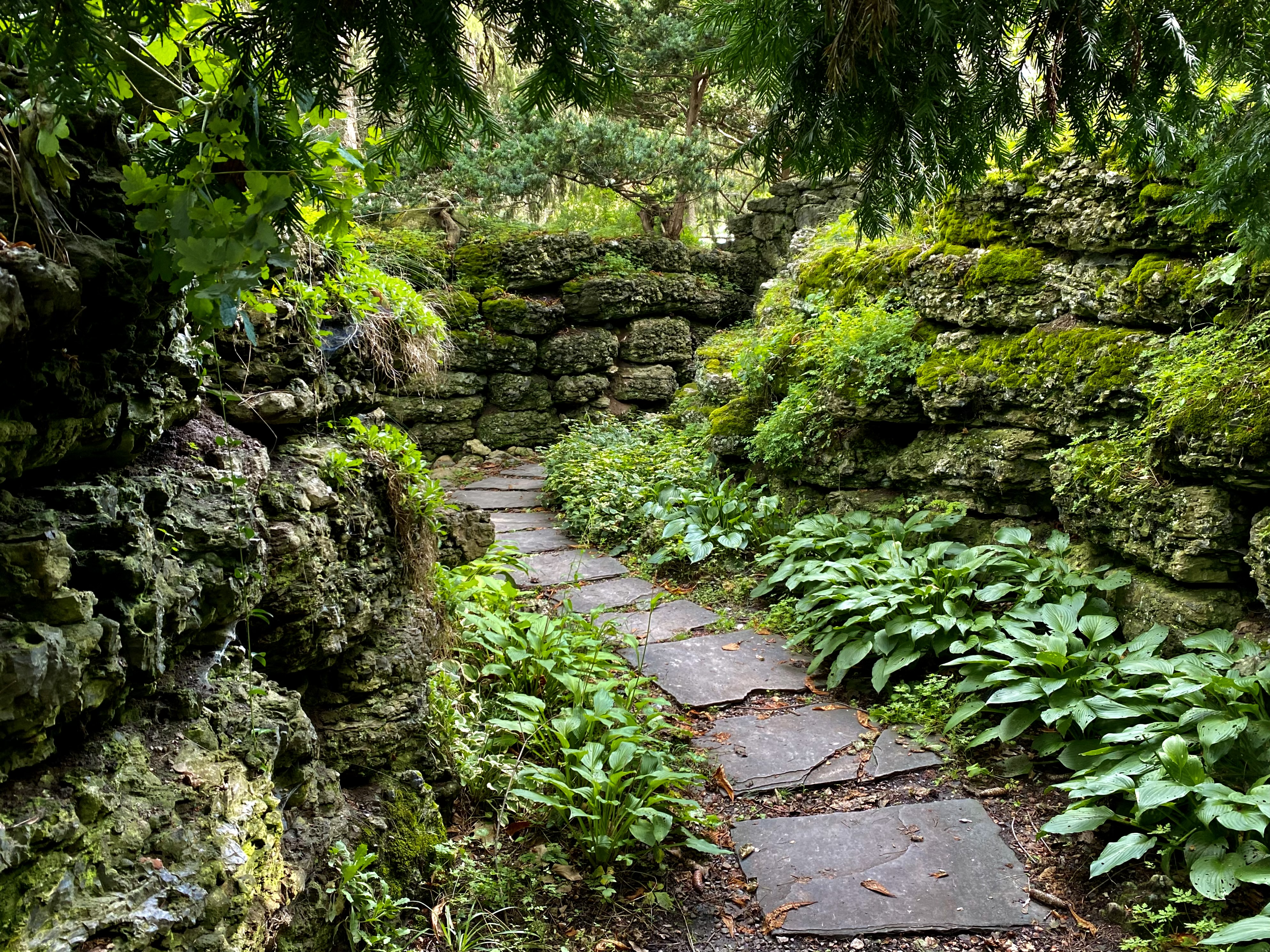
The Rock Garden in Sonnenberg Gardens, New York, shaded by trees, makes use of shade-plants and moss, creating a variety of foliage textures and shades of green.

Shade garden design largely depends on the amount of sunlight that the cultivated plants will be receiving in their location, and the nature of the shade will depend on the environment in which the garden is located.

A garden located near manmade structures like buildings or walls, or natural features like hillsides may have partial shade, with the area receiving 2 to 6 hours of shade per day. Plants that do well in partial shade may benefit from east-facing locations which receive cooler morning sun, compared to west-facing locations which may be exposed to hotter afternoon sun which could cause stress to shade plants. Gardens in full or deep shade receive little to no direct sun, with 6 or more hours of shade during the day, may be located along the north of a building, within a courtyard, or in an area shaded by some kind of barrier such as a roof overhang or shade cloth.

Shade gardens may also be located in areas with light shade, with dappled shade or sunlight, also called filtered shade. Dappled shade may be found beneath tree canopies, creating a pattern of sun and shade that moves throughout the day and depends on the type of tree and the size of the canopy. Areas with light or dappled shade may support growing herbs or some leaf vegetables.

Seasonal changes will also affect shade in garden sites depending on the region; for example, spring and autumn will provide less sunlight in general due to the lower angle of the sun, and sites that receive dappled shade from deciduous trees will receive more light after their leaves fall in late autumn until early spring.

=== Drainage and moisture ===
Shaded sites are more prone to standing water due to slowed evaporation; wet shade sites are the result of areas with poor drainage, stream-sides, or boggy soils. Since woodland and shade plants tend to prefer well-draining soil, shade gardens may require extra considerations in terms of managing drainage; on the other hand, the slowed evaporation in shade gardens means that they may require less water, though areas under large trees may need more frequent watering to support both the tree and cultivated garden plants. Shaded sites below trees and overhanging structures like eaves may result in sites with dry shade. In these conditions, there may still be a period of moisture in the winter and early spring which could be used for establishing cultivated plants.

=== Soil management ===
The lack of light in shade gardens and the proximity of trees and other large plants which create shade may negatively impact soil fertility. Shade plants may also prefer soils that are slightly acidic. Shade plants tend to need less fertilizer, but soil may be amended with compost or other organic matter, usually in spring. Mulch beds could help maintain soil moisture in sites with dry shade. The proximity of shade trees in a shade garden site may lead to pre-existing soil to have dense tree roots, to contend with this, planting areas may be covered with compost and soil mixture to allow plants to establish roots, screens may be added over tree roots may also help prevent tree roots from growing into beds with cultivated plants, and plants with shallow roots may be selected to grow more effectively. Deep shade sites usually have to be prepared for planting by adding compost to existing soil.

== Edible plants in shade gardens ==
Because few flowering plants thrive in shaded conditions, shade gardens are less often used to cultivate edible plants. Edible plants that may be grown in shade gardens include those grown for their leaves, stems, or roots, rather than their fruit. Instead of tomatoes or most gourds, shade gardens may be used for plants like leafy greens and root vegetables which, while requiring some sun, may be grown in partial shade. Herbs can also be grown in shade gardens and may even benefit from shade in sunny climates. Crop options are even more limited in heavy or full shade, but there are some that will still yield a harvest; for example, rhubarb and some members of the genus Ribes like currants and gooseberries may grow well in shade. Mint, which is an invasive plant in many regions, may be easier to manage in heavier shade. Some vining plants will grow decently in the shade, including some gourds like cucumbers and squash, and legumes like runner beans and vining peas.

Fruit crops will produce less in the shade, but some may yield a decent harvest. Various berries which grow naturally in forest edges produce well in shade gardens.

Shade gardens provide protection in sunny locations where leafy greens and herbs would otherwise suffer from leaf scorch and bolting. Because bolting occurs more slowly in the shade, leafy green crops will produce more palatable tender leaves for a longer period. Another potential benefit of shade gardens is that cultivated plants will have fewer infestations from pests which, aside from slugs, prefer sunlit spots. Edible shade gardens will also require less watering than typical vegetable gardens as soil moisture won't evaporate as quickly. Shade gardens used for edible plants can benefit from reflective surfaces such as white walls or fences and mirrors.

== Gallery ==
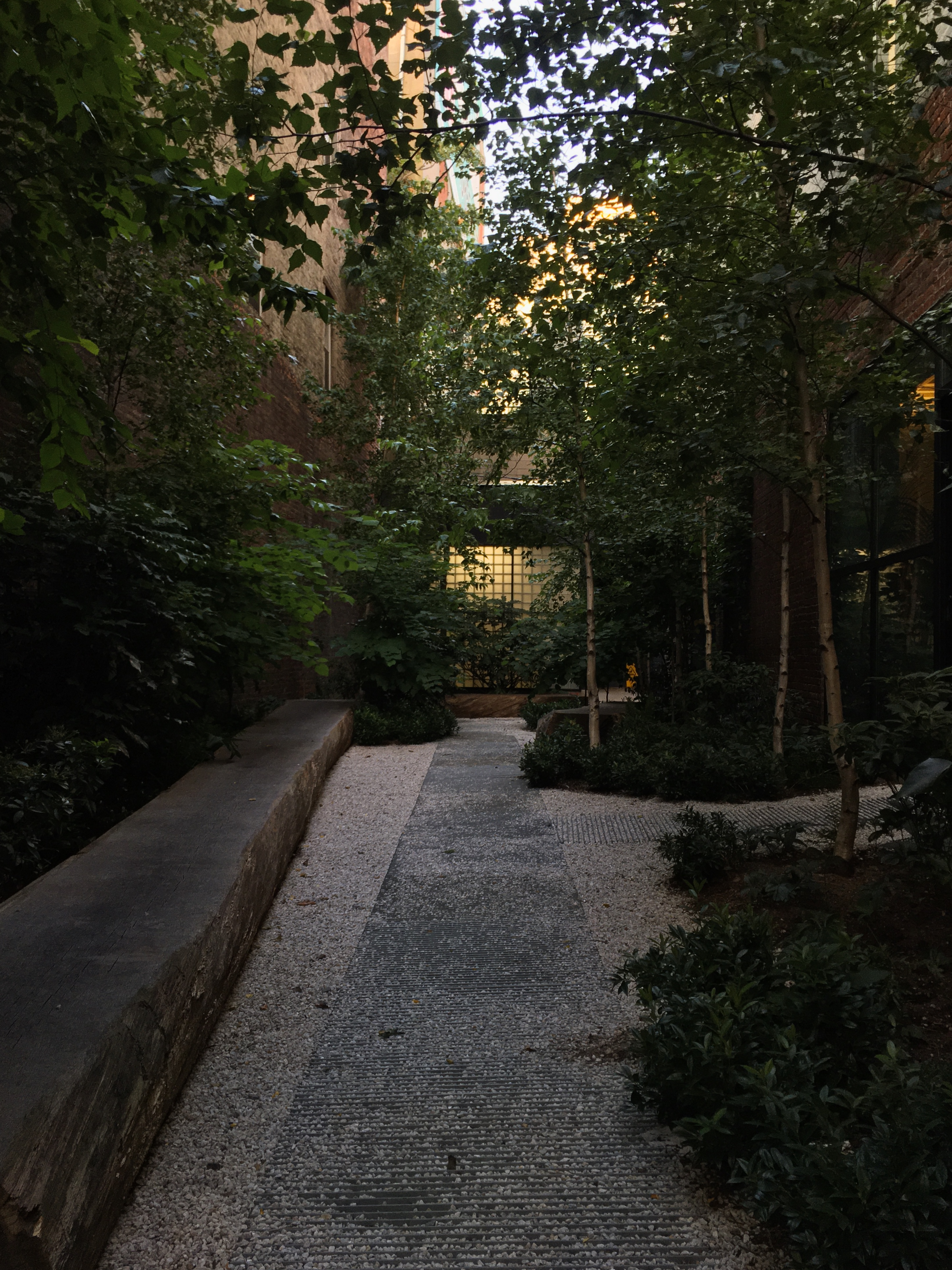
A garden in a shaded courtyard in Brooklyn, New York.

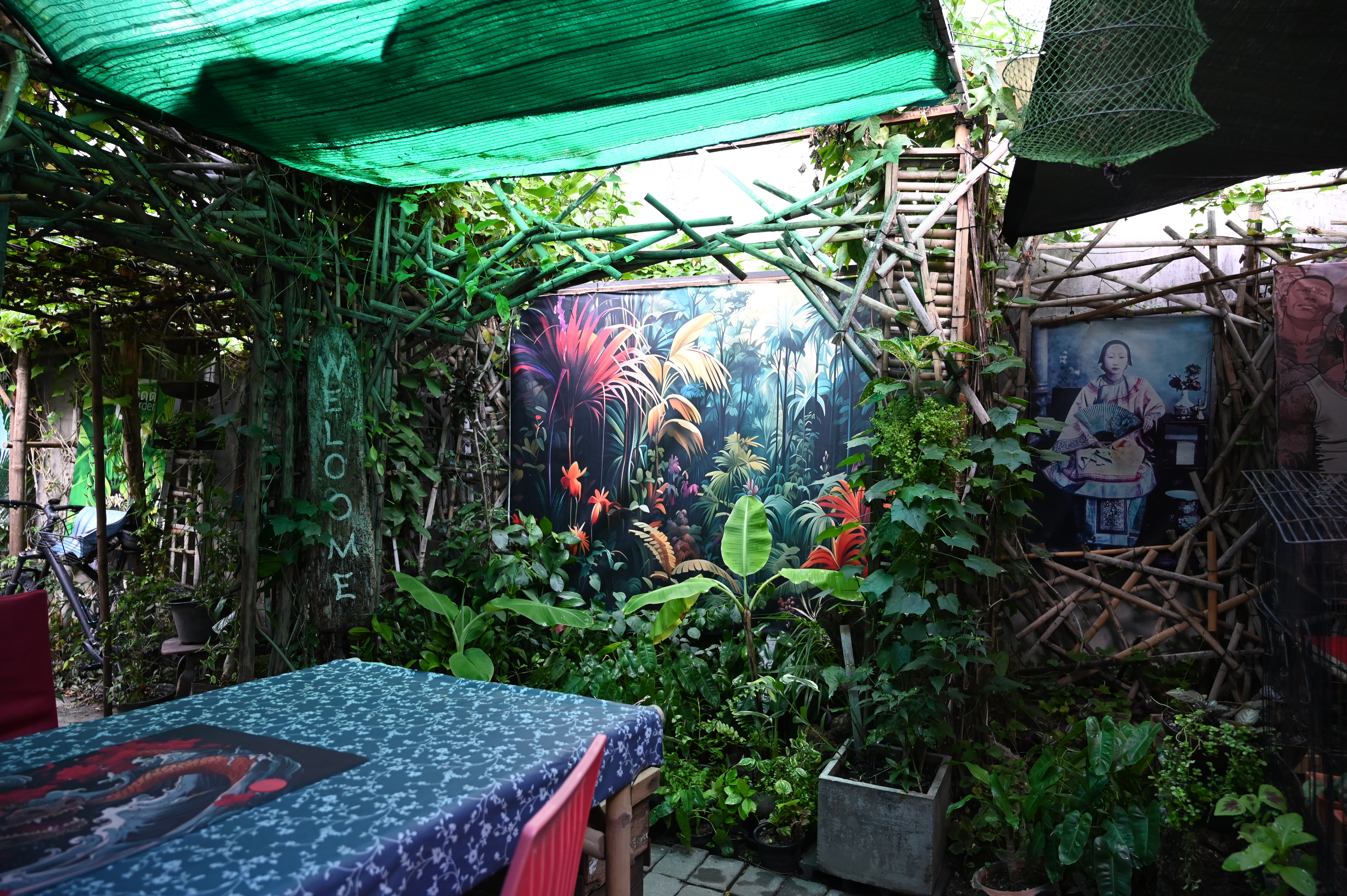
A shaded dining area planted with tropical shade-plants in Mueang Rayong district, Thailand.

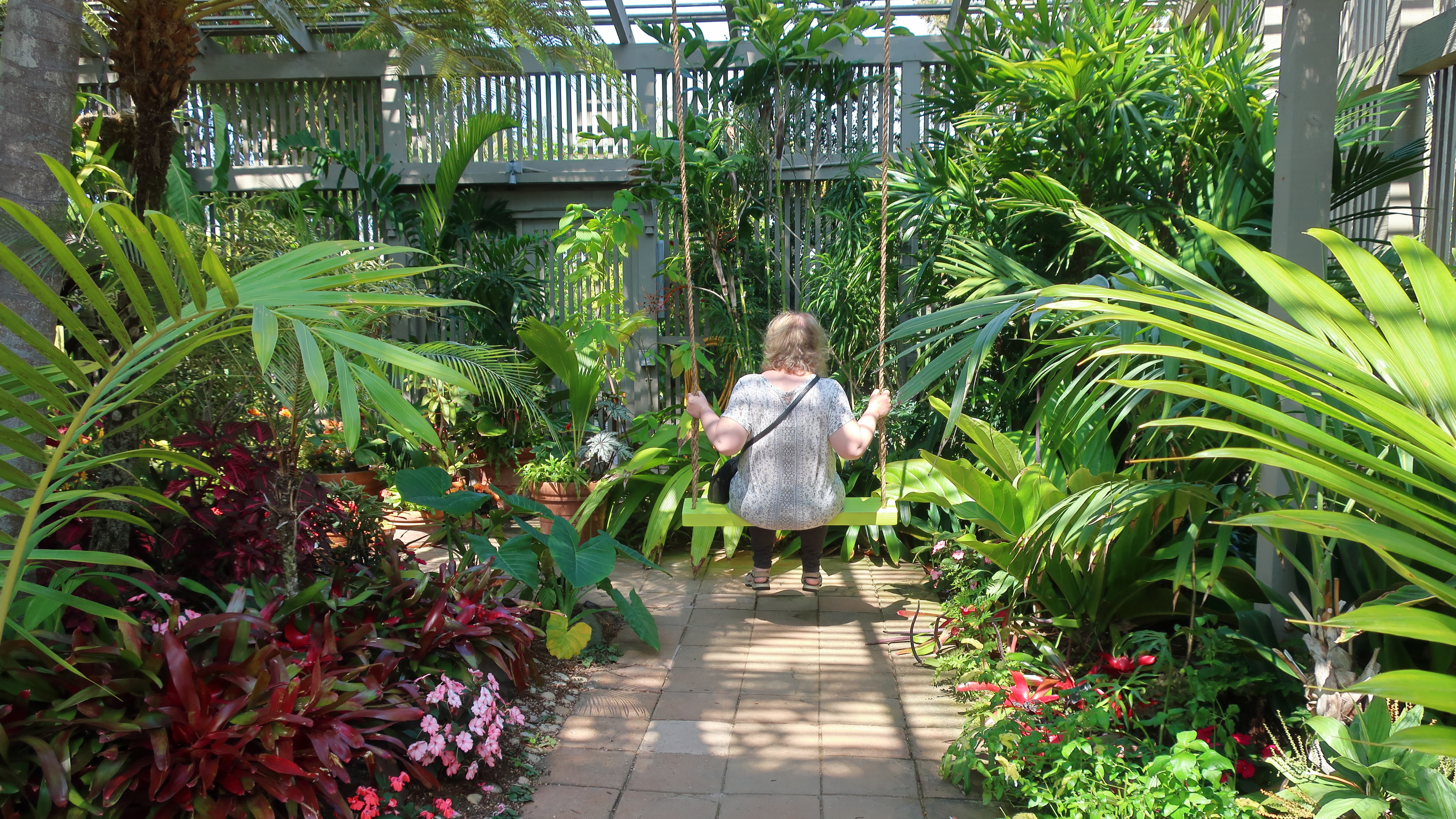
A garden shaded by pergolas in the Sherman Library and Gardens in California.

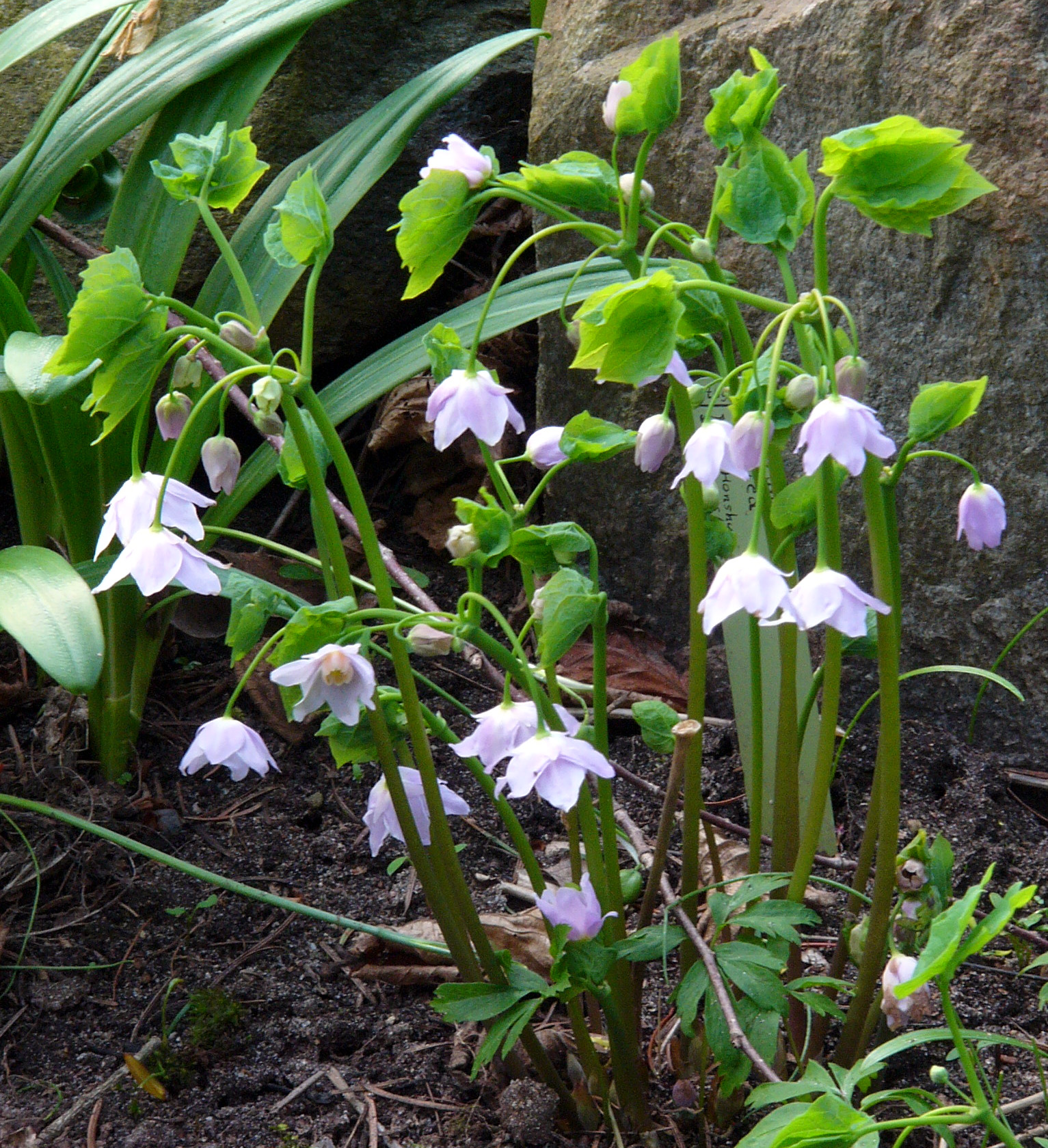
Ranzania japonica, commonly used as a shade-plant in the west, in a shade garden in Sweden.

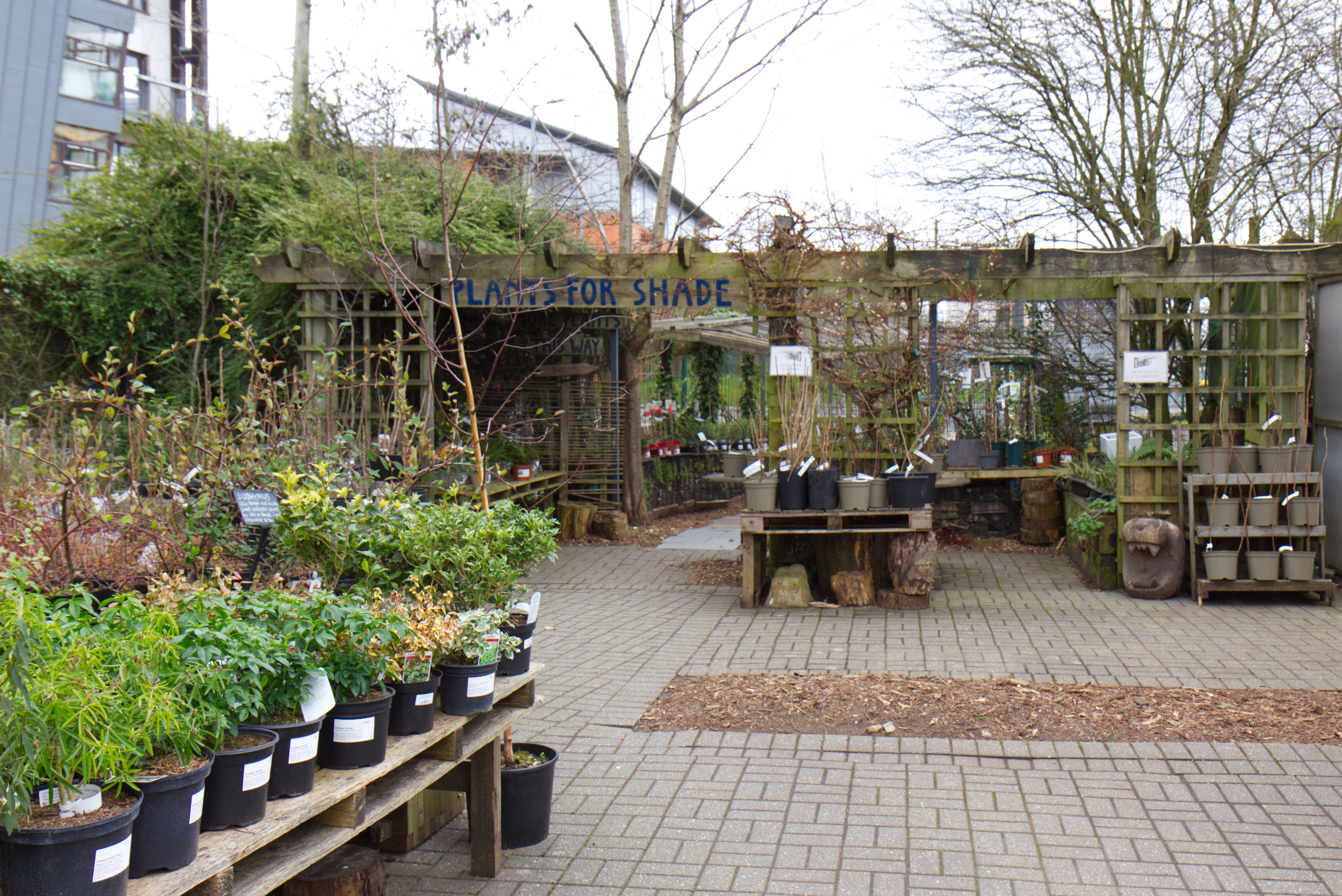
Shade plants for sale in the Hulme Community Garden Centre, Manchester, England.

== See also ==
- List of garden types
- Tsubo-niwa (A type of small traditional Japanese garden located within courtyards or besides structures)
