= Kenneth Ramsey =

Kenneth Venner Ramsey (26 January 1909 – 21 June 1990) was the Suffragan Bishop of Hulme from 1953 until 1975.

He was educated at Portsmouth Grammar School and University College, Oxford. After a curacy at St Matthew, Stretford he was Vice-Principal of Egerton Hall, Manchester, and a Lecturer in Christian Ethics at Manchester University. Later he held incumbencies at Peel, Little Hulton and Didsbury before his elevation to the episcopate.

Church of England titles
Preceded by Hugh Hornby	Bishop of Hulme; 1953–1975	Succeeded by David Galliford
