= Thomas Sherwood Jones =

The Rt Rev Thomas Sherwood Jones (also rendered Sherwood-Jones) was the Anglican Suffragan Bishop of Hulme in Manchester, Britain, from 1930 until 1945.

He was born on 4 March 1872 and educated at Durham University and ordained in 1899. He was curate of St Martin-in-the-Fields, Liverpool then held incumbencies in Toxteth and Birkenhead and then Rural Dean of Middleton before his elevation to the episcopate. A Centenarian, he died on 16 October 1972. His son Norman also became a priest and bishop, serving as Assistant Bishop of Lagos.

Church of England titles
Preceded by John Charles Hill	Bishop of Hulme; 1930 –1945	Succeeded by Hugh Hornby
