= David Galliford =

English bishop (1925–2021)

The Rt Revd David Galliford
- Bishop of Bolton
- Diocese: Diocese of Manchester
- In office: 1984–1991
- Successor: David Bonser
- Other post: Honorary assistant bishop in York (1991–2021 his death)
- Previous post: Bishop of Hulme (1975–1984)

Orders
- Ordination: 1951 (deacon); 1952 (priest)
- Consecration: 1975

Personal details
- Born: 20 June 1925
- Died: 13 November 2021 (aged 96)
- Denomination: Anglican
- Parents: Alfred Bruce & Amy Galliford
- Spouse: Enid Drax (m. 1954; d. 1983); Claire Phoenix (m. 1987)
- Children: 1 daughter
- Occupation: Priest, Bishop, Author
- Education: Clare College, Cambridge

David George Galliford (20 June 1925 – 13 October 2021) was an English Anglican Suffragan Bishop who served in two sees in Manchester diocese between 1975 and 1991.

== Church career ==
Educated at Bede College and Clare College, Cambridge Galliford studied for ordination at Westcott House, Cambridge before embarking on an ecclesiastical career with a curacy at St John Newland, Hull. A Minor Canon at St George's, Windsor, from 1954 until 1956, he subsequently served as Vicar of Newton under Roseberry and Rector of Bolton Percy. From 1970 he was Canon Residentiary and Treasurer of York Minster.

After Kenneth Ramsey's retirement on 30 June 1975, Galliford was consecrated a bishop before his installation as Bishop of Hulme at Manchester Cathedral not long before 7 November. Translated to be the inaugural Bishop of Bolton in 1984, he served in that capacity until he retired in 1991.

== Freemasonry ==
An active English Freemason, Galliford was a member of Exemplar Lodge No 5075 in Manchester, and Marquess of Zetland Lodge No 9349 at Escrick, North Yorkshire.

He served as the Grand Chaplain of the United Grand Lodge of England for three years from 1990 to 1993, the senior clerical appointment within English Freemasonry. He also served locally for several years as the Provincial Grand Chaplain for the Masonic province of Yorkshire (North & East Ridings).

== Later life and death ==
In retirement Bishop Galliford and his second wife lived in Wigginton, North Yorkshire. He served as an honorary assistant priest at the parish Church of St Hilda, Ellerburn, near Pickering, a church famously plagued by bat infestation, which reportedly caused the bishop and his wife health issues.

Galliford died on 13 October 2021, at the age of 96.

Church of England titles
Preceded by Kenneth Ramsey	Bishop of Hulme; 1975–1984	Succeeded by Colin Scott
New title	Bishop of Bolton; 1984–1991	Succeeded by David Bonser
