= Colin Scott (bishop) =

- Bishop of Hulme
- Diocese: Diocese of Manchester
- In office: 1984–1998
- Predecessor: David Galliford
- Successor: Stephen Lowe
- Other post: Honorary assistant bishop in Leicester (1999–2011)

Orders
- Ordination: c. 1958 (deacon); c. 1959 (priest)
- Consecration: 1984

Personal details
- Born: 14 May 1933
- Died: 1 April 2014 (aged 80)
- Denomination: Anglican
- Parents: Kenneth & Marion
- Spouse: Margaret MacKay (m. 1958)
- Children: 1 son; 2 daughters
- Education: Queens' College, Cambridge

Colin John Fraser Scott (14 May 1933 – 1 April 2014) was the Bishop of Hulme from 1984 until 1998.

Scott was educated at Berkhamsted School and Queens' College, Cambridge (becoming a Cambridge Master of Arts). After curacies at St Barnabas, Clapham Common and St James, Hatcham he was Vicar of St Mark, Kennington. Following this he was Vice-Chairman of the Southwark Diocesan Pastoral Committee and then (his final appointment before elevation to the episcopate) Team Rector of Sanderstead. In retirement he served the Church as an honorary assistant bishop within the Diocese of Leicester. He was a prominent member of the Anglican Pacifist Fellowship.

Church of England titles
Preceded by David Galliford	Bishop of Hulme; 1984–1998	Succeeded by Stephen Lowe
