= John Hill (bishop) =

British Anglican bishop (1862–1943)

John Charles Hill (22 May 1862 – 29 March 1943) was the inaugural Suffragan Bishop of Hulme from 1924 until 1930.

Hill was educated at Harrow and Trinity College, Cambridge. After curacies in Kensington and Rotherham he was Rector of Halesowen then Rural Dean of Bury before his appointment to the episcopate.

Church of England titles
New title	Bishop of Hulme; 1924–1930	Succeeded by Thomas Sherwood Jones
