= Hulme Barracks =

Former military installation in Manchester, England

- Hulme
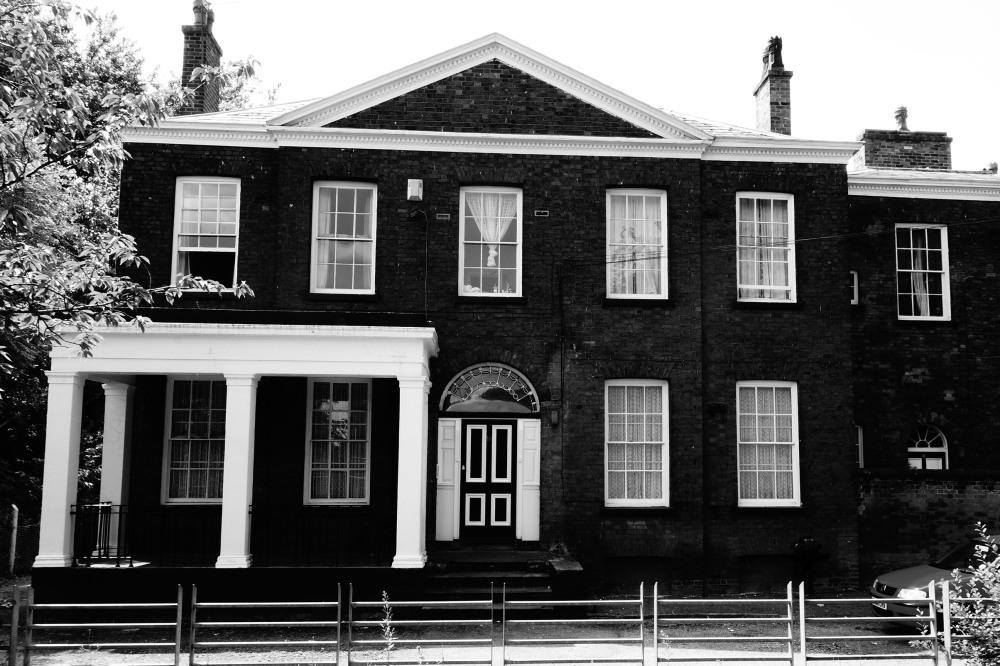
- Hulme Barracks

Site information
- Type: Barracks
- Owner: Ministry of Defence
- Operator: British Army

Location
- Location within Greater Manchester
- Coordinates: 53.468338°N 2.264348°W

Site history
- Built: 1804
- Built for: War Office
- In use: 1804–1914

Garrison information
- Occupants: 15th The King's Hussars
- Designations

Listed Building – Grade II
- Official name: Hulme Barracks
- Designated: 16 November 1978
- Reference no.: 1247392

Hulme Barracks is a former military installation in Hulme, Manchester, England.

== History ==
The barracks were built in the Georgian-style and completed in 1804. They became home to the 15th The King's Hussars, who charged protesters in Manchester in what became known as the Peterloo Massacre in 1819. The barracks were used to house infantry battalions from 1895 until their sale to Manchester Corporation in 1914. The building that remains today is the former officers' mess, officers' quarters and quartermaster's house, the other structures on the site having been demolished. Now converted into flats, Hulme Barracks was designated a Grade II listed building on 16 November 1978.

== See also ==
- Listed buildings in Manchester-M15
