= Bishop of Hulme =

Church of England Bishop

The Bishop of Hulme was an episcopal title used by a suffragan bishop of the Church of England Diocese of Manchester, in the Province of York, England. The See was created by Order in Council on 11 October 1923 (under the Suffragans Nomination Act 1888) and took its name after Hulme, an area of the city of Manchester.

Following the retirement of Stephen Lowe, the last suffragan Bishop of Hulme, in July 2009, the post was axed and its duties were divided between the remaining suffragan bishops of Bolton and of Middleton, who assist the diocesan Bishop of Manchester in overseeing the diocese.

== List of bishops ==
Bishops of Hulme
From	Until	Incumbent	Notes
1924	1930	John Charles Hill	
1930	1945	Thomas Sherwood Jones	
1945	1953	Hugh Hornby	Father of Richard Hornby
1953	1975	Kenneth Ramsey	
1975	1984	David Galliford	Translated to Bolton
1984	1999	Colin Scott	
1999	2009	Stephen Lowe	
Office abolished in 2009
