= Hulme Community Garden Centre =

Garden and centre in Manchester, England

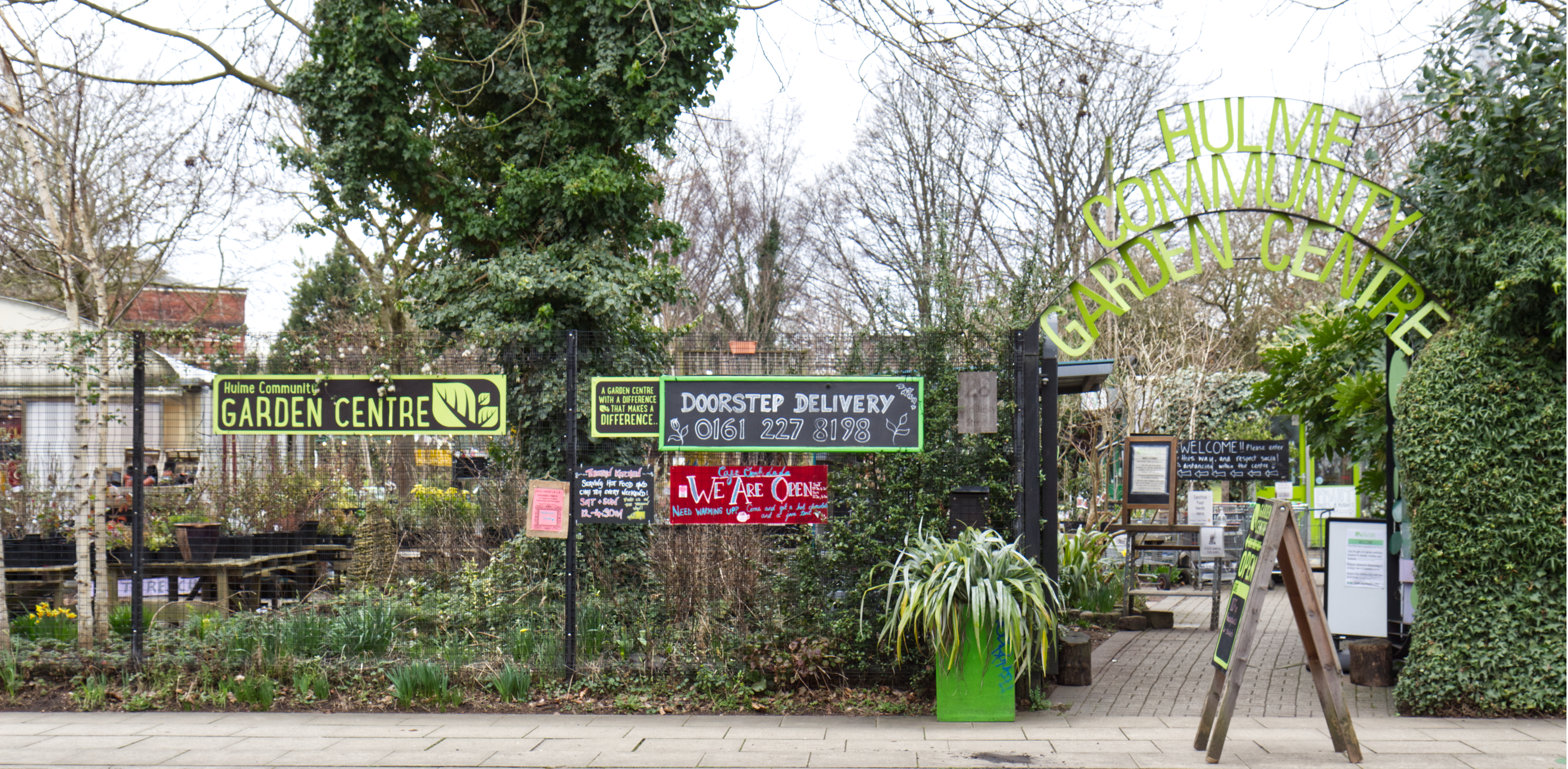
- Location: 28 Old Birley Street, Manchester, England M15 5RD
- Coordinates: 53.4652°N 2.2494°W
- Established: 2001
- Website: hulmegardencentre.org.uk

Hulme Community Garden Centre (HCGC) is a garden and community centre in Hulme, Manchester, England. It was featured in a 2017 episode of the TV show Gardener's World.

== Facilities ==
As well as selling plants, HCGC has a café, a public garden, outdoor cooking spaces, a straw bale classroom and a pond area. HCGC run events throughout the year, from courses on growing vegetables to wellbeing sessions.

== History ==
It opened in 2000, on a brownfield site with the goal of encouraging healthy living through gardening and sustainable food growing.

Ginkgo tree seedlings were grown at the HCGC in 2014 to celebrate the anniversary of Manchester becoming the first nuclear-free city in the UK.

After crowd-funding £15,000 in 2015, the HCGC was able to further develop its site.

An episode of Gardeners' World was filmed at HCGC in 2017, increasing the public's interest in the centre.

As of 2018, HCGC had a turnover of about £250,000. In 2019 HCGC ran a community share offer enabling it to be owned by local residents and supporters.

== Awards ==
- 2014: Gold Award and named best in show, Dig the City festival, Manchester
- 2015: Green Flag Award
