= Stephen Lowe (bishop of Hulme) =

British clergyman (1944–2026)

The Right Reverend Stephen Lowe
- Bishop of Hulme
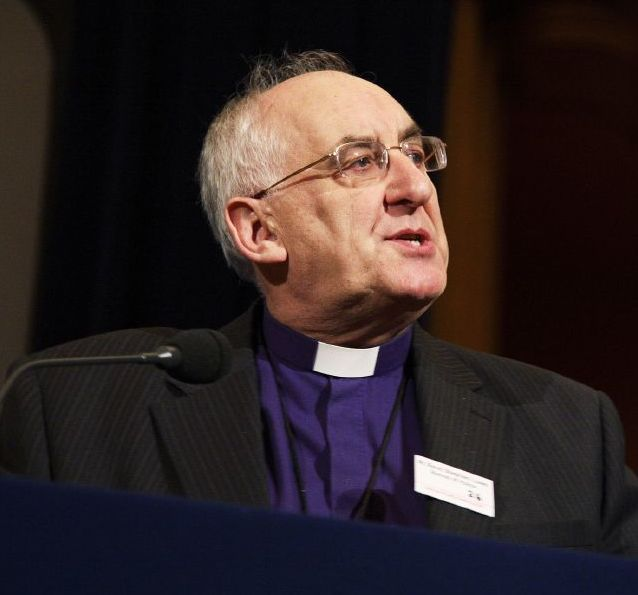
- Church: Church of England
- Diocese: Diocese of Manchester
- In office: 1999 – July 2009 (retired)
- Predecessor: Colin Scott
- Other posts: Honorary assistant bishop in St Asaph (2009–2018); Bishop for Urban Life and Faith (2006–2009); Archdeacon of Sheffield (1988–1999)

Orders
- Ordination: 1968 (deacon); 1969 (priest)
- Consecration: 1999

Personal details
- Born: 3 March 1944 (age 82)
- Denomination: Anglican
- Profession: Writer; broadcaster
- Education: Birmingham Polytechnic (BSc)

Stephen Richard Lowe (3 March 1944 – 25 June 2026) was a British clergyman who was, until his retirement in July 2009, the suffragan Bishop of Hulme in the Anglican Diocese of Manchester, Link Bishop for Namibia and Chair of the Urban Bishops Panel.

Lowe was ordained deacon in 1968 and priest in 1969. From 1988 to 1999 he had served as Archdeacon of Sheffield.

In 2006, he was released from all pastoral oversight in the diocese to concentrate on his 2006 appointment as the Church of England's first "Bishop for Urban Life and Faith", charged with the promotion and dissemination of conclusions of the Faithful Cities report.

== Political views ==
In 2004, Lowe commented in a diocese newsletter on the patriotic hymn "I Vow to Thee, My Country", criticising it for being "heretical" and calling on fellow Church of England clergymen to think "long and hard" about singing the song due to (in Lowe's view) its nationalist undertones.

In 2006, Lowe defended the Church of England's review of its shares in Caterpillar Inc. and other companies used in the territories occupied by the Israeli government, and the Church's planned sale of Jacob And His Twelve Sons by Francisco de Zurbarán.

In 2008, Lowe voiced support of Rowan Williams, Archbishop of Canterbury, in the media controversy over Williams' remarks on sharia law, calling the media treatment of Williams "disgraceful" and a "knee-jerk" reaction in interviews on Newsnight and Radio 4 on 8 February and an appearance on Question Time.

In June 2008 a report commissioned by Lowe, Moral, But No Compass – Church, Government and the Future of Welfare, by Francis Davis and Elizabath Paulhus was the lead story in The Times and has subsequently been the subject of two House of Lords debates.

In June 2009 his book, What Makes a Good City? Public Theology and the Urban Church (which Lowe had co-authored with the theologian Elaine Graham), was published by Darton, Longman and Todd.

On 11 February 2017, Lowe was one of fourteen retired bishops to sign an open letter to the then-serving bishops of the Church of England. In an unprecedented move, they expressed their opposition to the House of Bishops' report to General Synod on sexuality, which recommended no change to the Church's canons or practices around sexuality. By 13 February, a serving bishop (Alan Wilson, Bishop of Buckingham) and nine further retired bishops had added their signatures; on 15 February, the report was rejected by synod.

Lowe died in 2026, aged 82.

Church of England titles
Preceded by Michael Paton	Archdeacon of Sheffield; 1988–1999	Succeeded by Richard Blackburn
