= Hugh Hornby =

British Anglican bishop (1888–1965)

Hugh Leycester Hornby (20 November 1888 – 24 March 1965) was an Anglican clergyman.

Hornby was born at St. Michael's-on-Wyre, near Preston, Lancashire. He was educated at Rugby School and Balliol College, Oxford. He was curate of St. Annes-on-Sea, Lancashire before the First World War, and in 1910 joined up as a 2nd Lieutenant in the 5th Battalion, K.O.R. Lancaster Regiment, T.A. During the war he served as a Temporary Chaplain to the Forces(TCF), being awarded the Military Cross in France in 1916 and becoming an Honorary Chaplain to the Forces when the war ended. The citation for his MC reads ‘For conspicuous gallantry. He volunteered to act as a stretcher-bearer, and did fine work at great personal risk. He is constantly among the men in the trenches, and never thinks of his comfort or safety'(Later, in 1951, he also became an honorary chaplain to the Lancashire Fusiliers.) Also in 1919, he succeeded his father as Vicar of St Michael's on Wyre, a living he held until 1930. He later became the living's joint-patron with his younger brother Edward Windham Hornby (succeeding their uncle) in 1944.

On 4 January 1921 he married Katharine Rebecca May (1894–1979). Their eldest son (born during Hugh's time as Vicar of St Michael's on Wyre) was Richard Hornby, later a Conservative politician. Their other three children were James William, Robert Hugh and Peter Edward.

After his time at St Michael's on Wyre, Hugh became Rector and later also Rural Dean of Bury (1930–1953 and 1934-45 respectively) and later Suffragan Bishop of Hulme (1945–1953). He also became Proctor in Convocation in the dioceses of Blackburn then (1934–45) Manchester, as well as a member of the Church Assembly (1933–45), and chairman of the Manchester Diocesan Church Building Committee, the governors of Bury Grammar School (1930–53), and of the governors of Church Central School, Bury. He retired to Suffolk in 1953, and died at Dunster.
