= St Mary with St John, Upper Edmonton =

Coordinates: 51.61208°N 0.05414°W

The Parish Church of St Mary with St John, Upper Edmonton
- St. John the Evangelist Edmonton (London)
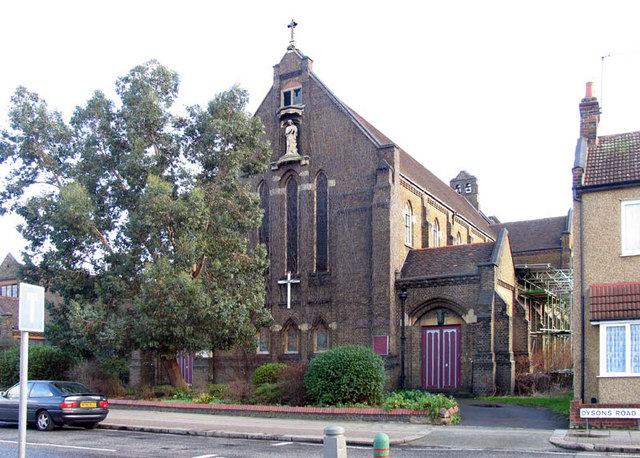
- The church
- The Parish Church of St Mary with St John, Upper Edmonton
- Location: Dysons Road, Edmonton, London, N18 2DS
- Country: England
- Denomination: Church of England
- Churchmanship: Anglo-Catholicism
- Website: https://www.facebook.com/group.php?gid=107104902660271

History
- Dedication: John the Evangelist
- Consecrated: 1906

Architecture
- Architect: Charles Henry Bourne Quennell

Administration
- Diocese: London
- Archdeaconry: Hampstead
- Deanery: Enfield
- Parish: Parish Church of St. Mary with St John, Upper Edmonton

Clergy
- Bishop: Bishop of Edmonton
- Priest: Fr Nigel Asbridge (Vicar)

St. John the Evangelist, Upper Edmonton, is a church in Edmonton and is within the Diocese of London and are under the Bishop of Edmonton, formerly the Rt Revd Peter Wheatley. St John is within the Anglo-Catholic tradition of the Church of England and has the Mass at the centre of parish life.

== History ==
The foundation stone for the church was laid on July 22, 1905, by Samuel Forde Ridley, MP. The church was designed by architect, Charles Henry Bourne Quennell (whose wife painted the pictures on the pulpit), built by Albert Monk and Paul Woodroffe installed the stained glass windows. A plaque adorning the church is inscribed with these details.

== The church today ==
In 2004 the church building was closed but despite the closure of the church building, the congregation persisted to remain on the site and with the help of priest missioner - Fr Nigel Asbridge, moved back into the church in September 2010.

The work to repair St John's Church is now completed and Peter Wheatley, Bishop of Edmonton came to rededicate the Church in July 2012. The east end of the nave and chancel, Lady Chapel, vestry and Sunday School room has been restored to their former glory, whilst the west end has been converted to provide new facilities for the Hanlon Centre.

In July 2012 as well as the rededication of the church and the opening of St Matthew's School Annex, HRH Prince Andrew came to formally open the new Hanlon Centre and St Matthew's School.

St Matthew's CofE Primary School has now opened an annexe in the small hall, and further work will take place over the summer to convert the large church hall into a school hall, dining room and kitchens and provide further classrooms in the vicarage garden.

== Clergy ==
There follows a table of all the Vicars, Incumbents, Rectors, Curates, Honorary Curates and Curates in charge.

1906 -	Rev Bird (First Incumbent)
-	Rev W. Swinton Ryan
–	Rev Arthur Adams (Curate)
–	Rev W. R. M. Pugh
–	Rev G. Watling
–	Rev J. G. Leech
dates ?	Rev William Povey
–	Rev W. E. Erant
– 1960	Rev C. G. Watts
1960–1966	Revd E. Ayerst(Parish Priest)
–	Rev J. Lindo (Curate)
1966–1998	Fr Derek Gough (Vicar)
1960–1998	Fr Ronald Jordan(Curate)
1998–2004	The Revd Canon Andrew Dangerfield (Parish Priest)
1999–2004	Fr Robin Fox (Curate in Charge)
2004–2008	Fr Stuart Owen (Priest in Charge)
2007–2011	Deacon (Fr.) George Nowak (SSM Parish Deacon)
2008-January 2010	Vacant
February 2010 – Present	Fr Nigel Henry Asbridge (Vicar)
May 2013 – 2018	Fr Martin Waswa (Assistant Priest)
January 2019 – Present	Fr Martin Poole SSC (Honorary Assistant Priest)

Fr. Derek Gough was the longest-serving priest at St Mary with St John's Church staying 32 years in his role as parish priest.

The Priest in Charge is currently Fr Nigel Asbridge who is supported by Fr Martin Waswa
