= Robert Coogan (priest) =

Australian-born Anglican clergyman

Robert Arthur William Coogan (11 July 1929 - 25 February 2025) was an Australian-born Anglican clergyman who was Archdeacon of Hampstead from 1985 to 1994.

A Tasmanian, Coogan was educated at his home state university and later completed a diploma in Theology at Durham University. He was Curate of St Andrew, Plaistow then Rector of Bothwell. He then held further incumbencies in North Woolwich, Hampstead, Gospel Oak and Old St Pancras. He was also Area Dean of South Camden (1975–1981) and North Camden (1978–1983); a Prebendary of St Paul's Cathedral (1982-1985; and Examing Chaplain to the Bishop of Edmonton from 1985 to 1994.

Coogan died in 2025, aged 95.

== Notes ==
Church of England titles
Preceded by Fred Pickering	Archdeacon of Hampstead; 1985 – 1994	Succeeded by Peter Wheatley
