= Fred Pickering (priest) =

Fred Pickering (18 November 1919 - 22 January 2010) was Archdeacon of Hampstead from 1974 to 1984.

Pickering was educated at Preston Grammar School, St Peter's College Oxford and St Aidan's College Birkenhead. He began his career with curacies in Leyland and Islington. He was Organising Secretary. for The Church Pastoral Aid Society from 1948 to 1951. He held incumbencies at All Saints, Burton-on-Trent, St John, Carlisle and St Cuthbert, Wood Green. He was also Rural Dean of East Haringey from 1968 to 1973; and Examining Chaplain to the Bishop of Edmonton from 1973 to 1984.

== Notes ==
Church of England titles
Preceded by Hubert Arthur Stanley Pink	Archdeacon of Hampstead; 1974 – 1984	Succeeded by Robert Arthur William Coogan
