= John Hawkins (archdeacon of Hampstead) =

Archdeacon of Hampstead, born 1963

John Edward Inskipp Hawkins (born 6 June 1963) has been Archdeacon of Hampstead since 2015.

Hawkins was educated at King's College London and The Queen's Foundation. He was ordained deacon in 1988 and priest in 1989. After a curacy at Holy Trinity, Birchfield he was Team Vicar of All Saints, Poplar then St John, West Hendon. He was Priest in charge of St Matthias, Colindale from 2007 to 2015. He was appointed a Prebendary of St Paul's Cathedral in 2013.

== Notes ==
Church of England titles
| Preceded by Luke Jonathan Miller | Archdeacon of Hampstead; 2015 – | Succeeded by Incumbent |
