= Anderson Jeremiah =

British Anglican bishop (born 1975)

The Right Reverend Anderson Jeremiah
- area bishop of Edmonton
- Church: Church of England
- Diocese: Diocese of London
- In office: 25 April 2024
- Predecessor: Rob Wickham

Orders
- Ordination: 2003 (deacon); 2004 (priest)
- Consecration: 25 April 2024 by Justin Welby

Personal details
- Born: Anderson Harris Mithra Jeremiah; April 1975 (age 51) Tamil Nadu
- Spouse: Revd Dr Rebecca Aechtner
- Children: 2
- Education: University of Madras; University of Edinburgh

Anderson Harris Mithra Jeremiah (born April 1975) is an Indian Anglican bishop. He has been Bishop of Edmonton of the Church of England since April 2024.

== Early life and education ==
Jeremiah was born in Tamil Nadu, India, in April 1975. He was educated at the University of Madras and the University of Edinburgh. He studied for ordination at United Theological College, Bangalore.

== Ordained ministry ==
He served his title at St Mary, Ranipet, after which he was chaplain at Christian Medical College, Vellore. He was curate at Christ Church Morningside in Edinburgh from 2008 until 2011. Jeremiah was honorary priest in charge at St Mary, Gisburn from 2014 to 2016; and then non-stipendiary minister at St Mary with St John and St Anne, Lancaster. His last roles before becoming a bishop were as Canon Theologian in the Diocese of Blackburn and Associate Dean (Equality, Diversity, Inclusion and People) in the Faculty of Arts and Social Sciences at Lancaster University.

=== Episcopal ministry ===
On 20 December 2023, it was announced that Jeremiah was to be the next Bishop of Edmonton, a suffragan bishop of the Diocese of London. On 25 April 2024, he was consecrated as a bishop by Justin Welby, the Archbishop of Canterbury, during a service at Canterbury Cathedral. He was installed as the Bishop of Edmonton at St Paul's Cathedral on 19 May 2024.

== Personal life ==
Jeremiah is married to Revd Dr Rebecca Aechtner. They have two daughters.
