= Michael Lawson =

Michael Lawson may refer to:

- Michael Lawson (singer), Irish singer
- Michael Lawson (priest), Anglican priest and composer
- Mickey Lawson, Scottish football player and manager
