= Michael Lawson (priest) =

Michael Charles Lawson (born 23 May 1952) is an Anglican priest (formerly the Archdeacon of Hampstead), and also a composer, film maker, and author.

Lawson was educated at Hove Grammar School, Guildhall School of Music, Ecoles d’Art Américaines, University of Sussex and Trinity College, Bristol (BCTS).

He was ordained deacon in 1978, and Priest in 1979. He was a curate at St Mary the Virgin, Horsham from 1978 to 1981; curate and director of pastoral care at All Souls, Langham Place from 1981 to 1986; vicar of Christ Church, Bromley from 1987 to 1999; archdeacon of Hampstead from 1999 to 2010; and rector of St Saviour, Guildford from 2010 to 2012. From 2009 to 2014 he was national chair of the Church of England Evangelical Council.

Having retired from parochial ministry in 2012, from 2013 to 2020 Lawson served part-time as a chaplain at HMP Littlehey where he worked in counselling offenders. Since 2022, his musical works have been distributed by Universal Edition in Vienna.

== Notes ==
Church of England titles
Preceded by Peter Wheatley	Archdeacon of Hampstead; 1999–2010	Succeeded by Luke Miller
