= List of Bob the Builder characters =

This is a list of animated characters from the Bob the Builder television franchise. The titular protagonist named Bob, is a general contractor and has a business partner, secretary, laborer and best friend named Wendy, as well as five main anthropomorphic construction vehicles that help him out: Scoop the digger, Muck the bulldozer, dumper and dump truck, Lofty the crane, Dizzy the cement mixer and Roley the steamroller, also known as the Can-Do Crew. In Project: Build It and Ready, Steady, Build!, there were more newly added anthropomorphic construction vehicles that help Bob out, likewise for the 2015 reboot.

== Humans ==
=== Main ===
- Bob (voiced by Neil Morrissey in the UK and by William Dufris in the original series, Greg Proops in series 10-14 of Project: Built It and Marc Silk in series 15 and 16 of Project: Built It and Ready, Steady, Build! in the US; also voiced by Lee Ingleby in the UK and Colin Murdock in the US in the reboot series) is a general contractor and head of his own roadway based in Bobsville and later in Sunflower Valley, and now Fixham Harbour and then Spring City. Bob is from a family of general contractors – his father Robert is also a general contractor, and so was his grandfather Billy. He is assisted by Wendy and a host of anthropomorphic road vehicles, including tractors, in various projects in and around the town. He is the owner of Pilchard and he is not very good with computers. Some of the problems in the show arise from Bob's habit of forgetting to turn his mobile phone on. He is widely mistaken as the one with the "Can we fix it?" catchphrase when it was actually Scoop the digger who asks it; however Bob does ask his team "Can we build it?" in the reboot series.
- Wendy (voiced by Kate Harbour in the UK and Lorelei King in the US in the original series, Project: Built It and Ready, Steady, Build!; also voiced by Joanne Froggatt in the reboot series) is Bob's business partner, secretary, laborer and best friend who runs the office and always keeps the business in order, and often organizes tools and equipment. She is also seen doing construction work in many episodes. Wendy is often worried about Bob's cat, Pilchard, as shown in the episode "Pilchard in a Pickle" and in the song "Find That Cat".
- Leo (voiced by Jacob Scipio in the UK and Daniel Bacon in the US) is a college student, Bob's apprentice and Curtis' son. Introduced in the 2015 series.

=== Recurring ===
- Farmer Percy Pickles (voiced by Neil Morrissey in the UK, William Dufris in the original series and Vincent Marzello in Project: Build It and Ready, Steady, Build! in the US; also voiced by Nick Mercer in the reboot series) is a nearby farmer, and a very good friend of Bob who often helps out in his construction projects. He is the owner of Travis, Spud, Scruffty, Sumsy and Packer.
- Mrs. Potts (voiced by Kate Harbour in the UK and Lorelei King in the US) is a Bobsville resident and the owner of Tommy.
- Mrs. Percival (voiced by Kate Harbour in the UK and Lorelei King in the US) is Bobsville's local school headteacher.
- Mr. Bernard Bentley (voiced by Rob Rackstraw in the UK, the US version starting Project Build It! and Ready Steady Build! and Alan Marriott in the US version of the original series; also voiced by Nick Mercer in the UK and Ian James Corlett in the US in the reboot series) is Bobsville's building inspector and later Mayor of Sunflower Valley and then Fixham Harbour's building inspector, and Barbara Bentley's husband. His original catchphrase is "Oh, my word!" In the reboot series, he is Mayor Madison's right-hand man and gains a much more nerdy, clumsy personality and a brand new catchphrase which is "Oh, dear me! Mayor Madison will be here any second!"
- Mr. Benjamin Dixon (voiced by Rob Rackstraw in the UK and Alan Marriott in the US) is Bobsville's local postman.
- Mr. Jeremy Ellis (voiced by Rob Rackstraw in the UK and Alan Marriott in the US in the original series and Rupert Degas in the US version of Project: Build It in the episode, "Scrambler and the Colorful Cave" (which is the seventh episode of the eleventh series and the one-hundred-and-thirty-ninth episode of Bob the Builder altogether) is the manager of the Bobsville museum.
- Mr. Bill Beasley (voiced by Rob Rackstraw in the UK and William Dufris in the original series, Greg Proops in series 10-14 and Marc Silk in series 15 and 16 of Project: Build It in the US) is a clumsy and indecisive Bobsville, later Sunflower Vallery resident and a regular customer of Bob and his team.
- Mr. Angelo Sabatini (voiced by Neil Morrissey in the UK, William Dufris in the original series and Vincent Marzello in Project: Build It in the US) is Carlo and Cassia Sabatini's father, the owner and chef of the local pizza shop in Bobsville and the Sunflower Valley bakery, as well as Sophia Sabatini's husband.
- Mrs. Barbara Bentley (voiced by Kate Harbour in the UK and Lorelei King in the US) is Mr. Bentley's wife and a good friend of Bob and the team.
- J.J. (voiced by Colin McFarlane) is the manager of the suppliers yard, Molly's father, the owner of Skip and Trix, and the new owner of Hamish.
- Molly (voiced by Llewella Gideon in the UK and Lachele Carl in the US) is J.J.'s daughter who helps him out a lot in the suppliers yard.
- Robert (voiced by Richard Briers in the UK and Vincent Marzello in the US in the original series and Lee Ingleby in the reboot series) is Bob and Tom's father, Dorothy's husband and a retired general contractor. He built most of Bobsville, which was named after him. He helps Bob and the team restore an old castle. He later takes the building jobs in Bobsville while the team are in Sunflower Valley.
- Dorothy (voiced by June Whitfield in the UK and Lorelei King in the US) is Bob and Tom's mother and Robert's wife. She later takes over Wendy's old job as the secretary at the Bobsville building yard while the team are in Sunflower Valley.
- Sunny (voiced by Rupert Degas) is Marjorie's son and Saffron's brother.
- Saffron (also voiced by Emma Tate) is Marjorie's daughter and Sunny's sister.
- Carlo (also voiced by Rupert Degas) and Cassia Sabatini (also voiced by Emma Tate) are Mr. and Mrs. Sabatini's twins.
- Baz (also voiced by Rupert Degas) is an Australian sheep shearer and Farmer Pickles' cousin.
- Annie Pickles (also voiced by Kate Harbour in the UK and Lorelei King in the US) is a seaweed farmer and Farmer Pickles' cousin.
- Meg MacDonald (also voiced by Kate Harbour) is a Scottish milkmaid who was originally a goat herder.
- Piper MacDonald (also voiced by Rupert Degas) is Meg's nephew who assists her with her dairy products.
- Pablo Sabatini (also voiced by Rupert Degas in the UK and Marc Silk in the US) is Mr. Sabatini's brother who runs the ice cream parlour in Sunflower Valley.
- Bradley "Brad Rad" Radical (also voiced by Rupert Degas) is the owner of Fixham Harbour's surf school.
- Mr. David Mockney (also voiced by Rupert Degas) is the manager of the Fixham Harbour museum. His name is a reference to British artist David Hockney.
- Mrs. Toosie (voiced by Kate Harbour in the UK and Emma Tate in the US) is the owner of Fixham Harbour's local toy shop.

==== 2015 series ====
- Mayor Maria Madison (voiced by Lucy Montgomery in the UK and Nicole Oliver in the US) is the mayor of Spring City. She is involves in a running gag, in which she tries to get her picture taken for the newspaper or a magazine, but it always goes wrong. For example, in "Sky-High Scoop", she tries to get her picture taken at the top of the new skyscraper and Gull lands on her and she tries to shoo her away.
- Chef Seymour Tattie (voiced by Iain Lauchlan) is a celebrity chef.
- The Spring City Rockets are active members of the Spring City community.
  - Saffi (voiced by Mia Hope in the UK and Kazumi Evans in the US) is one of the Spring City Rockets. Her hair is tied in pigtails, and she owns a pet.
  - JJ (voiced by William Haresceugh in the UK and Erin Mathews in the US) is also a member of the Spring City Rockets. JJ is not to be confused with J.J. from the original series.
  - Brandon (voiced by Lewis Andrews in the UK and by Vincent Tong and Dylan Schombing in the US) is also a member of the Spring City Rockets.
  - Mila (voiced by Holly Hazelton in the UK and Rebecca Shoichet in the US) is also a member of the Spring City Rockets.
- Anish Bose (voiced by Kulvinder Ghir) is an archaeologist and Saffi's father.
- Jenny Dobbs (voiced by Lucy Montgomery in the UK and Nicole Oliver in the US) is a zookeeper at Fixham Zoo.
- Tilly Corner (voiced by Sarah Hadland in the UK and Erin Mathews in the US) is a vet.
- Curtis (voiced by Danny John-Jules) is Leo's father and the owner of the local service station.

=== Minor ===
- Lennie Lazenby (voiced by Chris Evans in the UK and the US dub of A Christmas to Remember and Alan Marriott in the US dub of "Roley and the Rock Star") is Bobsville's resident rock star and guitarist and lead singer of "Lennie and the Lazers" rock band.
- Bunty Ferguson (voiced by Alison Steadman in the UK and Lorelei King in the US) is the mayor of Bobsville who appeared in two episodes.
- Tom (voiced by Stephen Tompkinson in the UK and Rupert Degas in the US) is Bob's fraternal twin brother who works as a zoologist.
- Banger (voiced by Noddy Holder) is Lennie and the Lazers' roadie.
- Jenny (voiced by Kate Harbour in the UK and Lorelei King in the US) is Wendy's sister.
- Mr. Adam Fothergill (voiced by Neil Morrissey in the UK and Alan Marriott in the US) is a Bobsville resident and computer handyman, who is plagued with allergies. He is Hamish's first owner, but he gave Hamish away to J.J. and Molly after he discovered that he was allergic to him.
- David Dixon (voiced by Neil Morrisey in the UK and Alan Marriott in the US) is a very famous football goalkeeper and Mr. Dixon's brother.
- Dr. Florence Mountfitchet (voiced by Brenda Blethyn in the UK and Lorelei King in the US) is a member of Local Heritage. She asked Bob and the team restore an old castle.
- Pam Goody (voiced by Kate Harbour in the UK in the original series and Lorelei King in the US in Project: Build It episode: "Wendy's Party Plan" as a speaking cameo) is the manager of the Arts Centre.
- Mrs. Sophia Sabatini (voiced by Kate Harbour in the UK and Lorelei King in the US) is Mr. Sabatini's wife and Carlo and Cassia's mother.
- Jana Von Strudel (voiced by Ulrika Jonsson) is an Austrian yodeler, the host of the Bobblesberg Winter Games and the former owner of Zoomer.
- Marjorie (voiced by Emma Tate) is the new manager at Farmer Pickles' factory.
- Pirate Brickbeard (voiced by Rupert Degas) was the pirate who founded Fixham Harbour. He has a ship known as the Boney Beard. He has a golden hammer that he hides on the Boney Beard and leaves clues as to its whereabouts around Fixham. His catchphrase is "No one will ever find my Golden Hammer! Har, har!"
- Tony Toberomi (voiced by Rob Rackstraw in the UK and Marc Silk in the US) is the owner and manager of the Fixham Harbour Dinosaur Park.

==== 2015 series ====
- Henry Corner (voiced by John Sheahan) is a Spring City resident who marries Vet Tilly in "Wild Wild Wedding". He works at the racetrack.
- Dash Lightning (voiced by Steven Kynman) is a star of children's films and TV shows. Dash is very well known for saying "With a zoom! Boom!! Lightning strikes twice!" Dash has a big passion for tools and equipment and consequently is in awe of Bob.
- Mei Moon (voiced by Jing Lusi) is a scientist who works at the observatory.
- Conrad (voiced by Brian Cox) is a former general contractor and Ace, Crunch and Thud's former owner. He helps Bob and the team build Spring City's new dam, but is very angry when Bob is given the job, so he attempts to sabotage the dam to ruin Bob's reputation and take over the build himself. He is defeated and sentenced to community service.
- Roland (voiced by Mathew Baynton in the UK and Brian Drummond in the US) is a man who works at the warehouse. Leo called him “Mr. Sweep” in “Boogie Woogie Wonderland”.
- Phil Lucas (voiced by Dustin Demri-Burns) is Brandon’s uncle who worked in the summer camp as a scoutmaster and a camp leader.
- Carl Parker (voiced by Phil Cornwell in the UK and Brian Drummond in the US) is the director at Spring City Studios.
- Sylvain de Souza (voiced by Dustin Demri-Burns) is a French star and dancer on the famous television show Ballroom Blitz and also a magician.

== Vehicles ==
=== Bob's vehicles ===
- Scoop (voiced by Rob Rackstraw in the UK and Alan Marriott in the original series and Project: Built It and by David Menkin in Ready, Steady, Build! in the US; also voiced by Blake Harrison in the reboot series) is a yellow backhoe loader, the first machine in Bob's team, and the unspoken leader of Bob's crew of construction machines. He has a habit of making jokes, and assists Bob in being in charge whenever extra help is needed. Scoop can sometimes be bossy and sarcastic, but he is kind and caring to others. His catchphrases are "I can dig it!", "I'm in charge!", "No prob, Bob." and "Can we fix/build it?" in the original series and "Aww...I've just had a BRILLIANT IDEA!!!" in the reboot series.
- Muck (voiced by Rob Rackstraw in the UK, Lachele Carl in the original series and Project: Build It, Sophie Aldred in Ready, Steady, Build! in the US; also voiced by Paul Panting in the UK and Vincent Tong in the US in the reboot series) is a red caterpillar-tracked combination of a bulldozer, dumper and dump truck with a blade (known as a tracked dumper) and the second machine of Bob's team. He is one of the heaviest machines on the team, so he becomes very clumsy. He is especially fond of getting dirty. His catchphrases are "I can dump it!", "Muck to the rescue!" and "Let's get mucky!" in the original series and "Oh, wow! I'd love to join in." in the reboot series. Muck is an amalgamation of various real machines. For example, he can shift material like a bulldozer, empty material like a dump truck, and can self load like a kubota tracked dumper or a garbage truck, and load and unload himself like a tractor scraper. He is the most versatile out of all of Bob's machines. He is also best friends with Scoop. Muck is the only character to have its gender switch between the UK and US dub in the original series, but was characterised as male in both versions of the reboot. In the US dub of the original series, Project: Built It and Ready, Steady, Build!, however, Muck is female.
- Lofty (voiced by Neil Morrissey in the UK, Sonya Leite in the original series, Emma Tate in Project: Build It and Lizzie Waterworth-Santo in Ready, Steady, Build! in the US; also voiced by Steven Kynman in the UK and Richard Ian Cox in the US in the reboot series) is a blue mobile crane who is the third machine of Bob's team, and the youngest besides Scratch. He lacks confidence, but can overcome this with the encouragement of the team. Despite his nervousness, he is a loyal friend and always gets his work done. His catchphrases are "I can lift it!" and "Er/Uh, yeah, I think so....", (usually said in response to the question "Can we fix it?") in the original series and "It's a good job well done." in the reboot series.
- Dizzy (voiced by Kate Harbour in the UK, Maria Darling in series 1-14 and Emma Tate in series 15-18 in the US; also voiced by Sarah Hadland in the UK and Claire Corlett in the US in the reboot series) is an orange cement mixer. The fourth machine of Bob's team, she is the only female (in most dubs) and one of the youngest machine in Bob's building yard. Dizzy is very eager, curious and easily excitable, and dances around the yard whenever she gets anxious, but she is also best friends with Pilchard. Her catchphrases are "I can mix it!" and "Brilliant!!" in the original series and "Pour to perfection!" in the reboot series.
- Roley (voiced by Neil Morrissey in the UK, Maria Darling from series 1-14 and Lorelei King from series 15-18 in the US; also voiced by Marcel McCalla in the UK and Ian James Corlett in the US in the reboot series) is a green road roller and the fifth machine of Bob's team. He loves to make up songs and frequently spins his eyes whenever he is excited. Roley is always energetic and rowdy, and usually does not think before he acts, which can lead to trouble. Roley is also friends with Lofty and Bird, who sleeps on his cab when he is steady, sometimes when working. His catchphrases are "I can roll it!" and "Rock and roll!! /Rockin' and a rollin'!!" in the original series and "The tarmac is flat!" in the reboot series.
- Benny (voiced by Emma Tate) is a small magenta compact tracked loader with a rear-end backhoe arm and an excavator arm. He first appeared in Snow Under: The Bobblesberg Winter Games, in which he helps Bob and the team prepare everything for the Bobblesberg Winter Games. He was later hired by Robert to help him out in Bobsville while the team were in Sunflower Valley. He looks up to Scoop and calls him "Big Banana", and his catchphrase is "Unreal, banana peel!" in reference to Scoop's yellow color.
- Scrambler (voiced by Rupert Degas) is a metallic blue Utility Hauler ATV who Bob wins in the Sunflower Valley design competition in Bobsville, and is the fastest machine on his team. Scrambler is extremely energetic and loves to go off-roading and make deliveries. He is the only machine in the team that is not a construction vehicle. He can sometimes be mischievous and impatient, but always learns his lessons in the end.
- Scratch (voiced by Kate Harbour in the UK and Jo Wyatt in the US) is a small light blue skid-steer loader who is the youngest member of the team. He is very curious, eager, slightly childish and very naive, and still has to learn to stand up for himself and ask others for help.

=== Farmer Pickles' vehicles ===
- Travis (voiced by Rob Rackstraw in the UK and Alan Marriott in the original series and Project: Build It and David Menkin in Ready, Steady, Build! in the US) is a turquoise tractor who is often seen hauling a wood sided trailer. He helps out Bob and the team when they need it and keeps an eye on Spud. Travis is very intelligent, careful and never complains about a job. However, he is somewhat naive and sometimes falls for Spud's pranks. Like Scoop, Travis has an exhaust pipe, which is red and on top of his radiator. He is very good at whistling, and often makes a whistling noise through his pipe. His catchphrases are "Okay, Farmer Pickles.", "Travis Tractor's my name, moving loads is my game.", "Don't be silly, Spud.", and "I'd better get going!"
- Sumsy (voiced by Kate Harbour in the UK and Emma Tate in the US) is a maroon forklift lorry who works at the sunflower factory and looks almost identical to Trix. Her catchphrase is "I can pack 'em, I can stack 'em!"
- Packer (voiced by Rob Rackstraw in the UK and Lorelei King in the US) is a red semi-trailer lorry who uses three trailers: a flatbed, a covered trailer and a low loader, to make deliveries all over Sunflower Valley and later Fixham Harbour. His catchphrases are "Fetch/pick up and deliver! Fetch/pick up and deliver!" and "Pack me up and watch me go-go!"

=== J.J.'s vehicles ===
- Skip (voiced by Colin McFarlane in the UK and William Dufris in the original series and Rupert Degas in Project: Build It in the US) is a lime green skip lorry.
- Trix (voiced by Llewella Gideon in the UK and Lorelei King in the US) is a violet forklift lorry who occasionally helps Bob, Wendy and the machines.

=== Bobland Bay vehicles ===
- Tumbler (voiced by Rupert Degas in the UK and Vincent Marzello in the US) is a large light orange cement mixer truck, who is very loud and, due to his large size, thinks he is strong, brave, and tough. Tumbler is very prideful and tends to brag about his size a lot, but he has a gentle side, which he shows to his friends, particularly Dizzy.
- Flex (voiced by Rupert Degas in the UK and Vincent Marzello in the US) is a light yellow Northern Irish-accented cherry picker who has an extensive knowledge of plants and loves horticulture.
- Bristle (voiced by Rupert Degas in the UK and Marc Silk in the US) is a silver and dark blue rubbish sweeper who is very eager to help out the others by doing jobs, often ahead of the team. He also whistles frequently and is a neat freak.
- Gripper (voiced by Rupert Degas) and Grabber (voiced by Rob Rackstraw) are twin Scouse-accented (Southern Drawled in the US) machines. Gripper is a dark orange and dark green crawler crane and Grabber is a dark green and dark orange excavator with a clamshell bucket. Gripper and Grabber refer to the other characters as "mates" ("partners" in the US) mainly due to stereotypical behaviors. They first appeared in the special Race to the Finish, in which they help Bob and the team build Sunflower Valley's new sports stadium. In Ready, Steady, Build!, they work at the suppliers yard in Fixham Harbour.
- Splasher (voiced by Rob Rackstraw) is a yellow and blue Australian-accented amphibious car who takes people to and from the Bobland Bay hotel and gives them tours in the valley.

=== Snow vehicles ===
- Scoot (voiced by Maria Darling) is Tom's yellow snowmobile who only appears in the special A Christmas to Remember.
- Zoomer (voiced by Rupert Degas) is a purple snowmobile who first appears in Snowed Under: The Bobblesberg Winter Games, in which he helps Bob and the team get everything ready for the Bobblesberg Winter Games. He is later brought to Sunflower Valley to help the team on snowy days.

=== Trucks ===
- Dodger (voiced by Rob Rackstraw in the UK and Alan Marriott in the US) is a white and blue pickup truck who has a crane arm that lifts the milk. His horn makes very strange honking sounds that everyone finds funny. His catchphrase is "Dodger delivers!"
- Jackaroo (voiced by Donny Osmond) is a blue pickup truck who only appears in the special Built to Be Wild.

=== Other ===
- R.Vee (voiced by Rob Rackstraw in the UK and Marc Silk in the US) is a blue cargo van and Robert and Dot's mobile workshop who only appears in the special Scrambler to the Rescue.
- Rubble (voiced by Rupert Degas in the UK and Marc Silk in the US) is an intelligent gold haul truck who only appears in the special The Big Dino Dig.

=== 2015 Reboot ===
==== Construction vehicles ====
- Stretch (voiced by Sam Swann in the UK and Peter New in the US) is a teal excavator. His catchphrase is "I'm ready to work, Bob. Anytime, anywhere, any place."
- Rocky (voiced by Rasmus Hardiker) is a white skid-steer loader who help Bob and the team with an obstacle course for animals.

==== Mega Machines ====
- Tiny (voiced by Terry Mynott in the UK and Lee Tockar in the US) is a giant, yellow tower crane. His catchphrase is "Time for some Tower Power!"
- Ace (voiced by Ben Miles in the UK and Brian Drummond in the US) is a giant, orange front loader. He originally belongs to Conrad, before Bob takes him in. His catchphrase is "Let's do this!"
- Crunch (voiced by Brian Cox in Mega Machines, an Dustin Demri-Burns in the series) is a giant, white caterpillar-tracked excavator who communicates with grunting sounds. He originally belongs to Conrad, before Bob takes him in.
- Thud (voiced by Dustin Demri-Burns in the UK and Brian Dobson in the US) is a giant, dark blue haul truck. He originally belongs to Conrad, before Bob takes him in.
- Norm (voiced by Dustin Demri-Burns) is a giant, light blue roadheader whose only spoken dialogue is "Dig, Dig, Tunnel, Tunnel!"

==== Trucks ====
- Two-Tonne (voiced by Terry Mynott in the UK and Richard Newman in the US) is a big, 40 ton, deep navy blue tractor unit trailer truck. He has four trailers, a truck camper with a detachable mobile home and an attachable crane boom, a low loader used for carrying things as well as Stretch, a cement mixer and a dumper used for construction work. His catchphrase is "You can depend on me, Bob."
- Alfred (voiced by Phil Cornwell in the UK and Vincent Tong in the US) is Curtis' white and red tow truck who sometimes gets overexcited, such as when Leo plays video games. His catchphrase is "It's really fantastic, actually!"
- Betsy (voiced by Sarah Hadland in the UK and Rebecca Shoichet in the US) is a turquoise and white minibus who drives around the Spring City Rockets. Her catchphrase is "Come on, jump in, Rockets!"
- Tread (voiced by Dustin Demri-Burns in the UK and Matt Hill in the US) is an orange pickup truck who is cheerful and trusty. His catchphrase is "I love being busy!", only in the UK.
- Shifter (voiced by Lucy Montgomery in the UK and Sam Vincent in the US) is a lime green piggyback forklift truck who causes lots of chaos with his energetic enthusiasm. His catchphrase is "If you want it shifted, call for Shifter!"
- Picksy (voiced by Teresa Gallagher) is a red cherry picker whom Lofty has a crush on.

==== Other ====
- Philip (voiced by Steve Cannon) is a navy blue limousine who drives around Mayor Madison and Mr. Bentley. He loves his job and takes it very seriously.

== Animals ==
=== Main ===
- Pilchard (voiced by Kate Harbour) is Bob's pet cat. She often finds herself in problematic situations, like making her way into the middle of a construction job, which may or may not be on purpose, but she is also best friends with Dizzy.
- Bird (voiced by Kate Harbour) is a blue and red songbird who is Roley's best friend. He is often found perched on Roley's roof.
- Scruffty (voiced by Neil Morrissey) is Farmer Pickles' pet dog who lives on his farm.
- Gull is a seagull who is Scoop's best friend.

=== Recurring ===
- Finn is Bob's pet goldfish who likes to swim around in a fish tank.
- Tommy is Mrs. Potts' pet tortoise, who has had him since she was a little girl.
- Squawk is a crow who likes to tease Spud a lot.
- Hamish (voiced by Rob Rackstraw in the UK and Alan Marriott in the US) is J.J.'s (formerly Mr. Fothergill's) pet parrot who likes to repeat what he hears people say.
- Humpty is Farmer Pickles' prize pig.
- Pogo (voiced by Stephen Tompkinson) is Tom's pet husky.
- Sprat (voiced by Rupert Degas) is Rupert Reekie's pet cat and Pilchard's love interest, who only appears in the episode "Roley the Green Cat".
- Fox Cub (voiced by Kate Harbour) is a fox who Roley befriends.
- Cooper is a dog that Tilly looks after. Like Scruffty, he loves to chase Pilchard.
- Stripy (voiced by Kate Harbour) is a female tiger shark pup who becomes Scoop's pet in "Scoop's Pet Shark".

== Miscellaneous ==
- Spud (voiced by Rob Rackstraw in the UK, the US version starting Project Build It! and Ready Steady Build! dubs and Alan Marriott in the US version of the original series) is a scarecrow who lives with Farmer Pickles. He has a big appetite and a mischievous personality, yet he often manages to have a heart of gold. It is unknown how he came to life. Spud is the only character in the series who is neither a human, animal nor vehicle. His catchphrases are "Spud's on the job!", "Oh, yes, yes, yessity yes!!!" and "Yes, Bob, sorry, Bob."
