= David Meara =

British Anglican priest (born 1947)

David Gwynne Meara, FSA (born 30 June 1947) is a British Anglican priest. From 2009 to 2014, he was Archdeacon of London in the Church of England. He is known as an authority on Victorian and modern monumental brasses.

== Early life and education ==
Meara was born on 30 June 1947. He was educated at Merchant Taylors' School, Northwood, Oriel College, Oxford and Ripon College Cuddesdon.

== Ordained ministry ==
Meara was ordained in 1973. He began his ordained ministry as a curate at Christchurch, Reading, after which he was a chaplain at the University of Reading. He was vicar of Basildon from 1982 to 1994 and then the Rural Dean of Bradfield. He was Rector of St Bride's Fleet Street from 2000 to August 2014.

== Author ==
As an author his writings include The Foundation of St Augustine at Reading, 1982; Victorian Memorial Brasses, 1983; A. W. N. Pugin and the Revival of Memorial Brasses, 1991; and Modern Memorial Brasses, 2008.

== Personal life ==
He lives with his wife, Rosemary, just outside Oxford.

== Honours ==
Meara was elected a Fellow of the Society of Antiquaries of London in 1994. He is a Liveryman of the Worshipful Company of Stationers and Newspaper Makers, the Worshipful Company of Marketors and of the Worshipful Company of Turners.

Church of England titles
Preceded by Peter Delaney	Archdeacon of London; 2009–2014	Succeeded by Nick Mercer
