= St Paul's Church, Camden Square =

Church in North London, England

Coordinates: 51.5457°N 0.1308°W

- St Paul's Church, Camden Square
- Denomination: Church of England
- Website: http://www.posp.co.uk/st-pauls/

History
- Founded: 1849; 177 years ago

Administration
- Province: Canterbury
- Diocese: London
- Archdeaconry: Hampstead
- Deanery: South Camden
- Parish: Old St Pancras

Clergy
- Vicar: Fr Owen Dobson

St Paul's Church is a church dedicated to Paul the Apostle on Camden Square in Camden, north London. It is called St Paul's because the estate was owned originally by the canons of St Paul's Cathedral.

It was built in 1849 to designs by Frederick W. Ordish and John Johnson. The builder, John Kelk (later knighted) built the Albert Memorial.

The church was severely damaged in the Second World War and replaced with a single-storey church hall building which, though meant to be temporary, still houses the church's congregation at one end. Plans for a replacement were put forward in July 2008, incorporating the hall as well as new social housing and worship area. From 2003 to 2023 it and its parish formed part of the St Pancras team of parishes, which also included St Pancras Old Church, St Michael's Church, Camden Town, and St Mary's Church, Somers Town - all four are now independent parishes again.

== Notable people ==
- T. J. Crawford, organist from 1899 to 1902
