= St Mary's Church, Somers Town =

Church in London

Coordinates: 51°31′53″N 0°8′5″W

- Church of St Mary
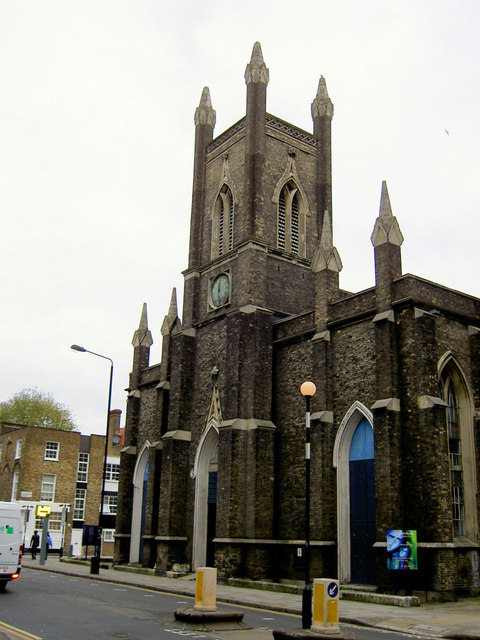
- St Mary's Church in Somers Town
- St Mary's Church, Somers Town
- Country: England
- Denomination: Church of England
- Churchmanship: Traditional Catholic
- Website: http://www.posp.co.uk/st-marys/

Administration
- Diocese: London
- Archdeaconry: Hampstead
- Deanery: South Camden
- Parish: Old St Pancras

Clergy
- Vicar(s): Fr Paschal Worton SSC

Listed Building – Grade II
- Official name: Church of St Mary The Virgin, Eversholt Street
- Designated: 10 June 1954
- Reference no.: 1342049

St Mary's Church is a Church of England church on Eversholt Street in Somers Town, in the London Borough of Camden.

== History ==
It was designed by Henry William Inwood as a chapel of ease for St Pancras Old Church (which resumed being a parish in its own right in 1852) and built between 1824 and 1827 by I. T. Seabrook. A Parliamentary grant paid for the construction, though local taxation funded the purchases of the chapel's interior decoration and the site itself. It was consecrated on 11 March 1826 and soon afterwards it became famous for converting several local people from Roman Catholicism there.

Early on, the chapel was known as "Mr. Judkin's Chapel" or "Seymour Street Chapel" and was attended during his schooldays by Charles Dickens, who was then living nearby with his family at 13 Cranleigh Street. Augustus Pugin satirised the chapel's architecture, comparing it with Bishop Skirlaw's Chapel. The interior was the subject of two schemes, the 1874 one of J K Colling and the 1890 one of R C Reade—in the latter, traceried transoms were added to the windows and the west gallery taken out. In 1888 a chancel was added and the side galleries removed.

It was designated a Grade II listed building on 10 June 1954.

=== Modern day ===
From 2003 to 2023 it formed part of the Old St Pancras Team Ministry (which also included St Michael's Church, Camden Town, St Pancras Old Church and St Paul's Church, Camden Square - all four are now independent parishes again).

== Notable clergy ==
- Basil Jellicoe was Missioner at the Magdalen College Mission which operated in Somers Town in association with the parish.
- Rob Wickham curate from 2001 to 2003; later Bishop of Edmonton
