= Faith in the City =

1985 report by the Archbishop of Canterbury's Commission on Urban Priority Areas

Faith in the City: A Call for Action by Church and Nation was a report published in the United Kingdom in autumn 1985, authored by the Archbishop of Canterbury Robert Runcie's Commission on Urban Priority Areas. The report created a large amount of controversy when it was published, as one of its conclusions was that much of the blame for growing spiritual and economic poverty in British inner cities was due to government policies.

== Origin of the report ==
According to the report's authors, the archbishop's special commission was established with the following aim:

To examine the strengths, insights, problems and needs of the Church's life and mission in Urban Priority Areas and, as a result, to reflect on the challenge which God may be making to Church and Nation: and to make recommendations to appropriate bodies.

== Report recommendations ==
The report made 61 recommendations: 38 of them to the Church of England, and 23 to the government and nation. The church was asked to identify its "urban priority area" parishes, according to Department for the Environment indicators relating to 1981 census data. The six indicators were: levels of unemployment, overcrowding, households lacking basic amenities, pensioners living alone, ethnic origin, and single parent households.

It was to pay attention to clergy staffing levels; to adequate training programmes for ordained and lay leaders; to liturgical needs; to styles of work with children and young people; to the use of its buildings. It was also to look at its work in industrial mission, social services, social responsibility, church schools and education.

The Recommendations to Government and Nation were specific – taking in the Rate Support Grant, the Urban Programme, levels of overtime working, Community Programmes, Supplementary Benefit, Child Benefit, the taxation system, ethnic records and housing availability and allocation, homelessness, "care in the community", Law Centres and law enforcement.

== Reaction and legacy ==
When the report was published it caused immediate controversy. An unnamed Conservative cabinet minister was reported as dismissing the report – before it was published – as "pure Marxist theology" and another Conservative MP claimed the report proved that the Anglican church was governed by a "load of Communist clerics". Prime Minister Margaret Thatcher, a Methodist, told her friend Woodrow Wyatt that "There's nothing about self-help or doing anything for yourself in the report" and lamented that the report focused on state action. According to the then Bishop of Liverpool, David Sheppard, although the report was loudly "rubbished" by some senior Conservative politicians, these attacks had the benefit of making "Faith in the City" famous.

The Chief Rabbi of Britain, Immanuel Jakobovits, published a response to the report titled From Doom to Hope: A Jewish view of "Faith in the City". Jakobovits argued that the Jewish contribution to eradicating poverty "would lay greater emphasis on building up self-respect by encouraging ambition and enterprise through a more demanding and more satisfying work-ethic, which is designed to eliminate human idleness and to nurture pride in 'eating the toil of one's hands' as the first immediate targets". Jakobovits also said that black people should not look to the state but instead to themselves and take responsibility for their poverty. He argued that they should learn from the Jewish experience of working themselves out of poverty, educating themselves and building up a "trust in and respect for the police, realising that our security as a minority depended on law and order being maintained". Jakobovits criticised Faith in the City for not mentioning the role of trade unions, arguing that "The selfishness of workers in attempting to secure better conditions at the cost of rising unemployment and immense public misery can be just as morally indefensible as the rapaciousness of the wealthy in exploiting the working class"

The report triggered extensive public and media debate regarding Thatcherite ethics, urban decay, the modern role and relevance of the church, and the perceived growing divide between rich and poor in 1980s Britain.

One of the most visible legacies of the report followed its recommendation number 25, which stated "A Church Urban Fund should be established to strengthen the Church's presence and promote the Christian witness in the urban priority areas." The Church of England created this fund in 1988, subsequently raising and distributing more than £55 million to faith-related initiatives across the country.

According to George Cassidy, Bishop of Southwell and Nottingham, in a speech to the House of Lords made in 2005, a less immediately obvious legacy of the Faith in the City report can also be ascertained. He opined that, although the report focused on urban areas, the message of the report "was, and to a great extent remains, universal" – prompting the Church of England to make similar work in looking at problems in non-urban areas. The successful model for links, dialogue and cooperation between faith organisations and urban local communities in the wake of the report and the establishment of the Church Urban Fund were mirrored later in rural areas, following the recommendations in the subsequent report, Faith in the Countryside. According to the bishop, in the same speech, this

... enabled, for example, parish-based ministry, working with others in local communities, to respond quickly and by all accounts effectively when many such communities were traumatised by blows such as BSE, foot-and-mouth disease and swine fever. ... The substantial body of evidence and commentary drawn together 20 years ago in the Faith in the City report ... continue to be the subject of work and engagement right up to the present day.

A tribute to the positive results of the Faith in the City report was also provided by the Dean of Norwich, Graham Smith, in a civic service in June 2005:

At one level it provided the churches of the inner city with a voice, and the voice was to articulate what was being felt and experienced by some of the poorest and most dis-advantaged communities in Britain ...

Faith in the City began a movement which was partly political (with a small p), partly theological and partly spiritual. In all three senses, it was a beacon of hope to a lot of people: local authorities felt that the dilemmas that they faced with limited resources in the face of overwhelming deprivation were being recognised; the churches on the ground felt that the rest of the Church was waking up to the realities of inner city ministry; and, most important of all, people who were locked into the poverty trap of deprived inner city communities began to feel that perhaps there could be a national understanding of the paralysis which gripped them. Faith in the City began a discussion across the nation and a movement within the Church. It showed that our common concerns could be harnessed in the common good.

In 2003, the Commission on Urban Life and Faith was established to report on the twentieth anniversary of Faith in the City on the new contexts and challenges that exist in towns and cities. The report, Faithful Cities, was published in May 2006.

== Authors of the report ==
- Sir Richard O'Brien (Chairman)
- David Sheppard (Bishop of Liverpool)
- Wilfred Wood (Bishop of Croydon)
- Alan Billings (Vicar of St Mary’s, Walkley, Sheffield and Deputy Leader, Sheffield City Council)
- David Booth (Executive Director, BICC plc)
- John Burn (Headmaster of Longbenton High School, North Tyneside)
- Andrew Hake (Social Development Officer, Borough of Thamesdown)
- A. H. Halsey (Director of Barnett House and Fellow of Nuffield College, Oxford)
- Anthony Harvey (Canon of Westminster)
- Ron Keating (Assistant General Secretary, National Union of Public Employees)
- Ruth McCurry (Teacher in Hackney; Clergy wife)
- R. E. Pahl (Research Professor in Sociology, University of Kent at Canterbury)
- John F. Pickering (Professor of Industrial Economics, University of Manchester Institute of Science and Technology)
- Robina Rafferty (Assistant Director, Catholic Housing Aid Society)
- Mano Rumalshah (Priest-in-charge, St George's, Southall)
- Linbert Spencer (Chief Executive, Project Fullemploy)
- Mary Sugden (Principal, National Institute for Social Work)
- Barry Thorley (Vicar of St Matthew's, Brixton)
- Secretary: John N. Pearson (HM Civil Service, seconded from the Department of the Environment)

== See also ==
- Robert Runcie, the Archbishop of Canterbury at the time of the report
- Sermon on the Mound, a speech often seen as Thatcher's response to Faith in the City
