= Hubert Matthews =

Hubert John Matthews
- Archdeacon of Hampstead
- Church: Church of England
- Diocese: Diocese of London
- In office: 1950–1961
- Other post: Archdeacon Emeritus (1961–1971)
- Previous posts: Vicar of St Marylebone (1942–1954); Vicar of St Jude's, South Kensington (1930–1942); Vicar of Christ Church, Kensington (1925–1930); Vicar of All Hallows, East India Docks (1921–1925)

Personal details
- Born: 18 June 1889
- Died: 28 April 1971 (aged 81)
- Denomination: Anglican
- Education: Winchester College; St John's College, Oxford; Ripon College Cuddesdon
- [[Pope Chaplain to the Grocers' Company; Rural Dean of Marylebone; Prebendary of St Paul's Cathedral; Chaplain to the Order of St John of Jerusalem (disambiguation)|Other popes named Chaplain to the Grocers' Company; Rural Dean of Marylebone; Prebendary of St Paul's Cathedral; Chaplain to the Order of St John of Jerusalem]]

Hubert John Matthews (18 June 1889 – 28 April 1971) was archdeacon of Hampstead from 1950 to 1961; and then archdeacon Emeritus until his death.

Matthews was educated at Winchester College and St John's College, Oxford. Matthews originally intended to pursue a legal career; and was articled to Ellis Peirs & Co.in 1911. By 1913, however, he was at Ripon College Cuddesdon preparing for ordination. He began his ecclesiastical career with a curate at St Martin-in-the-Fields then a Naval chaplain aboard HMS Malaya. He was vicar of All Hallows, East India Docks from 1921 to 1925; and then of Christ Church, Kensington from 1925 to 1930; St Jude's, South Kensington, 1930 to 1942; of St Marylebone from 1942 to 1954; and then of St Andrew Undershaft, 1954 to 1962. He was also at various times chaplain to the Grocers' Company, rural dean of Marylebone; a prebendary of St Paul's Cathedral, and Chaplain to the Order of St John of Jerusalem.

== Notes ==
Church of England titles
| Preceded by Charles Edmund Lambert | Archdeacon of Hampstead; 1912–1920 | Succeeded by Graham Leonard |
