= Faithful Cities =

2006 Church of England urban life report

Faithful Cities was a report on urban life by the Church of England, produced by the Commission on Urban Life and Faith. Its findings were launched by John Sentamu, Archbishop of York, and Rowan Williams, Archbishop of Canterbury, at St Michael's Church, Camden Town, London, in May 2006. It was widely seen as the successor to the 1980s Faith in the City report. Its conclusions were being enacted by the Church's first Bishop for Urban Life and Faith, Stephen Lowe, Bishop of Hulme (a suffragan bishop in the Diocese of Manchester).
