= Hubert Pink (priest) =

Archdeacon of Hampstead from 1964 to 1974

Hubert Arthur Stanley Pink (22 January 1905 – 22 December 1976) was Archdeacon of Hampstead from 1964 to 1974.

Pink was educated at Ipswich School, Selwyn College Cambridge and Westcott House Cambridge. He was ordained in 1929 and began his career as Chaplain of his old school. He was Vicar of Canvey Island from 1935 to 1938; Rector of Little Ilford from 1938 to 1945; Director of Religious Education for the Diocese of Chelmsford from 1945 to 1947; general secretary for the National Society for Promoting Religious Education from 1947 to 1951; Rector of Hackney from 1951 to 1965; and then of St Andrew Undershaft from 1965 to 1974. He was also Examining Chaplain to the Bishop of London from 1964 to 1973.

== Notes ==
Church of England titles
Preceded by Graham Leonard	Archdeacon of Hampstead; 1964–1974	Succeeded by Fred Pickering
