= Alan Rogers (bishop) =

British bishop

The Right Reverend Alan Rogers
- Bishop of Edmonton
- Church: Church of England
- Diocese: Diocese of London
- In office: 1970–1975
- Successor: Bill Westwood
- Other posts: Bishop of Mauritius (1959–1966); Bishop of Fulham (1966–1970)

Orders
- Consecration: 1959

Personal details
- Born: Alan Francis Bright Rogers; 12 September 1907
- Died: 16 October 2003 (aged 96)
- Denomination: Anglican
- Education: Westminster City School

Alan Francis Bright Rogers (12 September 1907 – 16 October 2003) was an Anglican bishop who held three different posts in an ecclesiastical career spanning over half a century.

Educated at Westminster City School, trained for the priesthood at King's College London and ordained in 1932, he began his career with a curacy at St Stephen's, Shepherd's Bush. From 1934 he served the Anglican Church in Mauritius, firstly as a missionary priest then as Archdeacon of Mauritius. Returning to England he became Vicar of Twickenham followed by a spell as Rural Dean of Hampstead before appointment to the episcopate as Bishop of Mauritius in 1959. Translated to become Bishop of Fulham (a suffragan bishop of the Diocese of London with delegated responsibility from the Bishop of London for northern and central Europe) in 1966, his final appointment was a sideways move to become Bishop of Edmonton (another suffragan bishop of that Diocese, but actually ministering there) four years later. That See was erected on 29 May 1970 in order to supervise a new district of the diocese created by the experimental area scheme that year.

In retirement he continued to serve the church as an honorary assistant bishop (in the Diocese of Peterborough and then the Kensington area of the London diocese) for a further quarter of a century.

Church of England titles
Preceded by Hugh Otter-Barry	Bishop of Mauritius; 1959–1966	Succeeded by Edwin Curtis
Preceded by Roderic Coote	Bishop of Fulham; 1966–1970	Succeeded by John Satterthwaite
New title	Bishop of Edmonton; 1970–1975	Succeeded by Bill Westwood
