= Bishop of Edmonton (London) =

English episcopal title

The Bishop of Edmonton is an episcopal title used by an area bishop of the Church of England Diocese of London in the Province of Canterbury, England. The title takes its name after Edmonton, an area in the North of the London Borough of Enfield; the See was erected under the Suffragans Nomination Act 1888 by Order in Council dated 29 May 1970.

The See was erected in order to take oversight of a new fourth suffragan area (initially the deaneries of North and South Camden, Central and West Barnet, East and West Haringey, and Enfield) created by the diocese's 1970 experimental area scheme; bishops suffragan of Edmonton have been area bishops since the London area scheme was founded in 1979. On 20 December 2023 it was announced by the Diocese of London that the role would be filled in 2024 by Anderson Jeremiah, who was Associate Dean at Lancaster University and a priest in the Diocese of Blackburn. Jeremiah duly took up his See with his consecration on 25 April 2024, by Justin Welby, Archbishop of Canterbury, at Canterbury Cathedral.

The episcopal title of "Bishop of Edmonton" is one of three that are duplicated in the Anglican Communion. The other Bishop of Edmonton is a diocesan bishop in Canada.

== List of bishops ==
Bishops of Edmonton
From	Until	Incumbent	Notes
1970	1975	Alan Rogers	(1907-2003)
1975	1984	Bill Westwood	(1925-1999). First area bishop from 1979; translated to Peterborough
1985	1998	Brian Masters	(1932-1998). Died in office. Formerly Bishop of Fulham
March 1999	31 December 2014	Peter Wheatley	(b. 1947). Formerly Archdeacon of Hampstead; retired at the end of 2014
2014	2015	Pete Broadbent, area Bishop of Willesden	acting area bishop
23 September 2015	9 July 2023	Rob Wickham	Resigned to become CEO of Church Urban Fund
25 April 2024	present	Anderson Jeremiah	
