= Charles Lambert (Archdeacon of Hampstead) =

British Anglican priest (1872–1954)

- Archdeacon of Hampstead
- Diocese: Diocese of London
- In office: 1920–1950
- Predecessor: Brook Deedes
- Successor: Hubert Matthews
- Other posts: Principal, Clergy Training School (1911–1917); Vicar of All Hallows-by-the-Tower (1917–1922); Rector of St James's Piccadilly (1922–1950) archdeacon emeritus (1950–1954)

Orders
- Ordination: Lent 1898 (deacon); 1900 (priest)

Personal details
- Born: 4 April 1872
- Died: 1 April 1954 (aged 81)
- Denomination: Anglican
- Parents: William Lambert & Marie Bennet
- Spouse: Helena Ellison
- Children: Two sons, one daughter
- Occupation: preacher, author
- Education: Christ's College, Cambridge

Charles Edmund Lambert (4 April 1872 – 1 April 1954) was a British Anglican priest who served as Principal of the Clergy Training School (now Westcott House, Cambridge) and as Archdeacon of Hampstead.

== Early life and family ==
Born the son of William Lambert of Banstead and Marie Bennet, Lambert was schooled at Newcastle High School before going as a scholar to Christ's College, Cambridge, where he read the Classical Tripos, graduating Bachelor of Arts (BA) in 1894 and proceeding Master of Arts (Cambridge) (MA Cantab) in 1898. He trained for ministry at Salisbury Theological College.

In 1927, he married Helena Mary Ellison, elder daughter of John Henry Joshua Ellison (1855–1944; rector of St Michael, Cornhill and prebendary of St Paul's), and they had two sons and one daughter.

== Ministry ==
Lambert was made a deacon by William Boyd Carpenter, Bishop of Ripon in Ripon Cathedral in the Lent ordinations of March 1898 and served his title as assistant curate of Leeds, being ordained priest in 1900. He became domestic chaplain to William Maclagan, Archbishop of York, in 1901, moving to become sub-warden of the Bishop's Hostel and Tutor of the Scholae Cancellarii, Lincoln in 1904 and holding licence to preach in that diocese.

In 1911, he became Principal of the Clergy Training School (now Westcott House, Cambridge) until 1917, when he became both Vicar of All Hallows-by-the-Tower and Warden of the Mission College of All Hallows. He had become an examining chaplain to John Harmer, Bishop of Rochester in 1914 and to Frederick Ridgeway, Bishop of Salisbury in 1919. He additionally became Archdeacon of Hampstead and an examining chaplain to Arthur Winnington-Ingram, Bishop of London, in 1920, both of which roles he retained when he moved from All Hallows to become Rector of St James's Piccadilly in 1922. He served as chaplain to Winnington-Ingram's successors Geoffrey Fisher and William Wand until his retirement from all three roles in 1949/50; he was given the honorary title of archdeacon emeritus upon his retirement.

He was Select Preacher to the University of Cambridge in 1913, 1917, 1930 and 1941; his devotional address from the Pan-Anglican Congress, 1908 was published; he edited the Letters of Herbert Hammond Jeaffreson (1916); and wrote Life in the Spirit (1951). He was a member of the Athenæum Club.

== Sources ==
- "Lambert, Charles Edmund". Who's Who & Who Was Who. Vol. 1920–2016 (April 2014 online ed.). A & C Black. (Subscription or UK public library membership required.)
- "Lambert, Charles Edmund (LMRT891CE)". A Cambridge Alumni Database. University of Cambridge.
