= Brook Deedes =

Anglican priest

Brooke Deedes (12 January 1847 – 28 October 1922) was an Anglican priest in the last three decades of the 19th century and the first three of the 20th.

He was born in Sandling Park, Kent, the son of William Deedes senior, M.P. and younger brother of William Deedes junior, M.P. He was educated at Harrow and Christ Church, Oxford; and ordained in 1871. After a curacy at St Mary, Charterhouse Square he was Vicar of St Crispin, Bermondsey then Chaplain to the Bishop of Calcutta. He then served at Allahabad from 1885 to 1892 when he became the Archdeacon of Lucknow He was the incumbent at Hawkhurst from 1897 to 1900; Hampstead from 1900 to 1912; and St Vedast, Foster Lane from 1912 to 1920. He was also the inaugural Archdeacon of Hampstead, serving from 1912 to 1920.

Deedes died on 28 October 1922.

Church of England titles
| Preceded by Inaugural incumbent | Archdeacon of Hampstead; 1912 – 1920 | Succeeded by Charles Edmund Lambert |
