= Royal Wardrobe =

Former building in the City of London

Coordinates: 51.5126°N 0.1009°W

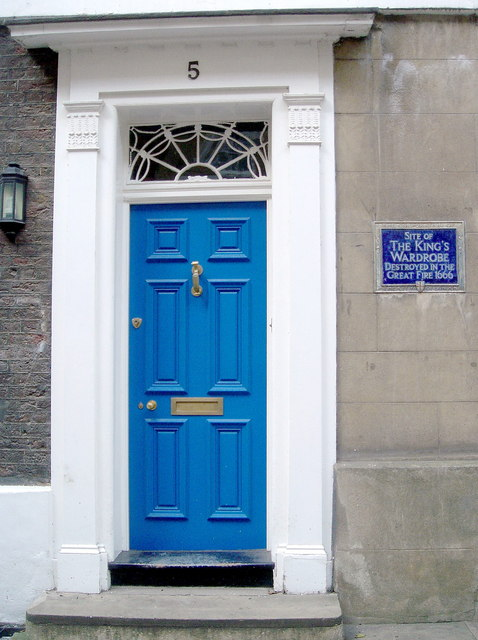
Plaque marking the site of the King's Wardrobe in Wardrobe Place EC4

The Royal Wardrobe (also known as the King's Wardrobe) was a building located between Carter Lane and St Andrew's Church, just to the north of what is now Queen Victoria Street in the City of London, near Blackfriars. It was used as a storehouse for royal accoutrements, housing arms and clothing among other personal items of the Crown.

== History ==
The Royal Wardrobe was not, first and foremost, a building, but a department of the Royal Household (and later a Department of State) in medieval and early modern England.

The building in Blackfriars was a 14th-century house sold to King Edward III shortly after the death of its owner in 1359. It served primarily as a storehouse for the king's state and ceremonial robes, as well as those pertaining to members of the Royal Family and Household, to ambassadors, ministers, Knights of the Garter and various other office-holders. Cloths and hangings, as used at coronations, funerals and other occasions of state, were also kept here; as were items such as beds and other furnishings for royal and official use. These items had previously been kept in the Tower of London, but space there was increasingly in demand for storage of arms, armour and ammunition (all of which was also in the keeping of the Wardrobe). The Wardrobe was also responsible for keeping the accounts of the Royal Household; this work too was undertaken at Blackfriars, and it was there that the books were kept.

The Wardrobe was used to house orphans during the Commonwealth of England. Samuel Pepys records that a party of children sang to Edward Montagu, 1st Earl of Sandwich when he was appointed as Master of the Royal Wardrobe during the Restoration but he was unmoved, the orphans were evicted, and the Wardrobe resumed its usual function.

The Royal Wardrobe was destroyed in the Great Fire of London in 1666 and was not rebuilt on the same site, but relocated, first to Buckingham Street in the Savoy, and later, again, to Great Queen Street.

The building's legacy survives in the street names Wardrobe Terrace and Wardrobe Place, built on the site of the Wardrobe, and in the curious designation of the nearby church, St. Andrew-by-the-Wardrobe (also destroyed in the fire, but built anew by Sir Christopher Wren).
