= St Michael's Church, Camden Town =

Coordinates: 51.5401°N 0.1415°W

- Parish Church of Camden Town
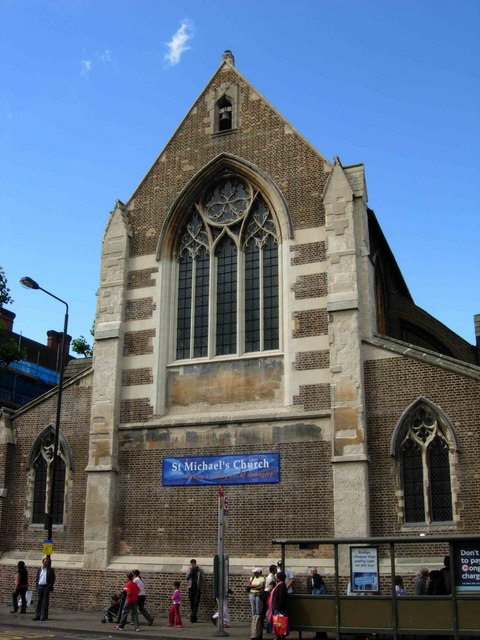
- West end of St Michael's.
- St Michael's Church, Camden Town
- Location: Camden Road, London NW 1.
- Country: England
- Denomination: Church of England
- Churchmanship: Anglo-Catholic
- Website: http://www.posp.co.uk/st-michaels/

History
- Founded: 1877
- Founder: Fr E.B Penfold
- Dedicated: 29.9.1881

Architecture
- Architect: Bodley and Garner
- Style: Neo-Gothic
- Years built: 1880-1894

Administration
- Diocese: London
- Archdeaconry: Hampstead
- Deanery: South Camden
- Parish: Old St Pancras

Clergy
- Bishop: Rt Revd Sarah Mullally
- Vicar: Fr Michael Thomas Abby Oshodi

St Michael's Church is the principal Church of England Parish Church for Camden Town in north central London. The present building, built in the late 19th century, was designed by George Frederick Bodley and Thomas Garner in a Gothic Revival style.

== History ==
Saint Michael's began as a church planting mission in 1877 under the direction of Father Edward Bainbridge Penfold. The congregation first met for Mass at 5A Camden Road, a few doors away from the current church in a building which now houses a betting shop. A service was celebrated in the shop to begin the celebrations for the parish's 125th anniversary in 2002. The church was named in remembrance of the church of St Michael Queenhithe, demolished in 1876 to fund the Camden mission.

The present building was the first London church designed by Bodley and Garner and is built of brick with stone dressings in the decorated Gothic style. The nave, begun in 1880, was consecrated by Bishop Walsham How on Michaelmas 1881. The chancel and the north chapel were added between 1892 and 1894 and consecrated by William Temple Bishop of London, later Archbishop of Canterbury. A north west tower was planned but never built. The west front was restored in 2005 and a new roof was completed in August 2007. There is a small community garden next to the church with a War Memorial.

The interior has a continuous, stenciled waggon ceiling covering both nave and chancel. The high altar in the chancel is surmounted by a stenciled reredos depicting the Risen Christ with seven lamps hanging above. There is also a threefold Sedilia in the south wall of the Sanctuary. The north chapel has a stone quadripartite ribbed vaulted ceiling and an Easter Sepulchre. The South Aisle contains the organ and a side chapel at the east end, a Calvary Scene and a shrine of Our Lady of Walsingham. A set of fourteen Stations of the Cross surround the nave in both the north and south aisles. At the west end there is a Font with an intricate 19th century cover. Since 2015 the Church has hosted a contemporary art installation behind the font by the Royal Academy's Maciej Urbanek. The Work, titled 'HS', presents an abstract and subversive take on the classic image of the Holy Spirit descending as beams of light. It won the 2015 ACE Award for Art in a Religious Context. The church is Grade II* listed, for its interior.

In 1954 the parish of St Michael's subsumed those of All Saints, Camden Town (which had become a Greek Orthodox church in 1948) and St. Thomas, Agar Town, Wrotham Road (whose 1864 building was demolished due to war damage). From 2003 to 2023 St Michael's formed part of the Old St Pancras Parish, with St Pancras Old Church, St Mary's Church, Somers Town, and St Paul's Church, Camden Square - all four are now independent parishes again.

== Parish work ==
It has an active ministry to the homeless and refugees in the area, and regularly speaks out on local social issues. It featured in the BBC series The Power and the Glory and hosted the launch of the new 'Faithful Cities' report (on which occasion John Sentamu, Archbishop of York and Rowan Williams, Archbishop of Canterbury also dedicated the new parish rooms at the side of the church). In March 2008 its priest, Father Nicholas Wheeler (licensed to the parish on 21 September 1996, and also Team Rector of the St Pancras Team Ministry) left to become Anglican Priest Missioner in Rio de Janeiro. He was replaced as Team Rector and priest of St Michael's by Philip North, previously Shrine Administrator at Walsingham who departed at the end of 2014 to become Bishop of Burnley. He was succeeded by Father Thomas Plant.

The church is linked to St Michael's Church of England Primary School.

== Gallery ==
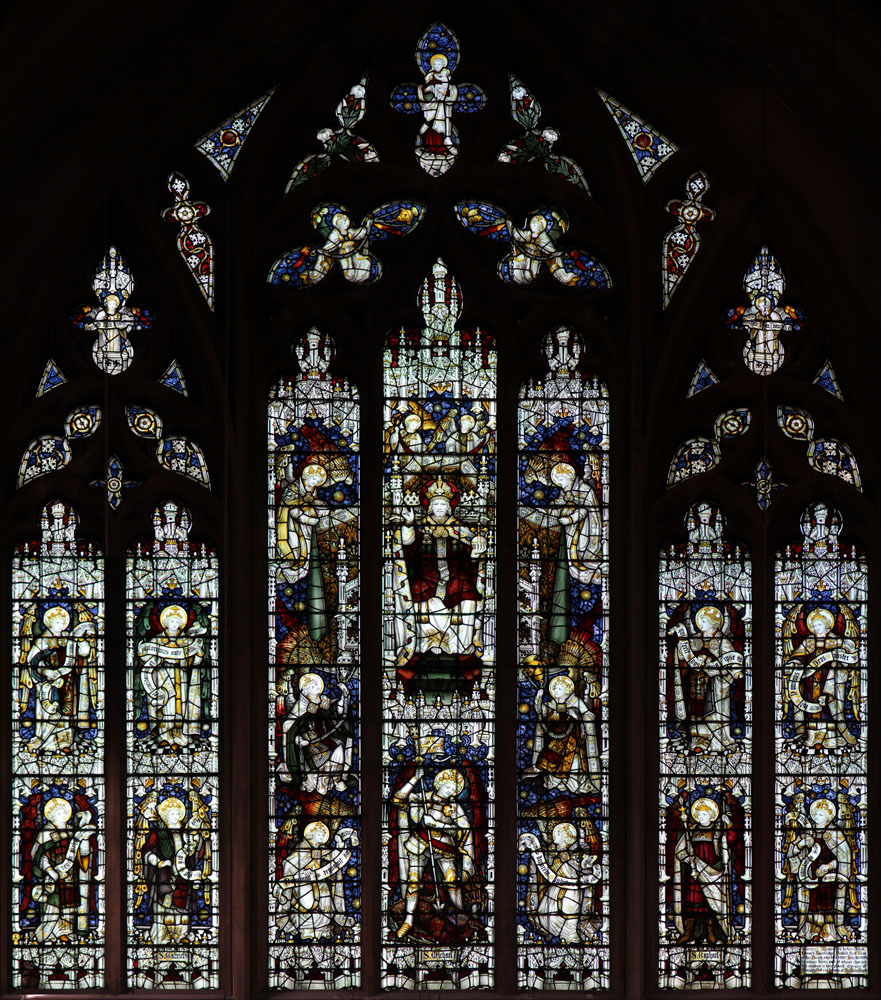

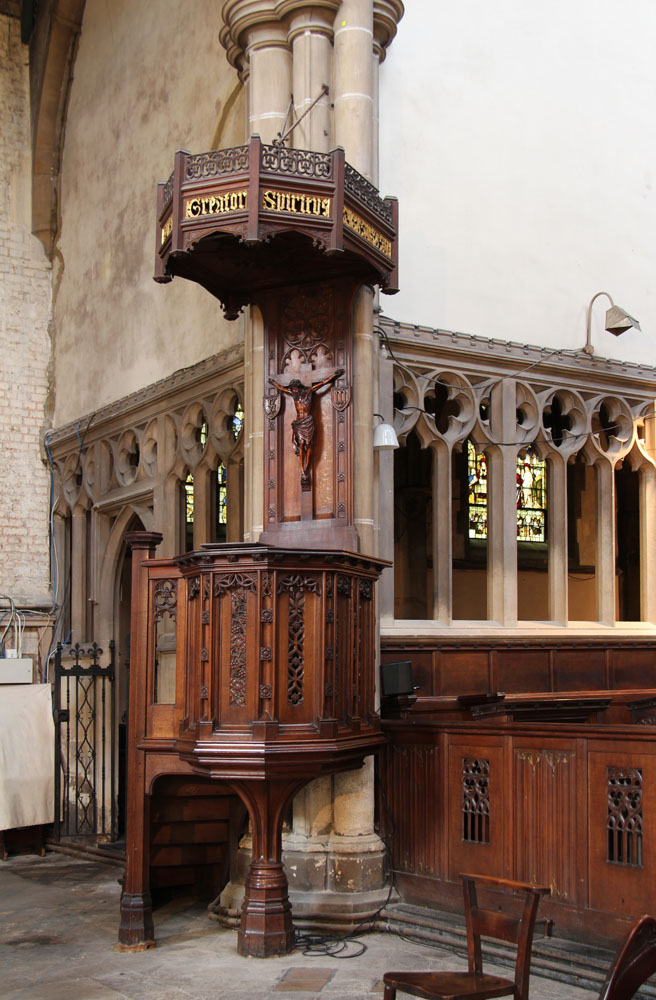

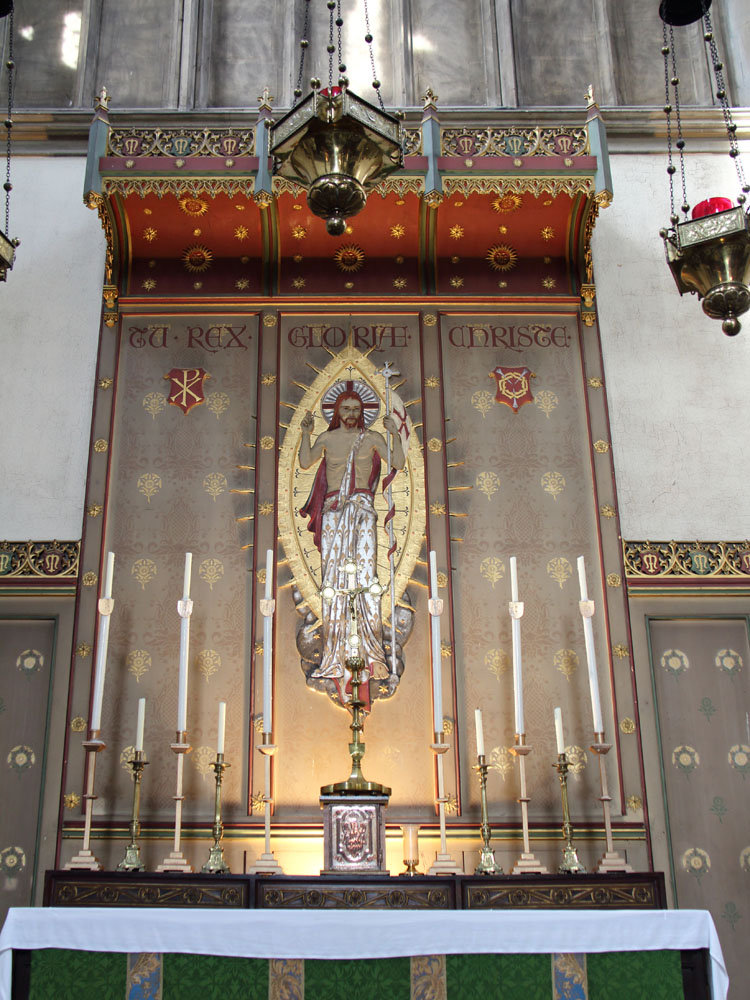

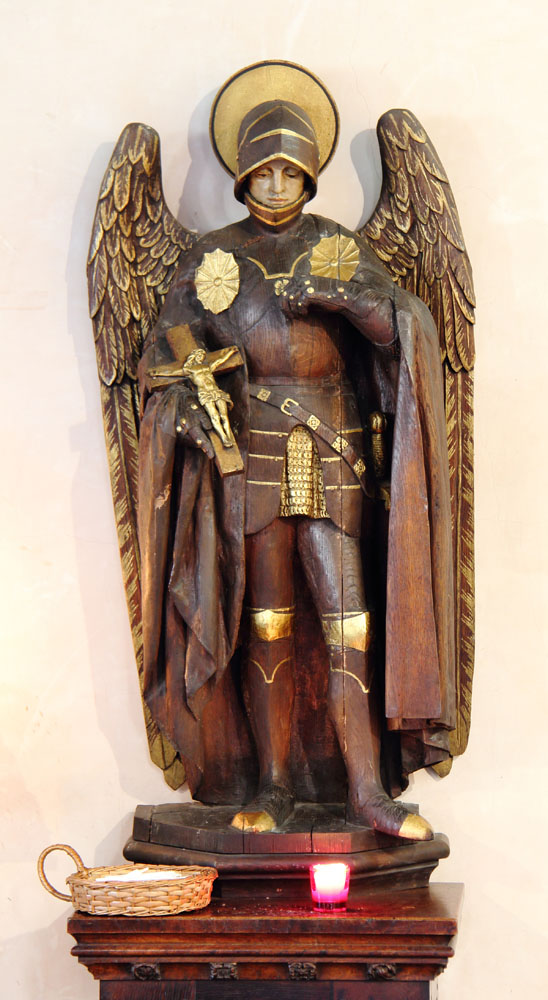

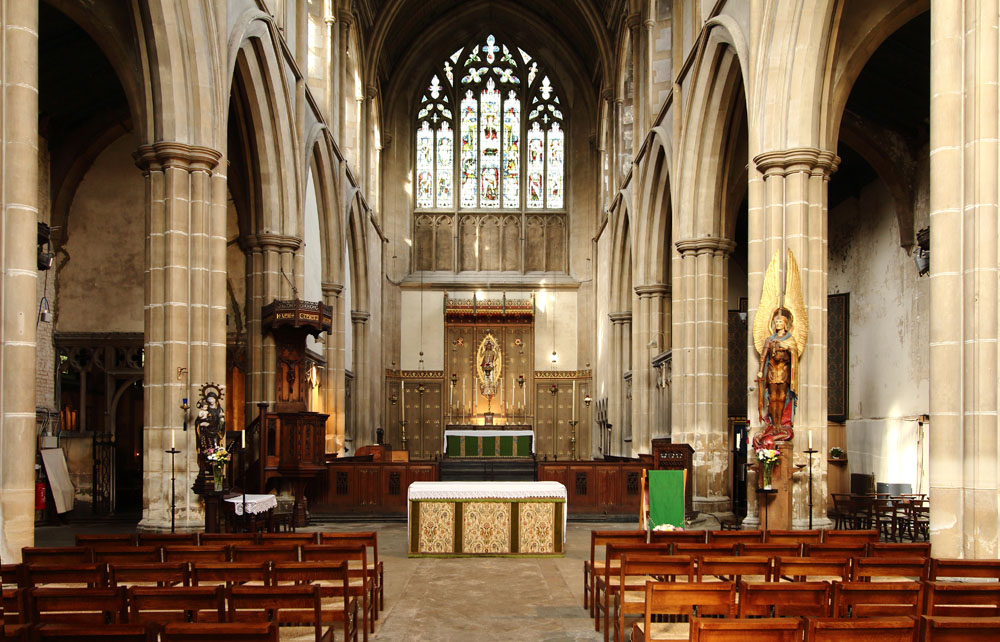

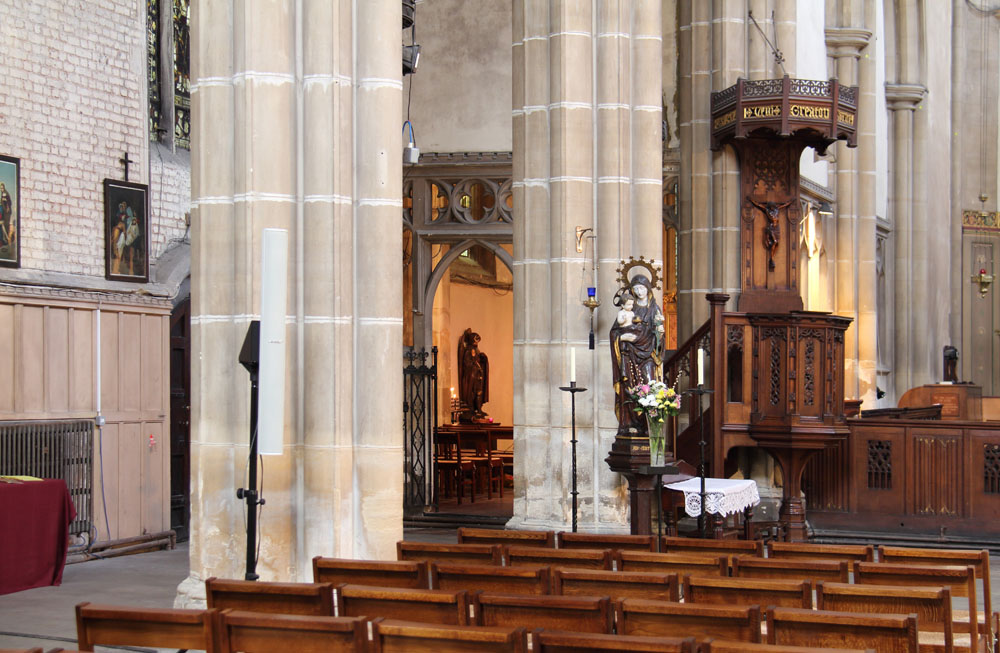

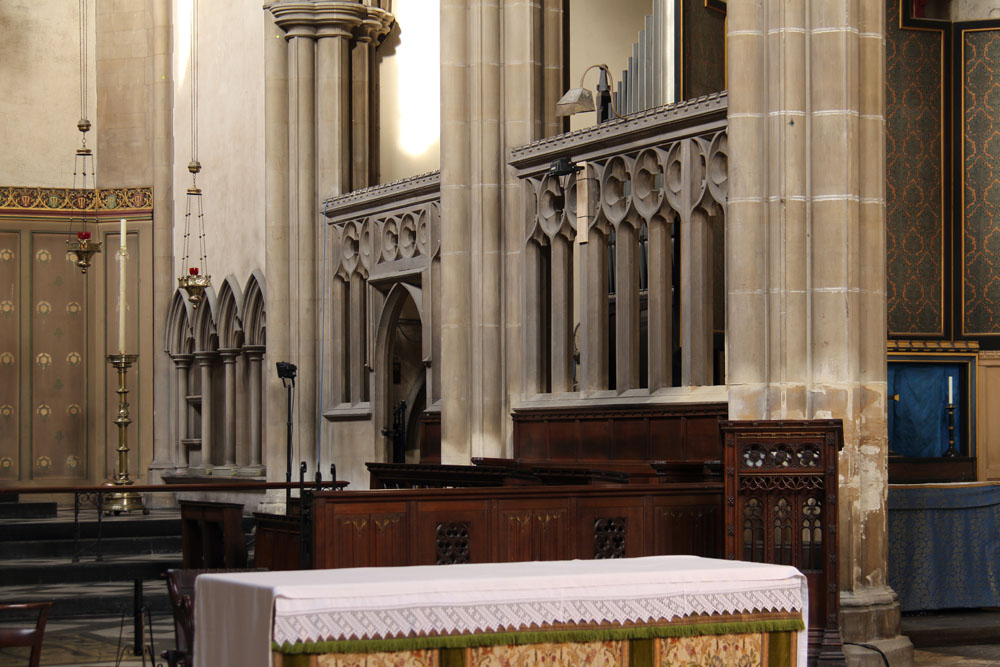
