= Peter Delaney (priest) =

Priest

Peter Anthony Delaney MBE AKC (born 20 June 1939) is a retired Anglican priest of the Church of England.

Delaney trained for the ministry at King's College London and was ordained in 1967. He began his ordained ministry as a curate at St Marylebone Parish Church, after which he was a chaplain at the London University's Church of Christ the King. He officiated at the funeral of film star Judy Garland in June 1969. He was a residential canon and precentor of Southwark Cathedral from 1974 to 1977 and then Vicar of All Hallows-by-the-Tower in the City of London until 2004. He was the Archdeacon of London from 1999 to 2009 and has been the priest in charge of St Stephen Walbrook, also in the City, from 2005. He retired from full-time ministry April 2014 and in retirement has served as an Associate Priest at St Bartholomew the Great.

In 1994-95 he was Master of the Worshipful Company of Gardeners, one of the City of London's 110 livery companies.

Church of England titles
Preceded by George Cassidy	Archdeacon of London; 1999–2009	Succeeded by David Meara
