= Archdeacon of Hampstead =

Church of England ecclesiastical office

The Archdeacon of Hampstead is a senior ecclesiastical officer in the Church of England Diocese of London, named after, and based in and around, the Hampstead area of London. They are the priest responsible for the Archdeaconry of Hampstead.

== History ==
The archdeaconry was created by Order in Council on 23 July 1912 from the ancient archdeaconries of Middlesex and of London; at its erection it consisted the rural deaneries of Enfield, of Holborn, and of Tottenham (from the London archdeaconry) and of Hampstead, of Hornsey, of St Marylebone, of St Pancras, and of Willesden (from the Middlesex archdeaconry). Part of the archdeaconry was split off to create the Charing Cross archdeaconry before 1989. The Hampstead archdeaconry is geographically equivalent to the episcopal area overseen by the area Bishop of Edmonton.

== List of archdeacons ==
- 1912–1920 (ret.): Brook Deedes
- 1920–1950 (ret.): Charles Lambert (afterwards archdeacon emeritus)
- 1950–1962 (ret.): Hubert Matthews (afterwards archdeacon emeritus)
- 1962–1964 (res.): Graham Leonard (afterwards Bishop suffragan of Willesden)
- 1964–1974 (ret.): Hubert Pink (afterwards archdeacon emeritus)
- 1974–1984 (ret.): Fred Pickering (afterwards archdeacon emeritus)
- 1985–1994 (ret.): Robert Coogan (afterwards archdeacon emeritus)
- 1995–1999 (res.): Peter Wheatley (afterwards area Bishop of Edmonton)
- 1999–2010 (res.): Michael Lawson (since archdeacon emeritus)
- 2011–31 July 2015 (res.): Luke Miller (currently Archdeacon of London)
- 2015–present: John Hawkins
