= Richard O'Brien (industrial relations expert) =

Sir Richard O'Brien, DSO, MC* (15 February 1920 – 11 December 2009) was a British engineer, industrial relations expert, civil servant, and decorated British Army officer. He was Chairman of the Manpower Services Commission from 1976 to 1982, Chairman of the Archbishop of Canterbury’s Commission on Urban Priority Areas that published the controversial Faith in the City report in 1985, and Chairman of the Policy Studies Institute from 1984 to 1990.

== Early life ==
O'Brien was born on 15 February 1920 in Chesterfield, Derbyshire, England. He was the only child of Charles O'Brien (1886–1952), a doctor, and his wife, Marjorie Maude (1892–1977). His father was an Irish immigrant who served in the British Army during World War I and was awarded the Military Cross.

He was educated at Oundle School, then an all-boys private school in Oundle, Northamptonshire. In 1938, he matriculated into Clare College, Cambridge to study law. His degree was shortened from three years to two because of the outbreak of World War II in 1939. He graduated with a Bachelor of Arts (BA) degree in 1940.
