= Rob Wickham =

British Anglican bishop (born 1972)

The Right Reverend Rob Wickham
- area Bishop of Edmonton
- Church: Church of England
- Diocese: Diocese of London
- In office: 23 September 2015 – 9 July 2023
- Predecessor: Peter Wheatley
- Other posts: CEO, Church Urban Fund (2023 – present)
- Previous posts: Acting Bishop of Portsmouth (28 April 2021 – 18 January 2022); Area Dean of Hackney (2014–2015)

Orders
- Ordination: 1998 (deacon); 1999 (priest)
- Consecration: 23 September 2015 by Justin Welby

Personal details
- Born: Robert James Wickham; 3 May 1972 (age 54)
- Denomination: Anglicanism
- Education: Hampton School
- Alma mater: Grey College, Durham; King's College London

Robert James "Rob" Wickham (born 3 May 1972) is a British Anglican bishop. He has been CEO of the Church Urban Fund since June 2023, having previously served as Bishop of Edmonton (an area bishop in the Diocese of London) 2015–2023. He also served part-time as Acting Bishop of Portsmouth.

== Early life and education ==
Wickham was born on 3 May 1972. He was educated at Hampton School, an all-boys private school in Hampton, London. After a gap year, he studied geography at Grey College, Durham. He graduated from the University of Durham with a Bachelor of Arts (BA) degree in 1994. He then spent a year working at St Luke's Church, Wallsend, an Anglo-Catholic church in a deprived area of North Tyneside. In 1995, he entered Ridley Hall, Cambridge, a Church of England theological college, where he spent three years studying for ordination to the priesthood.

During his ordained ministry, he undertook post-graduate study. In 2012, he completed a Master of Arts (MA) degree in theology, politics and faith-based organisations at King's College London.

== Ordained ministry ==
Wickham was ordained in the Church of England as a deacon in 1998 and as a priest in 1999. From 1998 to 2001, he continued his training for ministry as a curate at St Mary's Church, Willesden in the Diocese of London; the church contains the Anglican Shrine of Our Lady of Willesden. In 2001, he moved to St Mary's Church, Somers Town where he served as a curate for the next two years. In 2003, he became the Team Vicar in the newly created Parish of Old St Pancras which includes St Pancras Old Church. In 2007, he moved parishes and became Rector of the Church of St John-at-Hackney; this made him the 45th Rector of Hackney. In 2014, he was additionally appointed the Area Dean of Hackney.

=== Episcopal ministry ===
In July 2015, Wickham was announced as the next Bishop of Edmonton, an area bishop in the Diocese of London. On 23 September 2015, he was consecrated a bishop in Canterbury Cathedral by Justin Welby, the Archbishop of Canterbury. It was announced on 26 February 2021 that he was to additionally serve part-time as Acting Bishop of Portsmouth (archbishop's commissary) during the vacancy of that See, starting 28 April 2021. On 18 January 2022, the new Bishop of Portsmouth, Jonathan Frost, took up the See.

On 21 February 2023, it was announced that Wickham was to become CEO of Church Urban Fund. He resigned his See effective 9 July 2023. He has also been an honorary assistant bishop in the Diocese of London since November 2023.

== Personal life ==
Wickham is married to Helen, a primary school teacher. Together, they have three children. He is a supporter of Plymouth Argyle football club.
