= Brian Masters (bishop) =

British Anglican bishop

The Right Reverend Brian Masters
- Bishop of Edmonton
- Church: Church of England
- Diocese: London
- In office: 1984 – 23 September 1998 (died in office)
- Predecessor: Bill Westwood
- Successor: Peter Wheatley
- Other posts: Bishop of Fulham; 1982–1984

Orders
- Ordination: 1964
- Consecration: c. 1982

Personal details
- Born: 17 October 1932 Horsham, Sussex, England
- Died: 23 September 1998 (aged 65) London, England
- Denomination: Anglican
- Education: Queens' College, Cambridge

Brian John Masters (17 October 1932–23 September 1998) was a British Anglican bishop in the Church of England. He was the Bishop of Fulham and then the area Bishop of Edmonton.

Masters was educated at Collyer's School, Horsham, and Queens' College, Cambridge, before beginning his ordained ministry as a curate at St Dunstan and All Saints in Stepney, after which he was the vicar of Holy Trinity with St Mary's Hoxton before his ordination to the episcopate. He died in office while Bishop of Edmonton in September 1998, aged 65.
