= Parish of Old St Pancras =

The Parish of Old St Pancras (previously known as the St Pancras Team Ministry) was an ecclesiastical parish in the Church of England. It was formed on 1 June 2003 and consisted of four churches in north London – St Michael's Church, Camden Town; St Mary's Church, Somers Town; St Pancras Old Church; and St Paul's Church, Camden Square. It was split back into four separate parishes and PCCs on 1 March 2023.

== Clergy ==
The parish employed four priests:

- Father James Elston SSC, Team Vicar, St Pancras Old Church and St Paul's, Camden Square, and Team Rector
- Father Michael Thomas, Team Vicar, St Michael's
- Father Paschal Worton SSC, Team Vicar, St Mary's
- Father Guy Willis SSC, Associate Priest

The first three of these remained the parish priests after the split in 2023, with Elston retaining responsibility for St Paul's Camden Square as well as St Pancras Old Church.
