= Bill Westwood =

Anglican clergyman

William John Westwood (28 December 1925 – 15 September 1999) was the 36th Anglican Bishop of Peterborough.

== Life ==
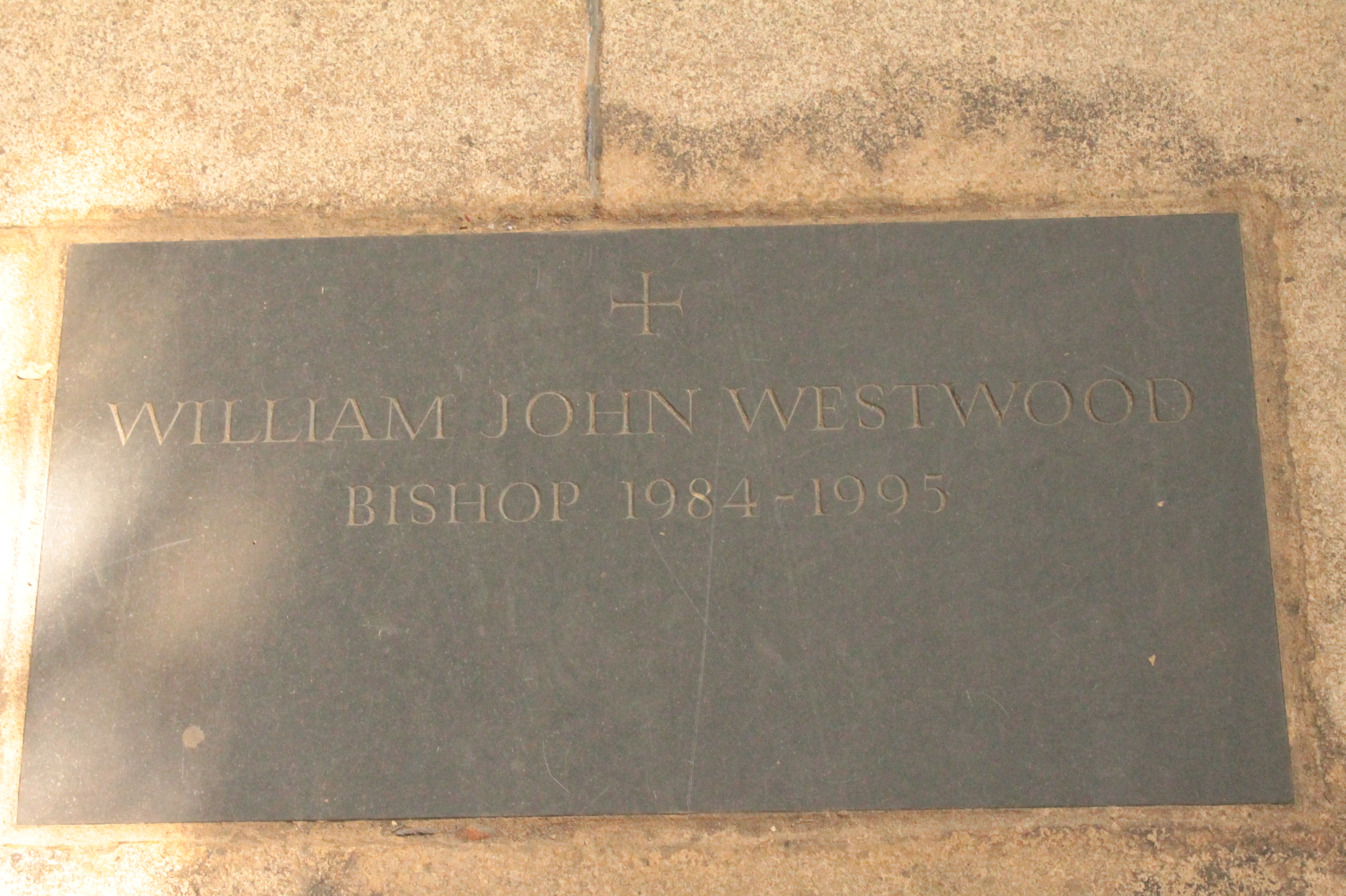
Memorial to William John Westwood, Peterborough Cathedral

Born at Saul, Gloucestershire, Westwood was educated at Grove Park Grammar School, Wrexham and Emmanuel College, Cambridge.

After ordination as a deacon in 1952, Westwood was appointed curate of Holy Trinity Church, Kingston upon Hull. He was ordained priest in 1953. After serving his title in Hull, Westwood was then Rector of St Margaret's Church, Lowestoft (1957-65), Vicar of St Peter Mancroft, Norwich (1965–75) and an honorary canon of Norwich Cathedral. He became the Bishop suffragan of Edmonton in the Diocese of London from his consecration on 24 June 1975 by Donald Coggan, Archbishop of Canterbury, at St Paul's Cathedral. From the creation of the London area scheme in 1979, he was the first area bishop, remained in that see until his translation to Peterborough in late 1984. He was enthroned at Peterborough Cathedral on 12 January 1985, but had become Bishop of Peterborough before that point, with the confirmation of his canonical election to that see near the end of 1984. He described himself as "the only Thatcherite bishop on the bench". He retired as Bishop of Peterborough in December 1995.

He was the chairman of the Church of England's Committee for Communications, President of the Church Housing Association, a member of the Board of Governors of Nene College and an honorary fellow of Emmanuel College, Cambridge from 1989 until his death.

Westwood was a regular contributor to Thought for the Day on BBC Radio 4's Today programme. He was a member of the Press Council (1975–81), the IBA Panel of Religious Advisers (1983–7), the Video Consultative Council (1985–9) and the Broadcasting Standards Council (1988–92).

Following his death a memorial slab was erected in the south aisle of Peterborough Cathedral to his memory.

Oakham Ales produced a beer in honour of Westwood on his retirement, 'Bishop's Farewell', which is still being brewed.

== Family ==
Westwood's son is the hip-hop DJ Tim Westwood.

Church of England titles
Preceded by Alan Rogers	Bishop of Edmonton (London); 1975–1984	Succeeded by Brian Masters
Preceded by Douglas Feaver	Bishop of Peterborough; 1984–1995	Succeeded by Ian Cundy
