= Nick Mercer =

British Anglican priest (born 1949)

The Venerable Nick Mercer
- Archdeacon of London
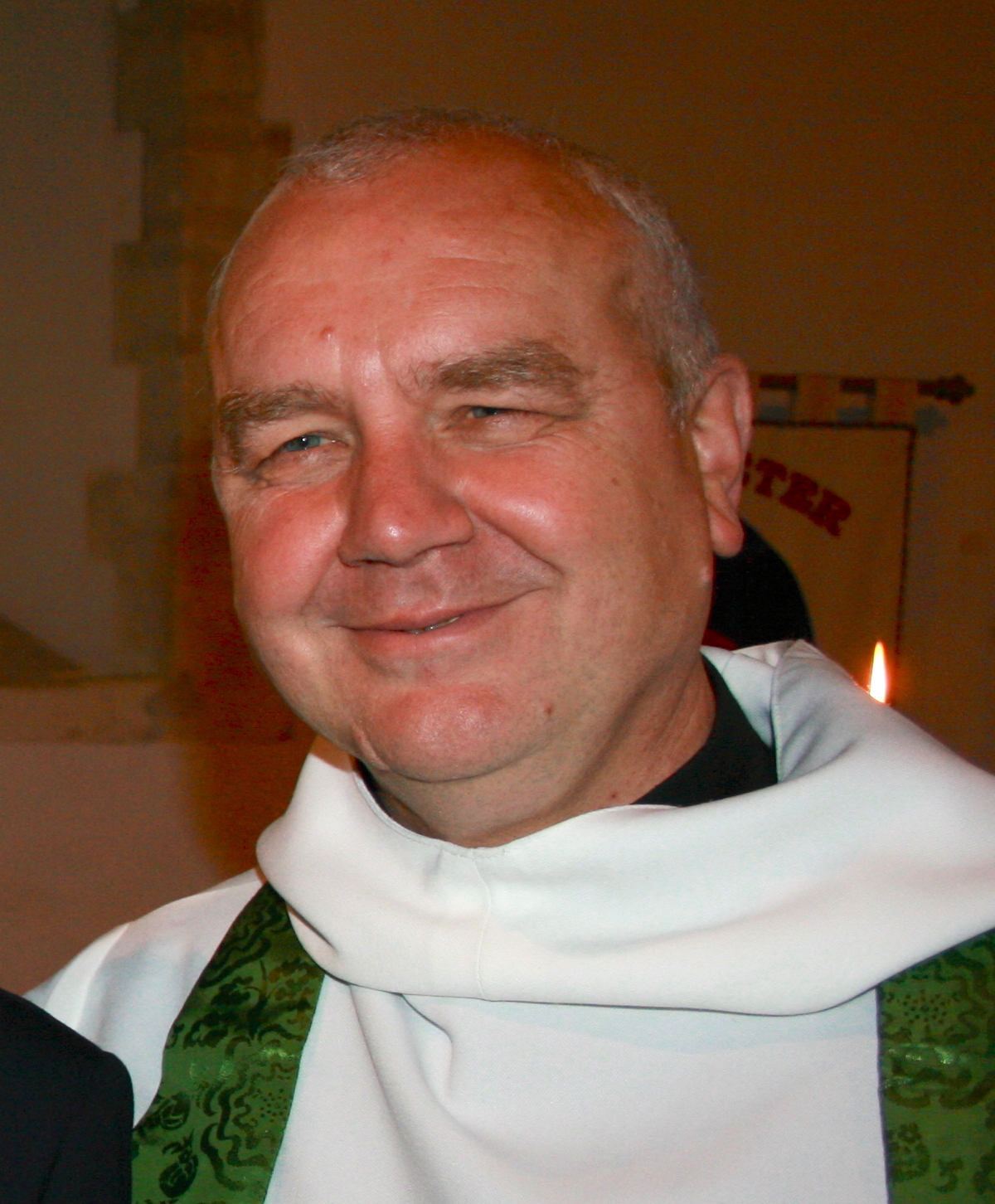
- Mercer in 2008
- Church: Church of England
- Diocese: Diocese of London
- In office: 2014 until 2016
- Predecessor: David Meara
- Successor: Luke Miller
- Other post: Vicar General (2007–2017)

Personal details
- Born: Nicholas Stanley Mercer; 25 December 1949 (age 76)
- Denomination: Anglicanism
- Education: Worthing High School, West Sussex
- Alma mater: Selwyn College, Cambridge; Spurgeon's College; London Bible College; Cranmer Hall, Durham

Nicholas Stanley Mercer (born 25 December 1949) is a British Anglican priest who was the Vicar general for the Diocese of London from 2007 to 2017; he was additionally Archdeacon of London from 2014 until 2016.

== Early life and education ==
Mercer was born on Christmas Day 1949 and raised at Shoreham-by-Sea, one of seven children in a family living in a small three-bedroom home, and was a member of the town's local Baptist church. He was named Nicholas after Saint Nicholas of Myra, Santa Claus. He was educated at primary school in his home town, Worthing High School, and Selwyn College, Cambridge, graduating Bachelor of Arts in 1972 (and Master of Arts in 1976). Remaining at Selwyn College, he studied for, and was awarded, the Postgraduate Certificate in Education as a qualified teacher in 1973.

== Early career ==
Following a short spell of teaching at Lancing College, an independent boarding school located close to his family home, he enrolled at Spurgeon's College, graduating with a second BA degree in 1978. He entered the ministry of the Baptist denomination, beginning as a student minister at a large Baptist church in Enfield, north London, and subsequently as Assistant Minister at Upton Vale Baptist Church, Torquay; later studying at London Bible College (where he was the Laing Scholar), obtaining a Master of Philosophy degree in 1986.

== Church of England ==
Mercer's theological studies eventually led him from the Baptist Union into the Church of England, where he self-identified as an anglo-catholic, later stating that he had been a "closet anglo-catholic" since his university days at Selwyn College. Following training at Cranmer Hall, Durham, he was ordained as a deacon in 1995, and as a priest shortly afterwards, in the same year. In his autobiography, published in the anthology "The post-evangelical debate" (1997), Mercer speaks of a growing realisation that he was no longer a conservative evangelical, despite his continued deep Biblical faith. After curacies in Northwood Hills and Pimlico he was Director of Ministry for the Diocese of London from 2003 to 2007. He was Diocesan Director of Ordinands (overseeing a team of Directors) from 2007 to 2017. He was a Prebendary of St Paul's Cathedral from 2008 (around the time of his appointment as Vicar general) to 2017. He was also honorary priest in charge of St Botolph-without-Bishopsgate in the City of London from 2015 to 2016.

He retired in 2017, on reaching the customary Church of England retirement age of 68 years. He was appointed an emeritus Prebendary of St Paul's cathedral, and an emeritus Archdeacon of London, on his retirement.

Church of England titles
Preceded by David Meara	Archdeacon of London; 2014–2015	Succeeded by Luke Miller
