= Church Urban Fund =

UK charitable organisation

- Founded: 1987
- Type: Community Development
- Registration no.: 297483
- Headquarters: Church Urban Fund The Foundry 17 Oval Way London, SE11 5RR
- Location: England
- Products: Growing Good, Places of Welcome, Near Neighbours, Just Finance Foundation
- Key people: CEO - Rob Wickham
- Website: https://cuf.org.uk/

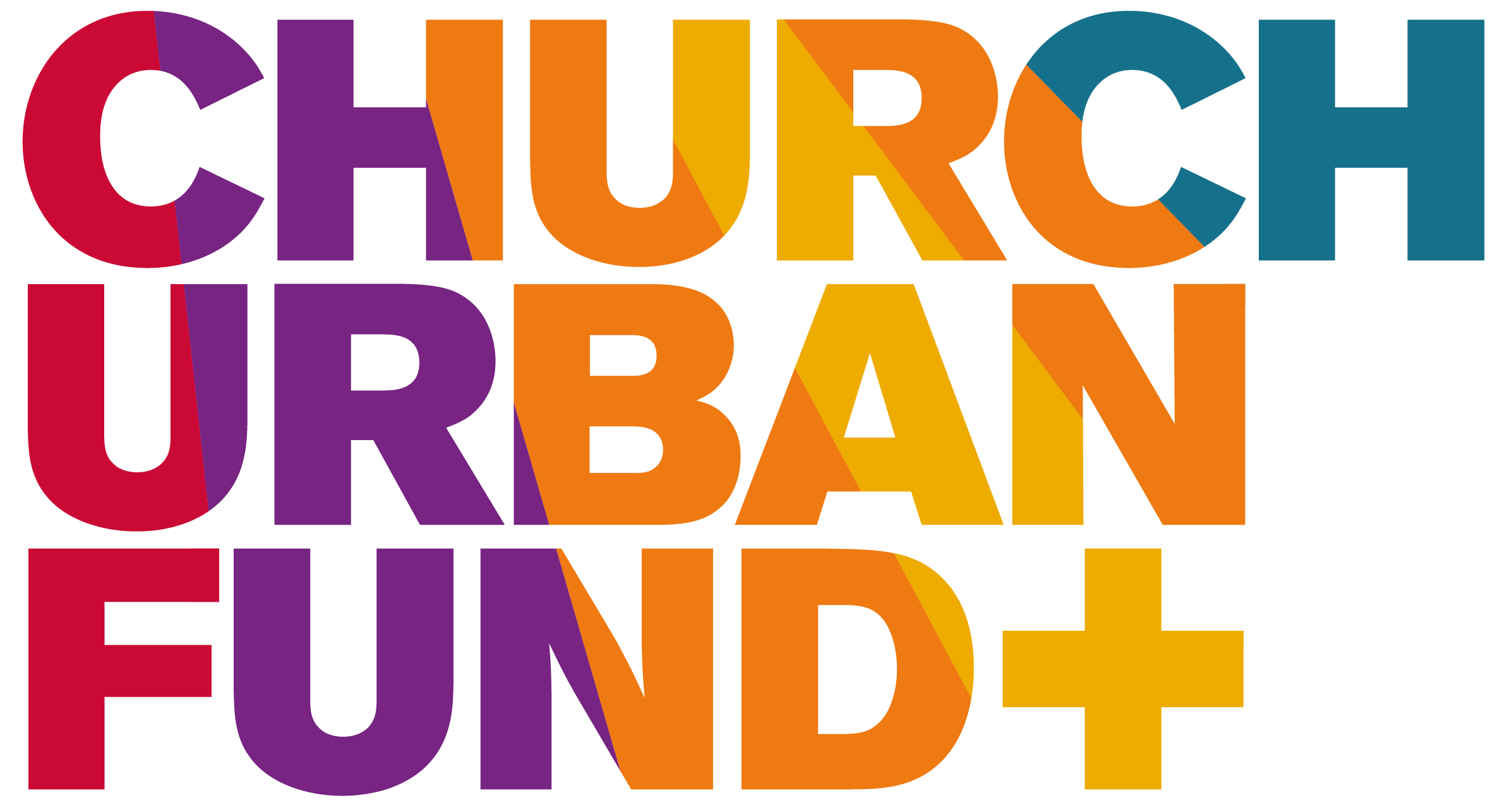

Church Urban Fund is a national charity working with local leaders, churches and other faith groups all over England. Its local partners are committed to serving and strengthening the community where they live.

== Origins ==
CUF was set up by the Church of England in 1987 designed to assist in deprived and impoverished areas of the country. Operating in partnership with faith organisations working at the local level, the charity aims to provide a range of support to help these groups to serve their communities.

Church Urban Fund was one of the legacies of the "Faith in the City" report, produced by the Archbishop of Canterbury’s Commission on Urban Priority Areas in 1985.

== Evolution ==
Church Urban Fund went through a period of significant change between 2012 and 2015. The organisation moved from being primarily a grant giving organisation into being a development agency that is working through the Church of England's diocesan network to offer support to local communities through the Together Network.

== Timeline ==
- 1985 ‘Faith in the City’ report produced, highlighting the social turmoil existing in many of England's cities.
- 1987 The Church Urban Fund launched by the Church of England as a response to ‘Faith in the City’ with the aim of supporting local projects tackling poverty in England's poorest communities. It was envisaged that CUF would have a 20-year life span.
- 1988 A national campaign launched to raise £18 million from Church members.
- 1990 £3.2 million was awarded to projects in England's inner cities and outer housing estates during the year.
- 1991 Over £18 million had been raised by the national campaign since 1987.
- 1996 By the end of 1996, the Fund had awarded over £25 million to over 1,180 projects.
- 1998 The CUF celebrated its 10th anniversary. Two thousand people from CUF supported projects attended a day of music, seminars and prayer in Coventry Cathedral.
- 1998 CUF's Development Programme was established to work with partners outside the Church and to build practical and strategic alliances within church structures at all levels.
- 2000 and 2002 Debates at Synod affirmed the Church's commitment to ministry alongside the poor and marginalised.
- 2003-2004 Extensive consultation at various levels across the dioceses with the Urban Bishop's Panel, Synod members, the public and voluntary sectors, to assess the need for continuing CUF and how the organisation should change to be more effective within its contemporary context.
- 2005 Debate at Synod commended the CUF and backed its continuation. In 2005 CUF had invested more than £55 million in over 4,400 local faith based projects in the poorest areas of England.
- 2006 The Fundraising Campaign due in 2006 to allow CUF to continue to allocate over £3 million each year to projects addressing the needs of disadvantaged communities across England
- 2011 Near Neighbours programme starts work through CUF that brings together people in diverse communities. It is a partnership between CUF and the Archbishops' Council, funded by the Department for Communities and Local Government
- 2012-2015 CUF goes under a period of restructuring that sees the organisation move from being primarily a grants fund to being a development agency that is working in local areas to strengthen communities.
- 2016 CUF adopts a new look with bright orange, red, and yellow colours dominating the way CUF looks. This reflects the new style of work CUF adopted between 2012 and 2015
- 2016 CUF takes on the work of the Just Finance Foundation after the successful trial period set up by the Archbishop of Canterbury
