= Luke Miller =

English priest

The Venerable Luke Miller KHC SSC DL
- Archdeacon of London
- Diocese: Diocese of London
- In office: 1 January 2016–present
- Predecessor: Nick Mercer
- Other posts: Priest-in-charge, St Andrew-by-the-Wardrobe (31 July 2015–present); Archdeacon of Hampstead (2010–2015)

Orders
- Ordination: 1991 (deacon); 1992 (priest)

Personal details
- Born: Luke Jonathan Miller; 27 June 1966 (age 60)
- Spouse: Jacqueline Ann Blunden (m. 1995)
- Children: 3
- Education: Haileybury and Imperial Service College
- Alma mater: Sidney Sussex College, Cambridge; St Stephen's House, Oxford

Luke Jonathan Miller KHC SSC DL (born 27 June 1966) is a Church of England priest. Since January 2016, he has been Archdeacon of London. From 2010 until 2015, he was Archdeacon of Hampstead in the Diocese of London. He is an executive officer of the Society of Mary, an Anglican devotional society.

== Early life ==
Miller was born on 27 June 1966 to Paul and Hilary Miller. He was educated at Haileybury and Imperial Service College, a private school in Hertfordshire. He studied history at Sidney Sussex College, Cambridge, and graduated from the University of Cambridge with a Bachelor of Arts (BA) degree in 1987; as per tradition, this was promoted to a Master of Arts (MA (Cantab)) degree in 1991.

Following graduation, he spent one year as a pastoral assistant at St James's Church, Sussex Gardens, an Anglo-Catholic church in Paddington, London. He then entered St Stephen's House, Oxford, an Anglo-Catholic theological college, to train for the priesthood and to study theology. He graduated from the University of Oxford, of which St Stephen's House is a permanent private hall, with a BA degree in 1990; as per tradition, this was promoted to an MA (Oxon) degree in 1993.

== Ordained ministry ==
Miller was ordained in the Church of England as a deacon in 1991 and as a priest in 1992. From 1991 to 1994, he served his curacy at St Matthew's Church, Oxhey Village in the Diocese of St Albans. In 1994, he was appointed a curate of St Mary the Virgin, Tottenham, in the Diocese of London. In 1995, he was appointed vicar of the church. During his ten years as vicar, he was involved in church planting in the area. From 2005 to 2010, he was also Area Dean of East Haringey.

In November 2010, he was appointed Archdeacon of Hampstead. This meant leaving parish ministry and taking on a leadership role in the Diocese of London. From 2011 to 2012, he additionally served as priest-in-charge of Holy Trinity Church, Winchmore Hill, London. On 31 July 2015, he ceased to be Archdeacon of Hampstead upon his appointment as Priest-in-Charge of St Andrew-by-the-Wardrobe. He became Archdeacon of London on 1 January 2016. He was also a Chaplain to the Queen (QHC) from 2020 to 2022, and has continued in that role as Chaplain to the King (KHC) since Charles III's succession in 2022.

In addition to his parish and diocesan roles, Miller has served as a chaplain to the Sea Cadet Corps and is its London Area Chaplain. In 2022, he was awarded the Cadet Forces Medal; this is awarded in recognition of 12 years of long and efficient service in the UK Cadet Forces.

== Other roles ==
Miller is of the Catholic tradition of the Church of England and is a member of the Society of the Holy Cross (SSC). He is an executive officer of the Society of Mary, an Anglican devotional society, having served at various times as vice-chairman and returning officer.

From 1996 to 2011, he served as a governor of Mulberry Primary School, London Borough of Haringey, and was its chair of governors between 2001 and 2011. He has been a member of the council of Haileybury and Imperial Service College, his old school, since 2006, and of St Stephen's House, Oxford, his alma mater, since 2008.

== Personal life ==
In 1995, Miller married Jacqueline Ann (née Blunden). She is a teacher and a priest in the Church of England. Together, they have three sons; Thomas, Fr Stephen Miller SSC, and Sub-Lieutenant Andrew Miller Royal Navy.

== Selected works ==
- Miller, Luke (2006). "The winds of change: 1914-45". In Davage, William (ed.). In this sign conquer: a history of the Society of the Holy Cross 1855 – 2005. London: Continuum. pp. 120–144. ISBN 978-0826491862.
- Miller, Luke (2014). The Sorrow of Nature: The Way of the Cross with George Congreve and St Therese of Lisieux. London: The Catholic League. ISBN 978-0992849702.
