= Peter Wheatley =

British bishop

The Right Reverend Peter Wheatley
- Bishop of Edmonton
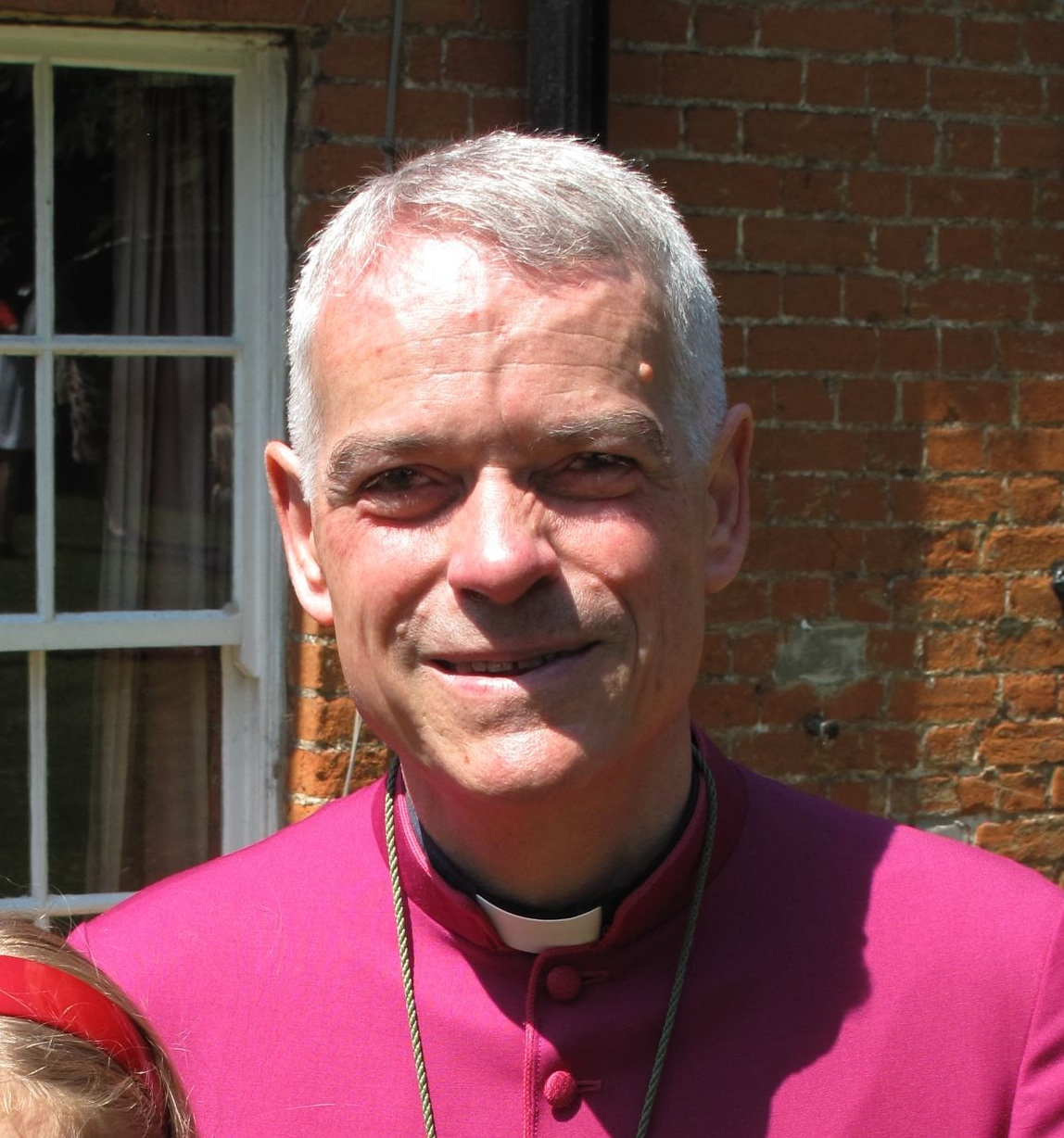
- Wheatley in 2009
- Church: Church of England
- Province: Canterbury
- Diocese: London
- See: Edmonton
- In office: 1999 to 2014
- Predecessor: Brian Masters
- Successor: Rob Wickham
- Other post: Archdeacon of Hampstead (1995–1999)

Orders
- Ordination: 1973 (deacon); 1974 (priest)
- Consecration: March 1999 by George Carey

Personal details
- Born: 7 September 1947 (age 79)
- Education: The Queen's College, Oxford

Peter Wheatley (born 7 September 1947) is a retired bishop in the Church of England. From 1995 to 1999, he was the Archdeacon of Hampstead. From 1999 to 2014, he was the Bishop of Edmonton, an area bishop in the Diocese of London.

== Early life ==
Educated at Ipswich School, The Queen's College, Oxford, and Pembroke College, Cambridge, Wheatley trained for ordination at the College of the Resurrection and Ripon Hall, Oxford and was ordained in 1973.

== Ordained ministry ==
Wheatley served his curacy at All Saints Church, Fulham, becoming vicar of Holy Cross in St Pancras, London in 1978. In 1982, he moved to become priest-in-charge of All Souls' Hampstead and St Mary's Kilburn. He also became vicar of St James' in West Hampstead at this time.

While remaining a parish priest, Wheatley became the Director of Post-Ordination Training in 1988 for the Edmonton area. Between 1988 and 1993, he was also Area Dean of North Camden and was a member of the General Synod from 1975 to 1995. He became Archdeacon of Hampstead in 1995.

Wheatley was consecrated as Bishop of Edmonton in March 1999.

He announced his intention to retire at the end of 2014 to the London Diocesan Synod on 17 July 2014. He retired from full-time ministry on 31 December 2014.

Wheatley retired to the south coast of England in 2014, but since that time has been licensed as an honorary assistant bishop in both the Diocese of Southwark and the Diocese of London. Additionally, since 2014, he has served as episcopal patron of the chapter and companions of the Shrine of Our Lady of Willesden. From 2019 to 2022, during an interregnum, he was priest-in-charge of Christ Church, St Leonards-on-Sea in the Diocese of Chichester. Since the appointment of a new rector, he has continued to serve in the parish as an honorary assistant clergy.

== Doctrinal positions ==
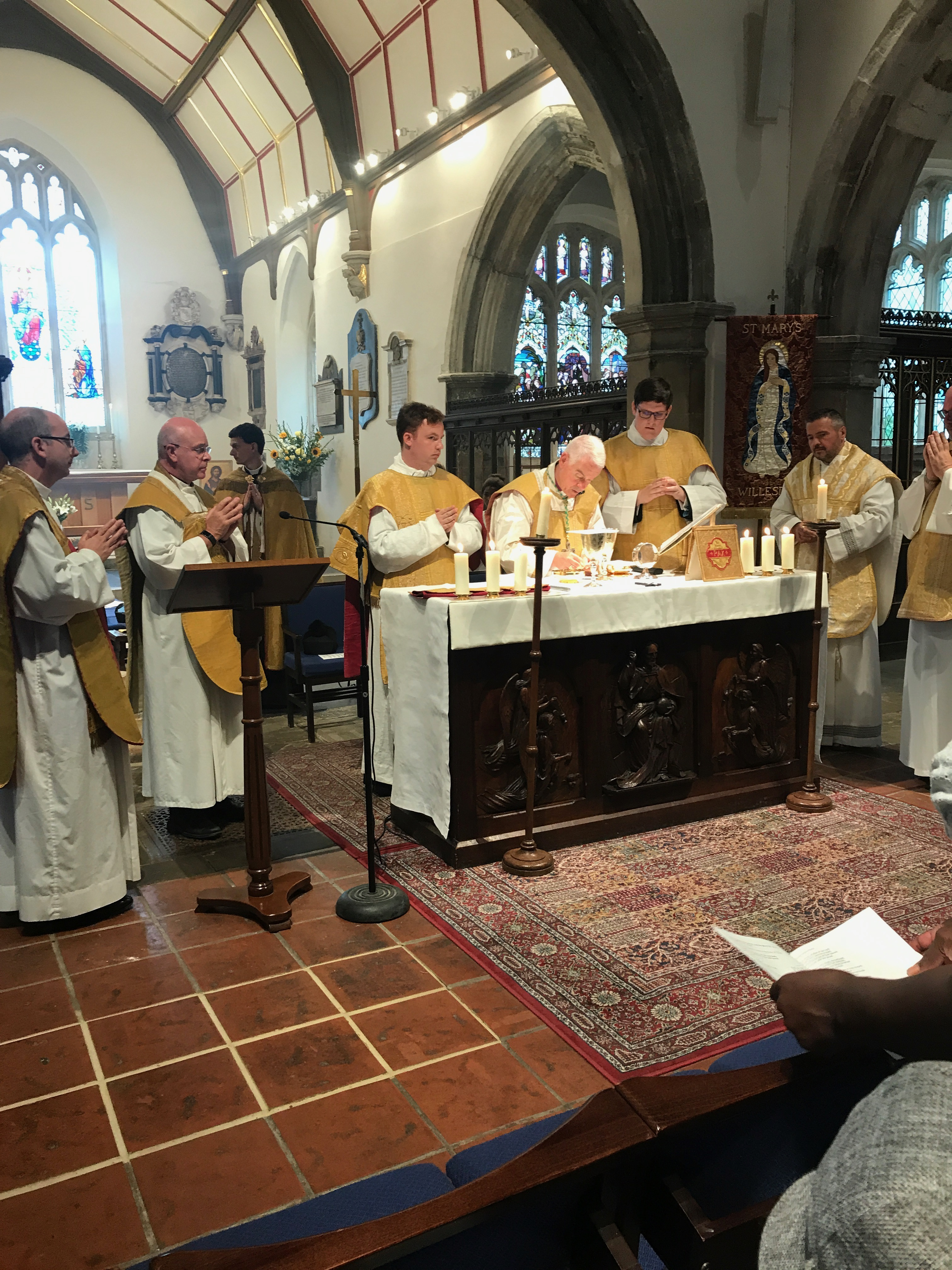
Bishop Wheatley presiding at mass with chapter priests of the Shrine of Our Lady of Willesden.

Wheatley is opposed to the ordination of women as priests and bishops. In 2008 he was one of several hundred clergy who signed an open letter from Forward in Faith calling upon the Archbishops of Canterbury and York, as co-chairmen of the Church of England's General Synod, to ensure that legal protections established in 1992 for those clergy who were conscientiously unable to accept the ordination of women be preserved. This was in response to a proposal in General Synod that the statutory legal protections concerned should be replaced with a merely advisory "Code of Practice".

== Personal life ==
In 2003, The Times reported that Wheatley was gay. By 2003, he had been sharing his home with his partner for eight years. He has stated that he is "a celibate Christian living by Christian teachings".

== Styles ==
- Peter Wheatley (1947–1973)
- The Revd Peter Wheatley (1973–1995)
- The Ven Peter Wheatley (1995–1999)
- The Rt Revd Peter Wheatley (1999—present)

Church of England titles
Preceded by Brian Masters	Bishop of Edmonton; 1999–2014	Succeeded by Rob Wickham
