= 1824 in architecture =

The year 1824 in architecture involved some significant events.

== Buildings and structures ==
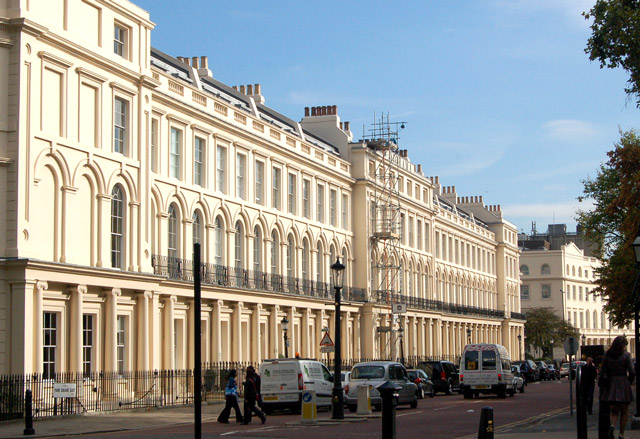
Park Square, London, east side

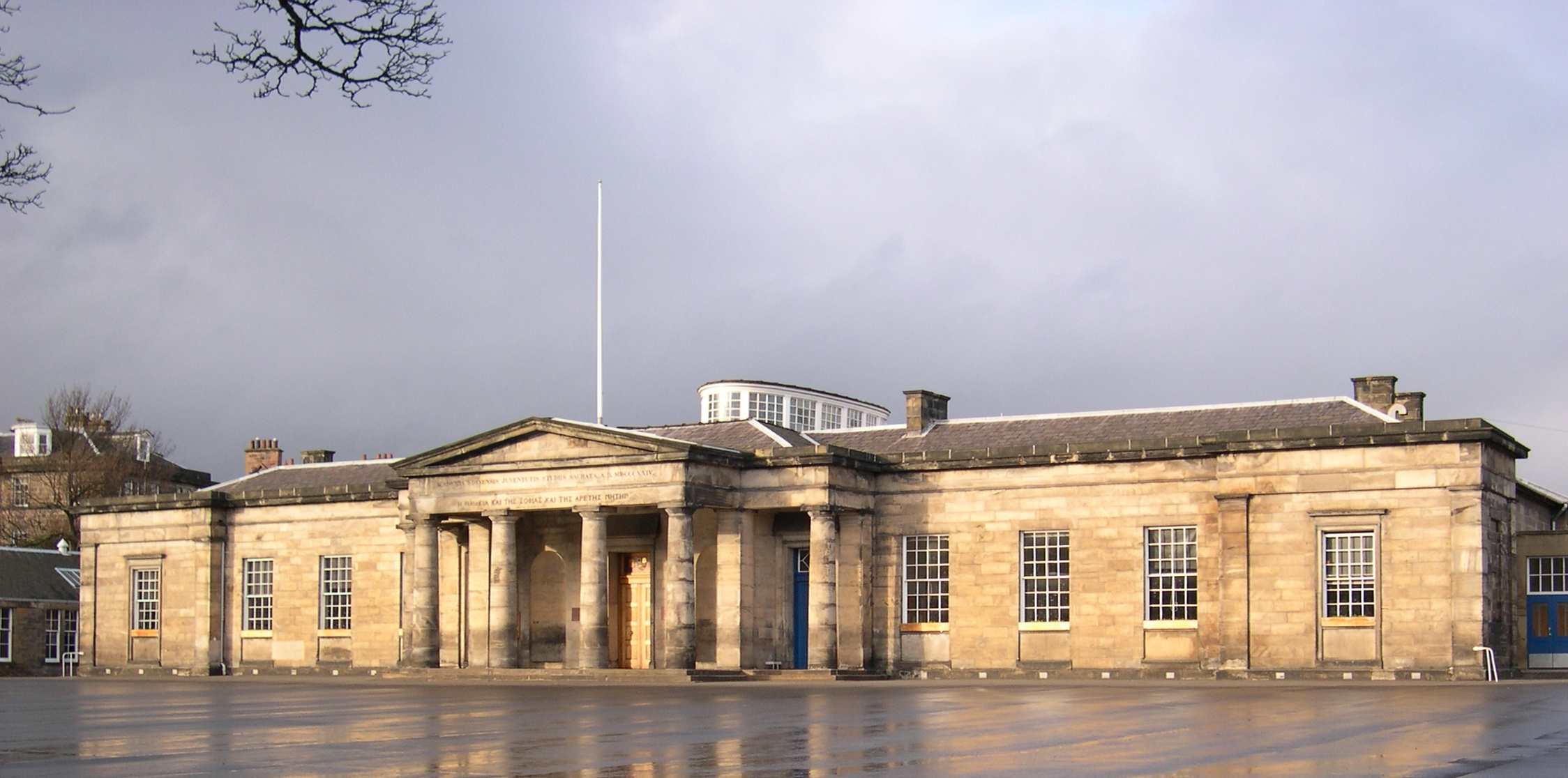
The Edinburgh Academy in Scotland

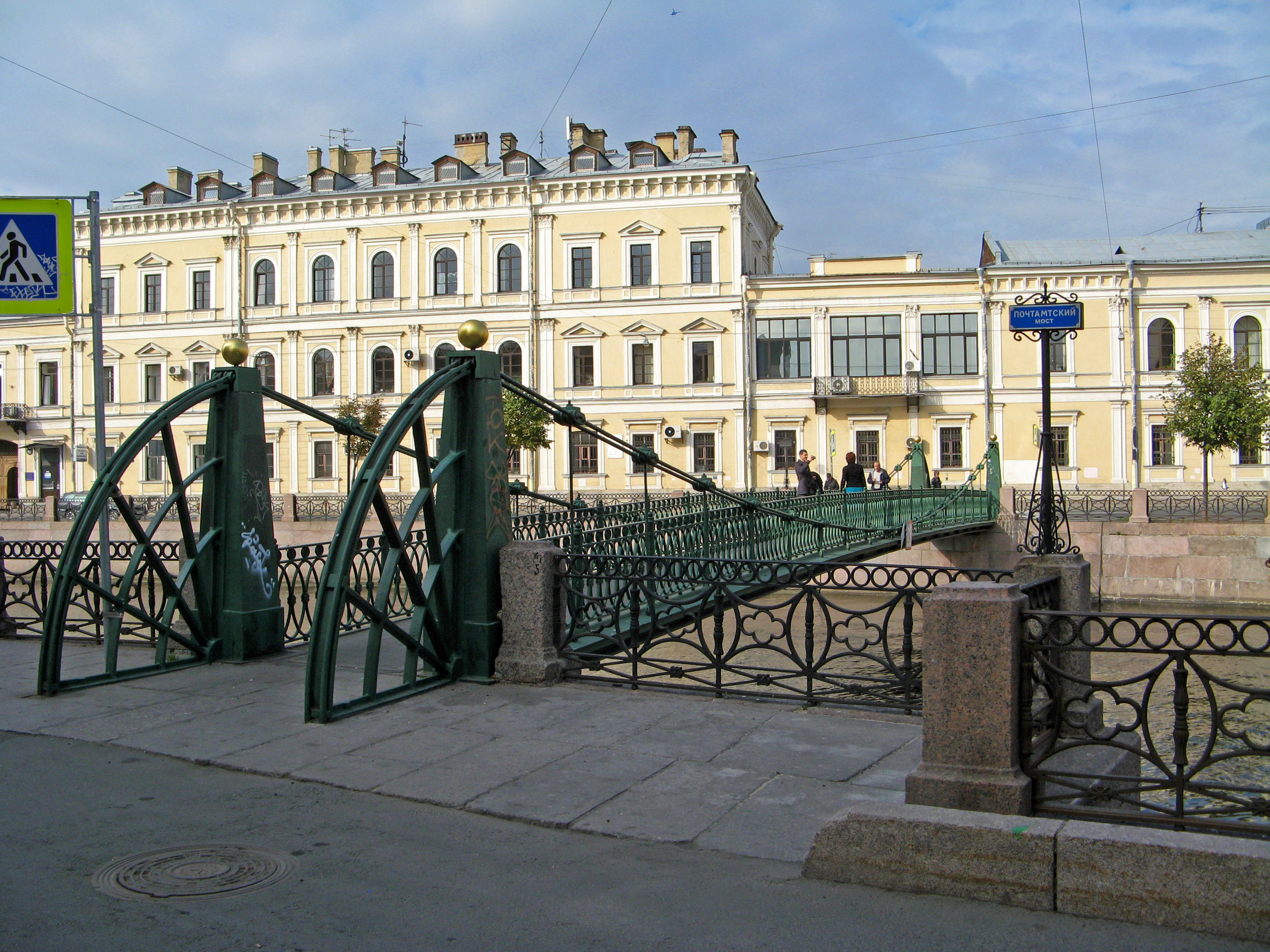
Pochtamtsky Bridge in Saint Petersburg, Russia

- The Second Bank of the United States in Philadelphia, designed by William Strickland, is completed.
- Camden Chapel, Camden Town, London, designed by William and Henry Inwood, is completed.
- Commissioners' churches in London completed:
  - St Anne's Church, Wandsworth, designed by Robert Smirke.
  - St Luke's Church, Chelsea, designed by James Savage.
  - St Mark's Church, Kennington.
  - St Mary's, Bryanston Square, designed by Robert Smirke.
- St Matthew's Church, Brixton, London, designed by Charles F. Porden, is completed.
- St Andrew's Church, Liverpool, England, designed by Daniel Stewart and John Foster, is opened.
- St James' Church, Sydney, Australia, designed by Francis Greenway, is consecrated.
- The Edinburgh Academy in Scotland, designed by William Burn, is opened.
- The Pilgrim Hall Museum in Plymouth, Massachusetts, designed by Alexander Parris, is opened.
- The Chatham Garden Theatre in New York City, designed by George Conklin, is opened.
- The Kurhaus of Baden-Baden in Germany is designed by Friedrich Weinbrenner.
- Park Square, London, designed by John Nash, is completed.
- Abbotsford House in Scotland is completed for Sir Walter Scott.
- Final remodelling of the houses that will become Sir John Soane's Museum in London by Soane is completed.
- Windsor Bridge across the River Thames in England, designed by Charles Hollis, is opened.
- Aldford Iron Bridge across the River Dee in Cheshire, England, designed by Thomas Telford, is completed.
- Pochtamtsky Bridge in Saint Petersburg (pedestrian suspension), designed by Wilhelm von Traitteur and Christianovich, is completed.

== Awards ==
- August 12 – King George IV of the United Kingdom lays the foundation stone for remodelling of Windsor Castle in England, knights his architect Jeffry Wyatt and permits him to change his name to Jeffry Wyatville.
- Grand Prix de Rome, architecture: Henri Labrouste.

== Births ==
- April 4 – Edmund Wright, English-born Australian architect (died 1888)
- June 20 – George Edmund Street, English architect (died 1881)
- Approximate date – Charles Henry Howell, English architect specialising in lunatic asylums (died 1905)

== Deaths ==
- October 26 – Joseph Bénard, French architect (born 1764)
