= 1822 in architecture =

The year 1822 in architecture involved some significant events.

== Buildings and structures ==
=== Buildings completed ===
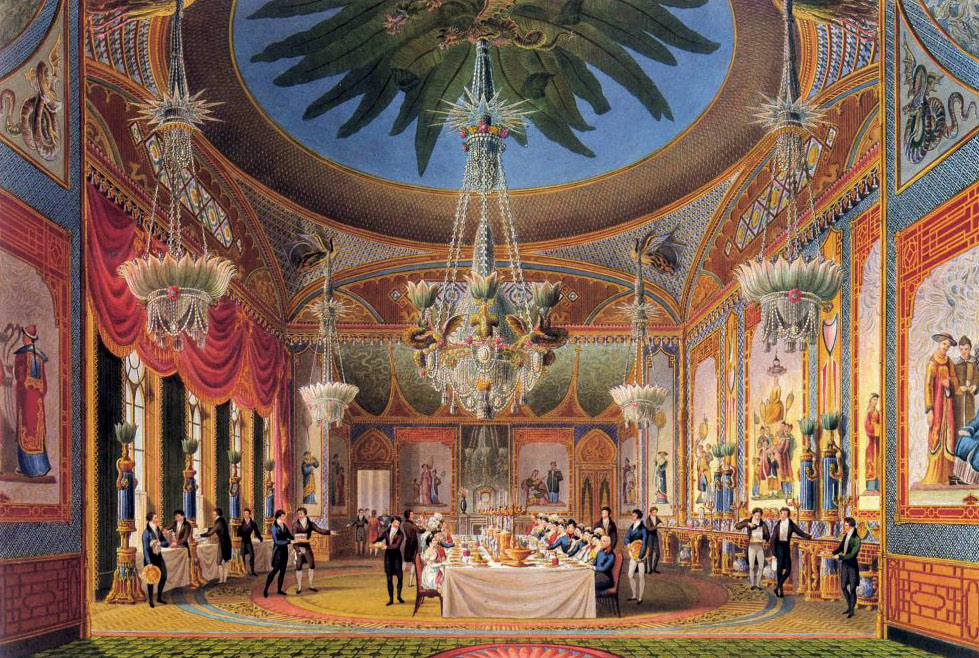
Banqueting Room, Royal Pavilion, Brighton, by the architect, John Nash

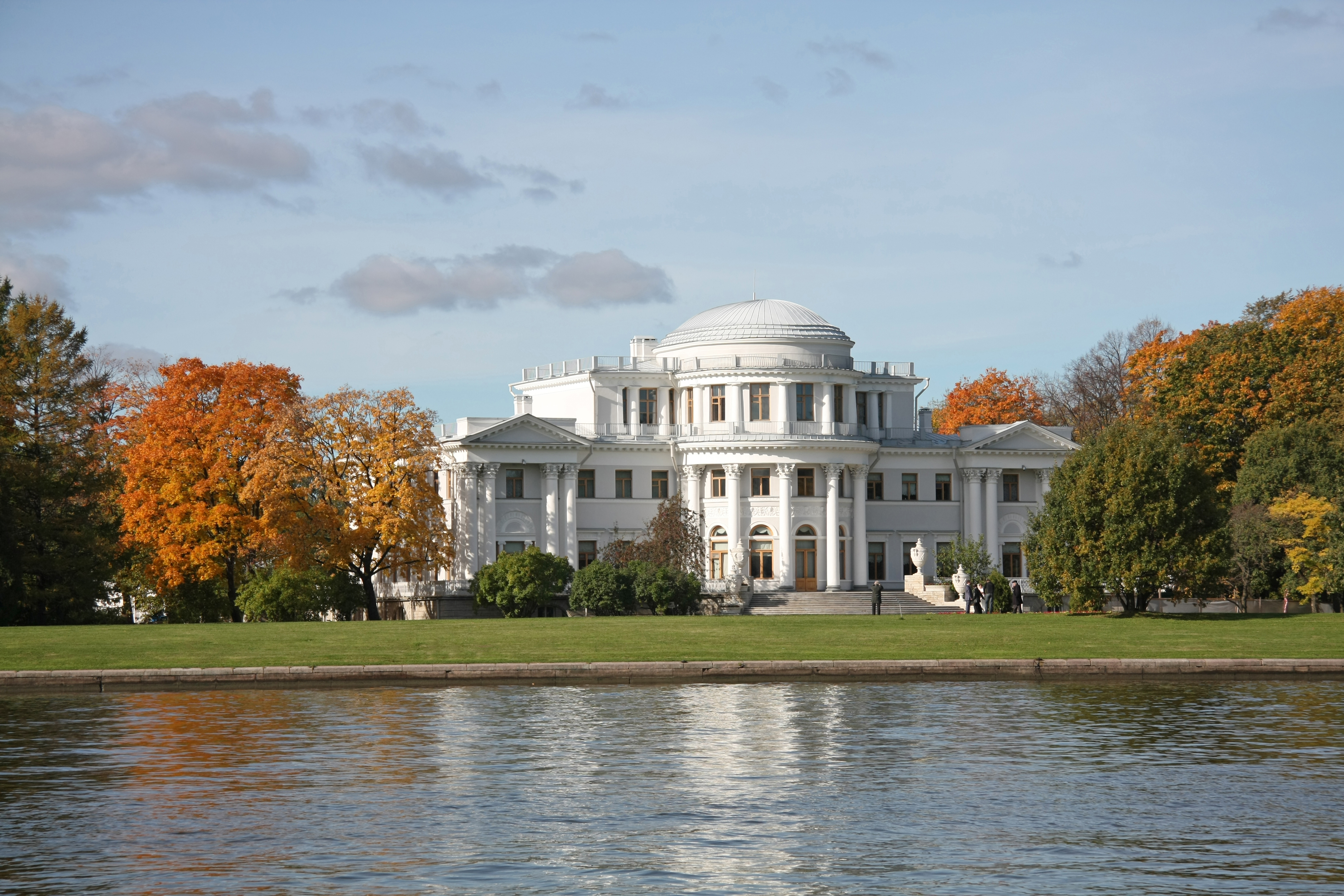
The Yelagin Palace in Saint Petersburg, Russia

- Piazza del Popolo, Rome, by Giuseppe Valadier, completed.
- Saint David's Building, the original home of St David's College, Lampeter, Wales, by Charles Cockerell.
- Reconstruction and new prison buildings at Chester Castle, England, by Thomas Harrison.
- St Pancras New Church, London, by William and Henry William Inwood.
- Kalupur Swaminarayan Mandir, Ahmedabad, British Raj.
- Assembly Rooms, Aberdeen, Scotland, by Archibald Simpson.
- Second Chestnut Street Theatre, Philadelphia, United States, by William Strickland.
- Main building of Government Palace (Finland) in Helsinki Senate Square, by Carl Ludvig Engel.
- Façade of Register House, Princes Street, Edinburgh, Scotland, by Robert Reid.
- Reconstruction of Royal Pavilion, Brighton, England by John Nash.
- Yelagin Palace, Saint Petersburg, by Carlo Rossi.
- Cartland Bridge, Scotland, by Thomas Telford.
- Pont de pierre (Bordeaux), by Jean-Baptiste Billaudel and Claude Deschamps.
- Aban Palace, Kumasi, a project of Asantehene Osei Bonsu.

== Awards ==
- Grand Prix de Rome, architecture: Émile Gilbert.

== Births ==
- January 9 – Carol Benesch, Silesian and Romanian architect (died 1896)
- April 26 – Frederick Law Olmsted, American landscape architect (died 1903)
- September 12 – Philip Charles Hardwick, English architect (died 1892)
- December 6 – David Stirling, Scottish-born Dominion architect for federal works in Nova Scotia (died 1887)
- December – Frank Wills, English-born architect working in North America (died 1857)

== Deaths ==
- John Bowden, Irish ecclesiastical architect
- Luigi Rusca, Swiss architect working in Russia (born 1762)
