= Poverty Discovered =

- Location within Maryland
- 39°18′52″N 77°00′26″W
- Nearest city: Cooksville, Maryland

History
- Built: 18th century

Site notes
- Architectural style: Log

Poverty Discovered is a historic property located in Cooksville in Howard County, Maryland, United States.

"Poverty Discovered" is named after the 1737-acre land tract Given to Joseph Hobbs by Lord Calvert in 1760. It was then owned by Captain Thomas Hobbs, who was involved in the burning of the Peggy Stewart. He willed the property to his son, Kentucky General Assemblyman Joseph Hobbs Jr. The slave farm was situated on the road to Ellicott's Mills from Hood's Mill. By 1783, "Poverty Discovered" was subdivided and consisted of 400 acres. On November 3, 1793, Henry Howard sold the Poverty Discovered estate of James Beached at public auction.

The Poverty Discovered plantation house was built c. 1760. It is log construction with brick and stone construction additions with left-centered doors. Outbuildings include a log framed structure. In the 1930s a porch was enclosed for a kitchen. William J Bryson owned the house in the 1970s and substantial renovations occurred in 1989. The building is registered by the county as HO-117, with an abbreviated history.

In 1966, the Rouse Company added "Poverty Discovered" to the list of local historical names to call their new land development project.

The Property is now run as the "Summer Hill Farm" which raises thoroughbred horses for track uses or sale. Neighboring Greenway farms also resides on land once named "Poverty Discovered". In 2012, the resale of the adjacent Woodmont Academy sparked controversy as a high density use of the property next to the historic site.

== See also ==
- List of Howard County properties in the Maryland Historical Trust
- Woodmont Academy
- Hood's Mill
