= Inwood =

Inwood may refer to:

== Places ==
=== In Canada ===
- Inwood, Manitoba
- Inwood, Ontario

=== In the United Kingdom ===
- A hamlet in All Stretton parish, Shropshire
- Inwood, Warleigh, Wiltshire, England

=== In the United States ===
- Inwood, Florida
- Inwood, Indiana
- Inwood, Iowa
- Inwood, Manhattan, a neighborhood in Manhattan, New York City
  - Inwood Hill Park
  - Inwood – 207th Street (IND Eighth Avenue Line), a New York City Subway station serving the A train
- Inwood, Mississippi, a ghost town
- Inwood, New York, in Nassau County
  - Inwood (LIRR station), a Long Island Rail Road station
  - Inwood Country Club
- Inwood, Maryland
- Inwood, Michigan, ghost town
- Inwood, San Antonio, a district of the city of San Antonio, Texas
- Inwood, West Virginia
- Inwood Forest, Houston, Texas
- Inwood Township, Michigan

== Other uses ==
- Inwood (surname)
