= Inwood, Maryland =

Unincorporated community in Maryland, U.S.

Coordinates: 39°18′22″N 77°01′15″W

Inwood is an unincorporated community in Howard County, Maryland, United States. The crossroads settlement was settled around Woodlawn, home of Dr. Edwin Warfield, which has been removed for the Gary J. Arthur Community Center and Cooksville Library. The town once featured a general store, blacksmith shop and residential homes. The neighborhood postal service is now consolidated around Cooksville. Inwood is a very small historic town located between Cooksville and Glenwood.

== See also ==
- Bushy Park
- Shipley's Adventure (Cooksville, Maryland)
- Sarah Jane Powell Log Cabin
