= Roberts Inn =

Historic house in Maryland, United States

- U.S. National Register of Historic Places
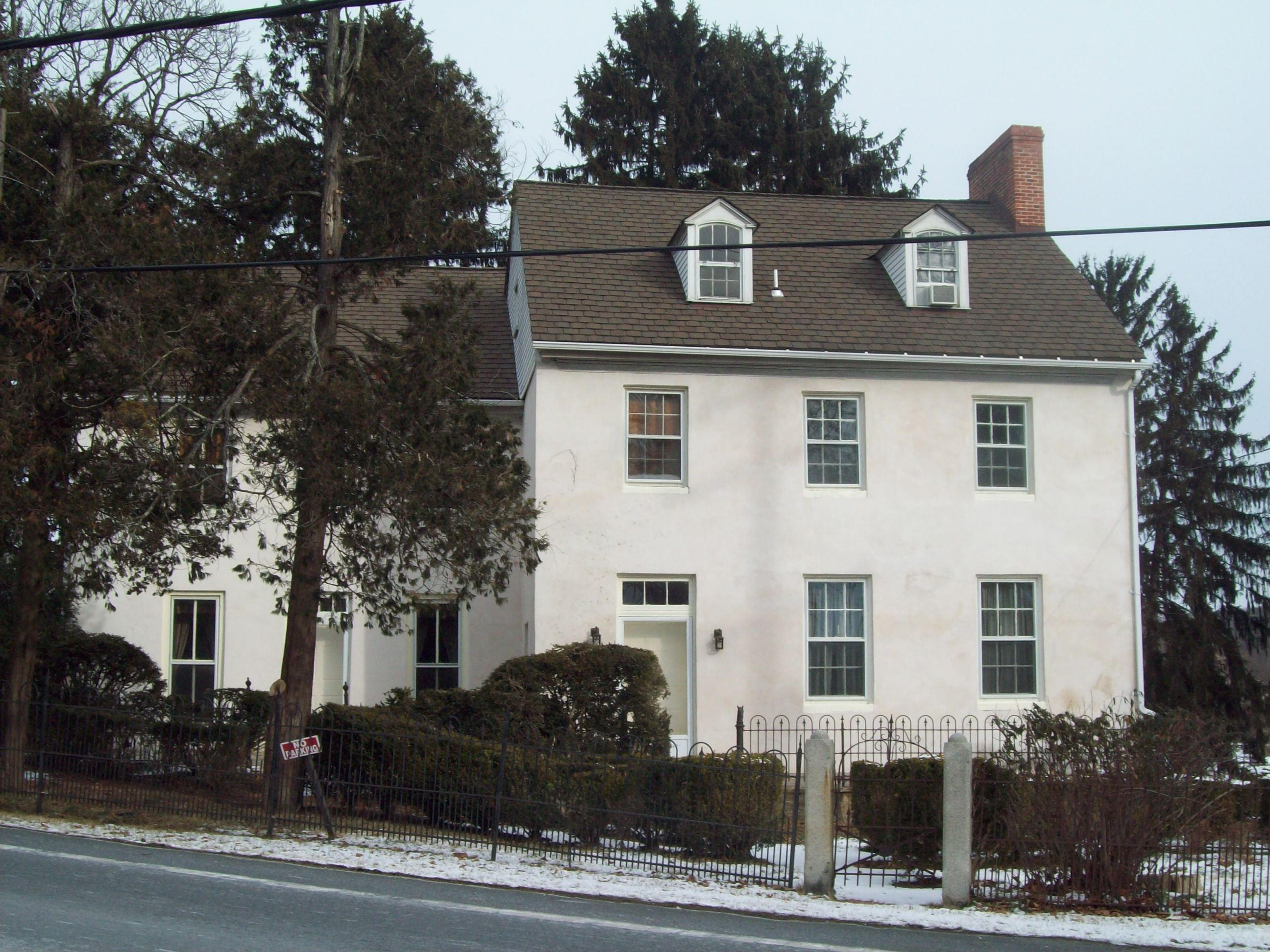
- Roberts Inn, January 2011

- Location within Maryland Location within the United States
- Location: 14610 Frederick Rd., Cooksville, Maryland
- Coordinates: 39°19′15.9″N 77°01′12.7″W
- Area: 18.6 acres (7.5 ha)
- NRHP reference No.: 06000661
- Added to NRHP: August 2, 2006

Roberts Inn, is a historic home and farm located at Cooksville, Howard County, Maryland. The complex consists of a 2 1/2-story stuccoed stone house with a reconstructed log wing built about 1808, and several 19th- to early-20th-century agricultural outbuildings, including a frame bank barn, a frame ground barn, a tile dairy, and a frame silo. The construction of the house coincided with the extension of the National Pike through the Cooksville area. Documentary and architectural evidence supports its use as a turnpike tavern from an early date. Tradition holds that Marquis de Lafayette breakfasted at Roberts Inn during his 1824 tour of America.

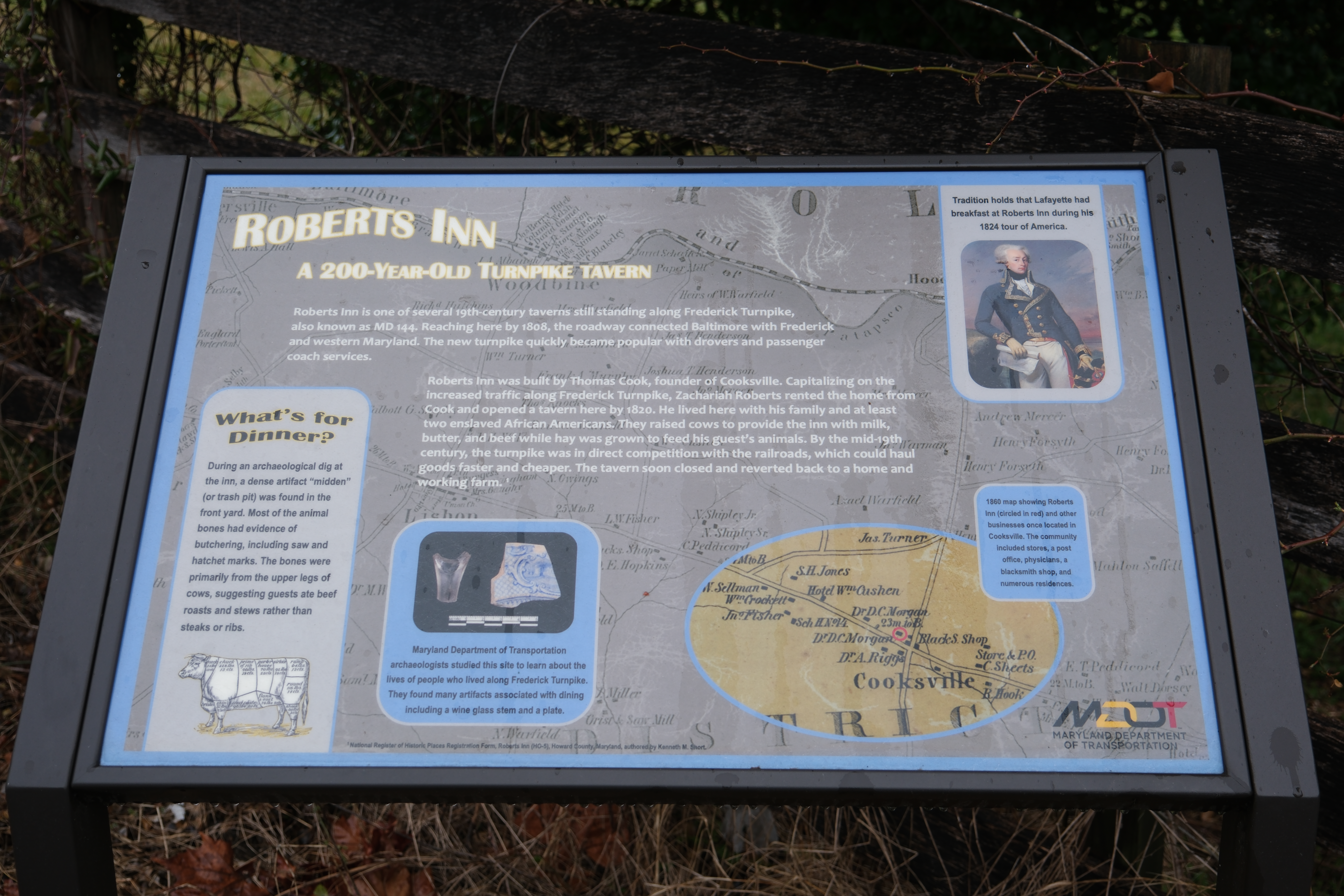
MDOT placard at Roberts Inn

It was listed on the National Register of Historic Places in 2006. It is located off of Route 144 off the intersection of Route 144 and Route 97.

== See also ==
- List of Howard County properties in the Maryland Historical Trust
- Red House Tavern
