= Al Huda School =

Al Huda School may refer to:

- Al Huda School (Maryland) - College Park, Maryland (Washington, DC area)
- Al-Huda School (New Jersey) - Paterson, New Jersey (New York area)
- Al-Huda School - Lower Allen Township, Pennsylvania (Harrisburg area)
- Al-Huda Islamic School - Tucson, Arizona
