= John T. H. Worthington =

American politician (1788–1849)

John Tolley Hood Worthington

Member of the U.S. House of Representatives from Maryland's 3rd district
- In office March 4, 1837 – March 3, 1841
- Preceded by: James Turner
- Succeeded by: James Wray Williams

Member of the U.S. House of Representatives from Maryland's 5th district
- In office March 4, 1831 – March 3, 1833
- Preceded by: Elias Brown
- Succeeded by: Isaac McKim

Personal details
- Born: November 1, 1788 "Shawan," near Baltimore, Maryland
- Died: April 27, 1849 (aged 60) "Shawan" near Baltimore, Maryland
- Party: Democratic
- Spouse: Mary Tolley Worthington
- Children: John Tolley Worthington; Annie Maria Worthington; Comfort Mary Worthington
- Parent(s): Walter Worthington; Sarah Hood

John Tolley Hood Worthington (November 1, 1788 – April 27, 1849) was a U.S. representative from Maryland and a slaveholder.

== Early life ==
John Tolley Hood Worthington was born on November 1, 1788, at "Shawan," near Baltimore, Maryland. He was the son of Walter Tolley Worthington (1765–1843) and Sarah Hood (ca. 1767–1850), daughter of John Hood, Jr. (1745–1794), by Hannah Barnes (ca. 1745–1772). Worthington received a limited schooling and engaged in agricultural pursuits.

== United States Congress ==
Worthington was elected as a Jacksonian to the Twenty-second Congress (March 4, 1831 – March 3, 1833). He was an unsuccessful candidate for reelection in 1832 to the Twenty-third Congress and for election in 1834 to the Twenty-fourth Congress.

Worthington was elected as a Democrat to the Twenty-fifth and Twenty-sixth Congresses, where he served from March 4, 1837, to March 3, 1841. After Congress, he resumed agricultural pursuits.

== Personal life ==
He was married to Mary Tolley Worthington (1790–1840), a cousin who was the daughter of John Worthington (ca. 1760–1834) and Mary Beale Worthington (1768–1839). Together, they had:

- Samuel Worthington (d. 1860)
- John Tolley Worthington (1813–1892), who married Mary Govane Hood (1813–1892), daughter of James Hood, of Hood's Mill, and Sarah Howard.
- Ann Maria Worthington (1821–1873), who married Charles Grosvenor Hanson (1815/6–1880), son of Alexander Contee Hanson (1786-1819)
- Comfort Mary Worthington (1823–1894), who married William B. Nelson, Jr.

In 1840 he owned 29 slaves according to the U.S. census. James Watkins, a fugitive slave from Maryland, mentions two daughters born out of wedlock by one or two enslaved women. He doesn't give the names of those daughters, but claims to have known them both personally. He calls the first one "a white slave" and reports that she remained enslaved until he (Watkins) freed her by bringing her to the Free States. According to Watkins, the second enslaved daughter was sold by her own father for $1800 for the purpose of breeding slave children. When she refused being used for that purpose out of her notion of Christian chastity, she was so severely flogged that she died in Watkins' presence.

Worthington died at "Shawan" in Baltimore County, Maryland, and was interred in a private cemetery on his farm. He was reinterred in St. John's Episcopal Churchyard in Worthington Valley, Maryland.

U.S. House of Representatives
Preceded by Elias Brown	Member of the U.S. House of Representatives from Maryland's 5th congressional district 1831–1833	Succeeded by Isaac McKim
Preceded by James Turner	Member of the U.S. House of Representatives from Maryland's 3rd congressional district 1837–1841	Succeeded by James Wray Williams
