= Inwood (surname) =

Inwood is a surname. Notable people with the surname include:

- George Inwood (1906–1940), Home Guard Section Commander posthumously awarded the George Cross
- Glenn Inwood (born 1968), New Zealand public relations specialist
- Henry William Inwood (1794–1843), English architect and classical scholar, the son of architect William Inwood
- Richard Inwood (1946–2019), Bishop of Bedford
- Roy Inwood (1890–1971), Australian recipient of the Victoria Cross
- Steve Inwood (born 1947–2025), American actor
- William Inwood (c. 1771 – 1843), English architect
