= James Turner (Maryland politician) =

American politician (1783–1861)

Member of the Maryland Senate from the Baltimore County district
- In office 1856–1858
- Preceded by: Hugh Ely
- Succeeded by: Andrew A. Lynch

Member of the Maryland House of Delegates from the Baltimore County district
- In office 1854–1854 Serving with Ephraim Bell, John T. Ford, Thomas T. Hutchins, William Thomas, Samuel Worthington
- In office 1852–1852 Serving with John Bosley, Charles A. Buchanan, John T. Ford, Philip Poultney, Levi A. Slade, John M. Wyse
- In office 1837–1838 Serving with Hugh Ely, John C. Orrick, Thomas C. Risteau, Henry M. Fitzhugh, Marcus R. Hook
- In office 1824–1832 Serving with Abraham H. Price, Adam Showers, John T. H. Worthington, James W. McCulloh, James M. Buchanan, Hugh Ely, William F. Johnson, John B. Holmes, Zachariah H. Worthington, Dixon Stansbury

Member of the U.S. House of Representatives from Maryland's 3rd district
- In office March 4, 1833 – March 3, 1837
- Preceded by: George C. Washington
- Succeeded by: John T. H. Worthington

Personal details
- Born: November 7, 1783 near Bel Air, Maryland, U.S.
- Died: March 28, 1861 (aged 77) near Parkton, Maryland, U.S.
- Resting place: Bethel Cemetery near Madonna, Maryland, U.S.
- Occupation: Politician; farmer

James Turner (November 7, 1783 – March 28, 1861) was an American politician from Maryland. He served as a United States Congressional representative from Maryland from 1833 to 1837. He served as a member of the Maryland House of Delegates from 1824 to 1832 and in 1837, 1838, 1852 and 1854. He was a member of the Maryland Senate from 1856 to 1858.

== Early life ==
James Turner was born on November 7, 1783, near Bel Air, Maryland. He completed preparatory studies at the Classic Academy of Madonna, Maryland.

== Career ==
Turner was captain of militia in the War of 1812. Afterwards, he moved to Parkton, Maryland, in 1811 and established a dairy farm. He served as collector of state and county taxes in 1817, and served as a justice of the peace in 1824.

Turner was a member of the Maryland House of Delegates, representing Baltimore County from 1824 to 1832. He was elected as a Jacksonian to the Twenty-third and Twenty-fourth Congresses, where he served from March 4, 1833, to March 3, 1837. He was an unsuccessful candidate for reelection to Congress, but he again served in the House of Delegates in 1837 and 1838 and in 1852 and 1854 and also as member of the Maryland Senate from 1856 to 1858. He engaged in farming at Parkton until his death. He owned over 1,000 acres (400 ha) of land in Baltimore County.

== Personal life ==
Turner died on March 28, 1861, at his Castle Calder home near Parkton. He was interred in Bethel Cemetery near Madonna, Maryland.

U.S. House of Representatives
Preceded by George Corbin Washington	Member of the U.S. House of Representatives from Maryland's 3rd congressional district 1833–1837	Succeeded by John T. H. Worthington
