= All Saints Cathedral, Camden Street =

Coordinates: 51°32′19.28″N 00°08′16.72″W

All Saints, Camden Town
- Greek Orthodox Cathedral Church of All Saints
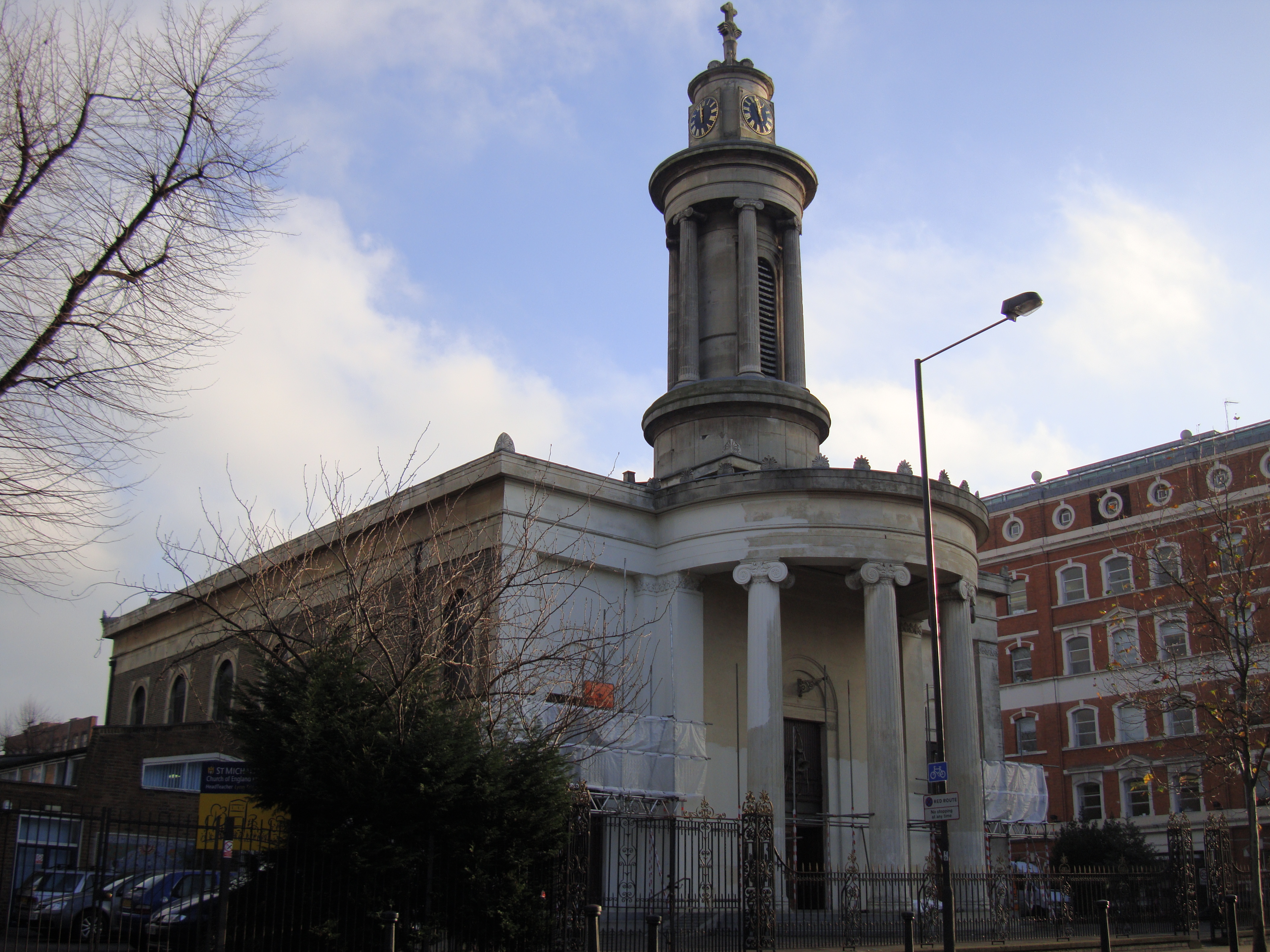
- All Saints' Cathedral
- All Saints, Camden Town
- Location: London, NW1
- Country: England
- Denomination: Greek Orthodox
- Previous denomination: Church of England
- Website: allsaintsgreekchurch.com

Architecture
- Architect(s): William and Henry Inwood
- Years built: 1822–1824

Administration
- Diocese: Thyateira and Great Britain

Clergy
- Priest(s): The Very Revd Protopresbyter George Zafeirakos; The Very Revd Archimandrite Vassilios Papavassiliou

All Saints Cathedral, Camden Street, London, formerly All Saints Church, Camden Town, St Pancras, Middlesex, is a church in the Camden Town area of London, England. It was built for the Church of England, but it is now a Greek Orthodox church known as the Greek Orthodox Cathedral Church of All Saints. It stands where Camden Street and Pratt Street meet.

== History ==
Camden Town was developed from the 1790s onwards in the then largely rural parish of St Pancras, on the northern fringe of London. The parish church was one of the oldest in England, but it had been in gradual decline since the 14th century when the weight of the parish population became the northern parts of what was becoming Kentish Town and Camden Town. In 1822 a new parish church, St Pancras New Church, on Euston Road in the southern part of the parish, was consecrated, but it was intended mainly to serve the population in its immediate vicinity. In 1818 a Church Building Act had been passed by Parliament to facilitate the construction of new churches in London's many new districts, including this one for Camden Town.

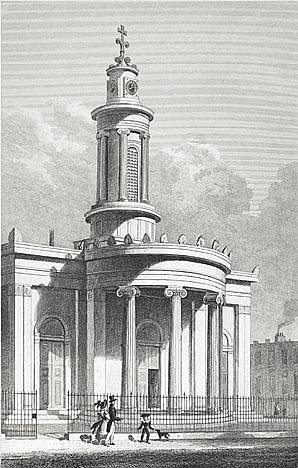
All Saints, Camden Town, in 1828.

The church was built between 1822 and 1824 and was known as first as the Camden Chapel, then, unofficially, as St Stephen's. It did not receive the dedication of All Saints until 1920. It was designed by the father and son team of William and Henry Inwood who were also responsible for St Pancras New Church. It is a fairly large building of yellow stock brick, with east and west ends faced in Portland stone. The plan is basically rectangular, with an eastern apse mirrored by a semi-circular portico at the west end. Just behind the portico is a cylindrical stone tower surrounded by columns, in imitation of the Choragic Monument of Lysicrates in Athens. The Ionic order is based on fragments brought back from Greece by Henry Inwood and now in the British Museum. The interior has a flat ceiling, with galleries on three sides supported by Ionic columns. The building has generally been praised, but both contemporary writers and later architectural critics such as Sir John Summerson have argued that the tower is too thin in proportion to the body of the church. It is a Grade I listed building.

It became a parish church in its own right in 1852. In the 19th century it had a large congregation, like many other Anglican churches in the Victorian era: an 1854 survey of church attendance found that the number of worshippers was 1,650 on Sunday mornings, 630 on Sunday afternoons and 1,430 on Sunday evenings. In the 20th century the congregation decreased and in 1948 All Saints became a Greek Orthodox church, retaining its dedication while St Michael's in Camden Road took over the parish, becoming the main Anglican church in Camden Town. The area acquired a large Greek speaking community in the decades after World War II, mostly from Cyprus, and the church is still well used, though many of the worshippers now come from the outer suburbs of London. In 1991 All Saints was raised to the status of a cathedral.

The church has been renovated a number of times. Most recently since January 2009 under the supervision of English Heritage and co-sponsored by the National Lottery and donations from the Greek Orthodox Community of the parish.
