= 1881 in architecture =

The year 1881 in architecture involved some significant architectural events and new buildings.

== Buildings and structures ==
=== Buildings ===
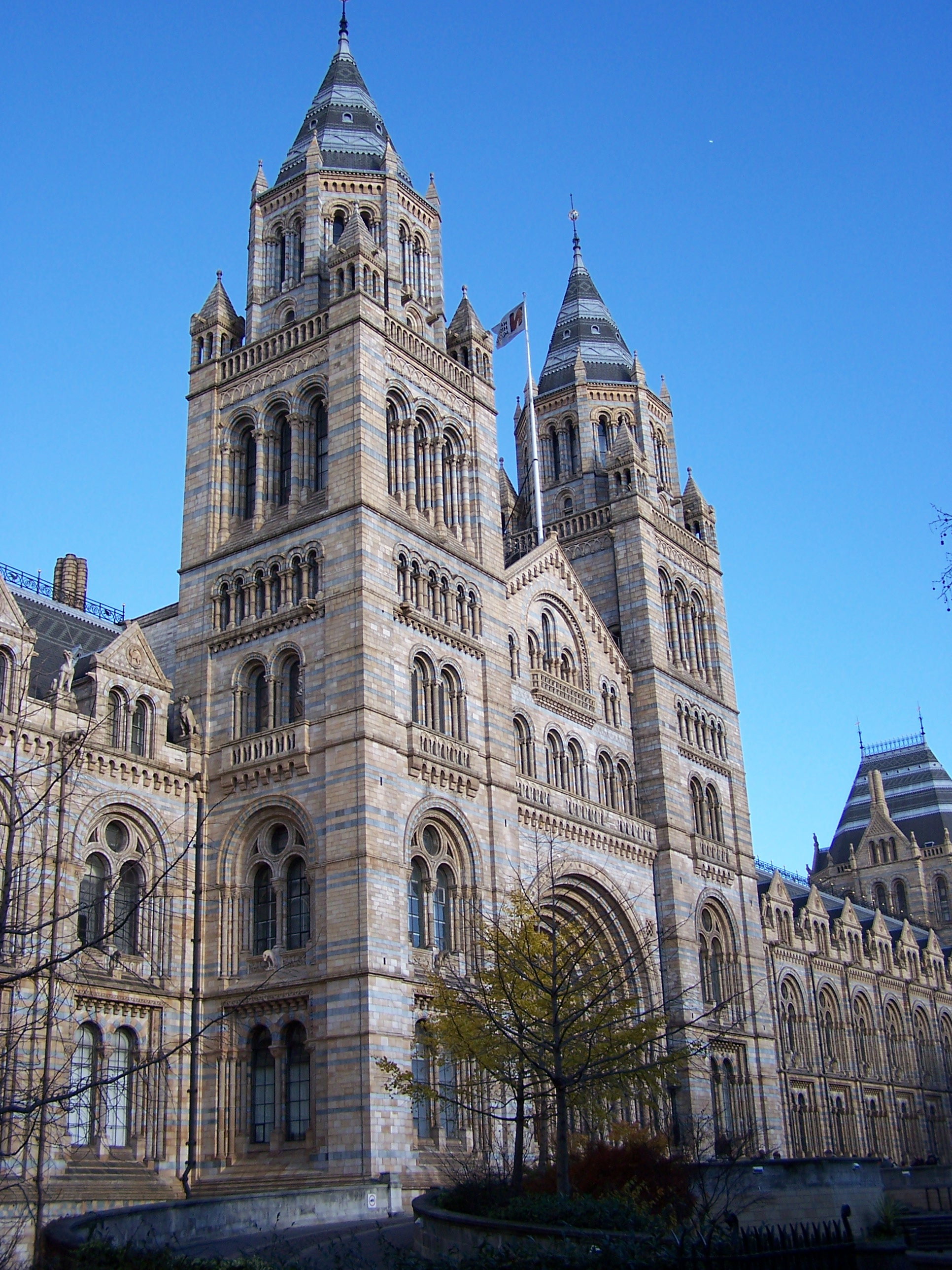
Natural History Museum, London

- Alþingishúsið in Reykjavík, Iceland, designed by Ferdinand Meldahl, is opened to house the Althing (national parliament)
- British Museum (Natural History) in London, England, designed by Alfred Waterhouse, is opened
- Founder's Building at Royal Holloway College, Egham in England, designed by William Henry Crossland, is completed
- Tweed Courthouse is completed by Leopold Eidlitz in New York City
- The National Theatre (Prague), designed in 1865–68 by Josef Zítek, is opened officially
- Construction of St Stephen's Church, Bournemouth, England, designed by John Loughborough Pearson, is begun

== Awards ==
- RIBA Royal Gold Medal – George Godwin.
- Grand Prix de Rome, architecture: Henri Deglane.

== Births ==
- March 29 – Raymond Hood, American Art Deco architect (died 1934)
- August 2 – Walter Godfrey, English architectural historian and architect (died 1961)
- date unknown – Nikolai Ladovsky, Russian avant-garde architect and educator, leader of the rationalist movement in 1920s architecture (died 1941)

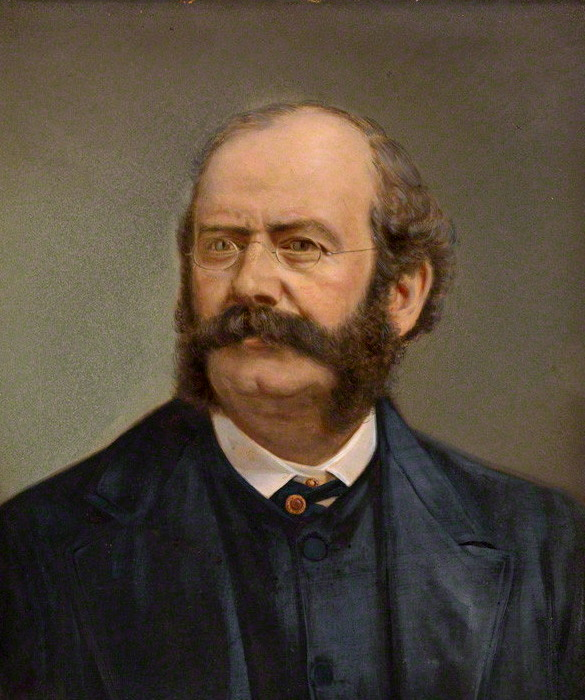
William Burges

== Deaths ==
- January 25 – Konstantin Thon, official architect of Imperial Russia during the reign of Tsar Nicholas (born 1794)
- April 20 – William Burges, English architect and designer (born 1827)
- December 14 – Decimus Burton, English architect and garden designer (born 1800)
- December 18 – George Edmund Street, English architect (born 1824)
