= Pleasant Valley, (Cooksville, Maryland) =

Pleasant Valley, Lost By Neglect
- Location within Maryland Location within the United States
- 39°20′27.1″N 76°59′45.4″W
- Nearest city: Cooksville, Maryland

History
- Built: 1754

Pleasant Valley, known as Lost by Neglect, is a historic home in Cooksville, Howard County, Maryland, United States.

The historic house is located on a portion of the 100-acre land grant named "Good Neighborhood" surveyed by Adam Shipley in 1742. In 1754, the section was part of a 103-acre land grant surveyed by Mordecai Selby Sr. called "Selby's Inheritance" and resurveyed as a 226-acre lot in 1775 as "Lost by Neglect". The original structure was built with stone construction in 1754. In 1859, a wooden addition was built by Henry Forsythe and given the name Pleasant Valley. In 1888 Henry Forsythe moved to the neighboring "Oaklands" plantation, leaving the estate in the hands of his heirs. Outbuilding include two barns, one of which was built with peg construction situated on land that has been subdivided from the estate. By 1976, the estate has been subdivided leaving only 14 acres of the original parcel remaining.

== See also ==
- List of Howard County properties in the Maryland Historical Trust
