= Elias Brown =

American politician

Member of the U.S. House of Representatives
- In office March 4, 1829 – March 3, 1831
- Preceded by: John Barney and Peter Little
- Succeeded by: John Tolley Hood Worthington

Member of the Maryland House of Delegates
- In office 1834–1835

Member of the Maryland Senate
- In office 1836–1838

Personal details
- Born: May 9, 1793 Near Baltimore, Maryland
- Died: July 3, 1857 (aged 64) Near Baltimore, Maryland
- Party: Jacksonian (later Whigs)
- Occupation: Politician

Elias Brown (May 9, 1793 – July 3, 1857) was a U.S. representative from Maryland.

Born near Baltimore, Maryland, Brown attended the common schools. He served as presidential elector on the ticket of James Monroe and Daniel D. Tompkins in 1820 and on the ticket of John Quincy Adams and Richard Rush in 1828.

Brown was elected as a Jacksonian to the Twenty-first Congress, where he served from March 4, 1829 to March 3, 1831. He also served as member of the Maryland House of Delegates in 1834 and 1835, and as member of the Maryland Senate from 1836 to 1838. In 1836, he served as presidential elector on the ticket of William Henry Harrison and John Tyler, and served as delegate to the State constitutional convention the same year. He died near Baltimore, Maryland, and is interred in a private cemetery near Eldersburg, Maryland.

U.S. House of Representatives
Preceded by John Barney and Peter Little	Member of the U.S. House of Representatives from Maryland's 5th congressional district 1829–1831	Succeeded by John Tolley Hood Worthington
