= Al Huda School (Maryland) =

Private Islamic school located in College Park, Maryland

Location
- 5301 Edgewood Road; College Park, Maryland 20740; United States; 39.01495189999999°N 76.91150449999998°W

Information
- Type: Private school
- Established: 1995
- Website: alhuda.org

Al Huda School is a private Islamic school in College Park, Maryland. Currently, it has grades K–12, with boys and girls in separate classes. As of 2018 it had over 700 students in all programs, with 460 students in its day school.

In 2013 the school and its affiliated mosque planned a new campus in the former Woodmont Academy in Cooksville, Western Howard County. Several area residents objected to the redevelopment plan proposed to the county government on the grounds that it would interfere with the area's rural character. In 2013, former James N. Robey aide Sang Oh representing Dar-us-Salaam, an Islamic organization that operates Al Huda, petitioned Howard County to rezone the Woodmont Property. The zoning application was dropped, but plans to move the Dar-us-Salaam facility from College Park to Cooksville proceeded as a conditional use.

The school has a prayer hall that's open to public outside school hours. During school season they offer jumu'ah at an alternate nearby place.

== History ==
Al-Huda School is a project of Dar-us-Salaam, which was founded in the early 1990s to establish a Muslim community. The school opened in September 1995 with 26 students in kindergarten through 2nd grade. In 1997, it moved from Silver Spring, Maryland, to its current location in College Park. The high school section was added in the fall of 2007, and the first class graduated in 2011.

== See also ==
- Islam in Maryland
