= Woodmont Academy =

Former private school in Cooksville, Maryland, United States

Location
- 14196 Frederick Rd; Cooksville, Maryland 21723; United States; 39°20′47″N 77°00′25″W

Information
- Type: Private School
- Motto: "Semper Altius" - Always Higher
- Religious affiliation: Legionaries of Christ
- Denomination: Catholicism
- Established: 1995
- Principal: John Farrell
- Enrollment: 185 (2011)
- Website: woodmontacademy.org

Woodmont Academy was a private school in Howard County, Maryland, affiliated with the Legionaries of Christ, a Catholic religious institute.

== History ==
Woodmont Academy was founded in 1995 by the Legionaries of Christ in Granite, Baltimore County, Maryland. There were 49 students in the first class.

Plans to relocate to Glenwood were cancelled in 2000 when local residents objected. The school chose an alternate 66-acre (27 ha) site in Cooksville, to which it relocated in 2003 over similar local opposition.

In 2010, the Vatican condemned Marcial Maciel, the former leader of the Legion, for molesting underage males and fathering at least one child of a student.

Due to declining enrollment (falling from 301 to 160 in two years), economic conditions, and fallout from the Legion of Christ controversy, Woodmont Academy closed on June 10, 2011, after the 2010–11 school year. At the time of the closure, the school was apparently planning to change from Legion of Christ controlled to a lay-led institution.

== Curriculum ==
The school used the "Integral Foundation" curriculum emphasizing character development.

== Redevelopment ==
In 2013, former James N. Robey aide Sang Oh representing Dar-us-Salaam, an Islamic organization that operates Al Huda School in College Park, petitioned Howard County to rezone the former Woodmont property in Cooksville. The zoning application was dropped, but plans to move the Dar-us-Salaam facility from College Park to Cooksville proceeded as a conditional use.
