= London Festival of Contemporary Church Music =

Annual church music festival

The London Festival of Contemporary Church Music is an annual music festival held in London.

== History ==
The London Festival of Contemporary Church Music was founded in 2002 by Christopher Batchelor at St Pancras New Church. Batchelor remains (2022) the artistic director. It takes place around the feast day of St Pancras on 12 May, being the patron saint of the parish and church.

== Artists and repertoire ==
The festival now lasts nine days, and features new works by both established and new composers. It includes a choral evensong broadcast on BBC Radio 3 and liturgical services and concerts all over London. In addition to St Pancras New Church, the festival takes place at churches including Westminster Abbey, Westminster Cathedral, the Temple Church, Southwark Cathedral, St Paul's Cathedral, St Paul's, Covent Garden and St George's Chapel, Windsor Castle.

Established composers who have written works for the festival include Michael Berkeley, Michael Finnissy, Gabriel Jackson and Cecilia McDowall. Some years have a particular focus: in 2013 there was a series of works produced as a tribute to Philip Moore, the former organist of York Minster, and in 2021 a gala concert as a tribute to Cecilia McDowall.

== Aims ==
The principal aim of the festival is to showcase performances of recent and contemporary liturgical music and organ music.
