= Sarah Jane Powell Log Cabin =

Historic home located in Maryland

- Location within Maryland
- 39°18′33″N 77°01′16″W
- Location: 2240 Maryland Route 97 Cookville.

History
- Built: 1850-1859

Site notes
- Area: 3 acres (1.2 ha)
- Governing body: Private

Sarah Jane Powell Log Cabin is a historic home located at Cooksville, Howard County, Maryland, United States.

In 1850, Thomas Hood was one of three founding county commissioners of Howard County. In 1859 Thomas Hood built the log cabin on his property for his slave Sarah Jane Powell (born 1827) for her "unwavering fidelity and general moral worth as a servant". The cabin is a 3-bay-wide, 1 1/2-story-tall structure with a brick fireplace. Sarah Jane Powell married Alfred Dorsey and had their first child in the cabin in 1865. In May 1869, the 1 1/4-acre property the cabin resided on named "Poverty Discovered" was deeded to Sarah Jane Dorsey. The cabin has been occupied by over seven generations of Dorseys, with a family graveyard located on the property. The property is just north of a former crossroads town named Inwood, and adjacent to a 30-acre parcel owned by the Board of Education in the 1970s, which has not been developed.

== See also ==
- List of Howard County properties in the Maryland Historical Trust
- Mount Gregory Methodist Church - Also built on Thomas Hood plantation land
