= Shipley's Adventure =

- Location within Maryland
- 39°20′02″N 77°01′30″W
- Location: 14830 Old Frederick Rd, Woodbine, Maryland (Cooksville)

History
- Built: 1761

Site notes
- Architectural style: Stone

Shipley's Adventure is a historic plantation home located in Cooksville and (Woodbine) Howard County, Maryland.

The house is the homestead of George Shipley, and Catherine Ogg and was part of the 1260 acre "Shipley's Adventure" land grant patented on 7 April 1761. In 1790, "Shipley's Enlargement" was added to the estate. The house is built around a 1761 log cabin containing a loft which windows have been added. In 1972 a family room was added to the "telescoping" building. The estate has been subdivided down to 16.53 acres by the 1970s with the Perilla family converting the agricultural land for wine making. The property remains privately owned.

== See also ==
- Curtis-Shipley Farmstead
