= Red House Tavern =

- Location within Maryland
- Interactive map of Red House Tavern
- 39°19′49.2″N 77°01′02.5″W
- Nearest city: Cooksville, Maryland

History
- Built: 18th century

The Red House Tavern is located in Cooksville in Howard County, Maryland, United States. It was situated midway along the Old Frederick Road between Baltimore and Frederick, used as a rest stop for travelers. The house is the birthplace of Thomas Cook born in 1768, who founded Cooksville in 1802.

The 1 1/2-story-tall stone house was built in the 18th century when the region consisted mostly of slave-operated tobacco plantations. The building was built with a high pitched roof and dormers. The house was described by Ferdinand Baynard in his 1791 writings as a "rather poor" tavern, kept by a widow of "admirable reserve". George Washington was reported to have stayed at the inn during his travels along the main western road of the era. The original kitchen was located in the basement of the stone building with iron bars set to discourage looting. A log house is situated southwest of the building. A frame kitchen addition was later added to the rear of the building. In 1976, the property consisted of 125 acres (51 ha) owned by H.B.L. Properties (E. Brooklee). The property has since been subdivided into a series of pipe-stem residential lots, with the original parcel maintaining a large commercial construction operation on the property.

== See also ==
- List of Howard County properties in the Maryland Historical Trust
