= St Pancras New Church =

Coordinates: 51°31′37.76″N 00°07′48.29″W

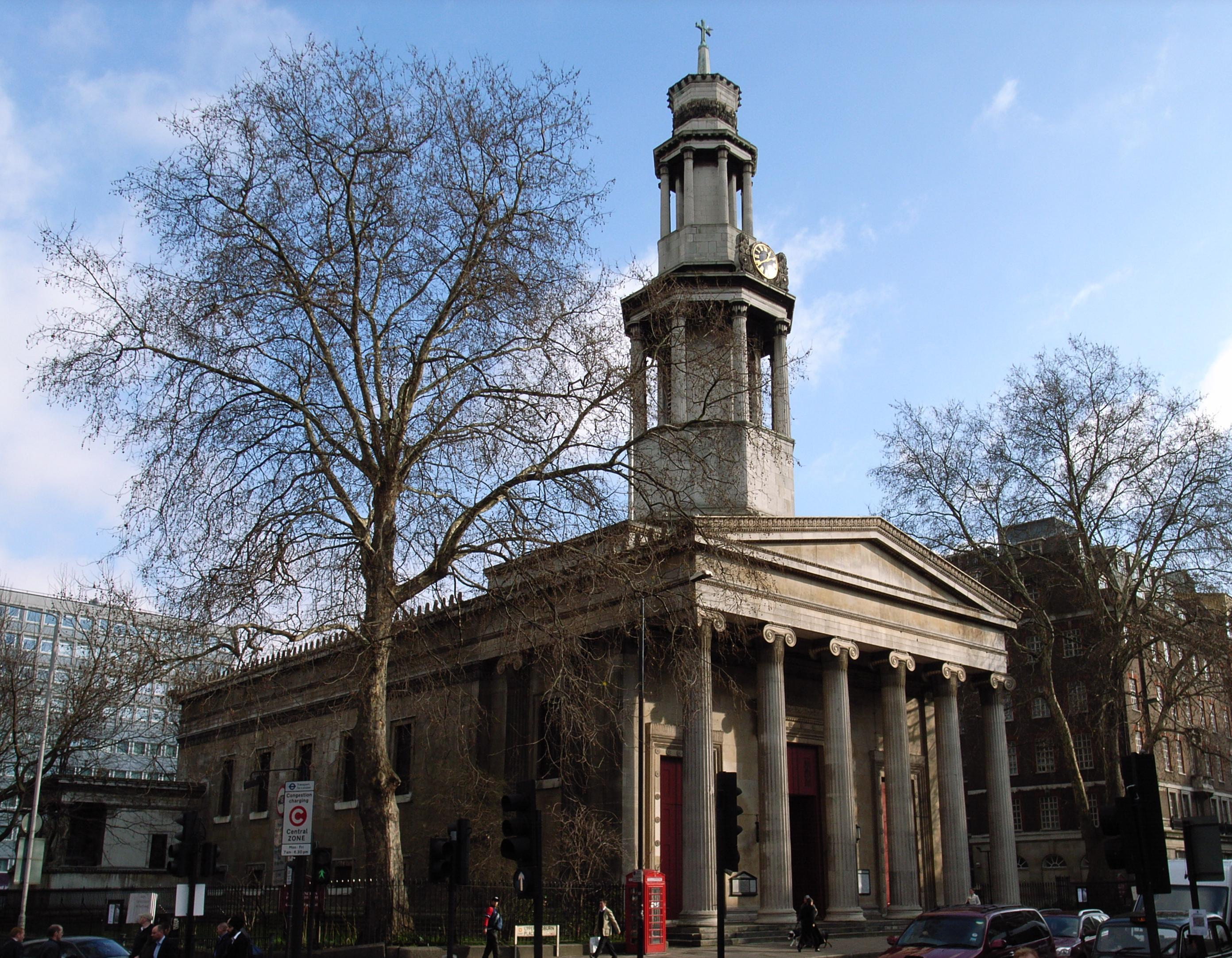
- St Pancras Church, 2007
- St Pancras New Church
- Location: Euston Road, London
- Country: England
- Denomination: Church of England
- Churchmanship: Liberal
- Website: www.stpancraschurch.org

History
- Dedicated: 1822

Architecture
- Architect(s): William and Henry William Inwood
- Style: Neoclassical, Greek Revival
- Years built: 1819

Administration
- Diocese: London

Listed Building – Grade I
- Official name: Church of St Pancras
- Designated: 10 June 1954
- Reference no.: 1066500

St Pancras New Church is a Greek Revival church in St Pancras, London, built in 1819–22 to the designs of William and Henry William Inwood. The church is one of the most important 19th-century churches in England and is a Grade I listed building, and is still in use as a place of worship. Regular services are hosted at 11am on Sundays, and the church is the principal church for the Borough of Camden - hosting their civic services.

Known for its strong musical heritage, the church regularly offers a platform to students from the London conservatoires, and is the home of the London Festival of Contemporary Church Music (established in 2002), the St Pancras Music Festival, and is used as a major concert venue in London.

The Crypt Gallery (www.cryptgallery.org.uk) is based at the church.

== Location ==
The church is in the southern part of the historic parish and later borough of St Pancras, close to its boundary with the parish of Bloomsbury. It is situated on the south side of Euston Road, at the corner of Upper Woburn Place, in the borough of Camden.

When it was built its west front faced into the south-east corner of Euston Square, which had been laid out on either side of what was then simply known as the "New Road".

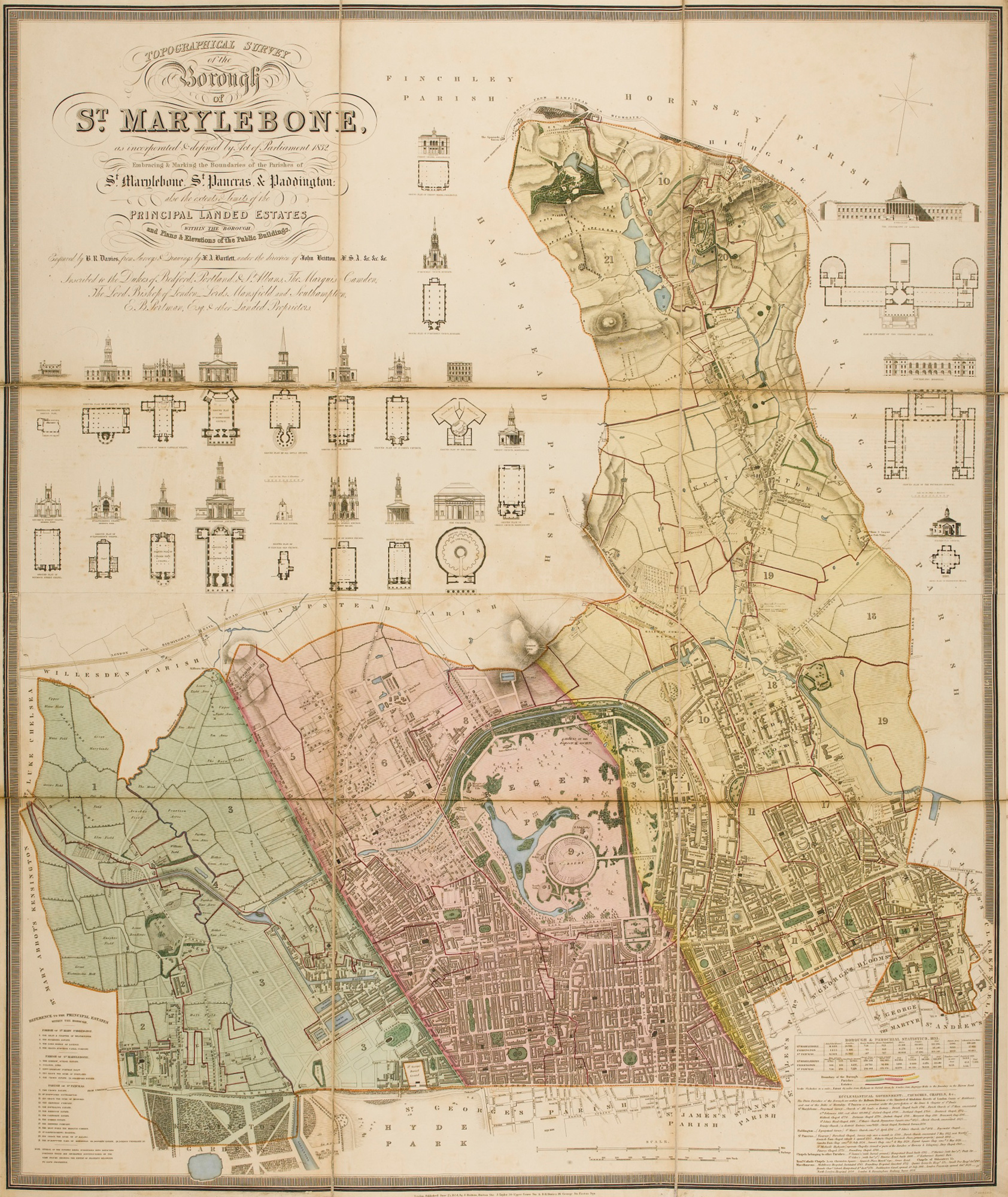
The Ancient Parishes of – west to east – Paddington and St Marylebone (in the modern City of Westminster), and St Pancras (in the modern London Borough of Camden) in 1834

It was intended as a new principal church for the parish of St Pancras, which stretched from a point about 50 metres north of Oxford Street as far north as Highgate. The St Pancras Old Church, the original parish church was a small ancient building to the north of New Road. This had become neglected following a growth in population in the north of the parish, and by the early 19th century services were only held there once a month, worship at other times taking place in a chapel in Kentish Town.

With the northwards expansion of London into the area, the population in the southern part of the parish grew, and a new church was felt necessary. Following the opening of the new parish church, the Old Church became a chapel of ease to it, although it was later given its own separate ecclesiastical parish (the civil parish remaining undivided). During the 19th century many further churches were built to serve the burgeoning population of the original parish of St Pancras, and by 1890 it had been divided into 33 ecclesiastical parishes.

== History ==
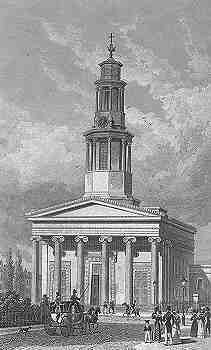
St Pancras New Church soon after completion in the 1820s.

The church was built primarily to serve the newly built up parts of the parish close to Euston Road. The building of St Pancras church was agreed in 1816 and approved in the St. Pancras Parish Church and Parochial Chapel Act 1816 (56 Geo. 3. c. xxxix). After a competition involving thirty or so tenders, designs by the local architect William Inwood, in collaboration with his son Henry William Inwood, were accepted. The builder was Isaac Seabrook. The first stone was laid by the Duke of York at a ceremony on 1 July 1819. It was carved with a Greek inscription, of which the English translation was "May the light of the blessed Gospel thus ever illuminate the dark temples of the Heathen".

The church was consecrated by the Bishop of London on 7 May 1822, and the sermon was preached by the vicar of St Pancras, James Moore. The total cost of the building, including land and furnishings, was £76,679, making it the most expensive church to be built in London since the rebuilding of St Paul's Cathedral. It was designed to seat 2,500 people.

== Architecture ==
The church is in a Greek revival style, using the Ionic order. It is built from brick, faced with Portland stone, except for the portico and the tower above the roof, which are entirely of stone. All the external decoration, including the capitals of the columns is of terracotta.

The Inwoods drew on two ancient Greek monuments, the Erechtheum and the Tower of the Winds, both in Athens, for their inspiration. The doorways are closely modelled on those of the Erechtheum, as is the entablature, and much of the other ornamentation. Henry William Inwood was in Athens at the time that the plans for St Pancras were accepted, and brought plaster casts of details of the Erechtheum, and some excavated fragments, back to England.

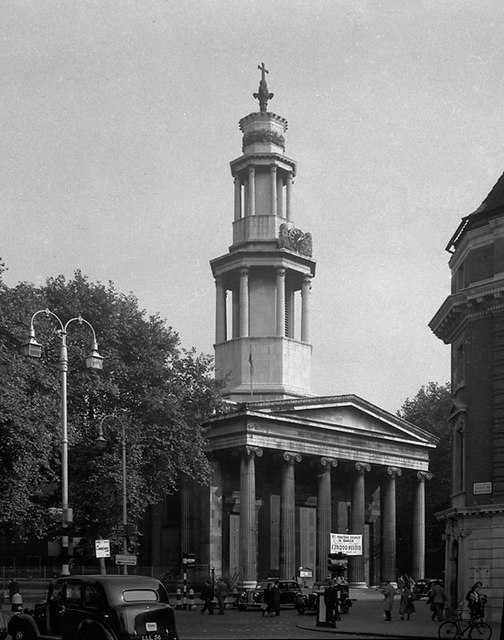
The church pictured in 1948.

The west end follows the basic arrangement of portico, vestibules and tower established by James Gibbs at St Martin-in-the-Fields. The octagonal domed ceiling of the vestibule is in imitation of the Tower of the Winds, and the tower above uses details from the same structure. At the east end is an apse, flanked by the church's most original features: two tribunes designed in imitation of the Erechtheum, with entablatures supported by caryatids. Unlike those on the Erechtheum, each caryatid holds a symbolic extinguished torch or an empty jug, appropriate for their positions above the entrances to the burial vault. There is a stone sarcophagus behind the figures in each tribune, and the cornices are studded with lion's heads. The caryatids are made of terracotta, constructed in sections around cast-iron columns, and were modelled by John Charles Felix Rossi, who provided all the terracotta on the building. The upper levels of the tribunes were designed as vestries.

Access to the church is through three doorways ranged under the portico. There are no side doors. Inside, the church has a flat ceiling with an uninterrupted span of 60 feet (18 m), and galleries supported on cast-iron columns. The interior of the apse is in the form of one half of a circular temple, with six columns, painted to imitate marble, raised on a plinth.

The interior includes a pulpit (once taller) and reading desk made from timber from the Fairlop Oak, a famous tree which grew in Hainault Forest at Ilford in Essex, and which fell in a storm in 1820.

The crypt, which extends the whole length of the church, was designed to contain 2,000 coffins, but fewer than five hundred interments had taken place by 1854, when the practice was ended in all London churches. It served as an air-raid shelter in both world wars and is now used as an art gallery.

The church was closed for two years from 1951 for structural renovation made necessary by dry rot and war damage. The North Chapel was added in 1970 and the interior was restored in 1981. The steps of the church were one of several sites used for floral tributes after the 7 July 2005 London bombings. The building in Grade I listed.

== Gallery ==
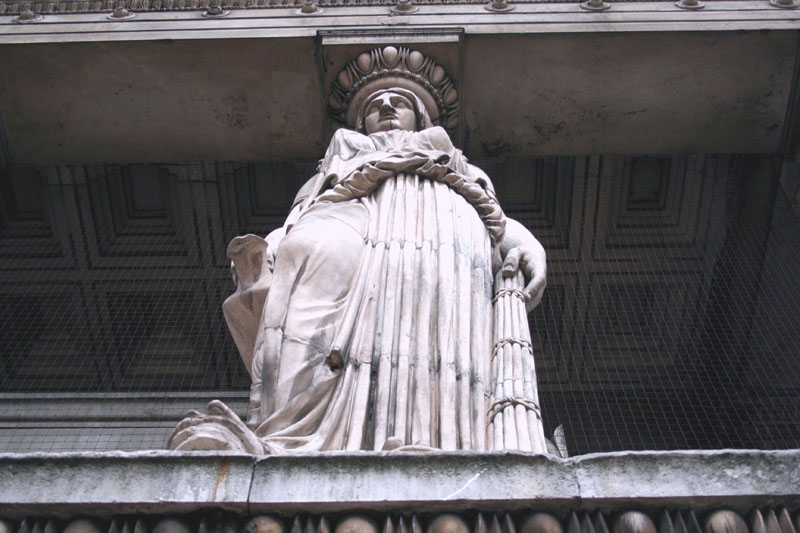
Caryatid, north elevation

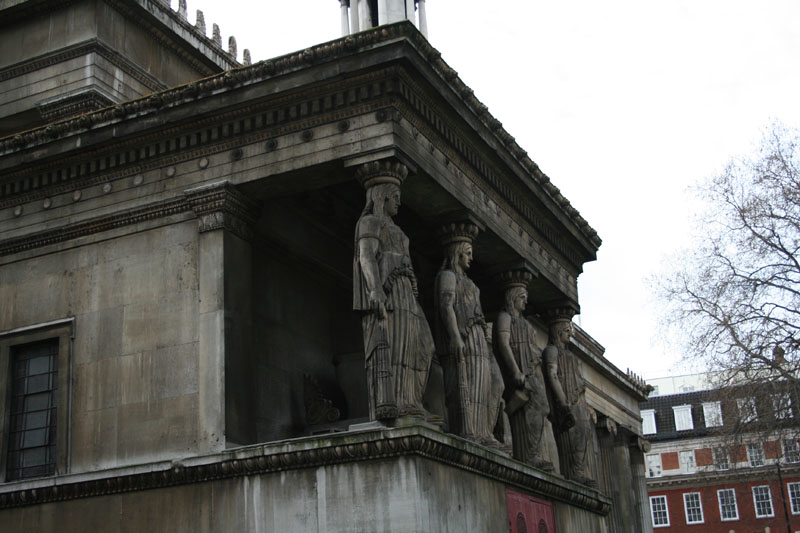
Caryatids, north elevation

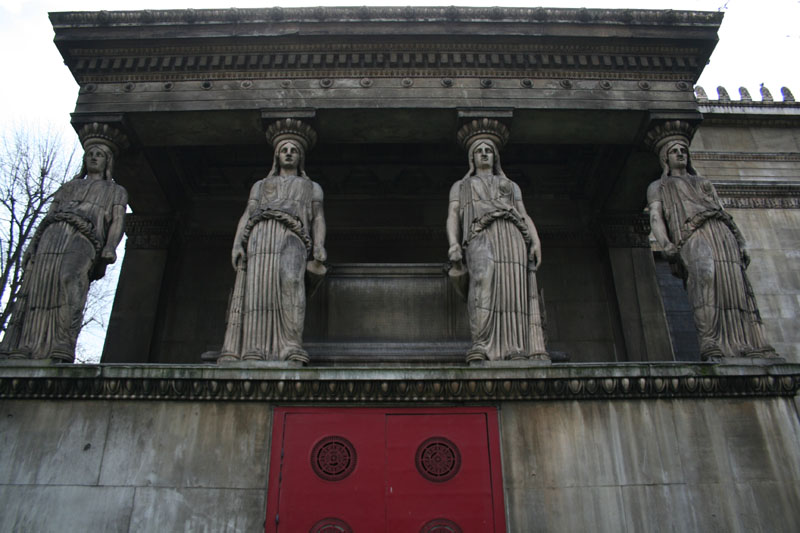
Caryatids, north elevation

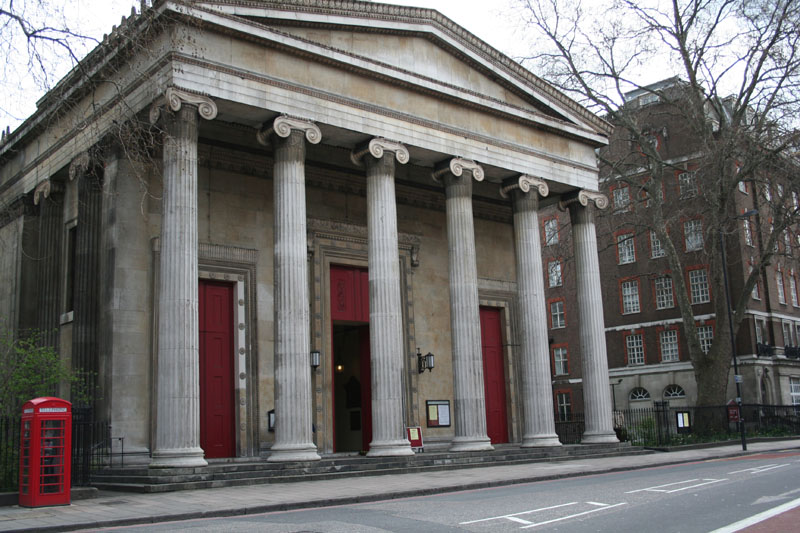
Western portico

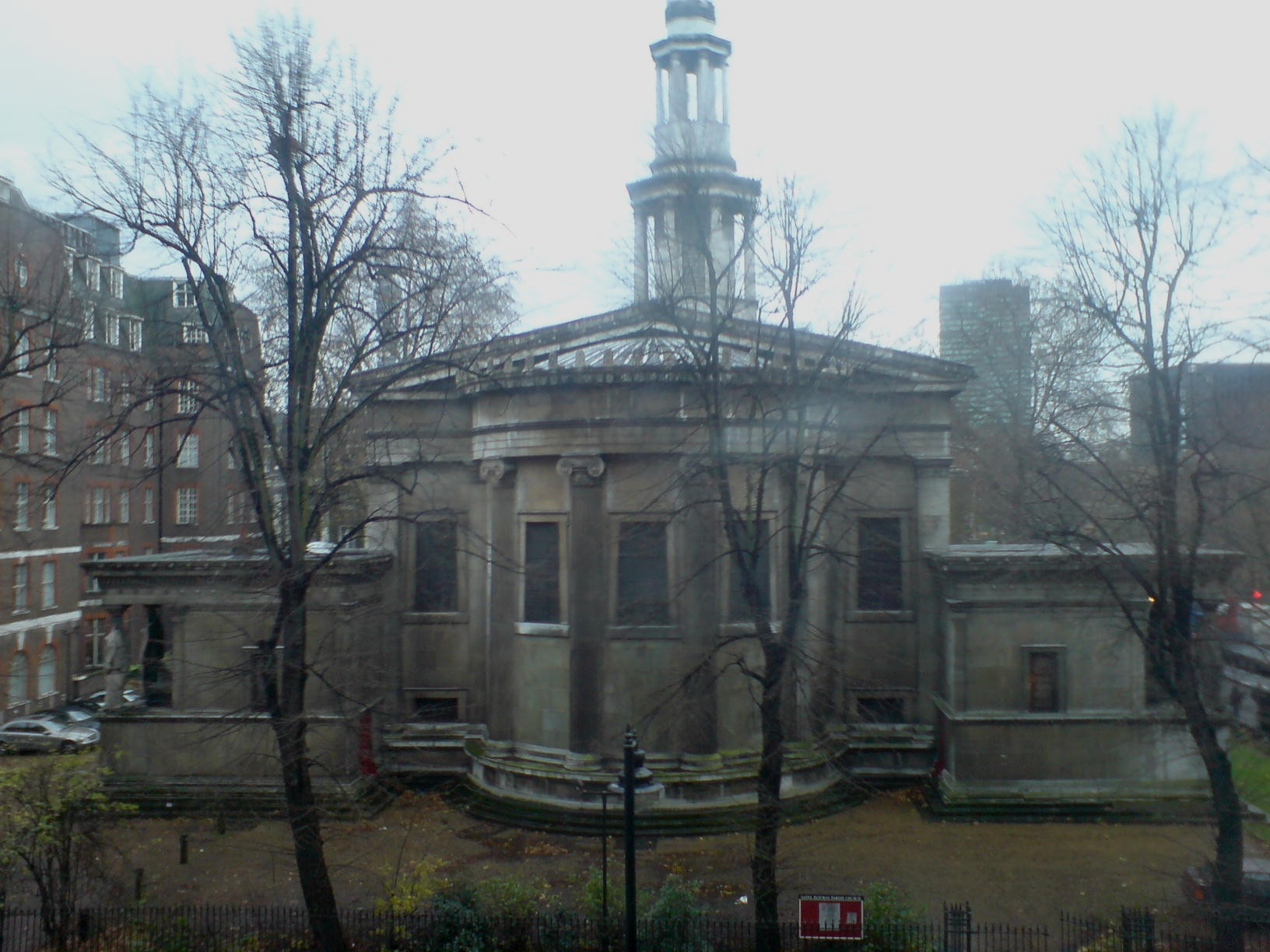
Exterior of the east end

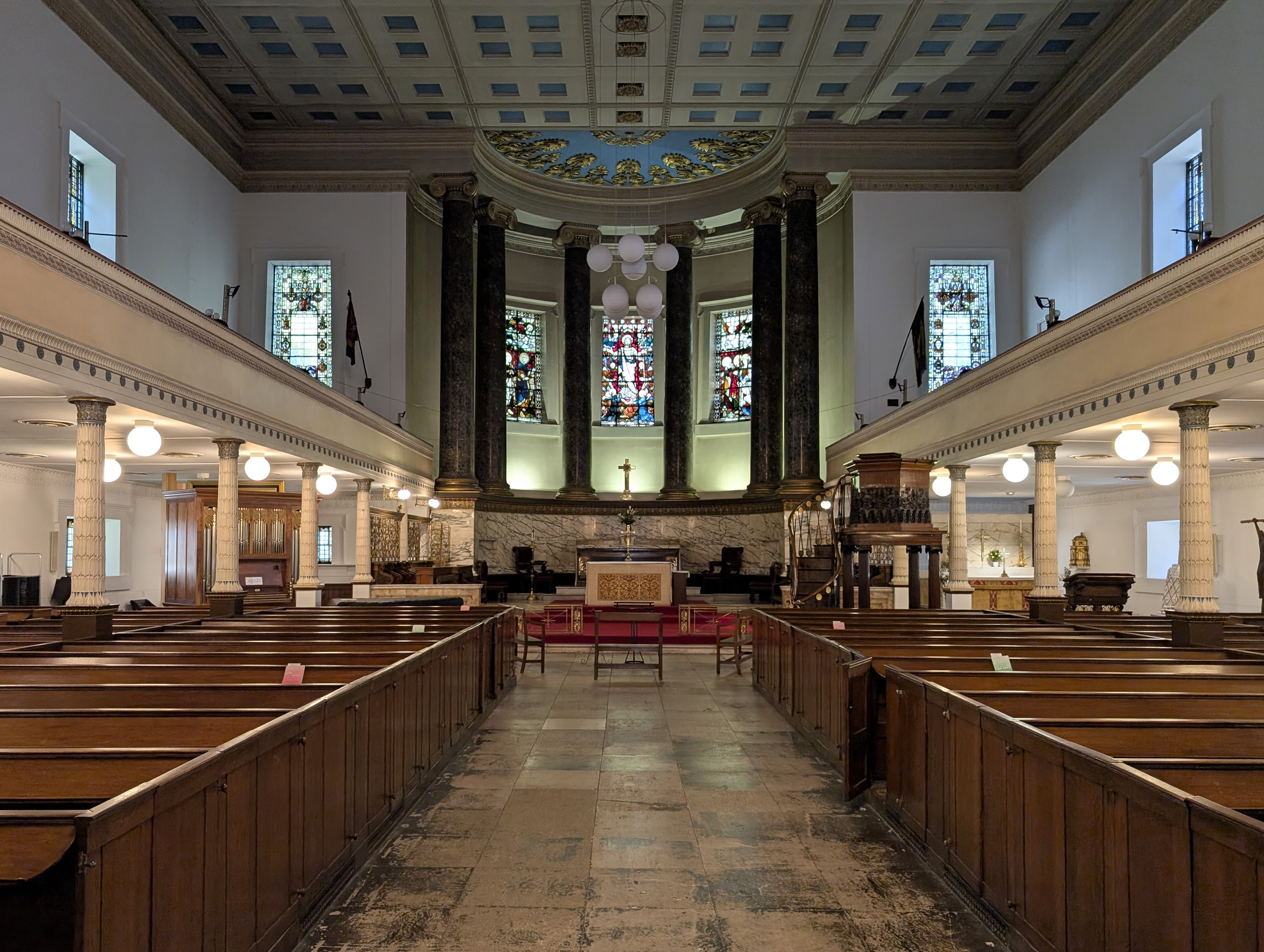
Interior

== Sources ==
- Palmer, Samuel (1870). St Pancras. London.
- Richardson, John (1991). Camden Town and Primrose Hill Past. Historical Publications. ISBN 978-0-948667-12-1.
- Summerson, John (1988). Georgian London. Barrie & Jenkins. ISBN 0-7126-2095-8.
