= Hood's Mill, Maryland =

Unincorporated community in Maryland, U.S.

Coordinates: 39°21′11″N 77°00′56″W

Hood's Mill is an unincorporated community located in Howard County and Carroll County in the state of Maryland in the United States of America.

Hood's mill is community formed at the Benjamin Hood's Hood Haven on the Patapsco River. Later Hood's Mill was known as a stop along the B&O railroad with a shipping center run by the Hammond family.

== See also ==
- Baltimore and Ohio Railroad
