= Henry William Inwood =

British architect and scholar (1794–1843)

Henry William Inwood (22 May, 1794 – 20 March, 1843) was an English architect, archaeologist, classical scholar and writer. He was the joint architect, with his father William Inwood of St Pancras New Church.

== Biography ==
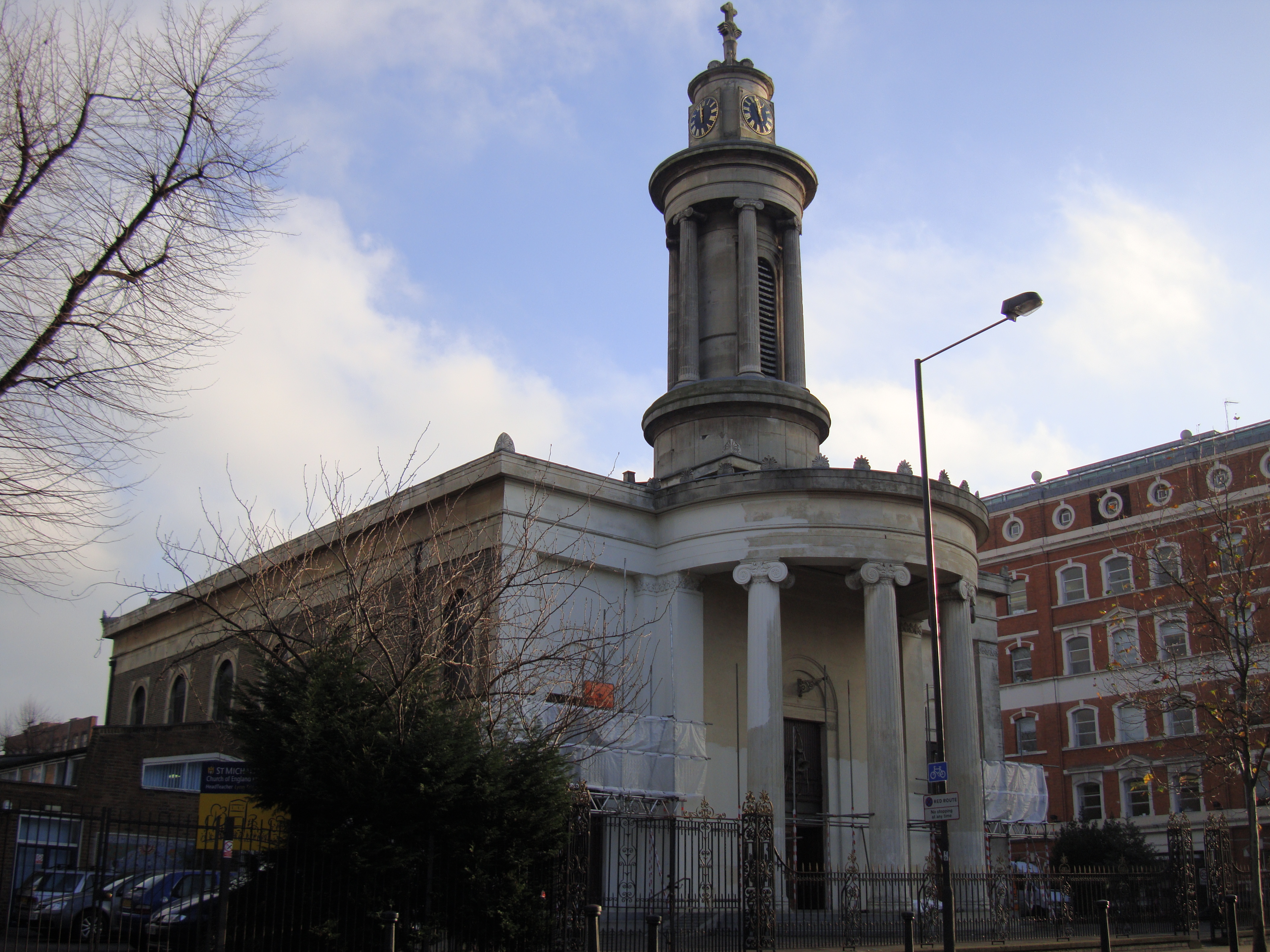
All Saints' Camden Town, from the north-west

He was the son of the architect William Inwood, with whom he collaborated on a number of churches, including St Pancras New Church (1819–22), the commission for which was won in an open competition. John Summerson believed that he was the main designer of St Pancras – which he describes as a "skilful and mature work" – his father not having previously designed any architecturally ambitious buildings. The design drew closely on Ancient Greek models, imitating elements from the Erechtheum and the Tower of the Winds in Athens. Inwood had not been to Greece at the time the initial design was submitted in May 1818, but travelled there soon afterward, making careful observations of the buildings on which St Pancras was based. He later published the results of his studies as The Erechtheion at Athens: Fragments of Athenian Architecture and a few remains in Attica, Megara, and Epirus (1827).

The Inwoods collaborated on two other Greek Revival churches in the parish of St Pancras: All Saints, Camden Town (1822–4), and St Peter's, Regent Square (1822–5, now demolished). They were also joint architects of St Mary's Chapel, Somers Town in the same parish, built in 1824–7 in a naive "Carpenter's Gothic" style. Inwood collaborated with E.N. Clifton on two churches: the Gothic St. Stephen, Canonbury (1837-9), and the Neoclassical St James Islington (1837-8)

In 1834 he published a pamphlet entitled Of the Resources of Design in the Architecture of Greece, Egypt, and other Countries, obtained by the Studies of the Architects of those Countries from Nature, which suggested that the flutings of Doric columns were taken from reeds, mineral formations or seashells; that Egyptian mummies were wrapped in imitation of the cocoons of moths, and that the image of the sphinx was inspired by a butterfly chrysalis.

Inwood died in a shipwreck on a journey to Spain when the ship he was in sank with no survivors.

== Gallery of architectural work ==
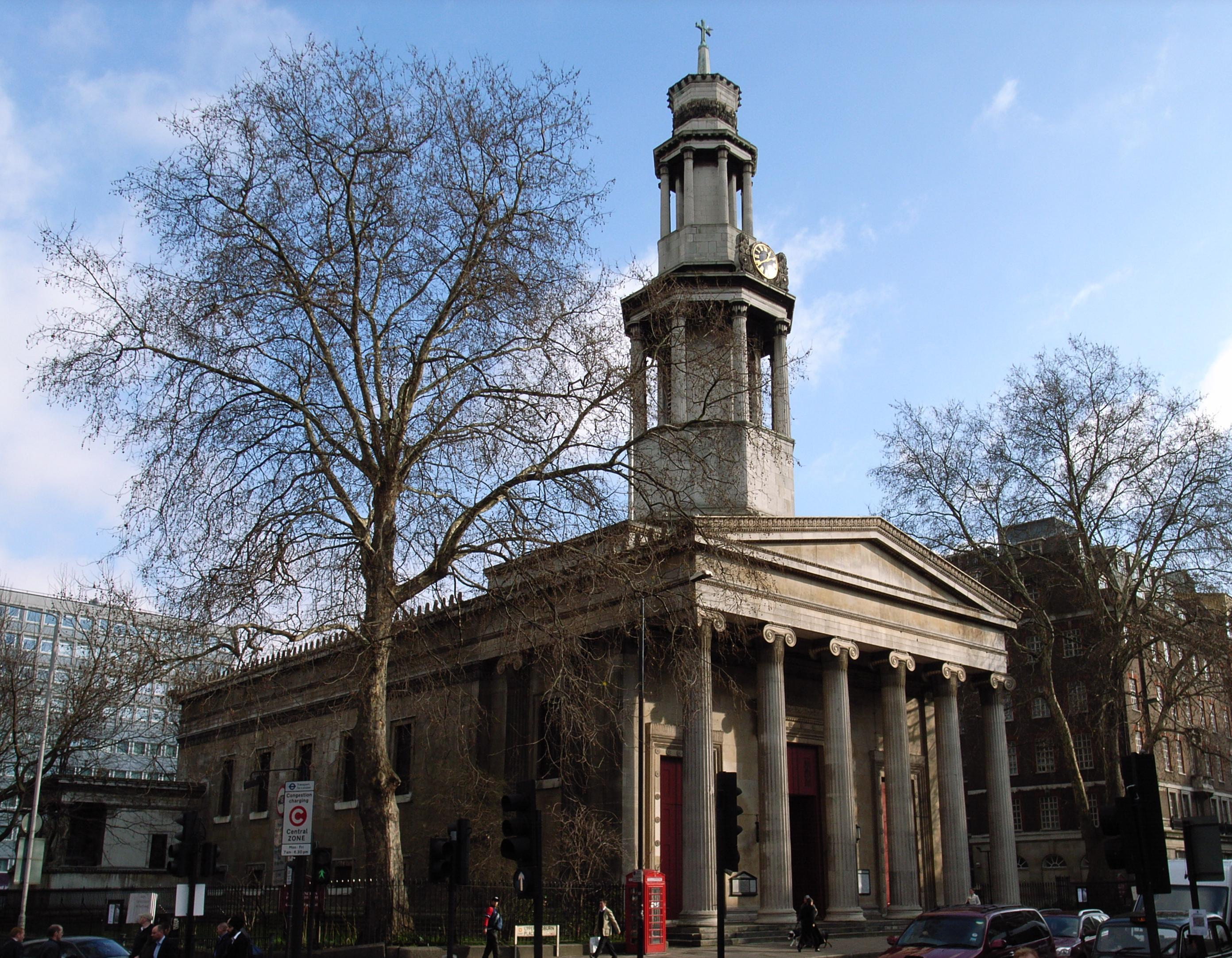
St. Pancras Parish New Church from the north-west

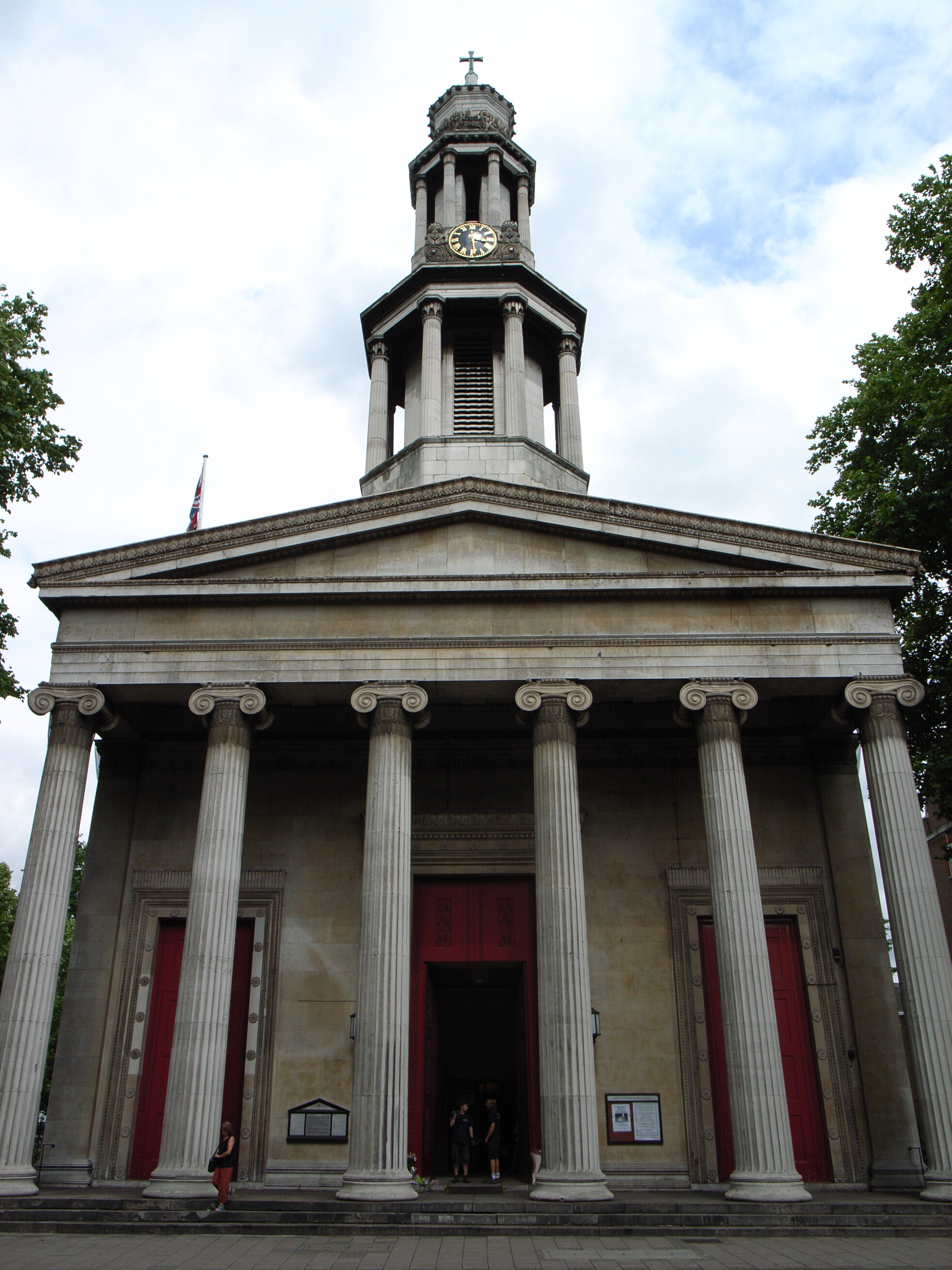
St. Pancras Parish New Church, west front

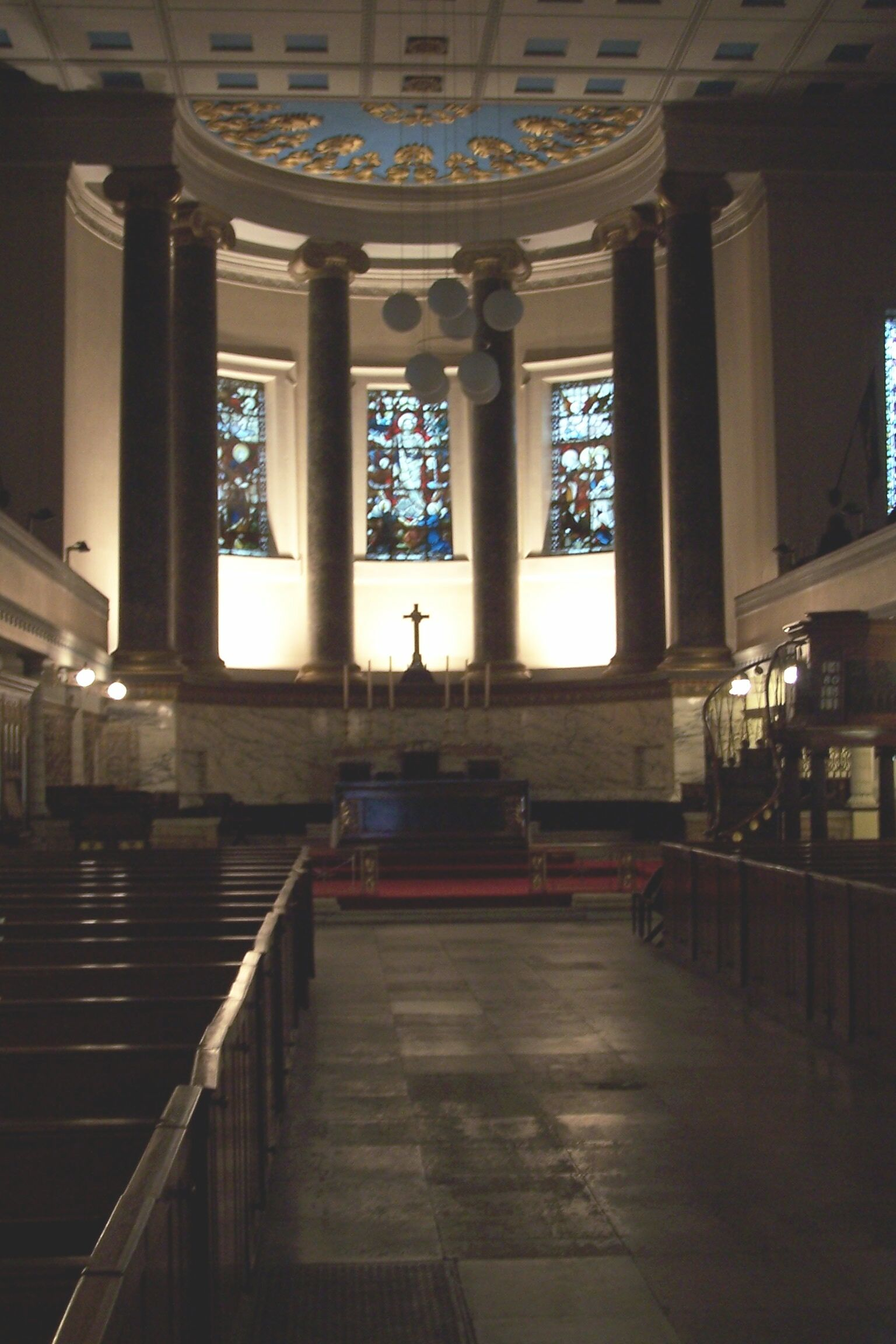
St. Pancras Parish New Church, interior looking east

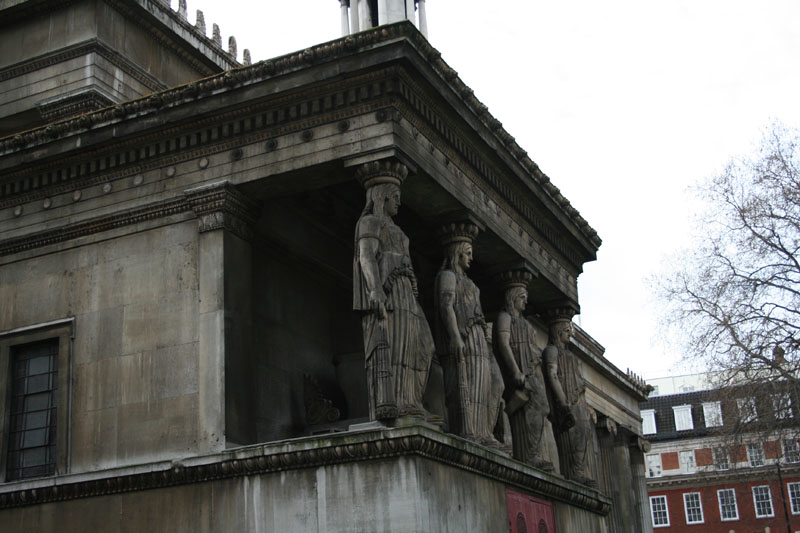
St Pancras, London, from the north-east
