= William Inwood =

English architect and surveyor

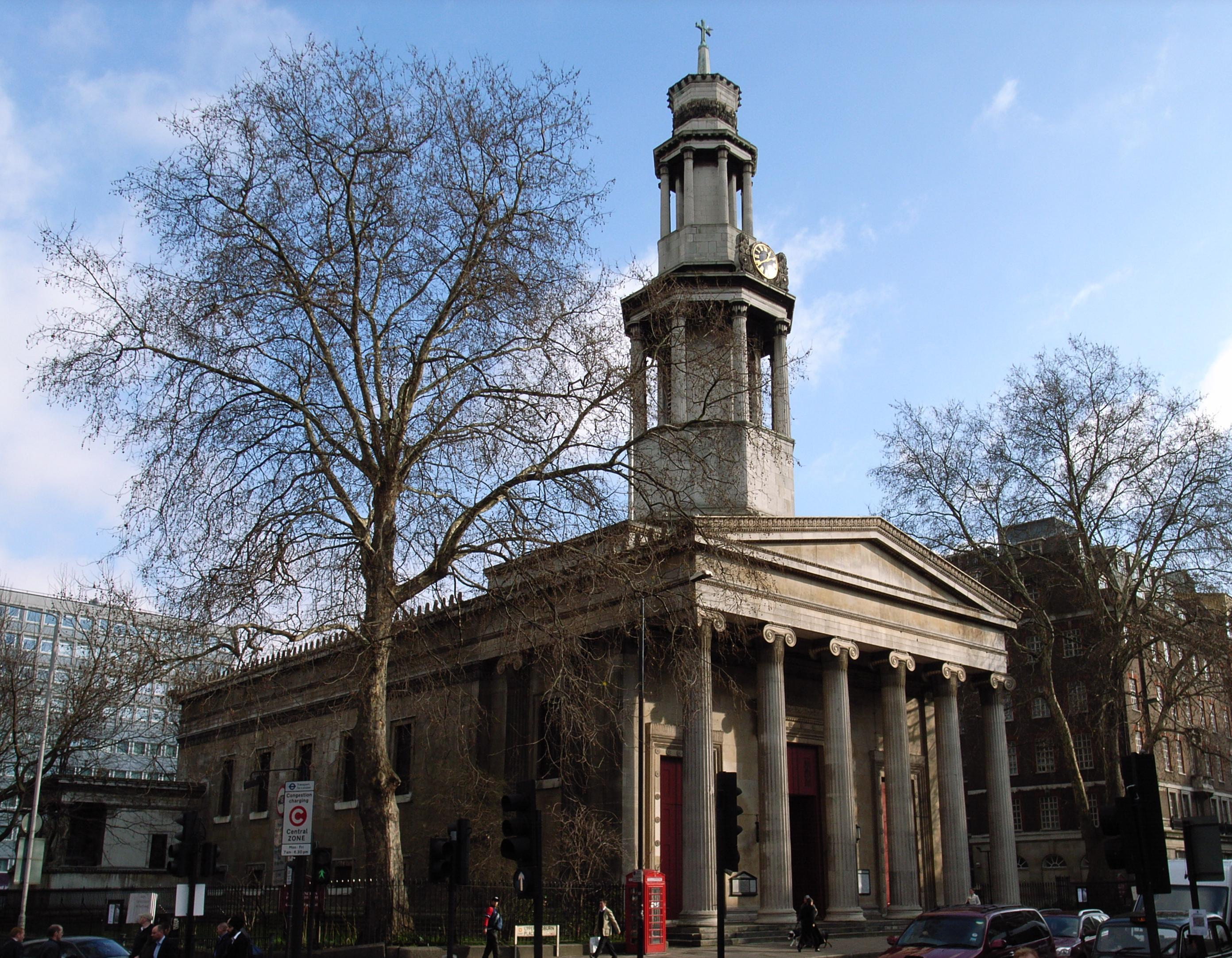
St Pancras New Church

William Inwood (c. 1771 – 16 March 1843) was an English architect and surveyor, whose most important works, including St Pancras New Church and Westminster Hospital, were done in collaboration with his sons.

== Life ==
Inwood was born in about 1771. His father, Daniel Inwood, was bailiff to Lord Mansfield, at Kenwood, Highgate, then just north of London. He was steward to Charles Abbot, (speaker of the House of Commons until 1817, then created Lord Colchester) and clerk of the works to the scheme of improvements around the Palace of Westminster. He was also the architect of the new buildings, completed in 1814, for the Westminster National Free School, of which Abbot was the vice-president. Inwood waived his fee for the commission.

His most notable works are the four churches built in the parish of St Pancras, all designed in collaboration with his eldest son, Henry William Inwood (1794–1843). Three were Neoclassical: St Pancras New Church (1819–22), All Saints, Camden Town (1822–24), and St Peter's, Regent Square (1822–5, demolished). The other, St Mary's Chapel, Somers Town (1824–27) is in a simplistic Gothic style. The commission to design the parish church was won in a competition, held in 1818. It was a prestigious project, often said to have been the most expensive church constructed in London since the rebuilding of St Paul's Cathedral. The design draws heavily on the Erechtheum and the Tower of the Winds, both in Athens, for inspiration. The extent of Inwood's contribution to it has been questioned, John Summerson believing it to be substantially by Henry William Inwood, who visited Athens in 1819 (after the initial plans for the New Church had been drawn up) and later published a book on the Erechtheum.

In 1823 Inwood repaired the roof at St Anne's, Soho, and in 1825 carried out substantial alterations to Thomas Archer's church of St John in Smith Square, Westminster, intended to increase its capacity and improve lighting, in the course of which he rebuilt the galleries, created new doorways and altered the fenestration.

In 1832 Inwood's designs for the new Westminster Hospital in Broad Sanctuary, made in collaboration with another son, Charles Frederick Inwood (1799–1840), were chosen from a number of invited submissions . The specifications had stipulated a Tudor-Gothic style, in sympathy with the nearby Westminster Abbey. The Lancet described the design for the 200-bed hospital as being in the "collegiate style", and praised the practicality of its arrangement, and its provision of light and ventilation.

Inwood exhibited at the Royal Academy between 1813 and 1817, showing two works entitled "Design for a Public Building" one for "a National building", and in 1817, a picture of East Grinstead church. Between 1819 and 1824 he showed, jointly with Henry William Inwood, drawings for St Pancras New Church and the chapels at Regent Square and Camden Town, and in 1838 a design for an Ionic garden temple at Clandon Park, then under construction. In 1832-3 he showed drawings for Westminster Hospital jointly with Charles Inwood. His address is given with various street numbers as Southampton Place or Euston Square.

He was the author of the Tables for the Purchasing of Estates, Freehold, Copyhold, or Leasehold, Annuities, &c, a work based on the tables of Baily and Smart, first published in 1811 and frequently revised and reprinted.

William Railton, the architect of Nelson's Column, was his pupil.

Inwood died on 16 March 1843; his eldest son died only four days later in a shipwreck.
